= International adoption of South Korean children =

Adoptions from South Korea Timeline
| ← / 1988 Summer Olympics in South Korea; ← / 1953 The first 4 South Korean children are adopted to the US; ← / 2011 New citizenship law enabling adoptees to restore citizenship; ← / 1975 President Park announces end by 1985; ← / 1961 First Special Adoption Law is passed; ← / 1970 North Korea starts to criticize South Korea's adoption industry; ← / 1981 International adoption fully liberalised again; ← / 1997 IMF Crisis |
Korean War; Number of adoptions out of South Korea color-coded by amount where the darker color means more
Source: Ministry of Health and Welfare (1968, 2005, 2023)

The international adoption of South Korean children (Korean: 인터내셔널 어돕션 오브 사우스 코리안 칠드런) started around 1953 as a measure to take care of the large number of mixed children that became orphaned during and after the Korean War. It quickly evolved to include orphaned Korean children. Religious organizations in the United States, Australia, and many Western European nations slowly developed the apparatus that sustained international adoption as a socially integrated system.

From the 1970s through the 2000s, thousands of children were adopted overseas every year. Over time, the South Korean government has sought to decrease international adoptions in favor of domestic adoptions. In 2023, seventy years after its start, South Korea still sent 79 children overseas, making it the longest-running international adoption program in the world.

== Korean War and Holt ==
=== Korean War ===
While Amerasians came to constitute fewer than one percent of Korean adoptees by 1988, during the decade after the Korean War, most Korean adoptees were Amerasians who were fathered by American soldiers.

Of 6,293 Koreans were adopted in the United States between 1955 and 1966, of whom about 46% were white and Korean mixed, 41% were fully Korean, and the rest were African-American and Korean mixed. The first wave of adoptees from Korea were usually mixed-race children whose families lived in poverty; the children's parents were often American military men and Korean women.

The ethnic makeup of these children contributed to the will for international adoption. There was a push to remove mixed-race "G.I. babies" from the population. Korean ideas about racial purity and the importance of patrilineal descent led American-fathered children to be viewed as not truly Korean.

=== Holt ===
The start of adoption in South Korea is usually credited to Harry Holt in 1955. Harry Holt wanted to help the children of South Korea, so Holt adopted eight children from South Korea and brought them home. In part due to the response that Holt got after adopting these eight children from the nationwide press coverage, Holt started Holt International Children's Services, which is an adoption agency based in the United States which specialized in finding families for Korean children.

Touched by the fate of the orphans, Western religious groups as well as other associations started the process of placing children in homes in the United States and Europe. The first Korean babies sent to Europe went to Sweden via the Social Welfare Society in the mid-1960s. By the end of that decade, the Holt International Children's Services began sending Korean orphans to Norway, Denmark, Belgium, France, Switzerland, and Germany.

== Media coverage of adoption ==
=== South Korean media coverage ===
In 1988, when South Korea hosted the 1988 Summer Olympics, the international adoption of South Korean children became the focus of global attention, and the issue became a source of national humiliation for South Korea. Politicians claimed that they would try to stop "child exports", so they set an intended end date and a quota for international adoptions. However, the quota has been exceeded several times, and the intended end date has been extended several times.

Not until the 1980s and early 1990s did the South Korean government and South Koreans, both in South Korea and in the diaspora, pay any significant attention to the fates of Korean adoptees. The nation was not prepared for the return of their 'lost children.' But the numerous adult Korean adoptees who visited Korea as tourists every year, in addition to raising public awareness of the Korean adoptee diaspora, forced Korea to face a shameful and largely unknown part of their history. South Korean president Kim Dae-jung invited 29 adult Korean adoptees from 8 countries to a personal meeting in the Blue House in October 1998. During this meeting he publicly apologized for South Korea's inability to raise them.

It's been eight months since I became President. During this period, I've met countless people. But today's meeting with all of you is personally the most meaningful and moving encounter for me. Looking at you, I am proud of such accomplished adults, but I am also overwhelmed with an enormous sense of regret at all the pain that you must have been subjected to. Some 200,000 Korean children have been adopted to the United States, Canada, and many European countries over the years. I am pained to think that we could not raise you ourselves, and had to give you away for foreign adoption. — Kim Dae-jung, Kim Dae-jung's Apology to 29 Korean Adoptees in 1998, Yngvesson (2010)

Since then, South Korean media rather frequently reports on the issues regarding international adoption. Most Korean adoptees have taken on the citizenship of their adoptive country and no longer have Korean passports. Earlier they had to get a visa like any other foreigner if they wanted to visit or live in South Korea. This only added to the feeling that they were "not really South Korean". In May 1999, a group of Korean adoptees living in Korea started a signature-collection in order to achieve legal recognition and acceptance (Schuhmacher, 1999). In 2009, the number of Korean adoptees long-term residents in South Korea (mainly Seoul) is estimated at 500. It is not unlikely that this number will increase in the following decade (International adoption from South Korea peaked in the mid-1980s). A report from Global Overseas Adoptees' Link (G.O.A.'L) indicates that the long term returnees (more than one year) are predominantly in their early twenties or early thirties.

One factor that helped make the subject of Korean adoptees part of the South Korean discourse was a 1991 film called Susanne Brink's Arirang which was a film about the life story of a Korean adoptee who grew up in Sweden. This film made the subject of the international adoptions of Korean children a hot topic in South Korea, and it made South Koreans feel shame and guilt regarding the issue.

A 1997 article in The Christian Science Monitor said that Koreans in South Korea often believed that adoptive families in other countries had ulterior motives for adopting Korean orphans due to the Korean belief that parents can not love a child who is not their biological child.

=== North Korean media coverage ===
In 1988, the Director General of South Korea's Bureau of Family Affairs in the Ministry of Health and Social Affairs said that the large number of international adoptions out of South Korea had been an issue used as part of North Korea's propaganda against South Korea in the 1970s. North Korea, which did not allow for international adoptions, accused South Korea of selling its children. The Director General wanted to decrease the rate of international adoption, so North Korea could no longer exploit the issue..

The 1988 article was serialized by The People's Korea, a pro-North Korea magazine, and the resulting publicity caused South Korea to have the image in the North as the number one child-exporting country of the world: The Pyongyang Times, a North Korean newspaper, printed: "The traitors of South Korea, old hands at treacheries, are selling thousands, tens of thousands of children going ragged and hungry to foreign marauders under the name of 'adopted children'."

=== United States media coverage ===
A 2019 documentary, Geographies of Kinship, was written by a Korean adoptee (Deanna Borshay Liem) and tells the story of international adoption from the perspective of an adoptee.

PBS Frontline created a documentary exposé about South Korean adoption practices on 20 September 2024, soon before the South Korean Truth and Reconciliation Commission (TRCK) published that South Korea owed Korean adoptees an apology on 25 March 2025. PBS Frontline added several articles to confirm the facts in the documentary. The TRCK report also mentioned Brothers Home. Other articles from before the documentary confirm the facts in the documentary and report.

== Korean patrilineal blood culture ==
South Korea has a patrilineal culture that places importance on blood relation. As a result, domestic adoption is rare, because the adoptee would not be seen as a true relative. South Koreans who do adopt domestically typically adopt Korean girls to avoid issues involving ancestral family rites performed by bloodline sons, as well as inheritance.

This patrilineal culture also contributes to stigma and discrimination against unwed Korean mothers and their kids, limiting the mother's career and marital prospects. This social stigma applies not only to the unwed mother and her children, but also to her whole extended family, causing a child who was born out of wedlock to suffer lowered marital, job and educational prospects in South Korea. Additionally, Korean adoptees suffer a social stigma in South Korea, because Korean adoptees have been "cut loose from their bloodlines".

"Koreanness" is seen as passing from parent (particularly father) to child as long as the parents have "pure" Korean blood, hence continuing the bloodline. A Korean family's lineage represents the official recording of their blood purity. Due to this conception of identity along blood lines and race, returning Korean adoptees are seen to still be Korean, even if they cannot speak the language. However, despite the importance of bloodline, a Korean physical appearance is often considered the most important consideration when identifying other people as being Koreans. Other considerations also impact the perceived legitimacy of one's Korean identity; for example, Korean women who had sex with non-Korean men are often not considered to be "Korean" in the "full-fledged" sense.

In a study of Korean adoptees reunited with their birth families, anthropologist Elise Prebin found that the relationships developed between adoptees and their birth families are generally more secure and are easier maintained along the birth father's line than along the birth mother's line. The study found that this demonstrated the continued importance and influence of patrilineal kinship ideologies in South Korea.

== Economics ==
=== Costs saved by South Korea ===
A 1988 article estimated that the South Korean government made fifteen to twenty million dollars per year by the adoption of Korean orphans by families in other countries. The adoption of Korean orphans out of South Korea was reported to have three more indirect economic effects: it saved the South Korean government the costs of caring for the Korean orphans, it relieved the South Korean government of the need to figure out what to do with the orphans, and it lowered the population.

Some academics and researchers claim that the system for orphans Korean adoption agencies have established guarantee a steady supply of healthy children. Supporters of the system claim that adoption agencies are only caring for infants who would otherwise go homeless or be institutionalized.

Some Korean adoption agencies support group homes for pregnant women; three of the four agencies run their own. One of the agencies has its own maternity hospital and does its own delivery. All four provide and subsidize child care. All pay foster mothers a monthly stipend to care for the infants, and the agencies provide all food, clothing and other supplies free of charge. They also support both independent-orphanages, and or self-run ones. The agencies will cover the costs of delivery and the medical care for any woman who gives up her baby for adoption.

A 2011 article in the Institute for Policy Studies estimated each adoption cost US$15k, paid primarily by the adopting parents. This generated an estimated US$35M/yr to cover foster-care, medical care, and other costs for the approximately 2,300 Korean international adoptions.

=== Social welfare of South Korea ===
In a 2010 book, Kim Rasmussen said that the "root cause" of the number of adoptions out of South Korea the country's lack of spending on its social welfare system. Rasmussen said that the other OECD-30 countries spent an average of 20.6% of their GDP on social welfare benefits, while South Korea only spent 6.9% of its GDP on social welfare benefits. Rasmussen said that South Korea promoting domestic adoption would not address the heart of the problem and that South Korea should raise its spending for social welfare benefits.

== Birth mothers and orphans ==
=== Birth mothers ===
In the 1988 article that brought the scale of Korean international adoption to light, a South Korean orphanage director said that according to his orphanage's questionnaire data, 90% of Korean birth mothers indicated that they wanted to keep their child; however, only 10% of birth mothers eventually decided to keep their child after the orphanage recommended that unwed mothers and poor couples should give their child up for adoption. Many of the mothers felt guilty after giving their child up for adoption. Most of the mothers who gave their child up for adoption were poor and worked at factory or clerical jobs in South Korea.

In a same article, an INS officer at the Embassy of the United States, Seoul, said that social workers were hired by adoption agencies to perform the role of "heavies" to convince South Korean mothers to give their children up for adoption. Although the officer said that he felt that the adoption business was probably a good thing for birth mothers, adoptive parents and adoptees, he said that the adoption business troubled him due to the large number of children who were being adopted out of South Korea every month. The INS officer said that these numbers should make people question how much of the international adoption of South Korean children was a humanitarian cause and how much it was a business.

=== Orphans ===
Most South Korean orphans become orphans at a young age, and the majority eventually age out of the orphanages' care when they turn 18 years old, never being adopted. In the past 60 years, only about 15% of the orphans in South Korea were adopted. From the 1950s to 2015, only 4% of those adoptions took place domestically. As of 2015, orphanages in South Korea had become full as a result of the government making it more difficult for orphans to be adopted overseas.

It is extremely difficult for Korean orphans who aged out of institutions at 18 years old to attend a university in South Korea due to the associated costs, so most former Korean orphans ended up getting low-paying jobs in South Korean factories. Many parents in South Korea refuse to allow their children to marry orphans.

=== Baby box ===
In 2009, South Korean pastor Lee Jong-rak put a "baby box" on his church in Seoul to allow people to anonymously abandon children. Since the abandoned children have not been formally relinquished, they cannot be adopted internationally. As a result, most children surrendered there will likely stay in orphanages until they age out at 18 or 19 years old.

Ross Oke, the international coordinator of Truth and Reconciliation for the Adoption Community of Korea (TRACK), said that baby boxes like the one in South Korea encourage abandonment of children and they deny the abandoned child the right to an identity.

=== Korean Adoption Services database ===
In 2014, The Korea Herald reported that Korea Adoption Services (KAS) was digitizing 35,000 documents regarding international adoptions to further the efforts of Korean adoptees hoping to locate their birth parents. In 2016, KAS acquired and scanned 1,073 Korean adoption records from the Seonggajeong orphanage in Deokjeokdo and later the St. Vincent Home in Bupyeong District, in partnership with the Ministry of Health and Welfare. As of 2016, KAS had 39,000 records from 21 institutions.

== Korea's domestic adoptions ==
The South Korean government has attempted to increase domestic adoptions due, in part, to people around the world becoming aware of the scale of international adoption. The South Korean government does not want to have the reputation of a "baby-exporting country." These efforts have also been motivated by the belief that Koreans should be raised with Korean culture. However, this has been less than successful over the decades. The numbers only picked up after 2007.

However, the numbers of domestic adoption fell in 2013 due to tighter restrictions on eligibility for adoptive parents. The number in babies has also gone up with the forced registration of babies, also a new law, leading to more abandonment.

The primary reason as of 2015 for the majority of surrenders within South Korea is single mothers are still publicly shamed within Korea, and the South Korean mothers who give their kids up for adoption have been mostly middle or working-class women since the 1990s. The amount of money single mothers can receive within the country is 70,000 won per month, only after proving poverty versus the tax break from adopting domestically is 150,000 won per month, which is unconditional, whereas it's conditional in the case of single mothers. There are 33 facilities for single and divorced mothers, but the majority of them are run by orphanages and adoption agencies.

In a 2009 article, Stephen C. Morrison, a Korean adoptee, said that he wanted more Koreans to be willing to adopt Korean children. Morrison said that he felt the practice of Koreans adopting Korean children in secret was the greatest obstacle for Korean acceptance of domestic adoption. Morrison also said that in order for domestic Korean adoption to be accepted by Koreans he felt that Korean people's attitudes must change, so that Koreans show respect for Korean adoptees, not speak of Korean adoptees as "exported items" and not refer to Korean adoptees using unpleasant expressions of which Morrison gave the example, "a thing picked up from under a bridge". Morrison said that he felt that the South Korean government should raise the allowable age at which Korean parents could adopt Korean orphans and raise the allowable age at which Korean orphans could be adopted by Korean parents, since both of these changes would allow for more domestic adoptions.

Even in its capacity as a global economy and OECD nation, Korea still sends children abroad for international adoption. The proportion of children leaving Korea for adoption amounted to about 1% of its live births for several years during the 1980s (Kane, 1993); currently, even with a large drop in the Korean birth rate to below 1.2 children per woman and an increasingly wealthy economy, about 0.5% (1 in 200) of Korean children are still sent to other countries every year.

A 2005 opinion piece in The Chosun Ilbo said that South Korean actress Shin Ae-ra and South Korean actor Cha In-pyo publicly adopted a Korean daughter after already having a biological son together, and the article said that by publicly adopting a Korean orphan this the couple could cause other Koreans to change their views about domestic adoptions in South Korea.

=== Quota for overseas adoptions ===
To stem the number of overseas adoptions, the South Korean government introduced a quota system for foreign adoptions in 1987. Under this system, the nation reduced the number of children permitted for overseas adoption by 3 to 5% each year, from about 8,000 in 1987 to 2,057 in 1997. The goal of the plan was to eliminate foreign adoptions by 2015. But in 1998 the government temporarily lifted the restrictions, after the number of abandoned children sharply increased in the wake of growing economic hardships.

Notable is a focused effort of the 2009 South Korean government to seize international adoption out of South Korea, with the establishment of KCare and the domestic Adoption Promotion Law.

=== Incentivizing domestic adoptions ===
A 1997 article in The Christian Science Monitor said that South Korea was giving incentives in the form of housing, medical and educational subsidies to Korean couples who adopted Korean orphans to help encourage domestic adoption, but the Korean couples in South Korea who did adopt tended to not use these subsidies, because they did not want other Koreans knowing that their children were not their biological children.

=== Special Adoption Law ===
Jane Jeong Trenka led an effort among Korean adoptees that resulted in the Special Adoption Law, which was enacted in 2012. The law requires births to be registered and birth mothers to stay with their child for seven days before they may be given up for adoption. The birth mothers' consent then has to be verified before relinquishment of their child. The Special Adoption Law also allows the birth mother to retract her relinquishment for up to six months following her application.

Steve Choi Morrison, a Korean adoptee and founder of Mission to Promote Adoption in Korea (MPAK) fought against the Special Adoption Law due to the importance of saving face in Korean culture. Morrison predicted that forcing Korean birth mothers to register the births would lead to abandonments, as women would fear the record of the birth being discovered, damaging their career and marital prospects.

In 2015, it was confirmed that rates of child abandonment had increased in the years following the passage of the law.

=== Revised Special Adoption Act ===
The Revised Special Adoption Act which was enacted in South Korea in 2012 made domestic adoptions in South Korea recorded as the biological children of the Korean adoptive parents.

A 2014 article in NPR said that the Revised Special Adoption Law did not make adopting Korean children equal to adding a blood relative in the minds of Koreans regardless of how domestic Korean adoptions would now be considered for legal purposes.

== Countries which Korean adoptees were sent to ==
States which most Korean adoptees were sent to
Source: Kim (2010)

Cities with many Korean adoptee residents, Europe
Source: Kim (2010)

Cities with many Korean adoptee residents, United States
Source: Kim (2010)

A 2010 book about Korean adoption said that there are Korean adoptee groups in cities that are in areas with many Korean adoptees residents such as in Stockholm, Copenhagen, Oslo, Paris, Brussels, Amsterdam, New York City, Los Angeles, San Francisco, Minneapolis, Seattle, Portland, Chicago, Boston, and Seoul.

=== Adoptees in the United States ===
An archived web page of the Bureau of Consular Affairs website that said that it was last updated in 2009 said that US couples who wanted to adopt Korean children needed to meet certain requirements. The web page said that the couples needed to be between 25 and 44 years old with an age difference between spouses of no more than 15 years, the couples needed to be married for three years, the couples needed to have an income higher than the US national average, and the couples could not already have more than five children. The web page said that US couples had to pay a fee between $9,500 and $10,000 to adopt a Korean child, and the web page said that it took one to four years after applying for the adopted Korean child to arrive in the United States. The web page said that the wait time after applying for US couples who wanted to adopt was about three years for a healthy Korean child and one year for a Korean child with special needs.

A 1988 article originally published in The Progressive and reprinted in Pound Pup Legacy said that there were 2,000,000 couples who wanted to adopt children in the United States, but only 20,000 healthy children were available for domestic adoption in the United States. The 1988 news article said that the lack of children for domestic adoption caused couples in the United States to look to other countries to adopt children, and the fastest increase of American couples' adoptions from other countries at this time was from South Korea.

A 2010 book about Korean adoption said that Korean adoptees comprise about ten percent of the total Korean American population according to an estimate in a 2010 book about South Korean adoption. The book said that, in the United States, the majority of Korean adoptees were adopted close to adoption agencies, so they were mostly adopted in the states of Minnesota, Wisconsin, Iowa, Nebraska, Michigan, Montana, South Dakota, Oregon, Washington, New York, New Jersey, Massachusetts, Vermont, Utah or Idaho.

=== Adoptees in Sweden ===
A 2002 article in the Embassy of Sweden, Seoul, said that due to the Swedish welfare state of the 1960s more Swedish families started adopting Korean children. The article said that the Swedish welfare system allowed for unwed Swedish mothers to better support themselves and not feel the need to give up their children for adoption. The article said that, as a consequence, there were fewer Swedish orphans in Sweden for domestic adoptions, so Swedish families who wanted to adopt children had to adopt from other countries. The article said that the reason for Korean adoptions, specifically, was that some Swedish families had already adopted Koreans in the 1950s, so later families continued this trend.

== Psychological effects ==
=== Pronunciation of Korean ===
A 2017 article in BBC News said that an article published in Royal Society Open Science said that Dutch-speaking Korean adoptees who were retrained in the Korean language were able to pronounce Korean better than expectations. Korean adoptees who were about 30 years old and who were adopted as babies to Dutch-speaking families were used in the study. The Korean adoptees were compared to a group of adults who had not been exposed to Korean as children. Following a short training course, the Korean adoptees were asked to pronounce Korean consonants for the study. The Korean adoptees did better than expectations after training.

=== Sex work ===
In her Ph.D. thesis, Sarah Y. Park cited Kendall (2005) and Kim (2007) when Park said that female Korean adoptees are commonly told that they may have become a prostitute if they were not adopted out of Korea.

=== Social problems ===
A 2002 study in The Lancet of intercountry adoptees in Sweden of various ethnic backgrounds, most of whom were of Korean, Colombian or Indian (from India) extraction, who were adopted by two parents who were born in Sweden found that intercountry adoptees had the following increased likelihoods relative to the rest of the children who were born in Sweden to two parents who were themselves also born in Sweden: intercountry adoptees were 3.6 times more likely to die from suicide, 3.6 times more likely to attempt suicide, 3.2 times more likely to be admitted for a psychological disorder, 5.2 times more likely to abuse drugs, 2.6 times more likely to abuse alcohol and 1.6 times more likely to commit a crime.

=== Abandonment ===
A 2006 article in New America Media said that an increasing number of South Korean parents were paying elderly American couples to adopt their children for the purpose of having their child receive US education and US citizenship. However, the article said that according to Peter Chang, who led the Korean Family Center in Los Angeles, Korean children who were put up for adoption for the purpose of receiving US education and US citizenship frequently felt betrayed by their biological parents. The article said that getting US citizenship this way required the adopted child to be adopted before their sixteenth birthday and stay with their adoptive family for at least two years.

In a 1999 study of 167 adult Korean adoptees by The Evan B. Donaldson Adoption Institute, the majority of the adult Korean adoptees struggled with the thought of how their birth mother could have given them up for adoption.

=== Korean culture socialization ===
A 2012 study in the Journal of Adolescent Research of Korean adoptees in the United States found that white parents of Korean adoptees whose average age was 17.8 years old tended to try to socialize their adopted Korean children to Korean culture by doing overt actions such as going to Korean restaurants or having them attend Korean culture camp rather than having conversations with them about Korean ethnic identity or being a racial minority in the United States. The study said that for many families doing these overt actions was easier and more comfortable for them than discussing the personal issues of ethnic identity or being a racial minority in the United States.

In a 2005 article, a 38-year-old Korean adoptee who was adopted in the United States said that social workers told her adoptive parents to not raise her with ties to South Korea, because the social workers said that doing that would confuse her. The 2005 article said that adoptive parents were no longer trying to cut ties with the culture of their adopted child's birth country as of 2005, and adoptive parents were instead trying to introduce their adopted kid to the culture of their birth country. In 2005, one popular way for adoptive parents to expose their adopted child to the traditions and food of their birth country was for them to attend "culture camps" which would last for one day.

=== Cross-race effect ===
A 2005 study in American Psychological Society of the cross-race effect used Korean adoptees whose average age was 27.8 years old who were adopted when they were between 3 and 9 years old by French families and the study also used recent Korean immigrants to France. The study had the participants briefly see a photograph of a Caucasian or Japanese face, then the participants had to try to recognize the same Caucasian or Japanese face which they had just seen from a pair of either Caucasian or Japanese faces. The Korean adoptees and French people could recognize the Caucasian faces better than they could recognize the Japanese faces, but the recent Korean immigrants could recognize the Japanese faces better than they could recognize the Caucasian faces, suggesting that the cross-race effect can be modified based on familiarity with certain types of faces due to experiences starting after three years of age.

=== Implicitly raised as white ===
C. N. Le, a lecturer at the sociology department at the University of Massachusetts Amherst, said that Korean adoptees and non-white adoptees in general who are raised by white families are raised to implicitly think that they are white, but since they are not white, there is a disconnect between the way they are socialized at home and the way the rest of society sees them. Le further said that most white families of non-white adoptees are not comfortable talking with their adopted children about the issues that racial minorities face in the United States, and Le further advised white families who adopt transracially that just introducing their kids to Asian culture, telling them that race is not important and/or telling them that people should get equal treatment in society is insufficient. Le said that the social disconnection between how they were raised and the reality of American society causes "confusion, resentment about their situation, and anger" for adoptees who were transracially adopted by white families.

Many of the South Korean children adopted internationally grew up in white, upper or middle-class homes. In the beginning adoptive families were often told by agencies and social workers to assimilate their children and make them as much as possible a part of the new culture, thinking that this would override concerns about ethnic identity and origin. Many Korean adoptees grew up not knowing about other children like themselves. This has changed in recent years with social services now encouraging parents and using home studies to encourage prospective adoptive parents to learn about the cultural influences of the country. With such works as "Beyond Culture Camp" which encourage the teaching of culture, there has been a large shift. Though, these materials may be given, not everyone may take advantage of them. Also, adoption agencies started to allow the adoption of South Koreans by people of color in the late 1990s to early 2000, and not just white people, including Korean-Americans. Such an example of this is the rapper GOWE, who was adopted by a Chinese-American family.

As a result of many internationally adopted Korean adoptees growing up in white areas, many of these adoptees avoided other Asians in childhood and adolescence out of an unfamiliarity and/or discomfort with Asian cultures. These adoptees sometimes express a desire to be white like their families and peers, and strongly identify with white society. As a result, meeting South Koreans and Korean culture might have been a traumatic experience for some. However, other Korean adoptees, often those raised in racially or culturally diverse communities, grew up with ties to the Korean community and identify more strongly with the Korean aspect of their identities.

=== Adoptive parents' role in shaping racial identity ===
Adoptive parents also play a significant role in the development of an adoptee's racial identity. Early studies showed that adoptive parents tend to engage in parenting behaviors that reject the differences or downplay the unique racial and ethnic experiences of children (Andujo, 1988; DeBerry et al., 1996; McRoy & Zurcher, 1983). This process of forced cultural assimilation causes adoptees to more closely identify with their parents' cultural worldview and identify more strongly with the majority culture (McRoy & Zurcher, 1983). Although early studies showed this process of cultural assimilation, more recent studies have shown that parents adopt the belief of enculturation, which is when parents acknowledge the differences within the family and educate their children about their birth culture and heritage (Lee, 2003). Parents with this belief typically provide their children opportunities to be more involved in their birth culture; these opportunities can be social, cultural, or educational, but the purpose is to promote a healthy ethnic identity. Children who grew up with parents who used enculturation were more likely to show racial pride and have a more secure ethnic identity.

=== Adoptees' feelings about South Korea ===
In a 1999 study of 167 adult Korean adoptees by The Evan B. Donaldson Adoption Institute, group discussions about the topic of how they felt about South Korea led to many feelings. There was anger about the negative way Koreans view adopted Koreans. There was concern over Korean orphans in South Korean orphanages, and there was a feeling of obligation to help the Korean orphans who remained in the South Korean orphanages. There was a feeling of responsibility to change Koreans' views of domestic adoption, so that adopting an orphan in South Korea would not be something that Koreans in South Korea would be ashamed of doing.

=== Adoptees' memories of orphanages and initial adoption ===
In a 1999 study of 167 adult Korean adoptees by The Evan B. Donaldson Adoption Institute, there were adoptees who mainly remembered experiencing poverty as orphans such as one adoptee who remembered eating much oatmeal with flies in it as an orphan in South Korea. Some adoptees remembered feeling a sense of loss of the relationships that they had with people when they left their South Korean orphanages. Some of the adoptees remembered being scared of their new living situation with adoptive parents in a new country when they had just been adopted out of South Korea.

== Discrimination ==
=== Discrimination for being adopted ===
A 2014 article in NPR said that Koreans in South Korea were prejudiced against Korean adoptees, and the 2014 news article said that Korean adoptees who were adopted domestically by other Koreans in South Korea often became outcast and bullied by other Koreans at their South Korean school.

=== Discrimination for race and appearance ===
In a 1999 study of 167 adult Korean adoptees by The Evan B. Donaldson Adoption Institute, the majority of respondents (70%) reported their race being the reason they were discriminated against while growing up, and a minority of respondents (28%) reported their adoptee status as being the reason they were discriminated against while growing up. One of the study's respondents said that growing up in a small town of white people made him an oddity that few people wanted to associated with, and he said that he had wanted to be like other people instead of being different. Other respondents said that the discrimination they received growing up caused them to deny their Korean heritage.

In a 2010 book, Kim Rasmussen gave an example of a Korean adoptee from the United States who returned to South Korea and tried to apply for the job of an English teacher in South Korea only to be denied the job due to her race. The Korean adoptee was told that she was rejected for the job, because the mothers of the students wanted their children to be taught English from a white person.

In a 2015 article in The Straits Times, Korean adoptee Simone Huits who was adopted to a Dutch family in the Netherlands made the following remark about growing up in a small Dutch town, "All the children wanted to touch me because I looked different. It was scary and overwhelming."

=== Discrimination for not speaking Korean ===
In a 1999 study of 167 adult Korean adoptees by The Evan B. Donaldson Adoption Institute, the majority of respondents (72%) reported that they had no ability with the Korean language, and only a minority of respondents (25%) reported that they had any ability with the Korean language. Of the study's respondents who visited South Korea, 22% described their visit as a negative experience, and about 20% described their visit as a both negative and positive experience. Inability to speak Korean was mentioned as being a cause of their visit being a negative experience by more than one respondent, and inability to speak Korean was generally the cause of the negative parts of the visit for the respondents who reported both a positive and negative experience. One respondent said that they felt that Koreans in South Korea looked down on them for their inability to speak Korean. Another respondent said that the Koreans in South Korea were initially nice to them, but the respondent said that Koreans in South Korea became rude to them after finding out that they could not speak Korean. Many of the adoptees felt like they were foreigners while visiting South Korea.

A 2007 book about Korean adoption said that it was uncomfortable for Korean adoptees who do not speak Korean and who do not have Korean last names to associate with Korean-speaking children of Korean immigrants in school districts with children of Korean immigrant families.

== Korean adoptee camps ==
Holt International adoptee camp locations
Source: Holt International website

Korean adoptee camp locations
Sources: Camp Moo Gung Hwa website
Korean Adoption Means Pride Website
Sae Jong Camp Website

=== Holt adoptee camps ===
Holt adoptee camps are places where transracial and/or international adoptees can talk about feelings of not fitting in and isolation in a safe space. Each day there are group discussions about issues of identity, adoption and questions regarding race that last about an hour. The locations of the camps are Corbett, Oregon; Williams Bay, Wisconsin; Ashland, Nebraska and Sussex, New Jersey.

=== Camp Moo Gung Hwa ===
Camp Moo Gung Hwa is a Korean culture camp for Korean adoptees in Raleigh, North Carolina. The camp first started in 1995 with the name Camp Hodori, and the camp changed its name to Camp Moo Gung Hwa in 1996. The purpose of the camp is to improve the Korean adoptees' knowledge of Korean culture and improve their self-esteem.

=== Korean Adoption Means Pride ===
Korean Adoption Means Pride (KAMP) is a camp in Dayton, Iowa for Korean adoptees and their families. The camp exposes camp attendees to Korean culture. Korean culture classes cover Korean cuisine, Korean dance, Korean language, taekwondo and Korean arts and crafts.

=== Heritage Camps for Adoptive Families ===
Heritage Camps for Adoptive Families (HCAF) was founded in 1991 and consists of nine different camps for varying adoptee groups, one of which is Korean Heritage Camp. KHC is held annually at Snow Mountain Ranch in Fraser, Colorado. It brings adoptees and their families together each year to learn about adoption and Korean culture.

=== Sae Jong Camp ===
Founded in 1976, Sae Jong Camp is an overnight Korean American summer camp held each year in Roscommon, Michigan for Korean children entering third grade to twelfth grade. Each day, campers participate in Korean language, culture and identity classes, alongside a mix of traditional camp activities, such as archery, canoeing and swimming, and Korean electives, including Korean cooking and Korean crafts. Sae Jong Camp is the nation's oldest continuously running Korean-American summer camp.

== Adoptees returning to South Korea ==
=== Adoptees visiting South Korea ===
In a 1999 study of 167 adult Korean adoptees by The Evan B. Donaldson Adoption Institute, most of the adult Korean adoptees felt that younger Korean adoptees should visit South Korea, 57% of the 167 adult Korean adoptees reported that they have visited South Korea and 38% of the 167 adult Korean adoptees reported visiting South Korea as a means with which they explored their Korean heritage.

Eleana J. Kim, Assistant Professor of Anthropology at the University of Rochester, said that South Korea developed programs for adult Korean adoptees to return to South Korea and learn about what it means to be Korean; these programs included wearing hanboks and learning to make kimchi.

=== Adoptees returning to live in South Korea ===
When International Korean Adoptees turned into adults, many of them chose to return. These countries include Sweden, United States of America, the Netherlands, France, and Belgium. In this respect the so-called re-Koreanization of the Korean adoptees is often reproduced in South Korean popular media (e.g. the blockbuster "Kuk'ka Taep'yo/National Representative/Take Off"). The 're-Koreanization' can be reflected in Korean ethnic based nationalism (both north and south of the 38th parallel).

A 2005 article in Hyphen: Asian America Unabridged said that an increasing number adoptees were moving back to live in South Korea to try to help other Korean adoptees, and it said that many of these returning Korean adoptees were critical of South Korea's adoption system. The article said that one returning Korean adoptee, for example, made a confrontational exhibition where he posted photos of 3,000 Korean adoptees in South Korea's three largest cities with the hope that South Koreans would see these photos and question why South Korea was still sending many Korean children abroad as adoptees. The article said that another returning Korean adoptee created an organization based in South Korea called Adoptee Solidarity Korea (ASK) to end the international adoption of South Korean orphans, and the article said that ASK intended to accomplish this goal by "preventing teenage pregnancy through sex education, monitoring orphanages and foster care, increasing domestic adoption and expanding welfare programs for single mothers." The article said that other Korean adoptees who returned to live in South Korea did volunteer work in orphanages.

The article went on to say Korean adoptees who return to live in South Korea choose to use a Korean name, their adopted name or a combination of both while living in South Korea. The article said that one returning adoptee said that they chose to use a combination of both names to indicate their status as a Korean adoptee. The article said that another returning Korean adoptee chose to use a Korean name, but the name they decided to go by was one that they chose for themselves and not the Korean name which was originally assigned to them by their orphanage when they were an orphan. The article said that another returning Korean adoptee decided to go by their original Korean name over their adopted Belgian name, because their Belgian name was difficult for other people to pronounce.

The article also claimed that Korean adoptees who return to live in South Korea from the United States generally hold higher paying jobs in South Korea that involve speaking English and teaching while Korean adoptees who return to live in South Korea from European countries that use other languages generally get involved with lower paying jobs in restaurants, bars and stores while living in South Korea.

In 2010 the South Korean Government legalized dual citizenship for Korean adoptees, and this law that went into effect in 2011.

in 2023 the group led by Peter Moller, an adoptee demanded inquiry of illegal adoptions between 1960 and 1980s to Truth and Reflection commission

=== Adoptees deported to South Korea ===
A 2016 article in The Guardian said that the South Korean government had record of 10 Korean adoptees who were deported from the United States to South Korea.

A 2016 article in The Nation described the story of a Korean adoptee who did not have U.S. citizenship who was deported to South Korea from the United States for committing a crime in the United States.

A 2017 article in The New York Times, later reprinted in the Seattle Times, about a Korean adoptee who was deported and is looking to make a life in South Korea does an overview of the lives of returning Korean adoptees and the difficulties they face.

== Adoptee associations ==
The first association to be created for adult Korean adoptees was Adopterade Koreaners Förening, founded on November 19, 1986, in Sweden. In 1995, the first Korean adoptee conference was held in Germany, and, in 1999, Korean adoptee conferences were arranged in both the US and South Korea.

A 2010 book about South Korean adoption estimated that ten percent of Korean adoptees who are over the age of eighteen are part of adult Korean adoptee associations.

Korean adoptee associations
| Name | Region | Date founded | Website |
|---|---|---|---|
| International Korean Adoptee Associations | International | 2004 | website |
| Adopted Koreans' Association | Sweden | 1986 | website |
| AKConnection | Minnesota, USA | 2000 | website |
| Also-Known-As, Inc. | New York, USA | 1996 | website |
| Arierang | The Netherlands | 1991 | website |
| Asian Adult Adoptees of Washington | Washington, USA | 1996 | website |
| Korea Klubben | Denmark | 1990 | website |
| Racines Coréennes | France | 1995 | website |
| Association of Korean Adoptees-San Francisco | San Francisco, California | | website |
| Association of Korean Adoptees-Los Angeles | Los Angeles, California | 1994 | website |
| Global Overseas Adoptees' Link | South Korea | 1997 | website |
| Boston Korean Adoptees | Massachusetts, USA | | website |
| Dongari | Switzerland | 1994 | website |
| Korean Canadian Children's Association | Canada | 1991 | website |
| Korean American Adoptee Adoptive Family Network | USA | 1998 | website |

=== Against international adoptions ===
A 2015 article in The Economist said that the Truth and Reconciliation for the Adoption Community of Korea (TRACK) was a lobby group of Korean adoptees that lobbied against the adoption of South Koreans by other countries.

A 2016 book about South Korean adoption said that Adoptee Solidarity Korea (ASK) was an association of Korean adoptees that was committed to ending international adoption.

== Statistics ==
Reasons Koreans do not want to adopt in South Korea
| Reason given | Percent |
|---|---|
| Difficulty raising and loving adopted child like a birth child | 32.1% |
| Families should be based on blood | 29.5% |
| Financial burden | 11.9% |
| Prejudice against adoption | 11.4% |
Source: Korea Institute for Health and Social Affairs

Receiving Australian states and territories of South Korean adoptees from 2001 to 2009
| Receiving state/territory | 2001–2002 | 2002–2003 | 2003–2004 | 2004–2005 | 2005–2006 | 2006–2007 | 2007–2008 | 2008–2009 | Total |
|---|---|---|---|---|---|---|---|---|---|
| Australian Capital Territory | 4 | 5 | 5 | 3 | 3 | 2 | 0 | 1 | 23 |
| New South Wales | 25 | 28 | 27 | 26 | 18 | 16 | 7 | 14 | 161 |
| Northern Territory | 3 | 1 | 2 | 3 | 1 | 0 | 3 | 1 | 14 |
| Queensland | 15 | 16 | 18 | 19 | 15 | 9 | 9 | 7 | 108 |
| South Australia | 20 | 24 | 19 | 12 | 9 | 4 | 4 | 1 | 93 |
| Tasmania | 1 | 4 | 3 | 3 | 2 | 3 | 0 | 1 | 17 |
| Victoria | 12 | 20 | 20 | 23 | 16 | 10 | 12 | 8 | 121 |
| Western Australia | 12 | 10 | 14 | 10 | 5 | 4 | 5 | 2 | 62 |
| Total | 92 | 108 | 108 | 99 | 69 | 48 | 40 | 35 | 599 |
Source: Australian InterCountry Adoption Network

Receiving countries of South Korean adoptees from 1953 to 2008
| Primary countries (1953–2008) | | | Other countries (1960–1995) | | |
| Country | Period | Adoptees | Country | Period | Adoptees |
|---|---|---|---|---|---|
| United States | 1953–2008 | 109,242 | New Zealand | 1964–1984 | 559 |
| France | 1968–2008 | 11,165 | Japan | 1962–1982 | 226 |
| Sweden | 1957–2005 | 9,051 | Okinawa | 1970–1972 | 94 |
| Denmark | 1965–2008 | 9,297 | Ireland | 1968–1975 | 12 |
| Norway | 1955–2008 | 6,295 | Poland | 1970 | 7 |
| Netherlands | 1969–2003 | 4,099 | Spain | 1968 | 5 |
| Belgium | 1969–1995 | 3,697 | China | 1967–1968 | 4 |
| Australia | 1969–2008 | 3,359 | Guam | 1971–1972 | 3 |
| Germany | 1965–1996 | 2,352 | India | 1960–1964 | 3 |
| Canada | 1967–2008 | 2,181 | Paraguay | 1969 | 2 |
| Switzerland | 1968–1997 | 1,111 | Ethiopia | 1961 | 1 |
| Luxembourg | 1984–2008 | 561 | Finland | 1984 | 1 |
| Italy | 1965–2008 | 383 | Hong Kong | 1973 | 1 |
| United Kingdom | 1958–1981 | 72 | Tunisia | 1969 | 1 |
| | | | Turkey | 1969 | 1 |
| | | | Other | 1956–1995 | 113 |
There were 163,898 total adoptees for primary and other countries.
Sources: Hübinette (2005) and South Korean Ministry for Health, Welfare and Family Affairs (2009)

Intercountry adoptions out of South Korea from 1953 to 2008
| Year | Total | Year | Total | Year | Total | Year | Total | Year | Total | Year | Total |
|---|---|---|---|---|---|---|---|---|---|---|---|
| | | 1960 | 638 | 1970 | 1,932 | 1980 | 4,144 | 1990 | 2,962 | 2000 | 2,360 |
| | | 1961 | 660 | 1971 | 2,725 | 1981 | 4,628 | 1991 | 2,197 | 2001 | 2,436 |
| | | 1962 | 254 | 1972 | 3,490 | 1982 | 6,434 | 1992 | 2,045 | 2002 | 2,365 |
| 1953 | 4 | 1963 | 442 | 1973 | 4,688 | 1983 | 7,263 | 1993 | 2,290 | 2003 | 2,287 |
| 1954 | 8 | 1964 | 462 | 1974 | 5,302 | 1984 | 7,924 | 1994 | 2,262 | 2004 | 2,258 |
| 1955 | 59 | 1965 | 451 | 1975 | 5,077 | 1985 | 8,837 | 1995 | 2,180 | 2005 | 2,010 |
| 1956 | 671 | 1966 | 494 | 1976 | 6,597 | 1986 | 8,680 | 1996 | 2,080 | 2006 | 1,899 |
| 1957 | 486 | 1967 | 626 | 1977 | 6,159 | 1987 | 7,947 | 1997 | 2,057 | 2007 | 1,264 |
| 1958 | 930 | 1968 | 949 | 1978 | 5,917 | 1988 | 6,463 | 1998 | 2,443 | 2008 | 1,250 |
| 1959 | 741 | 1969 | 1,190 | 1979 | 4,148 | 1989 | 4,191 | 1999 | 2,409 | | |
| 1953–1959; Total; 2,899 | | 1960–1969; Total; 6,166 | | 1970–1979; Total; 46,035 | | 1980–1989; Total; 66,511 | | 1990–1999; Total; 22,925 | | 2000–2008; Total; 18,129 | |
There was a total of 162,665 overseas adoptions out of South Korea from 1953 to 2008.
Title: Decade / Intercountry adoptions out of South Korea from 1953 to 2008; 2000–2008 / 18,129; 1990–1999 / 22,925; 1980–1989 / 66,511; 1970–1979 / 46,035; 1960–1969 / 6,166; 1953–1959 / 2,899
Sources: Hübinette (2005) and South Korean Ministry for Health, Welfare and Family Affairs (2009)

Intercountry adoptions out of South Korea by country from 2007 to 2011
| Year | Total | US | Sweden | Canada | Norway | Australia | Luxemburg | Denmark | France | Italy |
|---|---|---|---|---|---|---|---|---|---|---|
| 2007 | 1,264 | 1,013 | 80 | 68 | 20 | 44 | 3 | 22 | 14 | - |
| 2008 | 1,250 | 988 | 76 | 78 | 45 | 18 | 16 | 20 | 8 | 1 |
| 2009 | 1,125 | 850 | 84 | 67 | 40 | 34 | 17 | 21 | 8 | 4 |
| 2010 | 1,013 | 775 | 74 | 60 | 43 | 18 | 12 | 21 | 6 | 4 |
| 2011.6 | 607 | 495 | 26 | 27 | 20 | 17 | 9 | 8 | 3 | 2 |
Source: Ministry of Health and Welfare

Disabled South Korean child adoptions
| By year | Total | Before 2000 | 2001 | 2002 | 2003 | 2004 | 2005 | 2006 | 2007 | 2008 | 2009 | 2010 | 2011.6 |
|---|---|---|---|---|---|---|---|---|---|---|---|---|---|
| Total | 39,540 | 33,812 | 757 | 843 | 669 | 712 | 764 | 725 | 540 | 153 | 133 | 252 | 180 |
| Home | 476 | 197 | 14 | 16 | 20 | 7 | 27 | 12 | 40 | 29 | 36 | 47 | 31 |
| Abroad | 39,064 | 33,615 | 743 | 827 | 649 | 705 | 737 | 713 | 500 | 124 | 97 | 205 | 149 |
Source: Ministry of Health and Welfare

Yearly South Korean child adoptions
| Category | | Total | Before 2004 | 2005 | 2006 | 2007 | 2008 | 2009 | 2010 | 2011.6 |
|---|---|---|---|---|---|---|---|---|---|---|
| Total | Total | 239,493 | 221,190 | 3,562 | 3,231 | 2,652 | 2,556 | 2,439 | 2,475 | 1,388 |
| Total | Home | 75,190 | 66,146 | 1,461 | 1,332 | 1,388 | 1,306 | 1,314 | 1,462 | 781 |
| Total | Abroad | 164,303 | 155,044 | 2,101 | 1,899 | 1,264 | 1,250 | 1,125 | 1,013 | 607 |
Source: Ministry of Health and Welfare

Types of adoptees (causes for adoption) in South Korea
| Year | Domestic adoption | | | | International adoption | | | |
| Year | Total | Single mother's child | Child under facility care | Child from broken family etc. | Total | Single mother's child | Starvation etc. | Child from broken family |
|---|---|---|---|---|---|---|---|---|
| 2007 | 1,388 | 1,045 | 118 | 225 | 1,264 | 1,251 | 11 | 2 |
| 2008 | 1,306 | 1,056 | 86 | 164 | 1,250 | 1,114 | 10 | 126 |
| 2009 | 1,314 | 1,116 | 70 | 128 | 1,125 | 1,005 | 8 | 112 |
| 2010 | 1,462 | 1,290 | 46 | 126 | 1,013 | 876 | 4 | 133 |
| 2011.6 | 781 | 733 | 22 | 26 | 607 | 537 | 8 | 62 |
Source: Ministry of Health and Welfare

Adoption circumstances in South Korea from 1958 to 2008
| Year | Abandoned | Broken home | Single mother | Total |
|---|---|---|---|---|
| 1958–1960 | 1,675 | 630 | 227 | 2,532 |
| 1961–1970 | 4,013 | 1,958 | 1,304 | 7,275 |
| 1971–1980 | 17,260 | 13,360 | 17,627 | 48,247 |
| 1981–1990 | 6,769 | 11,399 | 47,153 | 65,321 |
| 1991–2000 | 255 | 1,444 | 20,460 | 22,129 |
| 2001 | 1 | 1 | 2,434 | 2,436 |
| 2002 | 1 | 0 | 2,364 | 2,365 |
| 2003 | 2 | 2 | 2,283 | 2,287 |
| 2004 | 0 | 1 | 2,257 | 2,258 |
| 2005 | 4 | 28 | 2,069 | 2,101 |
| 2006 | 4 | 5 | 1,890 | 1,899 |
| 2007 | 11 | 2 | 1,251 | 1,264 |
| 2008 | 10 | 126 | 1,114 | 1,250 |
| Total | 29,975 | 28,956 | 102,433 | 161,364 |
Source: South Korean Ministry of Health, Welfare and Family Affairs 2009

Foster care status in South Korea
| Year | Total | | Substitute family care | | Foster care by relatives | | General foster care | |
| Year | No. of households | No. of children | No. of households | No. of children | No. of households | No. of children | No. of households | No. of children |
|---|---|---|---|---|---|---|---|---|
| 2006 | 10,253 | 14,465 | 6,152 | 9,062 | 3,097 | 4,160 | 1,004 | 1,243 |
| 2007 | 11,622 | 16,200 | 6,975 | 10,112 | 3,651 | 4,850 | 996 | 1,238 |
| 2008 | 11,914 | 16,454 | 7,488 | 10,709 | 3,436 | 4,519 | 990 | 1,226 |
| 2009 | 12,170 | 16,608 | 7,809 | 10,947 | 3,438 | 4,503 | 923 | 1,158 |
| 2010 | 12,120 | 16,359 | 7,849 | 10,865 | 3,365 | 4,371 | 906 | 1,123 |
Source: Ministry of Health and Welfare

Community home status in South Korea
| Year | No. of facilities | No. of children | | | No. of employees |
| Year | No. of facilities | Total | Male | Female | No. of employees |
|---|---|---|---|---|---|
| 2006 | | 1,030 | | | |
| 2007 | 276 | 1,368 | 745 | 623 | 623 |
| 2008 | 348 | 1,664 | 884 | 780 | 754 |
| 2009 | 397 | 1,993 | 1,076 | 917 | 849 |
| 2010 | 416 | 2,127 | 1,125 | 1,002 | 894 |
Source: Ministry of Health and Welfare

Child welfare facilities in South Korea
| Year | Gender | | |
| Year | Total | Male | Female |
|---|---|---|---|
| 2006 | 18,817 | 10,789 | 8,028 |
| 2007 | 18,426 | 10,563 | 7,863 |
| 2008 | 17,992 | 10,229 | 7,763 |
| 2009 | 17,586 | 10,105 | 7,481 |
| 2010 | 17,119 | 9,790 | 7,329 |
Source: Ministry of Health and Welfare

U.S. adoption of Korean children by year

U.S. adoption of Korean children by age group

US adoptions of Koreans 1999–2015
| Year | Adopted Koreans | Year | Adopted Koreans | Year | Adopted Koreans |
|---|---|---|---|---|---|
| 1999 | 1,994 | 2007 | 938 | 2015 | 318 |
| 2000 | 1,784 | 2008 | 1,064 | | |
| 2001 | 1,862 | 2009 | 1,079 | | |
| 2002 | 1,776 | 2010 | 865 | | |
| 2003 | 1,793 | 2011 | 736 | | |
| 2004 | 1,713 | 2012 | 627 | | |
| 2005 | 1,628 | 2013 | 138 | | |
| 2006 | 1,373 | 2014 | 370 | | |
Source: Bureau of Consular Affairs

Statistics of 167 adult Korean adoptees in 1999
Adoptive parents
| Adoptive Caucasian mother | | 98% |
| Adoptive Caucasian father | | 97% |
Neighborhood growing up
| Neighborhood was only Caucasian | | 70% |
| Neighborhood included other Asians | | 15% |
| Neighborhood included non-Asian non-Caucasians | | 13% |
Friends growing up
| Friends were only Caucasian | | 55% |
| Had Asian friends | | 24% |
| Had non-Asian non-Caucasian friends | | 19% |
Siblings
| Other Korean adopted siblings | | 52% |
| Biological children of adoptive parent | | 26% |
| Respondent was the only child | | 13% |
| Domestically adopted siblings | | 7% |
| Internationally adopted, non-Korean siblings | | 3% |
Race of spouse
| Spouse | Korean men | Korean women |
| Caucasian | 50% | 80% |
| Asian | 50% | 13% |
| African-American | 0% | 3% |
| Latino | 0% | 3% |
View of own ethnicity during childhood and adolescence
| Caucasian | | 36% |
| Korean-American or Korean-European | | 28% |
| American or European | | 22% |
| Asian or Korean | | 14% |
View of own ethnicity as adults
| Korean-American or Korean-European | | 64% |
| Asian or Korean | | 14% |
| Caucasian | | 11% |
| American or European | | 10% |
Korean heritage exploration method
| Activity | Growing up | As adults |
| Korean and/or adoptee events and organizations | 72% | 46% |
| Book/study | 22% | 40% |
| Korean friends or contacts | 12% | 34% |
| Korean food | 12% | 4% |
| Travel to South Korea | 9% | 38% |
| Korean language study | 5% | 19% |
Status of search for birth family
| Interested in searching | | 34% |
| Not Interested in searching | | 29% |
| Have searched or are searching | | 22% |
| Uncertain if interested in searching | | 15% |
Reason for search for birth family
| Obtain medical histories | | 40% |
| Curiosity | | 30% |
| Meet people who look like them | | 18% |
| Learn reason they were given up for adoption | | 18% |
| Learn if they have relatives, especially siblings | | 16% |
| Fill void or find closure | | 16% |
| Send message to birth parents | | 10% |
Source: The Evan B. Donaldson Adoption Institute

Statistics of 179 adult Korean adoptees in 2010
Placement before adoption
| Orphanage | | 40.9% |
| Foster care | | 40.3% |
| Did not know | | 9.1% |
| Birth family | | 8% |
| Other living arrangement than ones listed | | 1.7% |
Reason for separation from biological family
| Did not know | | 46% |
| Did know (39%) | Single-parent household | 21% |
| Did know (39%) | Poverty | 18% |
| Did know (39%) | Lost child accidentally separated from family who were not found | 4% |
| Did know (39%) | Death in the family | 4% |
| Did know (39%) | Placed for adoption by non-parent family member possibly indicating birth parent(s) did not decide to relinquish | 4% |
| Did know (39%) | Abuse in birth family | 1% |
| Did not respond to the question | | 15% |
Source: IKAA Gathering 2010 Report

=== 1999 to 2016 US adoptees ===
From 1999 to 2015, there have been 20,058 Koreans adopted by US families. Of these 20,058 children, 12,038 (about 60%) have been male and 8,019 (about 40%) have been female. Of these 20,058 children, 16,474 were adopted when they were less than one year old, 3,164 were adopted when they were between one and two years old and 310 were adopted when they were between three and four years old. Of these 20,058 children, 19,222 of them immigrated to the United States using the IR-4 Immediate Relative Immigrant Visa, and 836 of them immigrated to the United States using the IR-3 Immediate Relative Immigrant Visa.

== Individual Korean adoptees ==
Works of Korean adoptees have become known both in art, literature and film-making. Other Korean adoptees have received celebrity status for other reasons, like Soon-Yi Previn who is married to Woody Allen, actresses Nicole Bilderback and Jenna Ushkowitz, model and actress Beckitta Fruit, Washington State Senator Paull Shin, former Slovak rap-artist Daniel Hwan Oostra, Kristen Kish of Top Chef Season 10, make-up artist turned content creator Claire Marshall, former French minister Fleur Pellerin and professional baseball player Rob Refsnyder. The 2015 documentary film Twinsters covers the life of Korean adoptees Samantha Futerman and Anaïs Bordier who were separated at birth and reconnected online and meeting in real life.

The stories of various individual Korean adoptees have received coverage in news media.

== Kidnapping and fraud ==
Many Korean children were kidnapped or adopted without the consent of their parents. Several governments engaged in "existence of illicit practices of a systemic nature", including falsifying documents. This was to meet the demand for children in western countries. Adoption agencies charged $9,000 or $12,000 to "order" a child. Many children experienced abuse after being adopted, and are twice as likely to encounter the psychiatric system as other adoptees. The South Korean government stopped adoptions to Sweden, Denmark and Norway but continued after they made sent diplomats to make 9 requests for more children. Adoptions were approved to "promote international friendships" between the ROK and other countries.

=== Truth and Reconciliation Commission investigation ===
An investigation by South Korea's Truth and Reconciliation Commission, published on 26 March 2025, revealed serious violations in the country's foreign adoption program, which facilitated the adoption of over 140,000 South Korean children to countries including Denmark, the United States, and Australia. It said it found human rights violations in the cases of at least 56 adoptees from a petition filed by 367 adoptees sent overseas between 1964 and 1999 to 11 countries including the United States, France, Denmark and Sweden. The commission found that adoption agencies colluded with foreign counterparts to meet quotas, often using unethical or fraudulent methods to procure children. These included falsifying identities, fabricating family histories, and substituting children's identities when adoption processes failed. Many children were adopted without proper oversight, leading to the loss of their true identities and rights. The commission called for a formal apology, remedies for those affected, and South Korea's ratification of The Hague Convention on the Protection of Children and Cooperation in Respect of Intercountry Adoption. Despite these findings, the South Korean government has not officially directly acknowledged responsibility.

On 2 October 2025, President Lee Jae-myung issued an apology for the adoptions.

A new Truth and Reconciliation Commission to investigate the adoptions was reestablished on 26 February 2026.

== In popular culture ==
Korean adoptees to the USA are a common component of South Korean television series. The adoptees depicted are generally born of two Korean parents, speak Korean, and are successful in the United States. Examples of this include You Are My Destiny (character: Daniel Pitt) and Her Private Life (character: Ryan Gold).

Blue Bayou, a film written and directed by Justin Chon, depicts a Korean-American man who was adopted by a white family and is at risk for deportation because his parents did not file for his citizenship. The movie is based on true stories about interracial adoption, which is related to the Child Citizenship Act of 2000.

The 2023 graphic memoir Monstrous: A Transracial Adoption Story by Sarah Myer recounts the authors experiences a Korean-American adoptee.

== See also ==
- Deportation of Korean adoptees from the United States
- Interracial adoption
- Palimpsest: Documents From a Korean Adoption - Comic about a Swedish adoptee of Korean origins who traced her lineage
- Brothers Home
