= Brothers Home =

1970s–1980s South Korean internment camp

Coordinates: 35°9′14.51″N 129°0′35.91″E

Brothers' Home
- Former facility in Busan, South Korea.
- Successor: Siloam's House
- Formation: 1960
- Defunct: 1988
- Purpose: Child protective services, welfare (officially)
- Location: Jurye-dong, Buk District (now Sasang District), Busan
- Leader: Park In-geun
- Key people: Chun Doo-hwan

Korean name
- Hangul: 형제복지원
- Hanja: 兄弟福祉院
- RR: Hyeongje bokjiwon
- MR: Hyŏngje pokchiwŏn

The Brothers' Home (Korean: 형제복지원) was an internment camp (officially a welfare facility) located in Busan, South Korea, during the 1970s and 1980s. The facility contained 20 factories and held thousands of people who were rounded up off the street, homeless people, children, and student protesters who opposed the government. The camp was used to perpetuate numerous human rights abuses in South Korea during the period of social purification.

A 2022 report by the South Korean Truth and Reconciliation Commission concluded that, from 1975 to 1988, a total of 657 people died inside Brothers' Home. The center has since been dubbed "Korea's Auschwitz" by various Korean media outlets.

== Background ==
=== Social cleansing and welfare ===
Throughout the 1950s, the Republic of Korea struggled to recover from the devastation of the Korean War. Welfare policies during this period were focused on the housing of orphans, as they were seen as a stain on South Korea's national reputation. As the 1960s unfolded, Park Chung Hee's military junta commenced efforts to 'cleanse' society of those who were seen as "symbols of the 'poverty' and 'disorder' of cities", and these policies were expanded to cover the detention of general vagrants. (Note: South Korean law during this period defined 'vagrants' (Korean: 부랑인; Hanja: 浮浪人) as "beggars, home owners, gum sellers, or street hustlers who, without a fixed residence, wanders around places where many people gather or pass by, such as tourist spots, hospitality establishments, train stations, bus stops, or residential areas, and harasses passersby by begging or forcefully selling items." In July 2003, the Social Welfare Services Act was reformed to legislate the classification of the "homeless"(Korean: 노숙인; Hanja: 露宿人) as separate from "vagrants". In 2011, the Ministry of Health and Welfare removed the term "vagrant" entirely from South Korean law.) Starting around 1960, major cities such as Seoul, Busan, Daegu, Daejeon, and Gwangju began the construction of 'vagrant detention facilities'. A set of laws enacted in 1961 institutionalized the establishment of vagrant housing facilities. The Social Welfare Services Act of 1970 (구 사회복지사업법) made every vagrant between 18–65 eligible for "social welfare services".

=== Directive No. 410 and Brothers Home ===
In 1975, the South Korean Ministry of Home Affairs announced the Ministry of Home Affairs Directive No. 410 (내무부훈령 제410호), which required municipalities and their local police departments to form "vagrant patrol teams", which would conduct regular patrols at least once a month. Ministry of Home Affairs Directive No. 410 defined vagrants as those who "prevent a healthy social order in cities and society." This ambiguous definition allowed local authorities to autonomously decide who was classified as a vagrant and who was not. Likewise, the city of Busan and its local police arrested and detained numerous people who were seen on the streets, including panhandlers, abandoned or orphaned children, and the disabled as vagrants. In some cases, police took unattended children into custody without their parents' or guardians' knowledge.

The Act on the Execution of Duties by Police Officers of 1953 provided a legal basis for police forces to detain or transfer those who lacked supervision from "an adequate supervisor" and were "in need of aid" to police stations, hospitals, or other welfare facilities. Section 3 of the act required officers to acquire the consent of the subjected individual before aid was to be given. (Note: This requirement stated in Section 3 was removed when the act was amended in 1981.) In the case where police "protection" was to take place, officers were required to "inform family members or other close associates of the aid recipient without delay". However, according to witness accounts, these procedures were rarely followed.

Arrested vagrants were distributed among 36 detention facilities across South Korea. Brothers Home was the biggest among these facilities. First established on July 20, 1960 in Gamman-dong, Busan, Brothers Home began business as an orphanage under the name "Brothers Orphanage" (형제육아소). As the orphanage expanded in size, it transformed into an accommodation center for general vagrants in the early 70s. In July 1975, Brothers Home signed a contract with the city of Busan and became one of its official vagrant detention facilities. Subsequently, Brothers Home relocated to Jurye-dong.

This crackdown on vagrancy was intensified as rebranding efforts were taken place by the South Korean government in preparation for the 1986 Asian Games and the 1988 Seoul Olympics. On April 10, 1981, upon receiving a report from Military Security Command on the status of panhandling among disabled citizens, then-President Chun Doo-Hwan ordered Prime Minister Nam Duck-woo to "crack down on begging and take protective measures for vagrants." In October 6, Chun ordered Nam to "make sure no panhandlers are on the streets of Seoul" before the 1988 Olympics.

== Discovery of human rights abuses ==
=== Investigations ===
In August 1982, a man with the surname Kang submitted a petition asking the government and police to investigate his brother's mistreatment while held at Brothers Home. The case was handled by the Busan Bukbu Police Station, which arranged a meeting between Kang and Park In-geun, who had been the director of the center since 1977. Park took legal action against Kang for false accusation, and Kang was sentenced to eight months in prison on December 23, 1982.

In December 1986, Kim Yong-won, a prosecutor from the District Prosecutors' Office of Ulsan, set out on an investigation after hearing rumors from a local hunter that a group of laborers were logging in a nearby mountain while being assaulted by guards armed with clubs. Kim discovered that the workshop, which was located on a mountain in Ulju County, Ulsan, was operating under orders from Park In-geun, director of Brothers Home. Kim reckoned that Park was subjecting inmates brought from Brothers to forced labor, and launched a full-scale search and seizure investigation into the workshop and the center's main facility in Busan, on January 16, 1987. The investigation, which included interviews of more than 100 inmates, people, and executives of the center, concluded that the center's inmates, most of whom were of sound mind, had been involuntarily transported to and detained by the center, where they were subjected to forced, unpaid labor. A bank receipt indicating a deposit of 2 billion won (approx. $10.6 million in 2025 USD) was also found in a safe in the director's office.

Following the investigation by the Prosecution Service, National Assembly members of the New Korean Democratic Party subsequently conducted an independent investigation into Brothers. The party published its first report on the investigation on February 4, 1987. It concluded that, of the 3,975 inmates who were present at the center in 1986, 3,117 had been brought in by police, and 258 by county officials.

From 2022 to 2024, the South Korean Truth and Reconciliation Commission conducted a series of three investigations into the incident.

=== Beatings and torture ===
Subsequent investigations into the incident revealed that the inmates at Brothers Home were subjected to serious violations of human rights, including arbitrary detention, enforced labor, torture, and sexual violence.

The center was administered with an "army-like chain of command." To reduce administrative costs, one inmate was chosen as the "commander" of the facility, working directly under director Park In-geun. Under the commander, 120 vagrants were grouped into a single residence as one "platoon." Each platoon had a "leader", "general secretary", and "team leaders", all of whom were selected inmates. Inmates were also subjected to collective punishment. In some cases, the entire platoon would be beaten or tortured over the mistake of a single member.

Widespread torture was common. Inmates were often forced to keep painful and exhausting postures for prolonged periods and were beaten when they failed to stay still. In 2020, the Kukmin Ilbo reported accounts from a former inmate who claimed that director Park In-geun physically abused inmates himself and kept handcuffs and oak clubs in the director's office. He further claimed that he had heard rumors that about 40 to 50 inmates in Brothers were killed directly by Park himself.

Children and adolescents of Brothers often became victims of sexual violence by platoon officers. A small number of victims, labeled as 'ttongti' (stemming from "ttong", which translates to excrement) became the primary victims of same-sex sexual violence.

Various testimonies have reported that Brothers Home fed its inmates antipsychotics as a form of "chemical restraint". Purchase records from the center have revealed that Brothers purchased 250,000 tablets of chlorpromazine—along with a series of other antipsychotics such as haloperidol, flurazepam, and carbamazepine—in 1986 alone. In 1987, the city of Busan denied the accusations, explaining that the drugs were over-the-counter drugs that were purchased for medical purposes.

The 1987 New Korean Democratic Party investigation reports estimated that, based on records from the center, a total of 513 people died inside Brothers from July 5, 1975 to January 7, 1987. In 2014, an additional 38 victims were found to have died in the center from 1986 to its decommission in 1988, increasing the number to 551. In 2016, a DW news article reported that a minimum of 516 people died over the course of 20 years at Brothers Home. The 2022 Truth and Reconciliation Commission investigation reported that, based on a comprehensive analysis, including all newly discovered death records from 1975 to 1988, a total of 657 people had died in the center. The bodies of dead inmates were buried in secret, cremated and buried in public cemeteries, or sold to nearby hospitals.

=== Adoption and human trafficking ===
From the mid-to-late 20th century, about 200,000 South Korean children, mostly girls, were sent abroad for adoption. It is now believed that they constitute the largest diasporic adoptee population in the world. An investigation by the Associated Press discovered direct evidence that Brothers Home organized the adoption of 19 children from 1979 to 1986. The AP further revealed that six U.S. adoption agencies—Holt International, Children's Home Society of Minnesota, Dillon International, Children's Home Society of California, Catholic Social Services, and Spence-Chapin—had received adoptees from Brothers.

The European countries included Belgium, Germany, Netherlands, Norway, and Denmark. Most of the Korean girls were not real orphans and had living biological parents, but their status was intentionally faked to show that they were orphans and put on adoption in foreign countries for money. The Korea Welfare Services, Eastern Social Welfare Society, Korea Social Service and Holt Children's Services were the adoption agencies involved in the trafficking of the girls. The Truth and Reconciliation Commission began investigating the scandal in 2022. The military leaders were linked to the agencies' board members, and they wanted to establish closer links with the West and decrease South Korea's population. South Korea's Korean Broadcasting System reported on the case of the Korean girl Kim Yooree who was taken away from her biological Korean parents and adopted to a French couple where she was raped and molested by her French adopted father. Across Australia, Europe and the United States, the majority-female Korean adoptees asked for an investigation from the Truth and Reconciliation Commission into the child trafficking scandal. Holt Children's Service was sued by a Korean adoptee in the US for compensation.

== Aftermath ==
=== Trial of Park In-geun ===
Park In-geun was prosecuted on several charges including embezzlement and illegal confinement. On June 23, 1987, the Ulsan District Court initially ruled Park guilty on all charges and sentenced him to ten years in imprisonment and a 681 million won fine. On November 27, 1987, however, the Daegu High Court dropped Park's charges of daytime imprisonment after an appeal was made, and the sentence was lowered to four years. On March 8, 1988, a second appeal at the Supreme Court of Korea ruled Park not guilty on all charges of illegal confinement. While a remanded case by the Daegu High Court once again ruled Park guilty of unlawful night-time imprisonment, the Supreme Court retained its ruling on a third appeal. A final ruling by the Daegu High Court during the case's second remand ultimately ruled Park not guilty of all imprisonment charges, including both daytime and night-time imprisonment, on March 15, 1989, and declared a final sentence of two-and-a-half years in prison on embezzlement charges. One final appeal was made to the case by the prosecution, but it was dismissed by the Supreme Court on July 11.

The prosecution, which originally sought a fifteen-year sentence and a fine amassing around 600 million won, was put under pressure by the Chun Doo-hwan administration. While the incident initially sparked public outrage, public interest faded away from the case due to cover-up efforts by the military regime and the subsequent death of student activist Park Jong-chul.

While Park In-geun was arrested in January 1987, the facility remained in operation until early 1988 and the company changed its name to Siloam's House in 1989.

Park In-geun was charged again in 2014 for embezzlement, along with his eldest son, Park Chun-Kwang, but his charges were suspended since he was suffering from dementia. Park died two years later in 2016.

=== Legal and legislative actions ===
In 2014, Jin Sun-mee and 53 sponsors introduced a special bill to investigate Brothers Home and compensate the victims to the 19th National Assembly, though it died in committee. A revised bill was introduced in the next National Assembly by Jin and 72 sponsors in 2016, but also died in committee. The revised bill expanded the scope from the original bill to other social welfare centers.

Many survivors have sued the government since May 2021. In January 2024, the court awarded the 13 survivors the total of 4.535 billion won of the 8 billion won requested. Each received 75 million to 420 million won. The state and the survivors both appealed, but the ruling was upheld by appeals court and in March 2025 the Supreme court, cementing the result.

On December 10, 2020, public outcry led to the launch of the second Truth and Reconciliation Commission, which addressed human rights violations at facilities such as Brothers Home. On 23 August 2022, the Truth and Reconciliation Commission of the Republic of Korea officially recognized the state's culpability in the human rights violations between 1975 and 1987 at Brothers Home. The abuses included confinement, isolation, forced unpaid labor, and various forms of violence. The Truth and Reconciliation Commission confirmed in February 2025 that at least 31 children were improperly sent overseas for adoption, with nearly 5,000 pending cases. The investigation was set to conclude in May 2025 unless the National Assembly extended its mandate.

=== Survivor protests ===
In 2012, Hahn Jong-seon began a year-long protest in front of South Korea's National Assembly by himself. He held up signs detailing the abuse he endured, along with a photo of him at the age of nine. With the support of human rights groups, more protests began across the country. Hahn Jong-seon, along with another survivor and a human rights activist, wrote a book titled Saranameun ai: urineun eotteoke gongmojaga doeeonna (The Child Who Survived: How We All Become an Accomplice) that attracted public attention.

In April 2015 survivors shaved their heads as a demonstration, and in December, Hahn Jong-seon began a hunger strike. September 2017 survivors walked 500 kilometers from the Brothers Home site in Busan to the Blue House in Seoul, which took 2 months. November 2017 survivors began a sit-in in front of the National Assembly building.

Among the most vocal and active participants in the survivor protest movement is Park Soon-hee, one of the most outspoken survivors of Brothers' Home and a key figure in the movement demanding justice for its victims. Detained at the age of ten, Park endured forced labor, physical abuse, and prolonged isolation. Her public testimony has helped to break the silence surrounding Brothers' Home and bring attention to the widespread human rights abuses that took place there under the guise of social welfare. She has participated in protest, media interviews, and truth hearings calling for full government accountability and a formal apology.

To extend beyond domestic democracy, Park has raised concerns about former staff now living abroad, demanding further investigation and possible extradition. She has been particularly vocal about the complicity of religious leaders who supported the facility, emphasizing the need for institutional accountability alongside individual prosecution.

=== Popular culture ===
Rumors that the center has served as the inspiration behind the South Korean television series Squid Game have circulated online; however, the series' creators have not confirmed this.

== Involvement of the Protestant Church ==
Survivors of Brothers Home have alleged close cooperation between the camp and the Protestant Church. One former inmate reported being forced to perform in Christian plays for local and international guests and given Easter eggs as rewards. Another was sent to the camp by a Christian missionary. Another survivor described the church and the camp as a business operation run by Pastor Lim Young-soon and Director Park In-geun, with children forced to work and run an on-premises Korean adoption operation, including writing letters soliciting donations from families who have adopted children in the past. Some of the adoption partners abroad were also part of Christian organizations.

According to Shin Yi-geon (신이건), a representative of The Korea Christian Newspaper, Park In-geun was a senior presbyter of a church belonging to The General Assembly of Presbyterian Church in Korea. Shin further claimed that, despite being aware of the human rights violations at Brothers, Christian organizations in Busan such as the Busan National Council of Churches and the Busan YMCA neglected to reveal them.

== See also ==
- South Korean social purification project
- Chun Doo-hwan
- Yodok concentration camp
