= 77s =

77s or 77S may refer to:

- The 77s, American rock band
- Hobby Field in Creswell, Oregon, FAA identifier
