= Deportation of Korean adoptees from the United States =

Post-Korean War citizenship issue

There have been several high-profile cases of deportation of Korean adoptees from the United States. Prior to the passage of the Child Citizenship Act of 2000, the adoptive parents of adoptees had to file for their child to naturalize before the age of 16. Many parents were unaware of this requirement, assuming that their adopted children automatically derived citizenship from them, and therefore did not apply. The Child Citizenship Act sought to remedy this issue by extending citizenship to all international adoptees who were under 18 at the time that the bill was passed, but did not apply retroactively. This left those adopted by American families prior to 1983 vulnerable to deportations.

From the 1950s through 1991, a plurality of international adoptees came from South Korea. Koreans are the largest group of adoptees in the U.S. It has been estimated that as many as 20% of adult Korean adoptees are at risk of deportation. Many of the vulnerable adoptees suffered from a lack of access to other resources American citizens have.

If deported, they also face major challenges adjusting to live in South Korea. If they have no known family or relations in their birth country and do not speak the language, as is often the case, it is incredibly difficult for them to meet their basic needs such as housing and employment. These factors contributed to the 2017 suicide of Philip Clay, a Korean adoptee who was deported.

The exact number of deported Korean adoptees is unknown and difficult to ascertain, but there are at least half a dozen known cases.

== Adoption laws in the United States ==
Traditionally, adoptions in the United States were finalized in the state of residence of the adoptive parents, but that system failed to recognize adoptions made abroad and not finalized in U.S. territory. Although states still hold exclusive authority over family law within their territory, the federal government, birth countries, and international law now play a role in the process of international adoption.

The Child Citizenship Act of 2000 also improved the legalization process for international adoptees. This act allowed adoptees who were under the age of 18 years at the time of the Act to get automatic United States citizenship, but those born prior to 1983 were left vulnerable to immigration laws since they were adults by the time of the Act.

The Adoptee Rights Campaign estimates that "112,000 Korean children were adopted by US citizens in the last 60 years. Out of these, 20% of adoptees who are now adults are living in the U.S. without citizenship, in danger of deportation.

Though previous adoption laws allowed many international adoptees to gain citizenship, there are still many who could not benefit because of the age restrictions, such as was the case for adoptees who were adults by the time the Child Citizenship Act of 2000 was put into action. However, there is now a petition for The Adoptee Citizenship Act of 2019 to help those adults who were left vulnerable to deportations. According to the Adoptees for Justice website, "The Adoptee Citizenship Act of 2019 will grant automatic citizenship to all qualifying international adoptees adopted by a U.S. citizen parent, regardless of the date the adoption was finalized or the entering visa." In addition, there are various city resolutions under consideration to be sent to Congress. One such resolution is the Ryu Resolution for Adoptee Citizenship introduced to the Los Angeles City Council. This resolution "would automatically grant citizenship to those adopted by U.S. citizens as children."

== Example deportations ==
=== Philip Clay ===
Phillip Clay (Kim Sang-pil) was found abandoned in Seoul in 1981 and legally adopted into an American family in Philadelphia.

After a struggle with drug addiction and a run in with the law, Clay was deported back to Korea in 2012, despite no knowledge of the Korean language or customs, nor without a single contact in the country. Diagnosed in Korea with bipolar disorder, he was shuffled in and out of social agencies and hospitals who could not care for him due to a lack of English speaking staff. In 2017, Clay ended his life jumping from the 14th floor of a building in Seoul.

=== Adam Crapser ===
Adam Crapser was adopted from South Korea by United States citizens in 1979, then readopted by a second family years later. Both families were charged with child abuse, and Crapser was later left alone without United States citizenship. Crapser had run-ins with law, including 3 domestic violence incidents and a charge of contributing to the sexual delinquency of a minor, that led to him not being eligible for a green card after years of searching for his proper adoption documentation.

Crapser filed a lawsuit against one of the biggest international adoption agencies, Holt Children's Services, for negligence in sending thousands of children to the United States and other countries without "accounting for their future citizenship." In May 2023, the court found in Crapser's favor and ordered Holt to pay nearly $75,000 in damages. Crapser now lives in Mexico. The law suit was later over turned.

=== Hyebin Schreiber ===
Adopted by her uncle and aunt in Kansas, Hyebin Schreiber arrived in the United States in 2014 at 15 years of age from relatives who could not afford to care for her. Her uncle, retired Army Lt. Col. Patrick Schreiber spent much of 2013 and 2014 deployed to Afghanistan, and was unaware that he would need to formally apply for naturalization prior to her 16th birthday to qualify. After a protracted court battle, the United States 10th Circuit Court of Appeals ruled in 2019 that she must return to Korea.

== In popular culture ==
Blue Bayou, a film written and directed by Justin Chon, depicts a Korean-American man who was adopted by a white family and is at risk for deportation because his parents did not file for his citizenship. The movie is based on true stories about interracial adoption, which is related to the Child Citizenship Act of 2000.

== See also ==
- International adoption of South Korean children
