= Adoption in South Korea =

Adoption in South Korea, specifically the low rates of domestic adoption in their history, has been a point of discussion for the country, causing new policies to be passed over the years. South Korea, at the conclusion of the Korean War in 1953, began to partake in transnational adoption. As these overseas adoptions increased over the next couple of decades, South Korea pushed to encourage fewer transnational adoptions and more domestic adoptions. The high number of children put up for adoption each year in South Korea can be attributed to a variety of factors: the lack of support for unwed mothers, as well as social stigma, contributed greatly to these numbers. Several organizations have been created to support unwed mothers and combat stigma. There has been changes to adoption policies throughout the decades as well. The Special Adoption Act was passed in 2011 with the intention of boosting domestic adoptions. However, the unexpected outcome of more abandoned children ensued following the amendment taking effect.

== History of adoption practices ==
There was an increased number of displaced children following the Korean War (1950-1953). In 1954, Korean adoptions formally began following the creation of the Children Placement Services. The government created The Five Year Plan for Adoption and Foster Care in 1976 which was directed at increasing domestic adoption. This plan was not as effective as intended because, just nine years later, the country reached its peak of international adoption rates. After South Korea reached this peak in 1985, having sent 8,837 children abroad, the country received criticism for such high numbers of international adoption. In 1989, South Korea implemented a new policy to eventually, put an end to international adoption, and in turn, keep adoptions domestic. For the time being, it was stated that the goal would be that only mixed-race and disabled children would be exported for international adoptions. 2007 brought a new policy in an attempt to increase domestic adoption. This policy was established to prioritize domestic adoptions by only allowing children to be adopted domestically for a period of five months after the child was put up for adoption.

== Special Adoption Act and its aftermath ==
In 2011, adoption law in South Korea was amended, known as the Special Adoption Act. In August of 2012, the Special Adoption Act went into effect. The Special Adoption Act was passed in the hopes of increasing domestic adoption and decreasing international adoption. This new amendment changed some of the regulations regarding the adoption process. To start, there were three new stipulations related to the birthparents included in this amendment. First, it required a waiting period of seven days post childbirth before the birthparents could consent to adoption. Second, it became mandatory for birthparents to be informed, in the event they kept the child, of available resources. This was meant to urge the birthparents to reconsider and to discourage adoption altogether. The last requirement of the birthparents put in place by this act is the obligation to go to family court for adoption. The obligatory approval of the family court meant that adoptions, and the birthparents that put their children up for adoption, would become documented in public records.

Aside from the effect of the Special Adoption Act on birthparents, there became new rules and regulations regarding adoptive parents. Adoptive parents were to, following the implementation of the act, be screened for any history of any criminal activity such as child abuse, drug abuse, domestic violence, and other related activities that would indicate an unsafe home for children. If anything of this nature surfaces at any point during the adoption process, the adoption can be cancelled.

For the adopted children, there became more resources available to them. Through the Special Adoption Act, the Central Adoption Agency was formed. The Central Adoption Agency was a way to keep track of birthparents' data for adopted children to access later in their lives if the birthparents consented to the disclosure of personal information about themselves. Adopted children may access information related to their adoption even if they do not have access to the information about their birthparents. In special circumstances, such as for medical purposes, the consent of the birthparents is not required for the adopted child to receive the necessary information.

=== State of domestic adoption and abandonment following the Special Adoption Act ===
While the Special Adoption Act was passed with the intention of increasing domestic adoption and decreasing other events such as international adoption and child abandonment, it did not reap the results expected. Following the amendment, the ratio of domestic adoptions to international adoptions increased, but there were fewer adoptions overall. This was a result of more children being abandoned instead of being put up for adoptions by parent(s). In 2010, before the Special Adoption Act was passed, there were 191 children abandoned in South Korea. The year the amendment went into effect, 2012, the number of children abandoned increased to 235.

== Unwed mothers and childcare ==
Unwed parents have contributed greatly to the large number of children put up for adoption each year. From adoption statistics in 2012, unwed mothers birthed about 92.8 percent of the children adopted. The high number of adopted children with unwed birthmothers can be explained through a variety of reasons. To start, the stigma in South Korea discourages unwed mothers to raise their children. This was part of the issue with the Special Adoption Act because, since adoptions were required to be on government records, some mothers did not want to have adoption be part of their written history. In addition, government support for single mothers was not provided until 2003. Even after government support began, the funds allotted were only 50,000 won, or $44, per month. In 2009, this monthly allowance increased to 100,000 won, or $89, per month. To continue, the lack of sufficient childcare has contributed to this cycle of unwed mothers giving up their children for adoption. Without sufficient childcare, it hinders the mother's chance to access full-time employment, therefore placing a barrier between the mother and adequate welfare opportunities that are only offered to full-time, formal employees. Following the concern in 1990 of there only being enough childcare centers to provide for less than 9 percent of children in need of it, some reform took place. Between 1995 and 1997, South Korea invested money into building new facilities, but the increased need for these facilities caused this effort to be insufficient. At the start of 2012, the government stated that they would begin to offer childcare to all that need it, specifically children under two years old, no matter the income of the parents. By the end of the year, however, this program was not able to stay in place because of the high costs to keep it intact.

=== Organizations to support unwed mothers ===
Organizations have emerged to provide support for the rights of unwed mothers in South Korea. Listed below are a few of the main ones.

- Korean Unwed Mother Family Association (KUMFA)
- Korean Unwed Mothers Support Network
- Truth and Reconciliation for the Adoption Community of Korea (TRACK)
- Adoptee Solidarity Korea

== See also ==
- International adoption of South Korean children
