= Death of Sherin Mathews =

2017 homicide of a young child in Texas

Sherin Susan Mathews
- Born: July 14, 2014; Bihar, India
- Died: October 7, 2017 (aged 3); Richardson, Texas, U.S.
- Cause of death: Suspected homicide
- Body discovered: October 22, 2017
- Resting place: Turrentine Jackson Allen, Tx
- Citizenship: American
- Parent(s): Sini Mathews (adoptive mother); Wesley Mathews (adoptive father)

Sherin Susan Mathews (born Saraswati Kumari) (July 14, 2014 – October 7, 2017) was an Indian American toddler who was found dead in a culvert in Richardson, Texas. She was reported missing by her adoptive father Wesley Mathews on October 7, 2017. Her body was found October 22, 2017, under a road in a culvert near her home. Mathews admitted to the disposing of her body on the same day the body was found.

== Early life ==
Sherin Mathews was born in Gaya, Bihar. Soon after her birth, she was abandoned by her unknown biological parents, who left her in a bush at the city train station. She was found by a charity worker and taken to Nalanda Mother Teresa Anaath Seva Ashram, an adoption center in Nalanda run by Babita Kumari. Kumari gave the baby the first name "Saraswati", after the Hindu goddess Saraswati, as well as her own surname. Kumari recalled that Saraswati used to call her ''Mumma.'' She described Saraswati as a happy and healthy child.

Wesley Mathews and his wife Sini Mathews, residents of Richardson, Texas and originally from Kerala adopted Saraswati Kumari on July 18, 2016. They renamed her "Sherin" along with their own surname "Mathews". Babita Kumari stated that at the time of the adoption, the couple spoke no Hindi, which was the only language Sherin spoke. However, believing the child would have a better life in the United States, Kumari agreed to the adoption.

Sherin lived with her adopted parents in Richardson, Texas until she was reported missing in October 2017. Sherin's death has led to the Indian government suspending Holt International, the adoption agency that placed Sherin with the Mathews, revising its adoption process to prevent similar incidents in the future.

== Disappearance ==
The Richardson Police were notified about Sherin's disappearance on October 7, 2017, at around 8 a.m. Wesley Mathews told police that Sherin was very undernourished when adopted from India (a claim which Babita Kumari later denied) and that in order for her to gain weight, she should eat and drink whenever she was awake. Wesley Mathews's initial report indicated that one of these feedings was attempted that morning at 3 a.m. However, Sherin did not want to drink her milk, and as punishment, he made her stand outside in a nearby alley. When Mathews went back outside to check on Sherin 15 minutes later, she was missing. Rather than reporting the disappearance immediately, Mathews said he did a load of laundry while figuring out what to do.

== Investigation ==
Questions were raised as to why Sherin's parents had waited five hours to report her disappearance. On October 7, Wesley Mathews was arrested for child endangerment, for which he was later released on bail. Investigators began to further doubt his version of events after discovering that the family SUV had departed the Mathews household at approximately 4 a.m. the morning Sherin went missing. The SUV returned to the home before 5 a.m. on October 7, about three hours before Sherin's disappearance was reported to law enforcement.

== Discovery of body ==
On October 22, 2017, the body of a small girl, later positively identified as Sherin Mathews, was found in a culvert near the Mathews' home. The same day, Wesley Mathews reported to the police station and changed his statement. According to the new testimony, when Sherin refused to drink the milk, he "physically assisted" her in drinking it; Sherin began to choke and subsequently died. He then disposed of Sherin's body in the culvert.

According to Sherin's pediatrician, Dr. Suzanne Dakil, Sherin had injuries in various stages of healing and multiple broken bones. In response to this finding, which she identified as signs of abuse, Dr. Dakil alerted Child Protective Services. Sherin had also been hospitalized multiple times for skin and joint infections. One of Sini Mathews's explanations for the broken bones was that Sherin's older sister pushed her off a couch; upon another hospitalization, Sini Mathews stated that Sherin fell off some playground equipment. Sini Mathews told Dr. Dakil that Sherin had brittle bones as a result of the poor diet she had in India. However, the doctor determined that the injuries had occurred after Sherin left India. Babita Kumari later stated that Sherin had never been malnourished or shown any other health problems while she lived at the orphanage.

On January 3, 2018, Sherin's cause of death was reported as "homicidal violence" by the Dallas County Medical Examiner's office.

== Arrests ==
Wesley Mathews was initially arrested for child endangerment and was released on bail. After the child's body was discovered and Wesley changed his statement, he was re-arrested on a charge of felony injury to a child. Wesley remained in jail on a bond of $1 million. On August 1, 2018, his bail was dropped to $500,000. On November 16, 2017, Sini Mathews turned herself in to the police, and was jailed on a bond of $250,000. She was charged with child abandonment after police alleged she left Sherin home alone on the night of October 6. Wesley Mathews was sentenced to life in prison. Charges were later dropped against Sini on March 1, 2019; this action was criticized by the Richardson Police Department. Wesley Mathews motioned for a new trial following his sentencing, claiming the photographs of the child's dead body, or the photos showing her injuries before her death, should never have been shown. On September 5, 2019, he was denied a new trial.

== See also ==
- List of solved missing person cases (2010s)
- List of unsolved deaths
