= Arierang =

Dutch Korean adoptee organization

Arierang is the Dutch association for Korean Adoptees in the Netherlands.

International adoption of South Korean children to the Netherlands started in 1969, after lobbying started in late 1967. Since then until 2003, around 4100 children have been adopted from South Korea to Dutch parents in the Netherlands.

Arierang was founded in 1991 by Dutch Korean Adoptee Myong Sook Flikweert. Its bylaws were filed on May 28, 1993, officially becoming a registered association. Arierang is a founding member and part of the International Korean Adoptee Associations (IKAA).

Members of Arierang are adopted from the Republic of Korea, living in the Netherlands and older than 16 years. Activities are frequently organised for and by the members on a volunteer basis such as the Arierang Weekend and social events on a monthly basis. The association publishes a member magazine, Uri Shinmun (='Our Newspaper'). Furthermore, Arierang hosts events and shares information about Korean culture, language, food, travelling and adoption. Arierang strives to maintain good relationships with the Korean society in the Netherlands and the embassy of the Republic of Korea.

In 2009 Arierang hosted the IKAA Gathering in Amsterdam, with over 140 Korean adoptees from 9 countries attending.
