= Emerald Valley Golf Club =

Public golf course in Creswell, Oregon, US

- Interactive map of Emerald Valley Golf Club
- 43.92255°N 122.99445°W

Club information
- Location: Creswell, Oregon, U.S.
- Owner: Jim and Hal Pliska
- Tota holes: 18
- Website: www.emeraldvalleygolf.com
- Designed by: Bob Baldock (1966) and Dan Hixon (2002)
- Par: 72
- Length: 7,143 yards (6,532 m)
- Course rating: 74.0

Emerald Valley Golf Club is a public golf course located in Creswell, Oregon, in the Pacific Northwest region of the United States. The Emerald Valley course was the first regulation-length public golf course in the Eugene metropolitan area. The course runs along the west bank of the Coast Fork of the Willamette River.

== History ==
The Emerald Valley Golf Club was begun in 1966 by Eugene Russell, James Russell, and Marv Ruby. It was built on the site of a 160-acre (0.65 km^{2}) dairy farm northeast of Creswell. Before the course opened, Ruby purchased the Orenco Woods Golf Course in Hillsboro, Oregon from the Russell brothers and left the partnership. In 1967, the first nine holes were opened alongside the clubhouse, which was remodeled from the site's original dairy barn. The second nine holes were opened in 1968, making Emerald Valley the first regulation-length public golf course in the Eugene-Springfield metropolitan area.

In 1974, the Russell brothers sold the golf course to Peter Murphy, owner of the Murphy logging company. Over the next four years, Murphy made improvements such as a new drainage system. In 1978, Murphy sold the golf course to the Mazama Timber Products Company, which was owned by the Forrest Solomon family. Mazama planned to build a modern clubhouse and health spa, as well as homes and condominiums adjacent to the golf course.

Mazama began construction of a clubhouse, restaurant, and health spa complex in 1979. The 46,000-square-foot (4,300 m^{2}) facility was finished a year later at a cost of $4.5 million. In addition, Mazama invested over $200,000 in course improvements. The company also applied for zoning changes to allow residential development on the property around the golf course. The city of Creswell approved building permits for 54 homes and a 250-unit motel on the Emerald Valley property, but financial problems delayed construction.

The Oregon Bank took over the golf course in 1984 after Mazama went bankrupt. In 1987, the bank offer to sell the Emerald Valley golf course and sports complex to Lane County, but the county decided not to purchase the property. A year later, the bank sold the golf course to a group of investors headed by Chicago businessman Steven Klemen. The Klemen group bought 150 acres (0.61 km^{2}) adjacent to the golf course, where they planned to develop 360 homes, although they ultimately built less than a dozen.

In 1993, the golf course was sold separately from the rest of the property to the Paloma Golf Group. This formally separated the golf course from the troubled resort and housing developments. Paloma invested in some course upgrades that improved the general aesthetics of the course and increased the operation’s revenue. Paloma sold the golf course to the Arnold Palmer Golf Management Company in 1997.

In 2002, the Palmer group sold the Emerald Valley golf course to Jim Pliska, a Portland area businessman and former member of the University of Oregon golf team. Pliska restored the course and added a new driving range and practice facility on 25 acres (100,000 m^{2}) of undeveloped land at the northeast corner of the property. A new irrigation system was installed in 2005.

Today, Emerald Valley is the home of the University of Oregon golf team. A dedicated facility was built for the team and opened in 2023.

== Course ==
Original Emerald Valley golf course layout, circa 1970

Emerald Valley Golf Club is located is on 170 acres (0.69 km^{2}) along the west bank of the Willamette River's Coast Fork, northeast of Creswell. The course was built on a flat tract of land along the river, and incorporates meandering doglegs and tree-lined fairways.

The original course was laid out in 1966 by Bob E. Baldock. In 2002, parts of the course were redesigned by Dan Hixon, a Portland golf course designer who had player at Emerald Valley when he was at college.

The course was designed for golfers of various skill levels. There are four tees settings, Gold being the longest. The first nine holes are a par 36, measuring 3,431 yards (3,137 m) from the Gold tees. The second nine holes are also a par 36 and measure 3,712 yards (3,394 m) from the Gold tees. The total length of the par 72 championship course is 7,143 yards (6,532 m). The shortest course is 5,421 yards (4,957 m).

Emerald Valley Scorecard
Tee	Rating/Slope	1	2	3	4	5	6	7	8	9	Out	10	11	12	13	14	15	16	17	18	In	Total
Par		4	3	5	4	3	4	5	4	4	36	4	3	4	5	4	4	5	3	5	36	72
Gold	74.0 / 130	422	167	495	405	209	453	558	300	411	3431	430	221	424	605	453	390	440	182	557	3712	7143
Blue	71.9 / 129	403	153	475	385	174	437	463	291	373	3154	412	170	388	545	430	356	394	149	532	3376	6530
White	69.7 / 125	380	134	453	375	155	407	447	281	357	2989	390	160	375	472	418	343	382	137	521	3198	6187
Red	71.6 / 131	369	125	417	316	137	326	369	271	344	2674	319	126	310	400	405	331	299	119	438	2747	5421
