= The Chronicle (Creswell, Oregon) =

Weekly newspaper published in Creswell, Oregon

The Creswell Chronicle
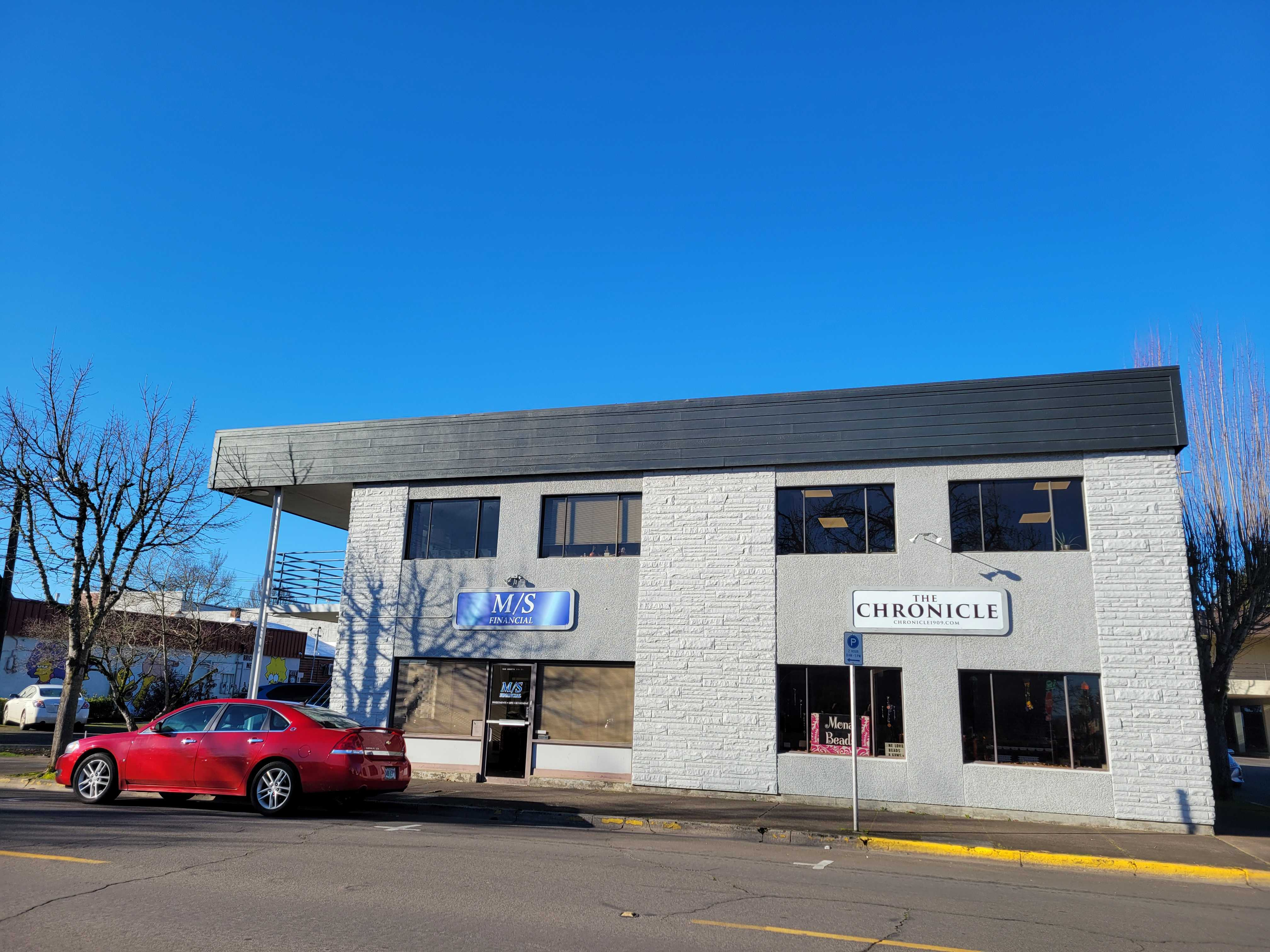
- Type: Weekly newspaper
- Owner: Nash Publishing Group
- Founder: George H. Baxter
- Publisher: Noel Nash
- Editor: Erin Tierney
- Founded: 1909
- Ceased publication: 2026
- Language: English
- Headquarters: 655 A St., Suite E, Springfield, OR 97477
- Website: chronicle1909.com

The Chronicle was a weekly newspaper serving the Southern Willamette Valley in Lane County, Oregon, United States from 1909 to 2026. Its area of coverage included Springfield, Creswell, Cottage Grove and Pleasant Hill.

== History ==
The Creswell Chronicle was first published on Sept. 30, 1909, by George H. Baxter. Chester Noland bought the paper from Baxter on April 10, 1913, who then required the paper in February 1916 but closed it in December 1917. Ival S. Wilson began publishing a spiritual successor to the paper called the Creswell New Era on Dec. 20,1946. Printing was briefly suspended in October 1948 after the paper's office caught fire. The Creswell New Era ceased on Nov. 30, 1950.

G.G. "Gerry" Sittser relaunched the Creswell Chronicle on Feb. 1, 1965. A year later he sold it to C.D. "Dave" Holman Jr., who also owned the Siuslaw News and was part-owner of the Newport News. The paper became a member of the Oregon Newspaper Publishers Association on Oct. 29, 1970. Dan and Judy Ramsey purchased the Chronicle in July 1974 and sold it to Ray S. and Alice P. Linker, who owned Lane Community Newspapers, on Jan. 7, 1976. The couple merged The Chronicle, the Lowell Lakeside News and the Pleasant Hill Pleasantimes.

Gerri O. O’Rourke purchased the paper on May 26, 1986, and sold it to Todd Hakes and Glen Albrethsen on Sept. 1, 2000. Hakes became the sole-owner on Jan. 1, 2003. Helen Hollyer became the paper's owner on April 1, 2004, and changed its name back to The Creswell Chronicle. Scott Olson purchased the paper from her in 2011, and sold it on March 1, 2019, to Noel Nash. Nash paid $60,000 for the paper and expanded coverage into Springfield. The paper moved its office to the town and changed its name to The Chronicle on August 29, 2019. The paper ceased on August 11, 2026.

== Awards ==
In 2020, The Chronicle earned 18 awards from the Oregon Newspaper Publishers Association for its news coverage, advertising and design. In 2023, the paper was named "Business of the Year" by the Springfield Area Chamber of Commerce.
