= Bertha Holt =

International adoption advocate

Bertha Marian Holt (February 5, 1904 – 2000) founded the Holt International Children's Services organization and fought to have the law changed in America to allow for more than two international adoptions.

== Background ==
Bertha Marian Holt was born on February 5, 1904, in Des Moines, Iowa to Clifford and Eva Holt. Her father was a school teacher and a mail carrier. She received her nursing degree in 1926, and married her cousin Harry Holt, on December 31, 1927. They moved to South Dakota where they were “custom farmers,” which meant they worked the land owned by others until they could save for their own land. During the Depression, they had to leave their farm and move to Willamette Valley in Oregon. They prospered in Oregon, eventually owning a lumber mill.

== Adoptions ==
In 1954, Bertha, a nurse, and her husband, a farmer, and lumberjack, went to a high school auditorium in Eugene, Oregon, to watch a film about children in Amerasian South Korean orphanages. The Holts started to send money to South Korean orphanages but soon decided to do more. They both wanted to adopt eight children but kept this idea to themselves because they figured the other spouse would think this was too many. Federal law at the time didn't allow any family to adopt more than two foreign born children.

In 1955, Congress passed the Bill for Relief of Certain War Orphans, specifically so that the Holt family could adopt eight children. They adopted four boys and four girls ranging in age from babies to three and a half.

== Agency creation ==
In 1956, the Holts founded the Holt International Children's Services. There was no system in place at the time for international adoptions. Grandma Holt, as she was known, continued to be active in the agency until the day she died.

While in South Korea in 1964, Harry Holt had a heart attack and died. Many believed the agency would close, but Mrs. Holt took over and traveled tirelessly. She worked to improve conditions at the IlSan Center in Korea where the Holts built an orphanage and she lobbied other countries to set up adoption programs.

== Family life ==
The Holts children include Molly Holt, Barbara Chambers, Suzanne Peterson, Linda Pack, Wanda Holt, Stuart Holt, Joe Holt, Robert Holt, Nat Holt, Paul Holt, Mary Last, Christine Russell, Helen Stampe, and Betty Blankenship. She had three sisters, Beulah Stronczek, Katherine Stanger and Grace Fisher; a brother, William L. Holt; 19 grandchildren, and 12 great-grandchildren at the time of her death.

== Awards ==
- 2002, induction into the National Women's Hall of Fame

== Death ==
Bertha died at the age of 96 in the year 2000 at her home in Creswell, Oregon.

== Books ==
- The Seed From The East by Bertha Holt and David Wisner
- Bring My Sons From Afar: The unfolding of Harry Holt's dream by Bertha Holt
- Created for God's Glory by Bertha Holt
