= Geographies of Kinship =

Geographies Of Kinship is a 2019 documentary film. It explores the history of the international adoption of South Korean children. The film was directed by Deann Borshay Liem. The film is the third documentary by the Emmy-winning filmmaker to explore international adoption, adopting a wider lens than her prior autobiographical work.
