= Creswell, Oregon =

- City
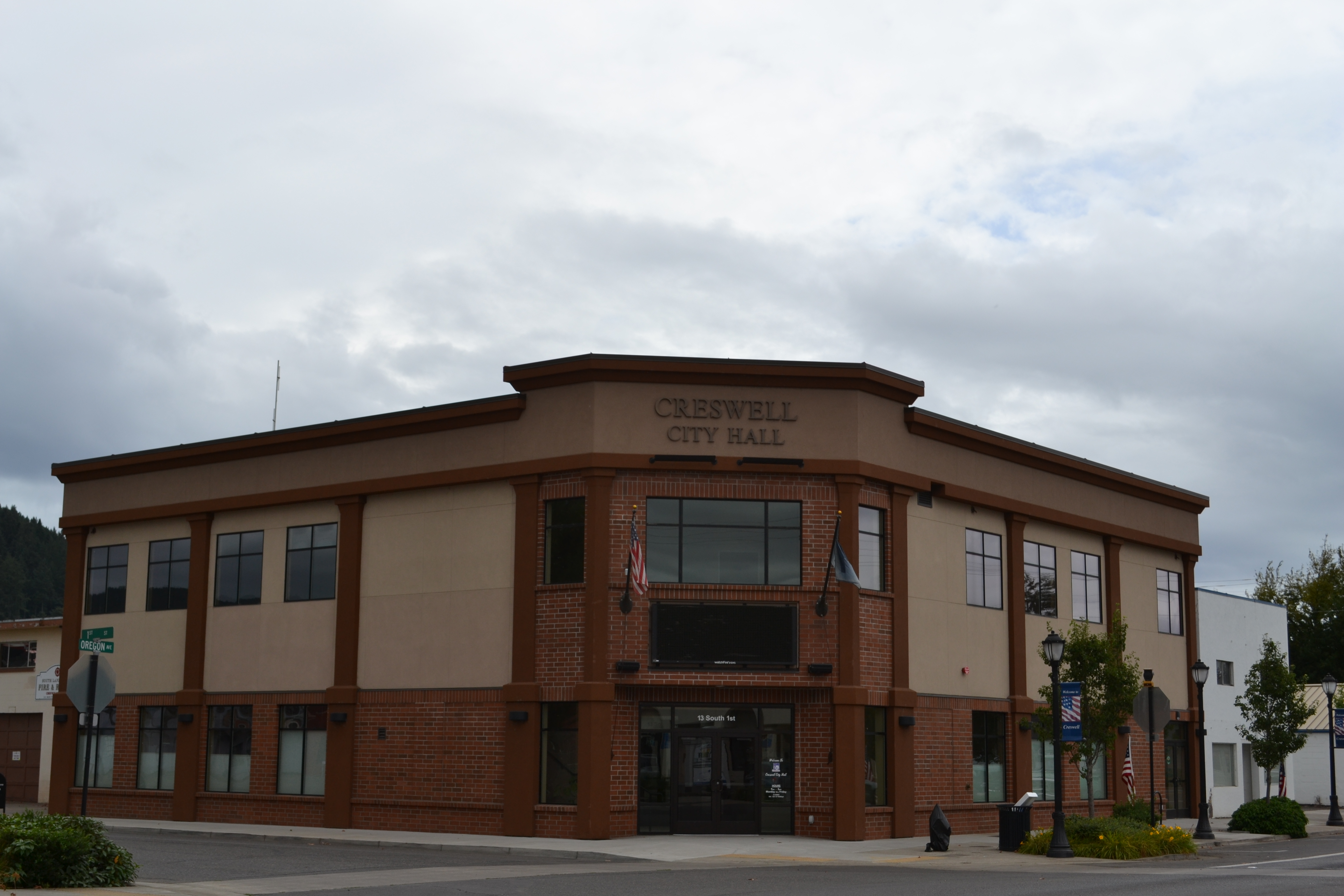
- Creswell City Hall
- Nickname: The Friendly City
- Location in Oregon
- Coordinates: 43°55′15″N 123°00′20″W
- Country: United States
- State: Oregon
- County: Lane
- Incorporated: 1909

Area
  - Total: 1.73 sq mi (4.48 km^{2})
  - Land: 1.71 sq mi (4.44 km^{2})
  - Water: 0.015 sq mi (0.04 km^{2})
- Elevation: 541 ft (165 m)

Population (2020)
  - Total: 5,641
  - Density: 3,289.1/sq mi (1,269.94/km^{2})
- Time zone: UTC-8 (Pacific)
  - Summer (DST): UTC-7 (Pacific)
- ZIP code: 97426
- Area code: 541
- FIPS code: 41-16950
- GNIS feature ID: 2410264
- Website: www.ci.creswell.or.us

Creswell is a city in the Willamette Valley of Lane County, Oregon, United States, located 12 miles (19 km) south of Eugene, Oregon. As of the 2020 census, Creswell had a population of 5,641.

== History ==
The first store opened at Creswell in 1872, and a town sprang up around it. The city was named for John Creswell, 23rd United States Postmaster General. A post office has been in operation in Creswell since 1872.

== Geography ==
According to the United States Census Bureau, the city has a total area of 1.72 square miles (4.45 km^{2}), of which, 1.70 square miles (4.40 km^{2}) is land and 0.02 square miles (0.05 km^{2}) is water.

=== Climate ===
Climate data for Creswell, Oregon
Month	Jan	Feb	Mar	Apr	May	Jun	Jul	Aug	Sep	Oct	Nov	Dec	Year
Mean daily maximum °F (°C)	48.1 (8.9)	52.0 (11.1)	56.4 (13.6)	61.3 (16.3)	68.1 (20.1)	73.7 (23.2)	82.4 (28.0)	83.2 (28.4)	77.4 (25.2)	65.3 (18.5)	53.3 (11.8)	46.7 (8.2)	64 (18)
Daily mean °F (°C)	41.4 (5.2)	43.5 (6.4)	46.5 (8.1)	50.4 (10.2)	56.1 (13.4)	60.9 (16.1)	67.1 (19.5)	67.2 (19.6)	62.5 (16.9)	53.9 (12.2)	45.7 (7.6)	40.6 (4.8)	53.0 (11.7)
Mean daily minimum °F (°C)	34.6 (1.4)	34.9 (1.6)	36.6 (2.6)	39.5 (4.2)	44.1 (6.7)	48.1 (8.9)	51.7 (10.9)	51.2 (10.7)	47.5 (8.6)	42.4 (5.8)	38.1 (3.4)	34.5 (1.4)	41.9 (5.5)
Average precipitation inches (mm)	5.88 (149)	4.75 (121)	4.94 (125)	4.03 (102)	2.61 (66)	1.53 (39)	0.4 (10)	0.41 (10)	1.24 (31)	3.45 (88)	6.09 (155)	7.35 (187)	42.68 (1,084)
Source: https://www.plantmaps.com/en/clim/f/us/oregon/creswell/climate-data

== Demographics ==
Historical population
Census	Pop.	Note	%±
1910	367		—
1920	273		−25.6%
1930	345		26.4%
1940	497		44.1%
1950	662		33.2%
1960	760		14.8%
1970	1,199		57.8%
1980	1,770		47.6%
1990	2,431		37.3%
2000	3,579		47.2%
2010	5,031		40.6%
2020	5,641		12.1%
U.S. Decennial Census

=== 2020 census ===
As of the 2020 census, Creswell had a population of 5,641. The median age was 38.5 years. 24.0% of residents were under the age of 18 and 18.2% of residents were 65 years of age or older. For every 100 females there were 93.1 males, and for every 100 females age 18 and over there were 91.2 males age 18 and over.

As of the 2020 census, 100.0% of residents lived in urban areas, while 0% lived in rural areas.

As of the 2020 census, there were 2,116 households in Creswell, of which 34.1% had children under the age of 18 living in them. Of all households, 52.4% were married-couple households, 14.1% were households with a male householder and no spouse or partner present, and 24.6% were households with a female householder and no spouse or partner present. About 21.6% of all households were made up of individuals and 10.4% had someone living alone who was 65 years of age or older.

As of the 2020 census, there were 2,177 housing units, of which 2.8% were vacant. Among occupied housing units, 75.0% were owner-occupied and 25.0% were renter-occupied. The homeowner vacancy rate was 0.3% and the rental vacancy rate was 4.1%.

Racial composition as of the 2020 census
Race	Number	Percent
White	4,720	83.7%
Black or African American	21	0.4%
American Indian and Alaska Native	76	1.3%
Asian	61	1.1%
Native Hawaiian and Other Pacific Islander	10	0.2%
Some other race	202	3.6%
Two or more races	551	9.8%
Hispanic or Latino (of any race)	557	9.9%

=== 2010 census ===
As of the census of 2010, there were 5,031 people, 1,906 households, and 1,366 families living in the city. The population density was 2,959.4 inhabitants per square mile (1,142.6/km^{2}). There were 2,023 housing units at an average density of 1,190.0 per square mile (459.5/km^{2}). The racial makeup of the city was 89.6% White, 0.4% African American, 1.0% Native American, 1.0% Asian, 0.1% Pacific Islander, 4.1% from other races, and 3.7% from two or more races. Hispanic or Latino of any race were 8.6% of the population.

There were 1,906 households, of which 37.3% had children under the age of 18 living with them, 54.2% were married couples living together, 12.6% had a female householder with no husband present, 4.8% had a male householder with no wife present, and 28.3% were non-families. 21.7% of all households were made up of individuals, and 7.1% had someone living alone who was 65 years of age or older. The average household size was 2.61 and the average family size was 3.01.

The median age in the city was 35.7 years. 26.8% of residents were under the age of 18; 6.9% were between the ages of 18 and 24; 28.9% were from 25 to 44; 25.7% were from 45 to 64; and 11.8% were 65 years of age or older. The gender makeup of the city was 48.7% male and 51.3% female.

=== 2000 census ===
As of the census of 2000, there were 3,579 people, 1,271 households, and 911 families living in the city. The population density was 2,957.0 inhabitants per square mile (1,141.7/km^{2}). There were 1,343 housing units at an average density of 1,109.6 per square mile (428.4/km^{2}). The racial makeup of the city was 89.02% White, 0.31% African American, 1.82% Native American, 0.53% Asian, 0.17% Pacific Islander, 4.08% from other races, and 4.08% from two or more races. Hispanic or Latino of any race were 7.01% of the population. There were 1,271 households, out of which 41.4% had children under the age of 18 living with them, 53.1% were married couples living together, 13.5% had a female householder with no husband present, and 28.3% were non-families. 21.6% of all households were made up of individuals, and 8.7% had someone living alone who was 65 years of age or older. The average household size was 2.77 and the average family size was 3.21.

In the city, the population 31.3% under the age of 18, 8.5% from 18 to 24, 30.8% from 25 to 44, 18.4% from 45 to 64, and 11.0% who were 65 years of age or older. The median age was 32 years. For every 100 females, there were 90.5 males. For every 100 females age 18 and over, there were 89.7 males.

The median income for a household in the city was $34,053, and the median income for a family was $40,709. Males had a median income of $28,583 versus $22,917 for females. The per capita income for the city was $13,736. About 15.3% of families and 19.0% of the population were below the poverty line, including 24.1% of those under age 18 and 5.3% of those age 65 or over.

== Parks and recreation ==
Creswell is the home of the Emerald Valley Golf Club. The course is located on 170 acres (0.69 km^{2}) along the west bank of the Willamette River's Coast Fork. It was built in 1966 by James and Eugene Russell. After a series of owners, businessman Jim Pliska bought the golf course in 2002. Today, Emerald Valley Golf Club is the home of the University of Oregon golf team.

== Education ==
The Creswell School District has three schools: Creslane Elementary School, Creswell Middle School, and Creswell High School.

== Media ==
The Creswell Chronicle is the city's weekly newspaper

== Transportation ==
The city has a general aviation airport, Hobby Field, (IATA airport code:77S, ICAO airport code: 77S), and is located on Interstate 5 and Oregon Route 99. Lane County Transit (LTD) has limited bus service to Creswell.

== Notable people ==
- Mark Few, head coach for the Gonzaga Bulldogs men's basketball team
- Bertha Holt, founded the Holt International Children's Services organization.
- Luke Jackson, basketball player
