= South Korean social purification project =

1970s and 1980s government program

In South Korea, during the military dictatorship in the 1970s and 1980s, the government pursued a "social purification" program that forced thousands of people off the streets into welfare centers.

A catalyst that intensified this, was the 1986 Asian Games and the 1988 Seoul Olympics. An ordinance from April 1981, known as ordinance No. 410, by President Chun Doo-hwan ordered authorities to crack down on vagrants. The ordinance allowed the arbitrary detention of vagrants who were transferred in buses with signs that read "Vagrants' Transport Vehicle". Police were alleged to have been rewarded for "purifying" the streets, targeting rough sleepers, disabled people, some orphan children. The welfare centres were mostly privately run but were given subsidies based on the number of people they took care of. A notable welfare center was known as Brothers Home.

Inmates were forced into unpaid labour, such as on construction projects, farms and factories. They were often subjected to beatings and solitary confinement. If they gave birth, the children were taken away to be adopted abroad. When inmates died, some were buried or had their bodies donated to medical schools without attempting to inform their families. An estimated 16,000 people were forced into such welfare centers.

Truth and Reconciliation Commissions have investigated atrocities but no one has yet been convicted for crimes committed.

== See also ==
- Colombia social cleansing
