= Gowe (musician) =

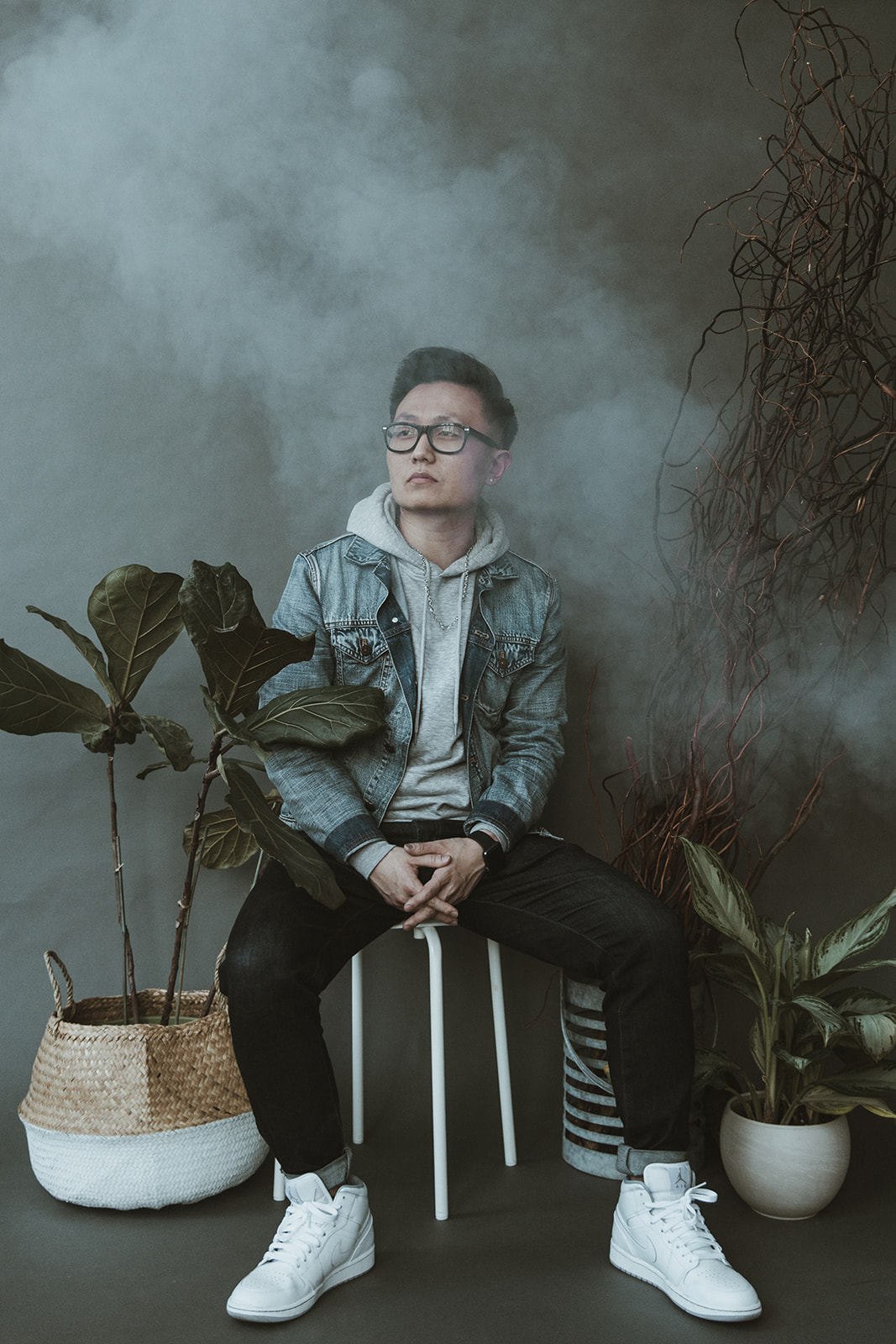

Background information
- Born: Gordon Tsai; Seoul, South Korea
- Origin: Seattle, Washington
- Genres: Hip hop
- Years active: 2012-present
- Label: Hypergiants Collective
- Website: gowehiphop.com

Gordon Tsai, more widely known by his stage name Gowe (pronounced 'go'), is an American Hip Hop artist from Seattle, Washington. To date, he has released three full-length albums and one EP as a solo musician.

Gowe debuted with We are Hypergiants in 2012 as an independent musician. Later that year, he released the Summer Breeze Sonatas EP, featuring five tracks. The Korean Edit of We Are Hypergiants released in early 2015 through the musician's partnership with independent record label Good Fruit Co. The rapper released his sophomore studio effort, Music Beautiful, on March 30, 2015. In 2019, Gowe made his return to music by releasing various singles and followed up with his studio EP Nostalgia Forever on May 5, 2020. Gowe released his third full-length LP Jazznight on May 14, 2021.

== Life and career ==
=== Personal life ===
Gordon was born in Seoul, South Korea. He grew up in Beacon Hill, Seattle, Washington, and was largely influenced at an early age by the music of New York rapper Nas. He was raised in a Chinese-American family, and at the age of eighteen, he discovered he was adopted.

=== Musical career ===
Gowe's first notable appearance as a musician was in 2010, when he performed as one of eight competitors in the first annual Kollaboration Seattle showcase. Soon afterwards, the musician began building a following on YouTube, earning thousands of views per video.

His professional musical career began with his debut studio album We Are Hypergiants, released on June 17, 2012. The album featured 11 tracks, featuring guest appearances by well-known singers Travis Graham (of New Heights), Erin Kim, Jennifer Chung, Paul Kim, and Sam Ock. The rapper also released the three singles "I Wonder," "Star in My Eyes," and "First Flight" with accompanying music video performances around the time of the album's release.

Shortly after the release of We Are Hypergiants, Wong Fu Productions used track 11, "Star in My Eyes" as the official theme song in 2013 for the Take Your Shot Campaign, launched by Wong Fu in partnership with AT&T. The single was also featured in The White Frog film's original soundtrack as one of 10 musical performances. Korean Pop blog allkpop also featured "I Wonder" from the album, highlighting it as "an incredibly poignant piece that really grasps at your heartstrings with its emotional, yet thoughtful lyrics."

On December 2, 2012, Gowe released a free five-track EP titled Summer Breeze Sonatas. This project was featured on Christian Hip Hop outlet Rapzilla and Hip Hop outlet DJ Booth.

Not long afterwards, the rapper released a free single titled "Aurora" with an accompanying music video performance featuring original animation. Shortly after its February 18, 2013 release, the music video was featured on entertainment website IGN, video game website ScrewAttack, and Christian Hip Hop outlet Rapzilla. The video quickly garnered over 200,000 views.

On June 30, 2013, Gowe was interviewed by Christian Hip Hop publication Jam The Hype.

A year later, the musician announced plans to join independent label Good Fruit Co's artist roster.

Also in 2014, Gowe joined hip hop artists MC Jin, Sam Ock, J. Han, CL, NAK, and Mickey Cho on the Fearless Tour hosted by independent record label Good Fruit Co. The national tour brought the Seattle rapper to Alameda, California, Irvine, California, Centreville, Virginia, and Germantown, Maryland. He was one of several artists who gathered to make history as the first time every Asian American Christian Hip Hop artist stood in one room.

On November 16, 2014, Gowe released "Lavender," the first single off of his sophomore studio album, Music Beautiful. The single was released with an accompanying music video performance, which was featured on music blog Potholes in My Blog and Christian Hip Hop outlet Rapzilla

On February 6, 2015, the Korean Edit of We Are Hypergiants was released in South Korea through Gowe's partnership with Good Fruit Co.

Gowe released his sophomore studio album, Music Beautiful, on March 30, 2015, featuring 10 tracks.

In 2019, Gowe returned to music by releasing his highly anticipated single "Worth The Wait" Feat. Sam Ock, a follow up to the rapper's popular "Wait For You".

On May 5, 2020, Gowe released his second LP Nostalgia Forever, a synthwave hip-hop album.

On May 14, 2021, Gowe released his third full-length LP Jazznight. In the album, Gowe discusses meeting his biological mother "Face to Face", welcoming a daughter "Arie", his voice as an Asian American "Americana", and features appearances by NAK, Uzuhan, Jennifer Chung, ESAE, postmoderndisco, and Mickey Cho.

== Discography ==
=== Albums ===
- We Are Hypergiants (2012)
- Summer Breeze Sonatas EP (2012)
- Music Beautiful (2015)
- Nostalgia Forever EP (2020)
- Jazznight (2021)
