= Global Overseas Adoptees' Link =

South Korean organization

Global Overseas Adoptees' Link (G.O.A.'L) is an organization in Seoul, South Korea, for adoptees.

== History ==
The first major task of GOAL was to lobby for the inclusion of adoptees in the Overseas Koreans Act. This act was passed in 1999 and allowed adoptees residency on a F-4 visa. The visa gives every adoptee the right to reside and work in Korea for three years at a time and can be renewed. GOAL was founded in 1997.

On 29 December 2010, GOAL opened its first overseas branch, GOAL USA, in Santa Barbara.

== Main Services ==
- Birth Family Search in cooperation with adoption agencies, Korean and international media (KBS, YTN, National Assembly TV etc.)
- Annual conference
- Translation, interpretation
- Korean language education and scholarships
- General support including F-4 visa
- Motherland tours

== Activities ==
GOAL also ran the Dual Citizenship Campaign that granted adoptees Korean nationality. It is also advocating adoptees' rights within Korea.
