= Journal of Adolescent Research =

- Discipline: Psychology
- Language: English
- Edited by: Nancy L. Deutsch

Publication details
- History: 1986–present
- Publisher: SAGE Publications (United States)
- Frequency: Bimonthly
- Impact factor: 1.964 (2017)

Standard abbreviations
- ISO 4: J. Adolesc. Res.

Indexing
- ISSN: 0743-5584 (print); 1552-6895 (web)
- LCCN: 88659396
- OCLC no.: 10608553

Links
- Journal homepage; Online access; Online archive

Journal of Adolescent Research is a peer-reviewed academic journal that publishes papers in the field of Psychology. This journal is a member of the Committee on Publication Ethics (COPE). The journal's editor is Nancy L. Deutsch (University of Virginia). It has been in publication since 1986 and is currently published by SAGE Publications. Research published in this journal specialize in qualitative and mixed-method research focusing on adolescent and emerging adult development from a variety of disciplinary perspectives.

== Abstracting and indexing ==
Journal of Adolescent Research is abstracted and indexed in, among other databases: SCOPUS, and the Social Sciences Citation Index. According to the Journal Citation Reports, its 2017 impact factor is 1.964, ranking it 33 out of 73 journals in the category ‘Psychology, Developmental’.
