= Child Citizenship Act of 2000 =

United States federal law

- Long title: An Act To amend the Immigration and Nationality Act to modify the provisions governing acquisition of citizenship by children born outside of the United States, and for other purposes.
- Enacted by: the 106th United States Congress

Citations
- Public law: Pub. L. 106–395 (text) (PDF)
- Statutes at Large: 114 Stat. 1631

Codification
- Acts amended: Immigration and Nationality Act of 1965
- Titles amended: 8 U.S.C.: Aliens and Nationality

Legislative history
- Introduced in the House as H.R. 2883 by Lamar Smith (R–TX) on September 21, 1999; Committee consideration by House Judiciary Committee; Passed the House on September 19, 2000 (unanimous consent); Passed the Senate on October 12, 2000 (unanimous consent); Signed into law by President Bill Clinton on October 30, 2000

The Child Citizenship Act of 2000 (CCA) is a United States federal law that amended the Immigration and Nationality Act of 1965 regarding acquisition of citizenship by children of United States citizens. Under the CCA, certain children born outside the United States who did not obtain citizenship at birth may obtain citizenship automatically after being admitted to the United States as legal permanent residents (CCA § 101) or may be eligible for expeditious naturalization (CCA § 102).

The act also added protections for non-citizens who had voted in federal elections on the reasonable but mistaken belief that they were United States citizens at the time they voted, or that they had falsely claimed to be United States citizens in the past because they reasonably believed they were United States citizens at the time of the false claim (CCA § 201).

== Provisions ==
=== Title I: Citizenship for certain children born outside the United States ===
==== Section 101. Automatic acquisition of citizenship for certain children born outside the United States ====
The following requirements must be met for automatic citizenship of a child born outside of the United States:

1. The child must have at least one United States citizen parent, by birth or naturalization
2. The child must be living in the legal and physical custody of the United States citizen parent
3. The child must be lawfully admitted to the United States as legal permanent resident

The law does not apply to children who were 18 years of age on or before February 27, 2001, the act's effective date. Children adopted by United States citizen parents benefit from the law if they meet the definition of child found at INA § 101(b)(1); 8 U.S.C. § 1101(b)(1) and the parents complete a full and final adoption in either the country of origin or in the United States.

This section of the CCA was implemented as INA § 320; 8 U.S.C. § 1431.

Children who are citizens under the CCA do not typically receive documentation of their citizenship status automatically, though the parents of adopted children who entered the United States on IR-3 visas on or after January 1, 2004, should receive a Certificate of Citizenship from the USCIS after the child arrives in the country. Similarly, parents of adopted children who entered the United States on IH-3 visas on or after April 1, 2008, also receive a Certificate of Citizenship from the USCIS, without the need to apply for one. Parents or children who do not receive a Certificate of Citizenship automatically must apply to the USCIS for a Certificate of Citizenship. Children covered by the CCA may also apply for a US passport as proof of their citizenship.

==== Section 102. Acquisition of certificate of citizenship for certain children born outside the United States ====
The following requirements must be met for expeditious naturalization:

1. The child must have at least one parent who is a citizen of the United States by birth or naturalization
2. The United States citizen parent must have been physically present in the United States or its outlying possessions for a period or periods totaling not less than five years, at least two of which were after attaining the age of fourteen years; or the United States citizen must have a citizen parent who has been physically present in the United States or its outlying possessions for a period or periods totaling not less than five years, at least two of which were after attaining the age of fourteen years
3. The child must be under the age of eighteen years
4. The child must be residing outside of the United States in the legal and physical custody of the citizen parent
5. The child must be temporarily present in the United States pursuant to a lawful admission and must be maintaining such lawful status

Expeditious naturalization allows children of US citizens whose parents do not have the required physical presence to pass on citizenship to use their grandparents' physical presence instead to qualify for United States citizenship. It also serves as an alternate path to United States citizenship for children of US citizens who did not acquire citizenship at birth and who are not immigrating to the United States as lawful permanent residents. The application is made using USCIS Form N-600K. Upon approval, the child enters the United States, usually as a visitor with a B-2 visa, to attend an immigration appointment and oath ceremony. Upon taking the oath, a Certificate of Citizenship is issued.

Adopted children are also covered if they meet the definition of child found at INA § 101(b)(1); 8 U.S.C. ¢ 1101(b)(1).

This section of the CCA was implemented as INA § 322; 8 U.S.C. § 1433.

==== Section 103. Conforming amendment ====
This section repealed former INA § 321.

==== Section 104. Effective date ====
The effective date of the Child Citizenship Act is February 27, 2001. Children who meet the requirements of the Act on that date automatically became U.S. citizens. Children who were 18 years of age or older on that date did not acquire U.S. citizenship from the Child Citizenship Act of 2000.

=== Title II: Protections for certain aliens voting based on reasonable belief of citizenship ===
Non-citizens are prohibited by law from voting in US federal elections. 18 U.S.C. § 611 makes unlawful voting a felony. Unlawful voting in any election is also evidence of bad moral character (INA § 101(f); 8 U.S.C. § 1101(f)), a ground of inadmissibility (INA § 212(a)(10)(D); 8 U.S.C. 1182(a)(10)(D)), and a ground of removability (INA § 237(a)(6); 8 U.S.C. § 1227(a)(6)). Falsely claiming citizenship is also prohibited. 18 U.S.C. § 1015 makes a false claim to United States citizenship for the purposes of obtaining any Federal or State benefit or US employment a felony. A false claim to United States citizenship is also a ground of inadmissibility (212(a)(6)(C)(ii); 8 U.S.C. § 1182(a)(6)(C)(ii)) and a ground of removability (INA § 237(a)(3)(D); 8 U.S.C. § 1227(a)(3)(D)). Congress was concerned that individuals in the United States from childhood might reasonably believe they were United States citizens. To deal with the extremely harsh consequences for individuals with a good faith but mistaken belief in their citizenship, Section 201 of the CCA established protections if certain conditions are met.

==== Good moral character ====
The CCA amended the good moral character definition at INA § 101(f); 8 U.S.C. § 1101(f) to protect individuals who registered to vote or voted if they meet the requirements.

==== Inadmissibility ====
The CCA amended the inadmissibility ground at INA § 212(a)(10)(D); 8 U.S.C. § 1182(a)(10)(D) to protect individuals who voted and also amended the inadmissibility ground at INA § 212(a)(6)(C)(ii); 8 U.S.C. § 1182(a)(6)(C)(ii) to protect individuals who may have falsely claimed to be US citizens if they meet the requirements.

==== Removability (Deportation) ====
The CCA amended the removability ground at INA § 237(a)(6); 8 U.S.C. § 1227(a)(6) to protect individuals who voted and also amended the removability ground at INA § 237(a)(3)(D); 8 U.S.C. § 1227(a)(3)(D) to protect individuals who may have falsely claimed to be US citizens if they meet the requirements.

==== Federal criminal prosecution ====
The CCA amended the criminal code at 18 U.S.C. § 611 to protect individuals who voted and also amended the criminal code at 18 U.S.C. § 1015 to protect individuals who may have falsely claimed to be US citizens if they meet the requirements.

==== Requirements for protection under the CCA for mistake of citizenship ====
The protections found in Title II of the CCA apply only if:

1. Both parents (either natural or adoptive) is or was a United States citizen whether by birth or naturalization
2. The non-citizen was residing permanently in the United States prior to turning 16 years old
3. The non-citizen reasonable believed they were a United States citizen

==== Effective date for Title II of the CCA ====
Unlike Title I, which took effect in 2001, the changes to the INA in Title II apply to anyone applying for a benefit or subject to prosecution on or after September 30, 1996.

== Adoptee Citizenship Act ==
The Adoptee Citizenship Act is a series of bills in the United States Congress, dating back to 2015, that attempt to remedy the lack of United States citizenship for thousands of intercountry adoptees who were adopted by United States citizens as children. The legislation, first introduced in 2015 and reintroduced in Congress in 2018, 2019, 2021, and 2024, amends the Child Citizenship Act of 2000 to close a loophole that has prevented adopted people from acquiring United States citizenship through their adoptive parents. Under the Child Citizenship Act, intercountry adopted children do not qualify for acquired citizenship through their adoptive parents if they were 18 years or older on February 27, 2001, the effective date of the act. If these adoptees never naturalized while they were children, they did not become United States citizens and remain at risk for deportation unless they naturalized later as adults.

In September 2025, Senator Mazie Hirono and US Representative Adam Smith introduced legislation titled The Protecting Adoptees and American Families Act, or the PAAF Act for short. While the title of the 2025 bill is different from previous legislation, the content and purpose of the PAAF Act is identical to prior versions of the Adoptee Citizenship Act.

== In popular culture ==
- Blue Bayou, a film written and directed by Justin Chon, depicts a Korean-American man who was adopted by a white family and is at risk for deportation because his parents did not file for his citizenship. The movie is based on true stories about interracial adoption, which is related to the Child Citizenship Act of 2000.

== See also ==
- Deportation of Korean adoptees from the United States
