= Spence-Chapin Services to Families and Children =

- Company type: Private
- Industry: Nonprofit, International and Domestic Adoption Services
- Founded: 1908
- Founders: Clara Spence; Dr. and Mrs. Henry Dwight Chapin
- Headquarters: Main office in Manhattan (NYC, USA) with satellite offices in New Jersey and Long Island, United States
- Area served: Licensed to provide adoption services in New York and New Jersey. Work with over 50 partner agencies across the United States.
- Key people: Clara Spence; Alice Chapin; Henry Dwight Chapin, MD; Dorothea Coe; Helen B. Montgomery; Jane D. Edwards; Alice Hall Dowling; Katharine S. Legg
- Revenue: 8,210,122 United States dollar (2017)
- Total assets: 55,626,653 United States dollar (2022)
- Website: spence-chapin.org

Spence-Chapin Services to Families and Children is a New York-based licensed and Hague-accredited non-profit providing adoption services, which includes the continuum of counseling and support services to members of the adoption triad: birth parents, adoptive families, and adoptees. They provide interim care for infants as the biological parents make a plan for the child's future, and also specialize in the adoption of older children, sibling groups and children with special needs.

Spence-Chapin's roots can be traced to the work of Clara Spence and Henry Dwight Chapin and his wife. Working on behalf of babies and birth mothers, they each established nurseries in the early 1900s for infants abandoned in hospitals and shelters. The two nurseries merged in 1943 and became Spence-Chapin Adoption Service.

Taking care of the undernourished and neglected children in their home, Henry Dwight Chapin, a specialist in infants, and his wife established the Alice Chapin Nursery in 1911. For 20 years Alice Chapin served as the president of the nursery. Chapin expanded her work first into the Children's Aid building at Lexington Avenue and 127th Street and then purchased an old Chelsea house at 444 West 22d Street. She retired in 1936 when her husband became ill but remained active for years as honorary president of the Spence‐Chapin Services. One year after Henry Chapin's death in 1942, the nursery joined the Spence Alumni Society to form the Spence‐Chapin Adoption Service.

In 2004, Spence-Chapin agreed to preserve and manage Louise Wise Services’ adoption records. Spence-Chapin also maintains the Talbot Perkins and Sophia Fund adoption records.

== History ==
At the turn of the twentieth century, Henry Dwight Chapin, M.D., initiated reforms in institutional care for infants and in the foster home movement. His studies revealed that individual care is far superior to life in the best institution. Chapin founded the Speedwell Society to place abandoned infants with select foster mothers until they could be placed in permanent adoptive homes. In recognizing the importance of a family to a child, he began the Alice Chapin Adoption Nursery (named after his wife who oversaw the nursery) as a transition to boarding homes for pre-adoptive care.

Concurrently, Clara B. Spence was a dedicated educator and activist in the movement to safeguard abandoned infants. At a time when social norms considered adoption of a non-relative to be bizarre, she promoted adoption as a superior alternative to institutional care. Spence founded the Spence School for girls in 1892. She introduced her students to adoption as a fulfilling form of social work. In 1915, alumnae of the school opened the Spence Alumnae Society nursery. In 1921, Spence chaired a British-American coalition that brought thirteen British infants to the United States to be adopted into American families, helping to create what is today a vast network of international adoption.

Both nurseries became vested in the evolution of how unwanted infants were managed, from institutions-based methods to what is considered a more humane treatment that recognized their worth and value to society. Social work techniques in adoption were developed, best practices were introduced to the public and prevailing cultural attitudes were addressed. Respected public figures of the time, such as Margaret A. Mead, M.D., joined their efforts in tackling cultural attitudes towards adoption. Robust fundraising campaigns began to better inform the public about the need for sound adoption services and to raise funds for rapidly expanding services.

The 1940s was a pivotal decade for Spence-Chapin. The nurseries merged in 1943. In 1948 the Spence-Chapin Adoption Service became incorporated and began working with the City of New York to place “boarder babies”, or abandoned children languishing in City hospitals and shelters.

Adoption for minority children began gaining traction in the 1940s. Spence-Chapin's commitment to finding loving adoptive families for black infants made its African American Adoption Program one of the first in the United States. Active outreach for African American parents had been a priority since 1946. Throughout the 1950s, eminent women such as First Lady Eleanor Roosevelt, Mrs. Hubert Thomas Delany, Mrs. Ralph J. Bunche, Marian Anderson, and Mrs. Jackie Robinson helped to promote Spence-Chapin's recruitment of African-American adoptive families.

Spence-Chapin established a new adoption and child welfare agency in Harlem known as Harlem-Dowling Children's Service, to provide social services to single black mothers. Designed to meet the community's needs, Harlem-Dowling was managed and staffed by black professionals. It became an independent agency in 1980.

Outreach to underserved communities continued to grow in the 1950s, with awareness of service and financing needs for children with medical needs. This includes genetic conditions such as spina bifida, sickle cell anemia and Down Syndrome, but it can also be developmental delays or a result of prenatal substance or HIV/AIDS exposure. It led to the creation of a formal program in 1995, A Special Adoption Program (ASAP), to find adoptive parents for infants and young children with special needs.

The knowledge base in adoption and child welfare was an area that the organization's board of directors envisioned dedicated support for. In 1996 they established The Donaldson Adoption Institute. Its mission as an independent and objective adoption research, education, and advocacy organization was to address the needs of birth parents, adopted people, adoptive parents, and the professionals that serve them.

Adoption in the 21st century continues to evolve in significant ways; for example, regarding the changing mores and attitudes towards single parenthood and LGBTQ adoptions, and abortion. In recognition of the need to help women explore all options after an unplanned pregnancy, Spence-Chapin began an initiative to bridge the gap between abortion clinics and adoption agencies across the country with The Adoption Access Network.

== Current programs and services ==
Spence-Chapin provides services and resources to support members of the adoption triad – birth parents, adoptive families, and adoptees – as they navigate complex issues throughout their lives.

A unique service is the Interim Care Provider Program, which trains volunteer caregivers in nurturing infants during the first few weeks after birth. This gives women and their partners time and space to make a decision about the future of their family. Caregivers are trained to care properly for newborns, which includes taking them to medical appointments, and providing round-the-clock feedings and diaper changes.

== Recognition ==
2014-18 Spence-Chapin was awarded the “All Children - All Families” Innovator Seal of Recognition by the Human Rights Campaign.

2016 Recognition as an Adoption-Friendly Workplace by Dave Thomas Foundation for Adoption

2018 Spence-Chapin was recognized as an Innovator in LGBTQ Inclusion by the Human Rights Campaign.

== Records ==
Spence-Chapin holds thousands of records from its 110+ year history, as well as the records for Louise Wise Services, Talbot Perkins (prior to 1960), and the Sophia Fund agencies which are now closed. Adult adoptees, former foster children 18+ years of age, birth parents, adoptive parents of children under the age of 18, and biological siblings of adoptees, 18+ years of age, whose adoption or foster care was planned through Spence-Chapin, Louise Wise Services, Talbot Perkins, or the Sophia Fund are eligible to apply for non-identifying record information from Spence-Chapin. The Louise Wise “Twin Study” records remain sealed at Yale University until the year 2065.
