= Hobby Field =

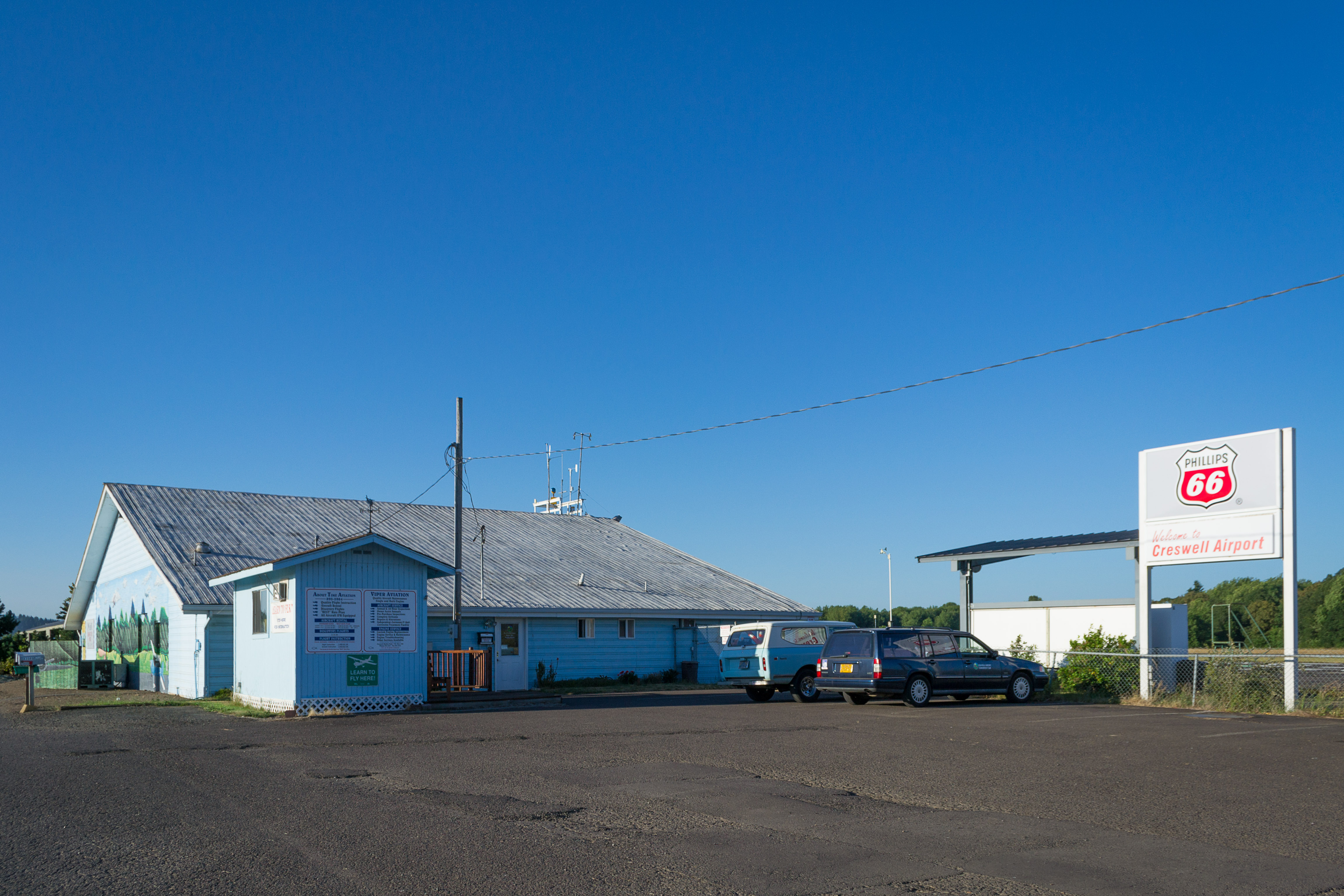
- IATA: none; ICAO: K77S; FAA LID: 77S

Summary
- Airport type: Public
- Operator: City of Creswell
- Location: Creswell, Oregon
- Elevation AMSL: 538 ft / 164 m
- Coordinates: 43°55′50.7600″N 123°00′26.20″W
- Interactive map of Hobby Field

Runways
Direction	Length		Surface
Direction	ft	m	Surface
15/33	3,101	945	Asphalt

Hobby Field (FAA LID: 77S), is a public, non-towered airport located one mile (1.6 km) northeast of the city of Creswell in Lane County, Oregon, United States.

The field is approximately 9 miles (14 km) south of Eugene, Oregon.

== Facilities ==
Hobby Field has tie downs for local and transient aircraft, along with self serve 100 LL fuel. There is a small terminal building found near transient parking.
