= Holt International Children's Services =

Adoption agency

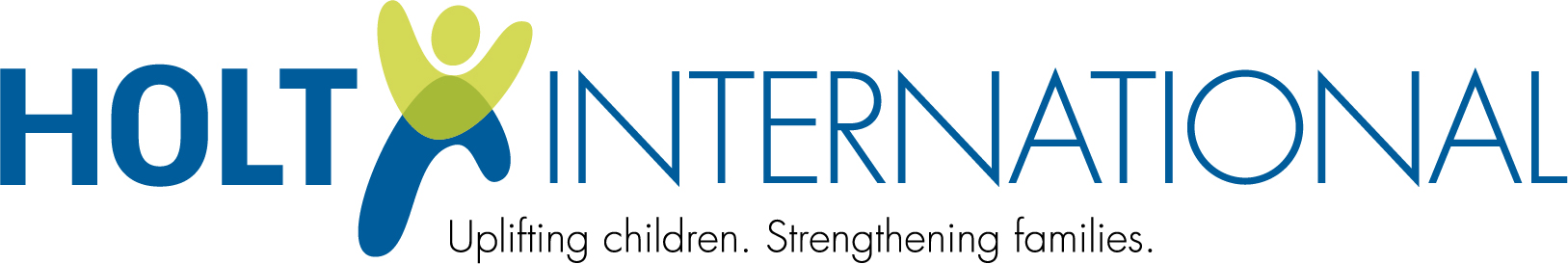
- Purpose: Adoption
- Headquarters: Eugene, Oregon
- Coordinates: 44°03′44.7″N 123°05′12.4″W
- Official language: English
- Interim CEO: Mark Loux
- Website: www.holtinternational.org

Holt International Children's Services (HICS) is a faith-based humanitarian organization and adoption agency based in Eugene, Oregon, United States, known for international adoption and child welfare. The nonprofit works in seventeen countries, including: Bulgaria, Cambodia, China, Colombia, Ethiopia, Haiti, Hong Kong, India, Mongolia, Philippines, South Africa, South Korea, Taiwan, Thailand, Uganda, Vietnam, and the United States. This work includes a range of services for children and families including efforts in nutrition, adoption, education, family strengthening, orphan care, foster care, family reunification, and child sponsorship. The organization's stated mission is to seek a world where every child has a loving and secure home. As of 2026, it is an accredited adoption service provider through the Center for Excellence in Adoption Services (CEAS), listing thirteen office locations in the United States as well as twelve countries for which it provides adoption-related services.

Holt International Children's Services is a separate entity from Holt Children’s Services of Korea, also known as Holt Korea, an adoption agency headquartered in Seoul, South Korea. The two agencies split and became separate entities in 1977, though United States-based Holt International continued to partner with Holt Korea to place Korean children with adoptive families in the United States.

== History ==
In 1954, Harry (1904–1964) and Bertha Holt (1904–2000) were busy raising their six children on a farm near the small Willamette Valley city of Creswell. In addition to farming, Harry ran a lumber company. Bertha, trained as a nurse, was a homemaker and mother.

After seeing a documentary film about "G.I. babies" of the Korean War in orphanages in Korea, the Holts decided they would adopt some of the children who needed families. Harry began preparations to go to Korea, and Bertha asked a friend how to assure that the eight children they intended to adopt from Korea would be able to immigrate to the US and secure US citizenship. Learning that it would be possible only if Congress passed a private law allowing it, Bertha Holt decided to push for such a law.

In August 1955, Congress passed the "Holt Bill," which provided that "Joseph Han Holt, Mary Chae Holt, Helen Chan Holt, Paul Kim Holt, Betty Rhee Holt, and Nathanial Chae Holt shall be held and considered to be the natural-born alien children of Harry and Bertha Holt, citizens of the United States." In October 1955, Harry Holt and eight Korean-born children arrived at Portland International Airport. The resulting publicity stirred interest among many families in the United States. The Holts set about helping others to adopt, leading to the creation of the foundation.

== Controversies ==
In recent years, Korean-born adoptees have accused the South Korean government and Korean-based adoption agencies, including Holt, of illegal activities involving adoptions in the 1970s and 1980s. Peter Moller, an adoptee from Denmark whose adoption was facilitated by Holt Children’s Services of Korea, discovered that his mother was alive and demanded South Korea's Truth and Reconciliation Commission initiate an inquiry into illegal adoptions between the 1960s and 1980s. Adam Crapser, who was adopted into an abusive home in the United States, also brought suit against the Korean government and Holt Children's Services of Korea, alleging that they were negligent in failing to inform his adoptive parents that additional steps were needed to secure Crapser's United States citizenship. Crapser, who was later deported from the United States because he was not a citizen, won a judgment against Holt Korea, but the judgment was later overturned.

An incident involving the death of an Indian-born adoptee Sherin Matthews in Texas in 2017, led to the Indian government's central adoption authority to suspend Holt International's ability to facilitate adoptions from the country.

== Finances ==
Holt International is a 501(c)(3) tax-exempt nonprofit organization with a fiscal year ending September 30. Its revenues are drawn primarily from charitable contributions, which have represented approximately 75 to 81 percent of total annual revenue in recent years, with the remainder derived from program services — principally adoption-related fees — and investment income. Total revenues declined from approximately $31 million in fiscal year 2021 to approximately $25 million in fiscal year 2024. The organization recorded operating deficits in fiscal years 2020, 2022, and 2023, returning to a small surplus of approximately $138,000 in fiscal year 2024.

Selected financial data, fiscal years ending September 30
Fiscal Year	Revenue	Expenses	Net Income	Net Assets
2024	$25,073,985	$24,936,196	$137,789	$16,582,359
2023	$26,687,518	$26,726,941	(▼$39,423)	$15,078,063
2022	$28,100,878	$30,230,057	(▼$2,129,179)	$14,667,171
2021	$31,010,509	$29,102,772	$1,907,737	$18,840,530
2020	$28,752,872	$29,400,295	(▼$647,423)	$15,265,745

== Awards ==
In the year 2000, Bertha Holt was awarded the Kellogg's Child Development Award from the World of Children Award for her work with the Holt International Children's Services.

== See also ==
- International adoption of South Korean children
- Korean adoptee
- Operation Babylift
