= Outline of adoption =

Overview of and topical guide to adoption

The following outline is provided as an overview of and topical guide to adoption:

Adoption – process whereby a person assumes the parenting for another and, in so doing, permanently transfers all rights and responsibilities from the original parent or parents. Adopters assume parenting responsibilities by a legal process.

== Types of adoptions ==
- Adoption fraud – illegally adopting a child, typically with forged paperwork.
- Adult adoption
- Child-buying – the counterpart of child-selling.
- Child laundering (illegal) – illegal acquisition of children through monetary transactions, deceit, and/or force.
- Closed adoption – process by where an infant is adopted by another family, and the record of the biological parent(s) is kept sealed.
- Embryo adoption – third-party reproduction, where a fertilized egg is implanted. The embryo is adopted instead of a child.
- Interracial adoption
- International adoption – International adoption (also referred to as intercountry adoption or transnational adoption) is a type of adoption in which an individual or couple becomes the legal and permanent parents of a child that is a national of a different country. * Interracial adoption – Interracial adoption (also referred to as transracial adoption) refers to the act of placing a child of one racial or ethnic group with adoptive parents of another racial or ethnic group.
- LGBT adoption – LGBT adoption is the adoption of children by lesbian, gay, bisexual and transgender (LGBT) persons.
  - Same-sex adoption in the United Kingdom
- Open adoption – Open adoption is an adoption in which the biological mother or parents and adoptive family know the identity of each other.

== Adoption administration ==
- Adoption disclosure – Adoption disclosure refers to the official release of information relating to the legal adoption of a child.
- Adoption home study – A home study or homestudy is a screening of the home and life of prospective adoptive parents prior to allowing an adoption to take place.
- Adoption reunion registry – An adoption reunion registry is a formal mechanism where adoptees and their birth family members can be reunited.
- Adoption disruption – Disruption is the term most commonly used for ending an adoption.
- Sealed birth records – Sealed birth records, as opposed to open records, refers to the practice of sealing the original birth certificate of an infant upon adoption.

== History of adoption ==
- Adoption in ancient Rome – In ancient Rome, adoption of boys was a fairly common procedure, particularly in the upper senatorial class.
- Baby Scoop Era – period after World War II in which more pregnancies occurred out of wedlock, accompanied by more babies being put up for adoption.
- Fosterage – Fosterage, the practice of a family bringing up a child not their own, differs from adoption in that the child's parents, not the foster-parents, remain the acknowledged parents.
- Forced adoption in Australia – babies were taken from unwed mothers against their will and put up for adoption. A formal open apology was made on behalf of the government to all the victims by Australian Prime Minister Julia Gillard in 2013.
- Home Children – Home Children is a common term used to refer to the child migration scheme founded by Annie MacPherson in 1869, under which more than 100,000 children were sent to Australia, Canada, New Zealand, and South Africa from the United Kingdom.
- List of international adoption scandals

== Law of adoption ==
Adoption law

- Access to Adoption Records Act – The Access to Adoption Records Act (known before passage as Bill 12), is an Ontario (Canada) law passed in 2008 regarding the disclosure of information between parties involved in adoptions.
- Adoption Information Disclosure Act – The Adoption Information Disclosure Act, formally An Act respecting the disclosure of information and records to adopted persons and birth parents, also known as Bill 183, is an Ontario (Canada) law regarding the disclosure of information between parties involved in adoptions.
- Adoption and Safe Families Act – The Adoption and Safe Families Act (ASFA, Public Law 105–89) was signed into law by President Bill Clinton on November 19, 1997, after having been approved by the United States Congress earlier in the month.
- Christian law of adoption in India – Christians in India can adopt children by resort to section 41 of the Juvenile Justice (Care and Protection of Children) Act 2006 read with the Guidelines and Rules issued by various State Governments.
- Foster Care Independence Act – The Foster Care Independence Act of 1999 (Pub.L. 106–169, 113 Stat. 1882, enacted December 14, 1999) aims to assist youth aging out of foster care in obtaining and maintaining independent living skills.
- Hague Adoption Convention – The Hague Convention on Protection of Children and Co-operation in Respect of Intercountry Adoption (or Hague Adoption Convention) is an international convention dealing with international adoption, child laundering, and child trafficking.
- Hindu Adoptions and Maintenance Act (1956) – The Adoptions and Maintenance Act of 1956 dealt specifically with the legal process of adopting children by a Hindu adult, as well as the legal obligations of a Hindu to provide "maintenance" to various family members including, but not limited to, their wife or wives, parents, and in-laws.
- Islamic adoptional jurisprudence – While raising a child who is not one's genetic child is allowed and, in the case of an orphan, even encouraged, the child does not become a child of the "adoptive" parents. It is forbidden by Islamic law to adopt a child (in the common sense of the word). Instead, children retain membership to their original family. this is called in Arabic: kafala.
- Uniform Adoption Act – The Uniform Adoption Act (1994) is a model law (Uniform Act) proposed by the U.S. Uniform Law Commission. It attempts to "be a comprehensive and uniform state adoption code.

=== Adoption laws, by country ===
- Adoption in Australia – Australia allows local adoptions (placement within the country), known child adoptions (adoption by relatives, stepparents or carers), and intercountry adoptions (adoption of children born overseas).
- Adoption in France – Adoption in France is codified in the French Civil Code in two distinct forms: simple adoption and plenary adoption.
- Adoption in Guatemala – From 1996 to 2007, Guatemala was one of the major providers for children for international adoption, peaking at 5,577 children adopted in 2007. Since reforms in 2007–8, aimed at combating extensive corruption in the adoption process, the numbers have fallen drastically.
- Adoption in Italy – As in most jurisdictions, prospective adoptive parents are required to undergo assessment and must show that they will make suitable parents. Italian law requires adopters to be married (or living together) for at least 3 years.
- Adoption in Scotland
- Adoption in the United States – There are both private and public adoption agencies. Private adoption agencies often focus on infant adoptions, while public adoption agencies typically help find homes for waiting children, many of them presently in foster care and in need of a permanent loving home.
  - Adoption in California
  - Adoption in Connecticut

== Adoption and culture ==
- Adoption by celebrities
- Cultural variations in adoption – adoption is a specific legal arrangement within the many kinds of wardship or guardianship or fostering practiced worldwide. While all societies make provision for the rearing of children whose own parents are unavailable to rear them, not all cultures use adoption.
- Adoption reunion registry – An adoption reunion registry is a formal mechanism where adoptees and their birth family members can be reunited.
- National Adoption Day – it is traditional in the U.S. to finalize adoptions on this day. Ceremonies are held around the country in every state of the Union.
- Snowflake children

== Politics of adoption ==
- Adoption tax credit – An adoption tax credit is tax credit offered to adoptive parents to encourage adoption.
- Language of adoption – The language of adoption is changing and evolving, and since the 1970s has been a controversial issue tied closely to adoption reform efforts.

== Sociology of adoption ==
- Adopted child syndrome – Adopted child syndrome is a controversial term that has been used to explain behaviors in adopted children that are claimed to be related to their adoptive status. Specifically, these include problems in bonding, attachment disorders, lying, stealing, defiance of authority, and acts of violence.
- Effects of adoption on the birth mother
- Genealogical bewilderment – term referring to potential identity problems that could be experienced by a child who was either fostered, adopted, or conceived via an assisted reproductive technology procedure such as surrogacy or gamete donation (egg or sperm donation).

== Adoption-related organizations ==
- Adoption Covenant
- Adoption-Friendly Workplace
- American Adoption Congress
- Bastard Nation
- Boys & Girls Aid
- Canadian Council of Natural Mothers
- Catalyst for Social Action
- Center for Adoption Policy
- Children's Aid Society (Ontario)
- China Center of Adoption Affairs
- Concerned United Birthparents
- Congressional Coalition on Adoption Institute
- Dave Thomas Foundation for Adoption
- Family Services
- Friends for All Children
- Gladney Center for Adoption
- Global Overseas Adoptees' Link
- Great Wall China Adoption
- Holt International Children's Services
- Hope and Homes for Children
- Joint Council on International Children's Services
- Maine Children's Home for Little Wanderers
- National Florence Crittenton Mission
- Nightlight Christian Adoptions
- Origins Canada
- Protestant Home for Babies
- Raise A Child Inc.
- South Carolina Heart Gallery
- The Adolescent and Children's Trust
- Vietnam Friendship Village
- Zoé's Ark

== Adoption-related publications ==
- Adoption & Fostering

== See also ==
- Child protection
- Orphan
- Orphanage
- Ward (law)
