= Law of adoption =

Law of adoption may refer to

- Adoption
- Adoption law
- Law of adoption (Mormonism)
- Christian law of adoption in India
- LGBT adoption (section Summary of laws by jurisdiction)
- LGBT adoption and parenting in Australia
- LGBT adoption in the United States
- LGBT rights in the United States (section State adoption laws)
- International adoption (section International adoption laws)
- Adoption Information Disclosure Act
- Adoption and Safe Families Act US 1997
- China Center of Adoption Affairs
- Uniform Adoption Act US 1994
- Adoption in Australia (section State laws)
- Adoption in California (section California adoption law)
- Adoption in Guatemala
