= Shrublands (house) =

Heritage-listed former mansion in Melbourne, Victoria, Australia

- Location of the mansion in Greater Metropolitan Melbourne
- Former names: St John's Home; St John's Homes for Boys and Girls; anor

General information
- Status: Completed
- Type: Mansion (1863–1924); Orphanage (1924–1997); House (since 2002– )
- Architectural style: Victorian Italianate
- Location: 16 Balwyn Road, Canterbury, City of Boroondara, Melbourne, Victoria, Australia
- Coordinates: 37°49′17″S 145°04′48″E
- Completed: 1863; 163 years ago
- Renovated: 1889; 1934; 1950s; 2002
- Owner: Ernest Carter (1863–1883); Hindson family (1883–1923); CoE / Anglicare (1923–2002); Private residence (since 2002– )

Technical details
- Material: Bricks; stucco; bluestone
- Floor count: 2
- Grounds: 24 ha (60 acres) (1863); 3 ha (8 acres) (1883); 6,525 m^{2} (70,230 sq ft) (2023)

Design and construction
- Architects: John Flannagan (1863); William G. Wolf (1889)

Victorian Heritage Register
- Official name: Shrublands
- Type: Registered place
- Designated: 11 September 2003
- Reference no.: VHR H2037
- Heritage overlay no.: HO258
- Categories: Residential buildings (private); Community Facilities

Register of the National Estate
- Official name: Shrublands
- Type: Defunct register
- Designated: 21 March 1978
- Reference no.: 5634

Shrublands, known as St John's Home between 1924 and 1997, is a former mansion, a former orphanage, and now expansive house, located at 16 Balwyn Road in Canterbury, in the City of Boroondara, in the inner eastern suburbs of Melbourne, in Victoria, Australia.

Built from 1863 on the traditional lands of the Wurundjeri people, the former mansion was added to the Victorian Heritage Register on 11 September 2003 in recognition of its historical and architectural significance; and was also added to the non-statutory and now defunct Register of the National Estate on 21 March 1978.

== History ==
=== Mansion ===
Set on a 24-hectare (60-acre) estate, Shrublands was designed by Melbourne architect John Flannagan, for Ernest Carter, a dentist and later vigneron. Carter produced "Shrublands" labelled wine in 1860s and 1870s when the Boroondara area was one of Victoria's leading wine growing regions. In 1883, Carter subdivided the estate and sold the mansion, Shrublands, set on three hectares (eight acres) to John Hindson, a stockbroker, and his wife, Alice.

=== Church of England orphanage ===
In 1923, Alice Hindson donated Shrublands to the Church of England, with the condition that the building bear the name of Saint John the Evangelist. In November 1924, the former mansion was converted into an orphanage, called St John's Home for Boys; and from 1958, the home changed its name to St John’s Homes for Boys and Girls; later, simply as St John's Home. The home initially accommodated boys aged between 5 and 14 years. In 1926, timber buildings from the St Martin's Home for Boys, located in Auburn, were transferred to the Canterbury site, and were later known as the Kimpton Buildings. The two homes were sometimes referred to as the ‘Church of England Homes for Boys’. Older boys were housed at St Martin’s, and younger boys at St John’s. The combined homes were opened officially in 1926 by the Governor of Victoria, Lord Somers.

During the Great Depression, demand for the Home grew and the Church acquired a neighbouring property and built more facilities to accommodate boys. From 1949 and into the 1950s, St John’s Home was one of the institutions in Victoria to receive child migrants from post-WWII Britain. During the 1950s, facilities were expanded to include a hostel for senior boys, some of whom obtained work following the completion of their schooling, aged 15 years, and were required to pay a portion of their earnings as rent.

In the 1950s, the model of care changed from dormitory-style to cottages in a congregate care model, with groups of eight to ten boys, under the guidance of a married couple, as a house father and house mother. This change also led to the introduction of girls into the facility and later, as a place of transition into or from foster care. In 1975, Princess Margaret visited the Home and, from 1979, a preschool was established on the site. By 1997, Anglicare had been operating the Home, and inline with dinstitutionalisation practices in Australia, the orphanage was closed; and the property sold in 2002.

=== Contemporary residence ===
The Williams family, were the owners from 2002, who extensively renovated the former mansion, that had fallen into disrepair. In April 2021, Shrublands was purchased by Alan Ali, also known as Ali Ali, a property developer, for A$29 million.

The house was listed for sale in 2021 and again in 2023 and 2024, including a neighbouring house, with expectations of A$40–49 million; and again in 2025.

== Description ==
The original part of the house, completed in 1863, is a two-storey brick and stucco Victorian Italianate style mansion. The building's form is asymmetrical with a wrap around two-storey arcaded loggia finishing in a faceted bay window end. The original body of the house sits over a bluestone cellar. A substantial two-storey extension to the western side was added in 1889, designed by another Melbourne architect, William G. Wolf. This addition is sympathetic to Flannagan's design incorporating Tuscan and Ionic pilasters to match those on the loggia. A further two-storey extension was added in 1934 that matches the older sections in proportion if not stylistically.

A number of large trees – including a Bunya Bunya (Araucaria bidwillii) and Himalayan Cedar (Cedrus deodar) – from the original estate are extant and others are evident amongst the surrounding properties.

As of 2023, the extensively-renovated former mansion had 42 rooms including ten bedrooms and eleven bathrooms, an indoor swimming pool, six-car garage, commercial-grade kitchen, powder rooms, a gymnasium and massage room, a costume room, workshop, laundry, a boardroom and reception area, concrete-formed balconies and terraces, multiple ornate fireplaces, a tennis court, terraced gardens, and other modern amenities, and was set on 6,525 square metres (70,230 sq ft).

== See also ==
- Architecture of Melbourne
- Deinstitutionalisation (orphanages and children's institutions)
- Forgotten Australians
- Foster care in Australia
- Home Children
- List of places on the Victorian Heritage Register in the City of Boroondara
