= National Adoption Day =

Day on which adoptions are finalized in the U.S.

On National Adoption Day courts and communities in the United States come together to finalize thousands of adoption of children from foster care. More than 300 events are held each year on the Saturday before Thanksgiving in November, in all 50 US states, the District of Columbia and Puerto Rico to finalize the adoptions of children in foster care. In total, more than 40,000 children have been adopted from foster care on National Adoption Day.

== History ==
National Adoption Day was started in 2000 by a coalition of national partners, which included The Alliance for Children's Rights, Children's Action Network, Freddie Mac Foundation and Dave Thomas Foundation for Adoption, and children's rights lawyer and former foster child Andrew Bridge.

In November 2000, National Adoption Day sponsors worked with law firms, state foster care agencies, child advocates, and courts to complete hundreds of foster care adoptions in nine jurisdictions nationwide. In November 2001, 17 jurisdictions participated in National Adoption Day. In 2002, Casey Family Services and the Congressional Coalition on Adoption Institute joined the National Adoption Day Coalition, helping 34 cities across the country finalize 1,350 adoptions and celebrate adoption.

By 2003, courts and community organizations in more than 120 jurisdictions coast to coast finalized the adoptions of 3,100 children and celebrated adoption. In 2004, courts and community organizations finalized the adoptions of more than 3,400 children from foster care in 200 events in 37 states.

In 2011, National Adoption Day was celebrated across the U.S., the District of Columbia and Puerto Rico as more than 300 events were held throughout the country to finalize the adoptions of children in foster care, and to celebrate all families who adopt. In total, more than 75,000 children have been adopted from foster care on National Adoption Day. Traditionally, National Adoption Day is celebrated the Saturday before Thanksgiving.

== Partners ==
National Adoption Day is supported by a coalition of non-profit partners:

- The Alliance for Children's Rights
- Andrew Bridge
- Children's Action Network
- Congressional Coalition on Adoption Institute
- Dave Thomas Foundation for Adoption
- Freddie Mac Foundation
