= Andrew Bridge =

Andrew Bridge may refer to:

- Andrew Bridge (lighting designer), American theatre lighting designer
- Andrew Bridge (basketball) (born 1979), British basketball player
- Andrew Bridge (lawyer), American author and lawyer
