= 1980s–1990s Romanian orphans phenomenon =

Orphans from Romania

Orphanhood in Romania became prevalent as a consequence of the Socialist Republic of Romania's natalist policy under Nicolae Ceaușescu. Its effectiveness led to an increase in birth rates at the expense of adequate family planning and reproductive rights. Its consequences were most felt with the collapse of the regime's social safety net during the 1980s Romanian austerity period, which led to widespread institutional neglect of the needs of orphans, with severe consequences in their health, including high rates of HIV infection in children, and well-being. A series of international and governmental interventions have taken place since the 1990s to improve the conditions in orphanages and reform the country's child protection system.

== Background ==
=== Natalist policy ===
Under Nicolae Ceaușescu, both abortion and contraception were forbidden. Ceaușescu believed that population growth would lead to economic growth. In October 1966, Decree 770 was enacted, which banned abortion except in cases in which the mother was over forty years of age or already had four children in care. Birth rates especially rose during the years of 1967, 1968 and 1969. By 1977, people were taxed for being childless.

Children born in these years are popularly known as decreței, from the diminutive of the Romanian word "decret", meaning "decree". This increase in the number of births resulted in many children being abandoned in orphanages, which were also occupied by people with disabilities and mental illnesses. Together, these vulnerable groups were subjected to institutionalised neglect, physical and sexual abuse, and drug use to control behaviour.

The U.S. Consul in Bucharest from 1987 to 1991, Virginia Carson Young, noted that many of the children were not actually orphans, but were in fact children who had parents unable to afford such large families, a situation created by the mandated natalist requirements. The parents had placed them in orphanages, often with the intention of picking them up at an older age.

== Conditions in orphanages ==
The conditions in orphanages had declined after 1982, as a result of Ceauşescu's decision to seize much of the country's economic output in order to repay its foreign debt. Due to the economic downturn, electricity and heat in orphanages were often intermittent and food was scarce.

Though conditions in orphanages were not uniform, the worst conditions were mostly found in institutions for disabled children. One such example, the Siret children's psychiatric hospital, lacked both medicines and washing facilities, and physical and sexual abuse of children was reported to be common. In another case, the Sighetu Marmației institution for disabled children, the children were often tied to their own beds or dangerously restrained in their own clothing.

Because the staff had failed to put clothes on them, the children would spend their day naked and be left sitting in their own feces and urine. Nurses who worked at the institutions were not properly trained, and often abused the children. Dirty water was used for baths, and the children were thrown in three at a time by the staff. Due to the abuse children received from staff, older children learned to beat the younger ones. All children, including girls, had their heads shaved, which made it difficult to differentiate one another. Many had delayed cognitive development, and many did not know how to feed themselves.

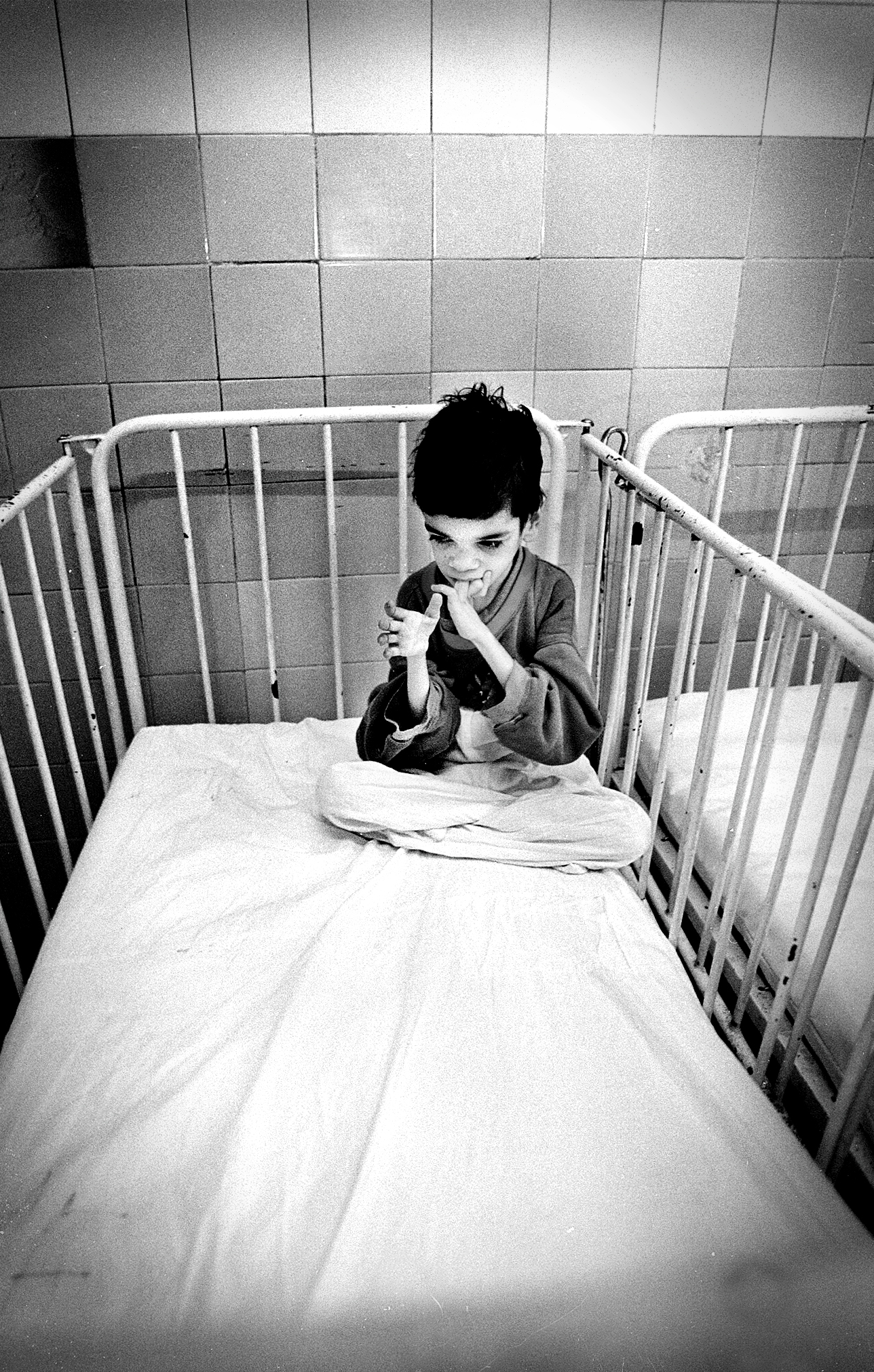
Severely malnourished 13-year-old displaying self-stimulating behaviour.

Physical needs were not met, as many children died of minor illness or injuries such as cataracts or anaemia. Many starved to death. Physical injuries that had to do with development included fractures that had not healed correctly, resulting in deformed limbs.

Some children in the orphanages were infected with HIV/AIDS due to the practice of using unsterilised instruments. Orphanages failed to meet even the most basic needs of the children. In addition to the distress of living in an orphanage, children faced further displacement when they were moved from one orphanage to another without being told in advance. Usually, they had to change institutions first when they reached three years of age, and again when they reached six years of age. The harshest fate was reserved to children deemed as "irrecuperable" who were considered "unproductive" and assigned to the Labour Ministry. After the fall of the regime, former staff claimed corporal punishment of all children was encouraged as "appropriate discipline", and that staff who did not beat the children were considered weak.

== Number of children in orphanages ==
The true number of children who lived in orphanages during the communist era is not known, due to the fact that it is not possible to obtain reliable data on practices and policies that took place under the regime. According to some sources, in 1989 there were approximately 100,000 children living in orphanages. Other sources put the figure at 170,000. Overall, it is estimated that about 500,000 children were raised in orphanages.

== Street children in the 1990s ==
After the December 1989 Romanian Revolution, an initial period of economic and social insecurity followed. The 1990s was a difficult transition period, and it is during this period that the number of street children was very high. Some ran away or were thrown out of orphanages or abusive homes, and were often seen begging, inhaling 'aurolac' from sniffing bags, and roaming around the Bucharest Metro. This situation was presented in a 2001 documentary called Children Underground, which depicted the life of Romanian street children.

== Abuses related to international adoption ==
After the fall of the communist regime, after the conditions in the orphanages were made public, adoption was promoted as a solution. As a result, large numbers of children were adopted by foreigners in the 1990s and early 2000s. Nevertheless, there were many irregularities, fueled by corruption and loose regulations. As a result, in 2004, the government banned international adoption, except by grandparents. The ban was passed under pressure from the EU, which Romania later joined in January 2007, in order to curb the abuses of the system.

== Improvements ==
An English girl helping in an orphanage near Iași

As the realities of life in Romanian orphanages emerged after December 1989, the reaction outside Romania was of shock at the plight of the orphans, and numerous charities were established. Numerous fund-raising activities have been conducted by various parties, such as the 1990 album Nobody's Child: Romanian Angel Appeal, which was compiled by George and Olivia Harrison for AIDS-infected orphans. Along with fund-raisers, Westerners and Europeans adopted many Romanian children after the exploitation of their conditions. However, strict laws prevented many adoptions and the process of adoption became complex.

In September 2005, Emma Nicholson, Baroness Nicholson of Winterbourne, the European Parliament's rapporteur for Romania, stated "Romania has profoundly reformed [from top to bottom] its child protection system and has evolved from one of the worst systems in Europe to one of the best."

Improving the situation of orphans had been made a condition of Romanian entry into the European Union, but an investigation by BBC journalist Chris Rogers in 2009 revealed that conditions in some institutions are still very poor and large numbers of institutionalized and traumatized people are still held in inadequate conditions, with many apparently having entered the system post-Ceauşescu. The institutions housed adults at this time, who did not get adequate medical attention as they suffered injuries and physical problems due to improper care. In early 2011, two British charities Hope and Homes for Children and ARK launched a plan to complete the reform of the Romanian Child Protection Systems and close all large children's homes in Romania by 2020.

== Effects on children ==
Because of the neglect the children suffered, many grew up with physical and mental delays. Children with obvious mental delays or disorders were given false diagnoses from untrained nurses or doctors. According to Jon Hamilton, "A lot of what scientists know about parental bonding and the brain comes from studies of children who spent time in Romanian orphanages during the 1980s and 1990s." The conditions of the orphanages showed that not only is nutrition vital to a child's development, but also basic human contact.

Due to lack of human contact, babies developed without stimulation, which led to self stimulation such as hand flapping or rocking back and forth. With these characteristics, children were often misdiagnosed to have mental disabilities and forced to move to another institution. They were also given psychiatric medication to treat their behaviors, or they were tied to their beds to prevent self-harm.

Even after being adopted, children had problems forming attachments to their new parents. When testing the children's responses in comparison to other children, scientists monitored their brain responses to seeing their adoptive mothers or an unfamiliar woman. The results, according to scientist Nim Tottenham, state, "The amygdala signal was not discriminating Mom from strangers." According to other MRI studies, children who grew up in Romanian orphanages had physically smaller brains than average children who developed properly.

According to attachment theory, "The most important tenet of attachment theory is that an infant needs to develop a relationship with at least one primary caregiver for the child's successful social and emotional development, and in particular for learning how to effectively regulate their feelings." In the Romanian orphanages, children had grown accustomed to neglect in early infancy. Because of the struggle to form emotional attachment to others, such as adoptive parents, children had trouble adapting to their new lives after being adopted.

Additionally to physical effects, the legal attributes of being disowned include a loss of legal surname, in addition to first names being assigned as numbers. Young children brought to orphanages typically cannot remember their names and because of this are named by their caretakers.

== Statistics ==
Number of children in the care of the state between 1997 and 2022:

#	year	Total children in care of the state	Number living in orphanages
1.	1997	51,468	39,569
2.	1998	55,641	38,597
3.	1999	57,087	33,356
4.	2000	87,753	57,181
5.	2001	87,889	57,060
6.	2002	87,867	49,965
7.	2003	86,379	43,092
8.	2004	84,445	37,660
9.	2005	83,059	32,821
10.	2006	78,766	28,786
11.	2007	73,793	26,599
12.	2008	71,047	24,979
13.	2009	68,858	24,227
14.	2010	64,878	23,103
15.	2011	63,689	23,240
16.	2012	60,687	22,798
17.	2013	60,078	22,189
18.	2014	58,178	21,540
19.	2015	57,279	20,291
20.	2016	56,866	19,369
21.	2017	55,302	18,197
22.	2018	52,783	17,096
23.	2019	50,401	15,572
24.	2020	48,031	13,961
25.	2021	45,212	12,890
26.	2022	42,029	11,629
