= Canadian Council of Natural Mothers =

Canadian lobby group

The Canadian Council of Natural Mothers (CCNM) is a Canadian lobby group for the rights of women who have placed children for adoption, founded in 1999. It is opposed to most continuing adoption practices, arguing that adoption is traumatic for mothers and frequently does not benefit their children as currently practised. To support mothers, CCNM maintains an active email group which discusses issues which pertain to those who have experienced adoption loss and those who may be in reunion with lost family members. Members of the CCNM also at attend adoption related conferences, government meetings and meetings with social services agencies to educate people about the experiences of natural mothers and argue for improved policies, practices and rights of mothers and adopted people.

Many of CCNM's published positions argue that adoption is frequently dependent on the legal and emotional exploitation of natural mothers, and the group has published a guide to "Honest Adoption Language" which argues that much of the contemporary vocabulary used to describe adoption exhibits a pro-adoption bias.

CCNM has been very influential in opening birth records. Its then Vice-President, Sandra Jarvie, represented mothers and people adopted in working to open records in Alberta. The records opened in Alberta in 2004. In Ontario, CCNM supported the Adoption Information Disclosure Act and the Access to Adoption Records Act. In 2005 it published a position paper disputing the claims of Ontario Privacy Commissioner Ann Cavoukian with regard to past privacy commitments made to women placing children for adoption. CCNM also worked closely with the Coalition for Open Adoption Records (COAR) in Ontario to open Ontario's records, which occurred on 1 June 2009.

Membership is open to all mothers who have placed children for adoption, their children and other natural family members. Others who support the aims of the organization may also join. The current president of CCNM is Karen Lynn. CCNM is an affiliate of Parent Finders Canada.

== See also ==
- Bastard Nation
- Concerned United Birthparents
