= Language of adoption =

The language of adoption is changing and evolving, and since the 1970s has been a controversial issue tied closely to adoption reform efforts. The controversy arises over the use of terms which, while designed to be more appealing or less offensive to some persons affected by adoption, may simultaneously cause offense or insult to others. This controversy illustrates the problems in adoption, as well as the fact that coining new words and phrases to describe ancient social practices will not necessarily alter the feelings and experiences of those affected by them. Two of the contrasting sets of terms are commonly referred to as positive adoption language (PAL) (sometimes referred to as respectful adoption language (RAL)), and honest adoption language (HAL).

== Positive adoption language ==
In the 1970s, as adoption search and support organizations developed, there were challenges to the language in common use at the time. The term "natural mother" had been in common use previously. The term "birth mother" was first used in 1956 by Nobel Prize winning author and adoptive mother Pearl S. Buck. As books like Adoption Triangle by Sorosky, Pannor and Baran were published, and support groups formed like CUB (Concerned United Birthparents), a major shift from natural parent to birthparent occurred. Along with the change in times and social attitudes came additional examination of the language used in adoption.

Social workers and other professionals in the field of adoption began changing terms of use to reflect what was being expressed by the parties involved. In 1979, Marietta Spencer wrote "The Terminology of Adoption" for the Child Welfare League of America (CWLA), which was the basis for her later work "Constructive Adoption Terminology". This influenced Pat Johnston's "positive adoption language" (PAL) and "respectful adoption language" (RAL). The terms contained in "positive adoption language" include the terms "birth mother" (to replace the terms "natural mother" and "real mother"), "placing" (to replace the term "surrender").

Language, at its best, honors the self-referencing choices of the persons involved, utilizes inclusive terms and phrases, and is sensitive to the feelings of the primary parties. Language evolves with social attitudes and experiences. The example below is one of the earliest and these lists, too, have evolved and changed some over the years.

The reasons for its use: Some terms like birth parents, birth mother, birth father were chosen by those working in adoption reform as terms to replace 'natural' and it took nearly a decade before agencies, social workers, courts and laws embraced the change in self-referencing. Some adoptive parents supported this change as they felt using "natural" indicated they were "unnatural". In some cultures, adoptive families face an anti-adoption bias. This can be evident in English-speaking cultures when there is prominent use of negative or inaccurate language describing adoption. So, to combat it, many adoptive families choose the use of positive adoption language.

The reasons against its use: Some adoptees believe "positive adoption language" creates cognitive dissonance, denies certain realities for the adoptee, and treats the status of being an adopted person as if it is something to be ashamed of by insisting adoption should not be part of their identity. Some birth parents see "positive adoption language" as terminology which glosses over painful facts they face as they go into the indefinite post-adoption period of their lives. They feel PAL has become a way to present adoption in the friendliest light possible, in order to obtain even more infants for adoption; i.e., a sales and marketing tool. Some feel the social work system has negatively compromised the intention of the birth family references and other terms, so that either the initial intent needs to be honored, or the terminology must again change.

=== Example of terms used in positive adoption language ===
Non-preferred:	PAL term:	Reasons stated for preference:
your own child	birth child; biological child	Saying a birth child is your own child or one of your own children implies that an adopted child is not.
child is adopted	child was adopted	Some adoptees believe that their adoption is not their identity, but is an event that happened to them. ("Adopted" becomes a participle rather than an adjective.) Others contend that "is adopted" makes adoption sound like an ongoing disability, rather than a past event.
give up for adoption	place for adoption or make an adoption plan	"Give up" implies a lack of value. The preferred terms are more emotionally neutral.
real mother/father/parent	birth, biological or genetic mother/father/parent	The use of the term "real" implies that the adoptive family is artificial, and is not as descriptive.
natural parent	birth parent or first parent	The use of the term "natural" implies that the adoptive family is unnatural, and so is not a descriptive or accurate term. Although it can be seen as unnatural to conceive and relinquish children, the purpose is to present the adoption of those children in need as natural. The term "natural" in its origin means a family by the natural means of conception and birth and its primal bond which exists by itself since the beginning unless it is severed.
your adopted child	your child	The use of the adjective "adopted" signals that the relationship is qualitatively different from that of parents to birth children.
surrender for adoption	placed or placed for adoption	The use of the adjective "surrendered" implies "giving up". For many parents placing a child for adoption is an informed completely voluntary choice. For others, there is no choice as the parent's rights were terminated because the parent was deemed to be unfit.

== Honest adoption language ==
"Honest adoption language" refers to a set of terms that reflect the point of view that: (1) family relationships (social, emotional, psychological or physical) that existed prior to the legal adoption continue, and that (2) mothers who have "voluntarily surrendered" children to adoption (as opposed to involuntary terminations through court-authorized child-welfare proceedings) seldom view it as a choice that was freely made, but instead describe scenarios of powerlessness, lack of resources, and overall lack of choice. It also reflects the point of view that the term "birth mother" is derogatory in implying that the woman has ceased being a mother after the physical act of giving birth. Proponents of HAL liken this to the mother being treated as a "breeder" or "incubator". Terms included in HAL include the original terms that were used before PAL, including "natural mother", "Mother" and "surrendered for adoption", "own child" rather than "birth child" etc. The organization Origins Canada has been a pioneer in promoting honest adoption language

The reasons for its use: In most cultures, the adoption of a child does not change the identities of its mother and father: they continue to be referred to as such. Those who adopted a child were thereafter termed its "guardians", "foster", or "adoptive" parents. Some people choose to use "honest adoption language" (HAL) because it reflects the original terminology. Some of those directly affected by adoption separation believe these terms more accurately reflect important but hidden and/or ignored realities of adoption. They feel this language also reflects continuing connection and does not exclude further contact.

The reasons against its use: The term "honest" implies that all other language used in adoption is dishonest. HAL does not honor the historical aspects of the early adoption reform movement who requested and worked years to have terminology changed from natural to birth. Some adoptive parents feel disrespected by language like 'natural parent' because it can indicate they are unnatural.

=== Example of terms used in honest adoption language ===
Non-preferred:	HAL Term:	Reasons stated for preference:
birth mother/father/parent	mother or natural mother	HAL views term "birth mother" as being derogatory, limiting a woman's purpose in her child's life to the physical act of reproduction and thus implying that she is a "former mother" or "breeder". HAL terms reflect the point of view that there is a continuing mother-child relationship and/or bond that endures despite separation
birth child	natural child, child of one's own	HAL views the term "birth child" as being derogatory, implying that the adoptee was a "birth product" produced for the adoption market, and having no relationship or connection with his or her natural mother past the event of having been born. It also implies that the mother is a "birth mother" with no connection to her child or interest in her child past this point
place for adoption give up for adoption	surrender for adoption (have) (are) separated by adoption,	HAL acknowledges that past adoption practice facilitated the taking of children for adoption, often against their mother's expressed wishes. Many women who have gone through the process and who are separated from their children by adoption believe that social work techniques used to prepare single mothers to sign Termination Of Parental Rights papers closely resembles a psychological war against natural motherhood; hence the term "surrender". "Surrender" is also the legal term for the mother's signing a Termination of Parental Rights. "Realistic Plan", "Make a plan" and "place for adoption" are viewed by HAL proponents as being dishonest terms which marginalize or deny the wrenching emotional effect of separation on the mother/child dyad. and imply the mother has made a fully informed decision.
mother/father/parent (when referring solely to the parents who had adopted)	adoptive mother/father/parent/adopter	Referring to the people who have adopted the child as the mother or father (singular) ignores the emotional and psychological (and often physical) presence of a second set of parents in the child's life. In contrast to RAL, HAL reflects the opinion that there are two sets of parents in the adopted person's life: adoptive parents and natural parents.
adopted child	adopted person or person who was adopted	The use of the adjective 'adopted' signals that the relationship is qualitatively different from that of parents to other children. The use of the word "child" is accurate up until the end of childhood. After that the continued use of "child" is infantilizing.

== Inclusive adoption language ==
There are supporters of various lists, developed over many decades, and there are persons who find them lacking, created to support an agenda, or furthering division. All terminology can be used to demean or diminish, uplift or embrace. In addressing the linguistic problem of naming, Edna Andrews says that using "inclusive" and "neutral" language is based upon the concept that "language represents thought, and may even control thought."

Advocates of inclusive language defend it as inoffensive-language usage whose goal is multi-fold:

1. The rights, opportunities, and freedoms of certain people are restricted because they are reduced to stereotypes.
2. Stereotyping is mostly implicit, unconscious, and facilitated by the availability of pejorative labels and terms.
3. Rendering the labels and terms socially unacceptable, people then must consciously think about how they describe someone unlike themselves.
4. When labeling is a conscious activity, the described person's individual merits become apparent, rather than his or her stereotype.

A common problem is that terms chosen by an identity group, as acceptable descriptors of themselves, can be then used in negative ways by detractors. This compromises the integrity of the language and turns what was intended to be positive into negative or vice versa, thus often devaluing acceptability, meaning and use.

In this evolving debate about which terms are acceptable in any era, there can be disagreements within the group itself. To be inclusive requires that no group ascribes to others what they must call themselves. Words and phrases must reflect mutual respect and honor the individual choice.

Inclusive adoption language is far more than an aesthetic matter of identity imagery that one embraces or rejects; it can focus the fundamental issues and ideals of social justice. Language that is truly inclusive affirms the humanity of all the people involved, and shows respect for difference. Words have the power to communicate hospitality or hostility, to exploit and exclude, as well as affirm and liberate. Inclusive language honors that each individual has a right to determine for themselves what self-referencing term is comfortable and best reflects their personal identity.

== See also ==
- Adoption in the United States
- Baby scoop era
- Bastard Nation
- Illegitimacy
- International adoption
