= Child Rescue Nepal =

UK registered charity

Child Rescue Nepal (CRN)
- Industry: Child rights
- Founded: 1999
- Founder: Philip Holmes; In memory of Esther, his first wife
- Headquarters: Beulah Family Church, Beulah Crescent London, CR7 8JL. 0207 183 0353
- Area served: Nepal
- Key people: Joanna Bega, Chief Executive
- Revenue: 430,421 pound sterling (2020)
- Number of employees: 3 (2024)
- Website: childrescuenepal.org

The Child Rescue Nepal (formerly Esther Benjamins Trust) is a UK registered charity that promotes children's rights in Nepal. As a result of the work of this trust, it is now illegal to imprison Nepali children alongside their parents or for them to work in Indian circuses. It has recently become one of the pioneers of deinstitutionalisation in Nepal.

In October 2025 the announced they had saved their 1000th child.

== Initiatives ==
=== Prison Children Project ===
In 2002, the charity's first projects in Nepal involved the rescue of innocent children from prison; these were children who had been jailed alongside parents upon whom they were dependent and in the absence of any family members who were willing to look after them. The children were rescued with the agreement of the parents and looked after in community-based refuges where they could attend school and associate freely with their peers.

The story made several headlines, and in November 2001 the Nepal government outlawed the jailing of innocent children. Although it still happened on a small scale, having highlighted the issue and brought the numbers down, a number of local NGOs were able to manage the vastly reduced number of children.

=== Circus Children Project ===
In 2002, one of the trust's Nepali partners heard about the trafficking of children from Nepal into Indian circuses where they were ostensibly employed as performers. The reality – as revealed by research commissioned by the Trust in 2002 – was slavery and extremes of abuse inside circuses that existed as de facto prisons. In conjunction with the Indian and Nepalese authorities, the Trust launched a rescue program for the children with great success, and a child trafficking route was closed. The program was instrumental in the release of around 700 children and young people, half of whom were freed by circus raids and the other half released by the circuses to avoid adverse publicity. The Trust's co-workers in Nepal tracked down the traffickers and 20 of them were imprisoned.

In 2006, a Nepalese court first recognized the Indian circus as being a potential trafficking destination and this set a legal precedent. In April 2011 the Indian Supreme Court ruled that performers inside circuses could not be under 18.

=== Disability projects ===
The Trust has also supported the School for Deaf Children in Bhairahawa and the Disabled Day Care Centre in Butwal. When the Trust started working with the school for deaf children it only offered a primary education, it now offers School Leaving Certificate. Just six deaf schools operate across Nepal but the trust has built new classrooms, extended the hostel for boarders, employed the first deaf teacher, and funded a number of scholarships. The Trust supported the development of the disabled day care centre, installed play equipment and sent physiotherapy volunteers.

=== Deinstitutionalisation ===
The children freed from the jails, the circuses (and from a smaller street children project who could not be immediately reunited with their families) were originally housed in a small community home. Gradually this grew into something of an institution. The trust is one of the first charities in Nepal working through the programme of deinstitutionalisation to support families to improve their own circumstances so that they can be reunited with their children without the children being at risk of further trafficking. The trust have now completed the closure of the large home, many children have been reunited with strengthened families with the remainder housed in three small, family-like homes.
