= UAA =

UAA may refer to:

== Education ==
- Universidad Adventista de las Antillas, a private university in Mayaguez, Puerto Rico, part of the Seventh-day Adventist education system
- Universidad Autónoma de Aguascalientes, a public university in Aguascalientes, Mexico
- University of Alaska Anchorage, a public university in Anchorage, Alaska, USA, part of the University of Alaska system
- University of Alberta Augustana Faculty, a faculty of the University of Alberta located in Camrose, Alberta, Canada
- University Athletic Association, an athletic conference of US private university sports teams
- Üsküdar American Academy, a private coeducational high school in Istanbul, Turkey

== Science ==
- UAA ("ochre"), a genetic stop codon

== Technology ==
- Universal Audio Architecture, an initiative to standardize audio devices in Microsoft Windows
- Universally Administered Address, a type of MAC address

== Arts ==
- United Arts Agency, an arts collective located in California, USA
- Universal Academy of the Arts - Dance and Musical Theatre School, UK

== Other uses ==
- Under Armour (NYSE Class A ticker UAA)
- Uniform Adoption Act, a proposed model law in USA
- United Artists Associated, a former distributor of theatrical feature films and short subjects for television
- University Air Squadron, RAF training unit
- United Assassins Association, fictional organization from the video game series No More Heroes (series)
- Uyghur American Association
