= Adoption disclosure =

Adoption disclosure refers to the official release of information relating to the legal adoption of a child. Throughout much of the 20th century, many Western countries had legislation intended to prevent adoptees and adoptive families from knowing the identities of birth parents and vice versa. After a decline in the social stigma surrounding adoption, many Western countries changed laws to allow for the release of formerly secret birth information, usually with limitations.

== History ==
Though adoption is an ancient practice, the notion of formal laws intended to solidify the adoption by restricting information exchange is comparatively young. In most Western countries until the 1960s and 1970s, adoption bore with it a certain stigma as it was associated in the popular mind with illegitimacy, orphanhood, and premarital or extramarital sex. Unmarried pregnant women were often sent elsewhere from the latter stages of pregnancy until birth, with the intent of concealing the pregnancy from family and neighbours.

The passage of legislation which solidified the secrecy of adoption for both parties was regarded as a social good: it attempted to ensure the shame associated with adoption was a one-time event and prevent disputes over the child. The legislation was also influenced by prevailing psychological beliefs in social determinism: believers in social determinism felt that adoptees' origins and genetics were irrelevant to their future except perhaps for medical purposes.

Many instances of such legislation did allow for "non-identifying information", generalized background information about birth parents collected by adoption workers, which by deliberate design did not identify them.

== Responses to secrecy provisions ==
As many adoptees and birth families were curious about one another, various attempts were made to work around these provisions. Two common approaches were contributing to passive registries and initiating active searches.

=== Passive registry ===
A passive registry or adoption reunion registry is a double-blind list, in which participants may opt to join. If Alice joins and specifies she is interested in meeting Bob, one of two things may happen. If Bob has already joined and indicated he wishes to meet Alice, contact between them is arranged. Otherwise, Alice simply waits on the list until Bob should decide to join. Many adoption reunion registries have been created since the 1950s, from those that are part of adoption search and support group membership services, to internet registries and state sponsored registries. The oldest and largest independent registry is ISRR - the International Soundex Reunion Registry, Inc. founded in 1975.

=== Active searches ===
An active search is a conscious effort to find a birth family member or adoptee with whatever knowledge is available.

== Types of disclosure ==
A typical problem with disclosure is balancing the desire for information with the promises, explicit or implicit, that have been made to parties in the past.

=== Disclosure veto ===
With a disclosure veto, the government announces that Bob's name will be available to Alice upon her request after a certain date. If Bob does not want contact from Alice, he may issue a written veto before this date elapses. If he does not do this, his name will be released upon Alice's request.

=== Contact veto ===
With a contact veto, Bob has no means of preventing Alice from learning his name upon her request. However, he can issue a veto of sorts preventing her from attempting to contact him after she learns his name.

== See also ==
- Closed adoption
- Adoption Information Disclosure Act
- American Adoption Congress AAC
- Bastard Nation
- Adoption Disclosure Register (Ontario)
- International Soundex Reunion Registry ISRR
