= Adoption 2002 =

Project to increase child adoption in the United States by Bill Clinton

The Adoption 2002 Initiative was a program instituted in the United States during the late 1990s by the Clinton Administration. Based on the Adoption and Safe Families Act of 1997, the aim of the program was to lower barriers to adoption and double the rate of adoption of children in foster care by 2002 from a 1996 figure of 27,000 to a 2002 figure of 54,000.

The name "Adoption 2002" was first used for a report requested by President Bill Clinton by executive memorandum on December 14, 1996.
