= Adoption-Friendly Workplace =

Program of the Dave Thomas Foundation for Adoption

The Adoption-Friendly Workplace is a signature program of the Dave Thomas Foundation for Adoption that encourages employers to offer adoption benefits and celebrating those who do. The Dave Thomas Foundation for Adoption has released the Top 100 Adoption-Friendly Workplace List since 2006. As a result of the Dave Thomas Foundation for Adoption's efforts, organizations nationwide established or enhanced adoption benefits each year.

== Methodology ==
The Best Adoption Friendly Workplace list is determined by an analysis of a company's adoption benefits, such as the amount of financial reimbursement and paid leave available to employees who adopt – without regard to company size. The top 100 employers are then ranked based on the robustness of their adoption benefits. The top ten by organization size, as well as leaders in each industry will also be celebrated, and special recognition will be given to companies who support the cause of adoption and adoptive families in other ways.

== Winners ==
In 2006, Citizens Financial Group, Inc., in Providence, Rhode Island, ranked number 1 with $20,960 financial assistance for adoption and 1 week paid leave. In 2007, Wendy's International, Inc., Dublin, Ohio, ranked number 1 with $23,300 financial assistance for adoption and 6 weeks paid leave.

== Supporting resources ==
The Dave Thomas Foundation offers free toolkits for employers to guide them through the process of proposing and establishing an adoption benefits policy. The Adoption-Friendly Workplace Toolkit includes a sample proposal, policy, reimbursement form, frequently asked questions, news release and tax summary.
