= Adoption Disclosure Register (Ontario) =

Adoption reunion registry

The Adoption Disclosure Register (ADR) is an adoption reunion registry operated by the government of Ontario, Canada. It implements the adoption disclosure provisions of the Child and Family Services Act.

== Background ==
Under Ontario law prior to July 2009, the identity of birth parents was not given out to adoptees, nor was the new identity of adoptees available to birth relatives. Either party seeking to make contact may apply to have their name placed on the register.

== Services offered ==
The register offers two distinct services: passive and active search. In all cases other than medical emergencies, identifying information is never given out before consent is obtained from both parties.

A passive search is simply a list, maintained by the Ministry of Community and Social Services, of adoptees and birth relatives who have requested contact with their birth relatives. When both an adoptee and a birth relative of an adoptee appears on the list, officials alert both to this and contact details are exchanged. Any adoptee or birth relative may request a passive search.

An active search must be done at the request of an adoptee. Government employees who have access to the original name of a specified birth relative (mother, father, grandfather, etc.) then attempt to locate and contact this person. If successful, they ask whether this person desires contact with the adoptee. If so, contact details are exchanged; if not, the adoptee is informed of this and no contact information is given.

The right to request an active search is only offered to adoptees, not birth relatives. However, since the time resources expended in an active search are considerable, there is presently a long queue of outstanding requests for active searches.

== Closure ==
While it implements the relevant legislation correctly, the ADR has received significant amounts of criticism from adoptees and birth relatives for being slow and unreliable. The active search for birth relatives is dependent on government resources, and the waiting list for active search can be as long as a decade.

Frustration with the ADR was the primary motivation for the passing of the Adoption Information Disclosure Act in November 2005. This act, when implemented, will unseal adoption records, allowing individuals to take the initiative of contacting birth relatives.

After the bill's passage, Ontario Social Services Minister Madeleine Meilleur announced the ADR will close once the bill is implemented, beginning with the cessation of active search requests on April 26, 2006.

This proposed closure of the ADR was criticized by the groups that had campaigned for the act's passage, on the basis that the ADR provided important services, such as conducting searches and coordinating reunions, which would be necessary even when records are unsealed.

The Adoption Information Disclosure Act was ruled unconstitutional by an Ontario Superior Court judge and set aside in September 2007, two days after its provisions took effect. The Ontario government has announced that it will not appeal that decision.

As of November 2007, neither the new procedures that were to allow adoptees access to their long form birth certificates on the same basis as all other persons, nor the previous location services under the ADR were available.
