= Hope and Homes for Children =

British registered charity

- Founded: 1994
- Founder: Mark Cook OBE
- Type: Charity
- Registration no.: Registered Charity no. 1089490
- Headquarters: Salisbury, England
- Location: Wilton, Salisbury, Wiltshire
- Region served: Eastern Europe and Central Asia, Central/Southern Europe, East and Southern Africa, Latin America and the Caribbean, India
- CEO: Mark Waddington
- Employees: 198
- Website: https://hopeandhomes.org

Hope and Homes for Children (HHC) is a British registered charity operating and working with children, their families and communities in several countries in Central and Eastern Europe and Africa, to help children grow up in safe and productive environments. The charity moves children out of institutions into family-based care, helps keep together families who are at risk of breakdown due to the pressures of poverty, disease or conflict, and works to prevent child abandonment.

== History ==
Hope and Homes for Children was established by Mark Cook, a retired colonel, and his wife Caroline. The first project was an orphanage in Croatia, in a town called Lipik. Cook was posted there as part of the United Nations Protection Force. Initially, he and other soldiers repaired war-damaged orphanages before realising that what children really required was a family. Hope and Homes for children then began to pioneer the deinstitutionalisation of orphanages

and children's homes. By March 2024, the charity had closed 139 institutions in more than 20 countries, prevented over 288,000 children entering or re-entering institutions and had helped to change childcare systems.

== Programmes ==
The charity's stated mission is "to be the catalyst for the global elimination of institutional care of children". They do this by keeping families together and avoiding separation. They also aim to reunite children with families by closing institutions; where this is not possible they set up alternative family care arrangements such as adoption, fostering and small family homes. The model of deinstitutionaliation that they have developed has been recognised as best practice by UNICEF and the World Health Organization.

Hope and Homes for Children work in six countries in Eastern Europe and two in Africa.

=== Bosnia ===
Bosnia is the first country that Hope and Homes worked in. Having initially renovated orphanages there it learnt that what children really need is a family and instead developed a model to close them with, starting with Dom Most Institution. HHC continues to support the reform of the child care system there.

=== Bulgaria ===
A pilot institution for babies was closed at Teteven in 2010 in partnership with TBACT; it stimulated the government who then asked HHC to close eight more in the Sofia, Pernik, Montana, Ruse, Gabrovo, Targoviste, Plovdiv and Pazardzhik regions.

=== Romania ===
When HHC started working in Romania there were 100,000 children living in Romanian orphanages, and by 2010 there were less than 7,500. It is the largest programme for Hope and Homes for Children, and they have led the closure of institutions and established replacement services in several counties. Working with ARK and the Romanian Government they aim to end the institutionalisation of children by 2020.

=== Moldova ===
HHC's work to close the Cupcui institution in Moldova earned a Human Rights Award from the United Nations Development Programme and other UN agencies, showcasing initiatives promoting human rights in Moldova. In 2012 they completed the closure of Sarata Noua, the first institution for children with learning disabilities in Moldova. They went on to focus on two of the four baby institutions in Moldova, in order to cut off the supply to school-age institutions, ensuring children grow up in family based care.

=== Ukraine ===
HHC has been working in Ukraine since 1999. They have demonstrated models that the government has later adopted, such as for small family homes and mother and baby units. They closed the Makariv institution and set up replacement services to support children and families.

=== Rwanda ===
Having developed a number of community hubs to support vulnerable Rwandan families to stay together, HHC closed Mpore PEFA Orphanage in Kigali, the first orphanage to be closed following best practice in Africa; this was done with the support of the Ministry of Gender and Family Promotion. In 2017 the charity reported that the number of orphanages in Rwanda had fallen to 14, from 400 ten years before.

=== Sudan ===
Work is underway to reform the systems for abandoned babies in Khartoum. Working with the religious community a Fatwa was issued to 'decriminalise' abandoned, illegitimate babies which allowed them to be 'adopted' within the Islamic Kafala principle. Over 2,400 babies have been placed within families rather than in institutions.

== Structure and finances ==
Hope and Homes for Children is a charitable company limited by guarantee, incorporated in 2001, as well as a registered charity. The charity manages a subsidiary, Hope and Homes for Children – Romania.

In the year to December 2018, total income of the organisation was £9.1 million, a decrease on the previous year owing to falls in corporate donations and in income from trusts and foundations. Income included £1m in grants, largely from the Department for International Development and the European Union, the latter to support work in Romania. Expenditure in that year was £12.3m, of which £3m was fundraising costs. The organisation drew on its reserves, which stood at £5.6m at the end of the year.

== Notable people ==
Mark Cook (colonel) founded the charity and was awarded several honours including an OBE and a Heart of Gold award from Esther Rantzen; Caroline Cook was also appointed an OBE. Martin Bell OBE was with Mark Cook when he founded the organisation; he later became a patron.

In 2010, former Defence Minister The Rt. Hon. Michael Mates with William Godfree performed Flanders and Swann songs in aid of the charity.
