= Access to Adoption Records Act =

Ontario (Canada) law passed in 2008

Legislative Assembly of Ontario
- Long title: An Act to amend the Vital Statistics Act in relation to adoption information and to make consequential amendments to the Child and Family Services Act
- Citation: S.O. 2008, c. 5
- Assented to: May 14, 2008

Legislative history
- Bill citation: S.O. 2008, c. 5
- Introduced by: Madeleine Meilleur MPP, Minister of Community and Social Services
- First reading: December 10, 2007
- Second reading: April 3, 2008
- Third reading: May 14, 2008
- Status: Current legislation

The Access to Adoption Records Act (French: Loi sur l'accès aux dossiers d'adoption, known before passage as Bill 12) is an Ontario (Canada) law passed in 2008 regarding the disclosure of information between parties involved in adoptions. It is the successor to the 2005 Adoption Information Disclosure Act, parts of which were struck down in 2007 in a ruling by Judge Edward Belobaba of the Ontario Superior Court. The bill passed third reading on May 14, 2008.

The Act's full name is An Act to amend the Vital Statistics Act in relation to adoption information and to make consequential amendments to the Child and Family Services Act. The most significant provision of the bill was the introduction of a disclosure veto to allow adoptees and birth parents involved in adoptions prior to September 1, 2008, to prevent the release of their names, which would otherwise be available upon request by any concerned party when the adoptee reaches the age of majority.

Adoptions that occurred after September 1, 2008, are open which means that when requested, identifying information about either the adoptee (as long as he/she is over 18 years of age) or the birth parents can be shared. Either party can file a "No Contact Notice" which tells the other party that they do not want to be contacted (although identifying information is still released). If the other person tries to make contact either directly or indirectly after a "No Contact Notice" has been filed, they could be fined up to $50,000.

In May 2009, the Ontario Ministry of Community and Social Services revealed that 2,500 people had filed disclosure vetoes between September 1, 2008, and April 30, 2009, with figures split approximately 50-50 between adoptees and birth parents.
