= Forced adoption in Australia =

Forced adoption in Australia was the practice of taking babies from unmarried mothers, against their will, and placing them for adoption. In 2012 the Australian Senate Inquiry Report into Forced Adoption Practices found that babies were taken illegally by doctors, nurses, social workers and religious figures, sometimes with the assistance of adoption agencies or other authorities, and adopted by married couples. Some mothers were coerced, drugged and illegally had their consent taken. Many of these adoptions occurred after the mothers were sent away by their families "due to the stigma associated with being pregnant and unmarried". The removals occurred predominantly in the second half of the twentieth century. According to Sydney Morning Herald journalist, Marissa Calligeros, it was a practice which has been described as "institutionalised baby farming". In evidence given to the New South Wales Parliamentary Inquiry into Adoption, Centrecare's (Catholic Adoption Agency Sydney) Chief Social Researcher was quoted as admitting to "a stolen white generation".

In response to the Senate Inquiry, on 21 March 2013 Prime Minister Julia Gillard offered a national apology to those affected by forced adoptions; and outlined a range of other government responses.

== Adoption practices in twentieth century Australia ==
Modern adoption is a peculiarly twentieth century phenomenon, with most adoptions taking place between the 1950s and the 1980s. For much of this period, adoption had two key features: the application of "clean break theory", and the framework of "closed adoption". Clean break theory involved the removal of a baby from the mother immediately after birth, often with no contact taking place between parent and child, followed by permanent placement of the baby with an adopting family usually within a period of several weeks. Closed adoption involved the sealing of the record of adoption. Records were thus closed, so that the parties to the adoption remained permanently unaware of the identity of others.

There are no precise estimates of the number of adoptions that took place in Australia, with estimates of around 250,000 being feasible. An unknown proportion of these adoptions involved the placement of the babies of single mothers.

Because of the stigma attached to being born out of wedlock, and the absence of any financial support for single mothers, there was a widespread view at the time that adopting out the babies of unmarried mothers was in the "best interests of the child".

From the 1950s to the 1970s, many Australian single mothers subjected to forced adoption were prescribed stilboestrol to dry up their breast milk. As a result, the women, as well as their subsequent children and even their grandchildren, ended up developing serious diseases such as cancer, childhood arthritis, and infertility.

== Apologies ==
On 19 October 2010, Parliament of Western Australia became the first parliament in Australia to apologise for forced adoption policies of babies born to unwed mothers. "I now apologise to the mothers, their children and families who were adversely affected by these adoption practices", Colin Barnett said. On 18 July 2012, the Parliament of South Australia formally apologised for forced adoption. "Our apology will recognise that those practices directly affected many of those parents whose children were adopted by force and many of those people who were separated from their parents as children", said Premier Jay Weatherill. "This apology is long overdue but we hope it will be a significant moment for those affected." It is estimated more than 17,000 children were adopted out before 1980 and some of these involved forced adoption practices. The Australian Capital Territory Legislative Assembly endorsed a formal apology, delivered by Chief Minister Katy Gallagher, on 14 August 2012. On 20 September 2012, NSW Premier Barry O'Farrell delivered an apology on behalf of the Parliament of New South Wales to the parents and children who were affected by past forced adoption policies. This apology was passed as a resolution of both chambers of the parliament. On 25 October 2012, the Parliament of Victoria apologised for forced adoption practices. The apologies were delivered by Victorian Premier Ted Baillieu and opposition leader Daniel Andrews. The Premier told parliament: "We express our sincere sorrow". "These were misguided, unwarranted and they caused immeasurable pain. Today Victoria parliament is standing up and saying sorry." On 6 August 2012, the Parliament of Tasmania announced that it would present a formal apology over forced adoption policies. and on 23 August 2012, the Queensland government announced that it would also deliver an apology through the Parliament of Queensland, this leaving the Northern Territory as the only jurisdiction not to apologise, or announce a forthcoming apology on the matter.

On 21 March 2013, Julia Gillard apologised on behalf of the Australian Government. The National Archives of Australia was commissioned to develop a website and exhibition to increase understanding of forced adoption practices in Australia, as recommended in the Senate report.

== See also ==
- Adoption in Australia
- Stolen Generations
