= Raise A Child Inc. =

American nonprofit organization

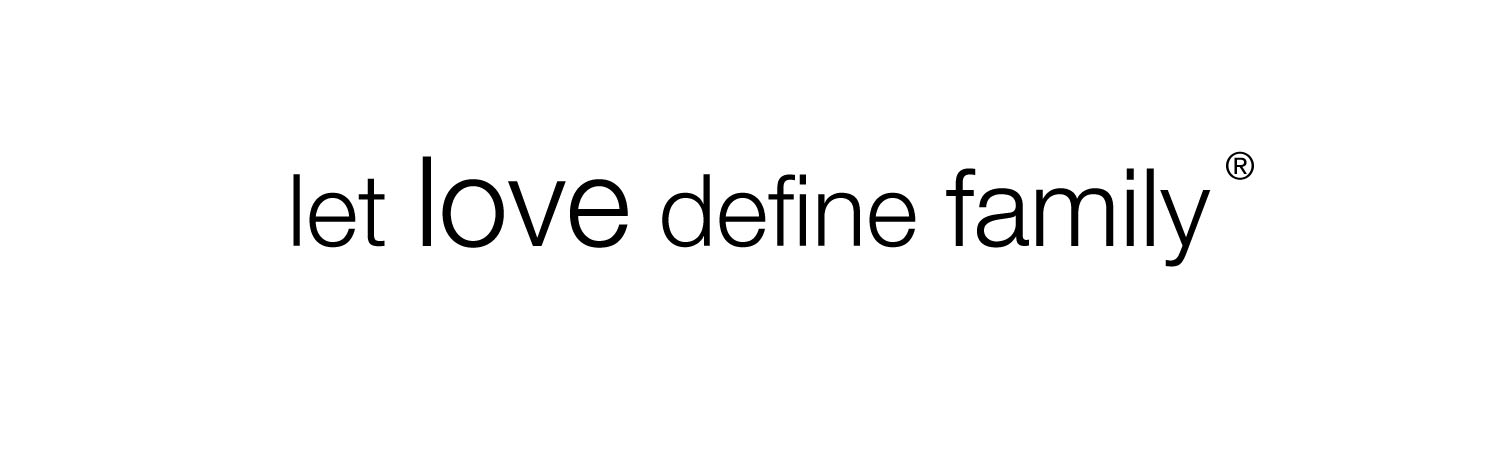
"let love define family" is a registered trademark of Raise A Child Inc.

Raise A Child Inc. (RaiseAChild.US) is a Los Angeles based American 501(c)(3) organization providing support to parties interested in fostering and adoption.
