= Protestant Home for Babies =

Coordinates: 29.925651°N 90.086231°W

Protestant Home for Babies, New Orleans, LA

Protestant Home for Babies was located in the lavish and historic Garden District of New Orleans, Louisiana. It was established in 1926 by community women seeking to provide a shelter for destitute infants. By the early 1950s, maternity services were added to provide short-term shelter for pregnant young women. The shelter continued to provide for adoptable and homeless infants. By 1974 the community's needs for maternity home services decreased and the Board of Directors discontinued the maternity and infant shelters. A group home was established for adolescent girls in need of a nurturing home environment. In 1979, the agency's name was officially changed from Protestant Home for Babies to Raintree Services.

Raintree Services is a non-sectarian social service organization still operating today at the same location. Each year, Raintree assists more than 600 children and families through five specialized programs, which include Raintree House, Raintree Family Care, Early Steps, Afterschool Program and Attendant Care Services.

Today, many adoptees and birth-families from the Protestant Home for Babies, and all over Louisiana, search for each other on the Internet.
