= Jon Hamilton =

American journalist

Jon Hamilton is a journalist and science correspondent for NPR.

Hamilton is an English graduate from Oberlin College. He received his Master's Degree in journalism at Columbia University. He was a media fellow at the Henry J. Kaiser Family Foundation where he delivered a project on state Medicaid programs and privatization.

He began his professional career as a medical reporter for the Commercial Appeal and Physicians' Weekly and then worked as a freelance journalist and writer from 1995 to 1997.

== Awards ==
Hamilton has won a Baker Prize for magazine writing and a Sherwood Traveling Fellowship.
