= Foster care in Australia =

Children of the United Kingdom's Children's Migrant Programme many of whom were placed in foster care in Australia.

Home-based care, which includes foster care, is provided to children who are in need of care and protection. Children and young people are provided with alternative accommodation while they are unable to live with their parents. As well as foster care, this can include placements with relatives or kin, and residential care. In most cases, children in home-based care are also on a care and protection order.

In some cases children are placed in home-based care following a child protection substantiation and where they are found to be in need of a safer and more stable environment. In other situations parents may be incapable of providing adequate care for the child, or accommodation may be needed during times of family conflict or crisis. In the significant number of cases substance abuse is a major contributing factor.

"Respite care" is a type of foster care that is used to provide short-term (and often regular) accommodation for children whose parents are ill or unable to care for them on a temporary basis. It is also used to provide a break for the parent or primary carer to hopefully decrease the chances of the situation escalating to one which would lead to the removal of the child(ren).

As with the majority of child protection services, states and territories are responsible for funding home-based care. Non-government organizations are widely used, however.

In June 2006, there were 25,454 children in out-of-home care in Australia. This compares to 23,695 children in 2005, an increase of 7%.

== The Lost Children ==
An estimated 150,000 British children were sent to overseas colonies and countries in the British Commonwealth such as Australia. This practice was in effect from the beginning of the nineteenth century until 1967. Many of these children were sent to orphanages, foster homes and religious institutions, where they were used as a free source of labour and many were severely abused and neglected. These children were classified as orphans although most were not. In the period after World War II the policy was referred to as the "Child Migrant Programme". The prime consideration was money as it was cheaper to care for children in commonwealth countries than it was in the United Kingdom. At least 10,000 children, some as young as 3, were shipped to Australia after the war, most to join the ranks of the "Forgotten Australians", the term given for those who experienced care in foster homes and institutions in the 20th century. Among these Forgotten Australians were members of the "Stolen Generations", the children of Australian Aborigines, forcibly removed from their homes and raised in white institutions. In 2008 Australian Prime Minister, Kevin Rudd apologised to the approximately 500,000 "forgotten Australians" and in 2010 British Prime Minister Gordon Brown issued a similar apology to those who were victimised by the Child Migrants Programme.

In 2014–2015 the Northern Ireland Historical Institutional Abuse Inquiry considered cases of children forcibly sent to Australia. They found that about 130 young children in the care of voluntary or state institutions were sent to Australia in the period covered by the Inquiry, from 1922 to 1995, but mostly shortly after the Second World War.

=== Current policy ===
There is strong emphasis in current Australian policy and practice to keep children with their families wherever possible. In the event that children are placed in home-based care, every effort is made to reunite children with their families wherever possible.

In the case of Aboriginal and Torres Strait Islander children in particular, but not exclusively, placing the child within the wider family or community is preferred.

== See also ==
- Adoption in Australia
- Child custody
- Child abuse
