= 1998 Oregon Ballot Measure 58 =

Referendum on birth certificates

Ballot Measure 58 was a citizen's initiative that was passed by the voters of the U.S. state of Oregon in the November 1998 General Election. The measure restored the right of adopted adults who were born in Oregon to access their original birth certificates. The measure passed with 609,268 votes in favor, 454,122 against. It was immediately challenged by several birth mothers who had put children up for adoption, which delayed instituting the measure for a year and a half.

Results by county: Yes: 50–60%; 60–70%; No: 50–60%

== Text ==
Upon receipt of a written application to the state registrar, any adopted person 21 years of age and older born in the state of Oregon shall be issued a certified copy of his/her unaltered, original and unamended certificate of birth in the custody of the state registrar, with procedures, filing fees, and waiting periods identical to those imposed upon non-adopted citizens of the State of Oregon pursuant to ORS 432.120 and 432.146. Contains no exceptions.

== Legal challenges ==
On December 1, 1998, a group of birth mothers, represented by attorney Franklin Hunsaker, filed a lawsuit to seek an injunction. Marion County Oregon circuit court judge Albin W. Norblad granted an injunction halting the implementation of Measure 58. Judge Norblad later recused himself from the case and was replaced by Judge Paul Lipscomb.

In his decision, Judge Lipscomb upheld Measure 58, ruling the Oregon Constitution held no promise of secrecy to women who gave their children up for adoption. "Plaintiffs have failed to demonstrate either any contractual right to absolute privacy or confidentiality, or any impermissible impairment of any such rights."

The Oregon Court of Appeals issued a temporary injunction on July 30, 1999. A deadline of August 4 was set for oral arguments in the case. On August 13, the court issued another 90-day stay while it reviewed a constitutional challenge. Yet another stay was granted on September 7, 1999, extending through January 31, 2000.

Oral arguments were heard on November 22, 1999, before the Oregon Court of Appeals, which on December 29 upheld the lower court's decision regarding access to adoptees birth records.

The court of appeals again issued a seven-day stay on December 30, 1999, to allow the plaintiffs to file an emergency appeal to the Oregon Supreme Court. On January 6, 2000, the Oregon Supreme Court ruled that the emergency stay would continue indefinitely. The court declined to hear the case without comment on March 20, 2000, and continued a 21-day stay to give the birth mothers a chance to appeal to the Supreme Court of the United States. The stays were granted four more times, postponing implementation until May 30, 2000.

In the final two legal battles over Measure 58, the birth mothers were denied a motion to reconsider by the Oregon Supreme Court on May 16, 2000. Also on May 23, 2000, the Oregon Supreme Court refused to extend the stay against the new law. The legal battle ended on May 30, 2000, when Supreme Court Justice Sandra Day O'Connor denied a request for a stay.

== Timeline ==
=== 1998 ===
May 22, Supporters of the initiative petition to allow adoptees unseal their birth records turned in 86,422 signatures turned into the Oregon Secretary of State.

July 9, Ballot Measure 58 qualifies with 73,261 signatures.

August 26, Willamette Week publishes a story advocating passage of Measure 58 as a fight for civil rights.

September 2, then Governor of Oregon John Kitzhaber states he opposes the measure.

September 16, Willamette Week publishes story, "Bastard: Adoption in America" which chronicles one person's struggle to find answers about their adoption.

September 23, The Oregonian publishes a column stating that oppose the measure due to privacy concerns.

October 12, Oregon's Secretary of State publishes the Voter's Pamphlet listing arguments both for and against Measure 58.

October 14, Willamette Week publishes an editorial in support of Measure 58.

November 1, An ad appears in The Oregonian that lists the names of 500 birth mothers who support the measure.

November 3, Ballot Measure 58 is passed by the voters 57% to 43%.

December 1, Marion County Circuit Judge Albin W. Norblad grants an injunction halting implementation of Measure 58 as a result of a lawsuit filed by Franklin Hunsaker, on behalf of four anonymous birth mothers.

December 9, Three private parties, including Helen Hill, Chief Petitioner for Measure 58, Curtis Endicott, a St. Helens adoptee, and Susan Updike of Scappoose, a birth mother—and one organization, the Oregon Adoptive Rights Association, seek intervenor status in the Measure 58 lawsuit. Intervenor status would allow them to cross-examine witnesses, examine evidence, and participate in some court activities. These parties are represented in court by Portland attorney Thomas E. McDermott.

December 18, Three more anonymous birth mothers are added as plaintiffs in an amended complaint.

=== 1999 ===
January 19, Judge Norblad hears arguments over granting intervenor status, and hears discussion of procedural issues for protecting plaintiff birth mothers' anonymity. Hearing scheduled for January 28 on the procedural issues.

January 22, Intervenor is status granted to Helen Hill, Curtis Endicott, Susan Updike, and the Oregon Adoptive Rights Association.

April 1, Birth Mother drops out of lawsuit. Jane Doe 3 withdraws as a plaintiff from the case, for reasons not given.

June 17, Judge Norblad recuses himself from the case, which will be taken over by presiding Judge Paul Lipscomb.

July 12, Then Governor Kitzhaber signed into law today HB 3194, an amendment to Measure 58 to provide for a voluntary "Contact Preference Form" to be attached to the original birth certificate. The bill leaves untouched the rights of adoptees and respects the spirit of Measure 58 while alleviating concerns about its "fairness". It is unanimously supported by supporters as well as opponents of Measure 58.

July 15, After the hearing on Wednesday July 14, Judge Lipscomb promises a decision possibly as soon as Friday July 16

July 16, Judge Lipscomb today upheld Measure 58, saying the Oregon Constitution held no promise of secrecy to women who gave their children up for adoption.

"Plaintiffs have failed to demonstrate either any contractual right to absolute privacy or confidentiality, or any impermissible impairment of any such rights."

July 17, The six anonymous birth mothers and their attorney promise to file an appeal of Judge Lipscomb's decision.

July 20, Adoptees begin filing requests with the state office of vital records in anticipation of the lifting of the injunction against Measure 58.

July 21, A Willamette Week article, "Open Sesame", profiles Helen Hill's long involvement in the M58 campaign, and her jubilation at Judge Lipscomb's decision.

July 22, The six anonymous birth mothers file a motion with the Oregon Supreme Court to continue the injunction against Measure 58.

July 23, The State of Oregon's Archive Division gears up for an onrush of requests from adoptees requesting their original birth certificates.

July 27, In a telephone conference today with lawyers, Judge Lipscomb refused to suspend his decision upholding Measure 58. However, attorneys for opponents of the law have said they will ask the Oregon Court of Appeals for a stay to continue to prevent it from taking effect while they appeal the case to that court. They will have about two days to file that motion before the State of Oregon files an order and the circuit court decision takes effect.

July 30, The Oregon Court of Appeals on Friday issued a temporary stay to prevent Measure 58 from taking effect, while it considers whether to continue blocking the law during an appeal. The appeals court gave the state until August 12 to respond.

August 4, The Oregon Appeals Court has set a deadline of August 12 for arguments to be submitted on the issue of extending the stay on Measure 58 pending a new appeal. Until then, Measure 58 is still on hold.

August 13, State appeals court puts adoption law on hold another 90 days. The Oregon Appeals Court today issued a new 90-day stay on Measure 58 while it reviews the constitutional challenges.

September 7, The Oregon Court of Appeals extended their stay of Measure 58 through January 31, 2000. Chief Judge Mary Deits said the court will hear oral arguments on November 22.

September 11, Adoptee Rights Spokesman Dies Waiting for Measure to Take Effect. Curtis Endicott died of a lifelong, undiagnosed lung ailment at age 51, while waiting for Oregon's successful Adoptee Rights Initiative (Measure 58) to take effect

November 22, The Oregon State Court of Appeals hold oral arguments in Measure 58 case.

December 29, Appeals court upholds adoption records access.

December 30, The Court of Appeals has issued a seven-day further stay, to allow the plaintiffs to file an emergency appeal to the Oregon Supreme Court to review the case and to impose a longer stay while the appeals process is pursued.

On the same day, the Bureau of Vital Statistics has been ordered to immediately stop processing Oregon adoptees' requests for birth certificates.

=== 2000 ===
January 5, Franklin Hunsaker, attorney for the six plaintiffs, files an emergency appeal of the Appeals Court ruling to the Oregon Supreme Court. The Oregonian reports Birth mothers seek hold on law

January 6, Oregon Supreme Court ruled that the seven day stay granted by the Court of Appeals on December 30 will continue indefinitely.

March 20, Oregon Supreme Court lets Measure 58 stand. The Oregon Supreme Court today declined without comment to hear the appeal challenging Measure 58. The Court continued a stay suspending the law for 21 more days, allowing the plaintiffs to ask the Court to reconsider, or to file an appeal to the U.S. Supreme Court.

April 5, As the 21-day stay granted by the Oregon Supreme Court approaches expiration, plaintiffs' attorney Hunsaker asked the court for another 21-day stay to allow more time to file an appeal.

April 10, The Oregon State Supreme Court has granted another 21-day stay till May 2 to allow plaintiffs' attorney Franklin Hunsaker more time to file a motion for reconsideration.

May 2, The Oregon State Supreme Court has granted yet another stay while it considers a motion filed today by attorney Franklin Hunsaker asking that the Supreme Court itself should rule, not just let the lower court decision stand.

May 16, The Oregon Supreme Court today denied without comment a motion to reconsider its decision to let stand an appellate court ruling that upheld the legality of Measure 58. Yet another stay has been granted however until May 30 to allow the challengers of the measure to appeal to the United States Supreme Court.

May 19, Franklin Hunsaker filed a motion with the Oregon Court of Appeals to stay enforcement of Measure 58 until the U.S. Supreme Court can rule on the plaintiff's petition for certiorari. The Appeals Court asked for opposing arguments to the motion from The Attorney General's office and intervenors' attorneys McDermott and Pulvers.

May 23, The Oregon Court of Appeals denied a motion by Hunsaker to extend a stay against Measure 58. Plaintiffs next step is to seek a stay from a justice of The U.S. Supreme Court to allow time to file an appeal there. All challenges to Measure 58 at the state level are exhausted.

May 25, An AP news story, "Oregon Adoptees To Get Records", notes that unless the Supreme Court agrees to hear a constitutional challenge to Measure 58, the measure will go into effect on Tuesday May 30 at 5:01 p.m.

May 30, Supreme Court Justice O'Connor denies request to stay Measure 58. Plaintiff's attorney Franklin Hunsaker has appealed at the last minute to Justice Thomas, who has not responded yet. Although Court rules allow this, such moves are not favored, and would usually need a majority vote of the full court to be accepted. Measure 58 goes into effect at 5:01 p.m.

== See also ==
- List of Oregon ballot measures
- Oregon Supreme Court
- Adoption
