= Adoption Covenant =

Adoption Covenant is a 501(c)(3) charitable organization formed in 2003 in Lubbock, Texas, by Merinda K. Condra. It became a licensed child placing agency in 2004. In 2012, Adoption Covenant was nominated by Randy Neugebauer for special recognition, and as a result of this received the Congressional Coalition on Adoption Institute's 2012 Congressional Angel in Adoption Award. At that time, it was reported that Adoption Covenant had been involved in helping over 300 children find their forever homes.
