= List of instruments used in microbiological sterilization and disinfection =

This is a list of instruments used in microbiological sterilization and disinfection.

== Instrument list ==
Instrument	Uses
Instrument sterilizers	Used to sterilize instruments in absence of an autoclave
Dressing drums	storage of gowns, cotton, linen, etc.
The microscope	used for visualising minute structures including microbes
Various stains	used to stain microscopic slides to get contrast
Hot air oven	used in sterilizing instruments for various aseptic procedures, specially if that can not be autoclaved like powders
Koch's or Arnold's steam sterilizer	used for steam sterilization
A pressure cooker	used as a portable autoclave
Biological and chemical indicators	Used to ascertain if a certain process has been completed, e.g. spores used in an autoclave are killed if autoclaving is properly done
Filters:	
•Candle filter:	used as household water filters and as filters for large particles in the laboratories
••Diatomaceous earth filters like the Berkefeld filter	-do-
••Unglazed porcelain filters like the Chamberland filter	-do-
•Disk filter or Seitz filter	previously used as bacteriological filters; presently obsolete
•Sintered glass filter	used as a good particle filter in laboratories
•Membrane filter and Syringe filter	used as primary bacterial/cell filters in procedures as toxin, immunoglobulin, etc. production, where the product gets denatured on heating
•Air filter	like HEPA filter, used in various laboratories and clean rooms to produce lamellar air flow
Radiation:	
•Gamma ray source	used in sterilization of heat-labile products like plastic or rubber syringes, catheters and gloves
•X-ray source	-do-
•Infrared light source	-do-
•Ultraviolet light source	-do-
Inspissator	used to produce culture media for bacteriology that contain egg or serum, which coagulate on heating
Tyndallizer	a process of sterilization from spore bearing bacteria; video link
Water bath	to heat things uniformly from all sides at a set temperature up to the boiling point of water
Needle Destroyer	Burns the needle electrically either cuts the syringe manually or burns it electrically
Sharps container	A imperforable container for sharp wastes like needles, blades, microscope slides, broken glass, etc.
Cardboard biomedical waste containers	
Reusable tubs	
Colour coded biomedical waste bags (India)	-
•Yellow plastic bags	for human anatomical, animal, microbiological and soiled waste
•Red disinfected container or plastic bags	microbiological waste, solid waste(IV tubes, catheters, etc.)
•Blue or White plastic bag or puncture proof containers	sharps, disposable tubing, etc.
•Black Plastic bag or puncture proof containers	discarded medicines, incineration ash, chemical waste
Disinfectants	for cleaning
Incinerators	to burn biomedical wastes like removed body parts, blood, gauze, linen, etc.
