= Andrew Bridge (lawyer) =

American lawyer

- Born: Los Angeles, USA
- Education: Wesleyan University (BA); Harvard University (JD); Fulbright Scholar, Federal Republic of Germany
- Known for: Lawyer, Campaigner for Children, Author of Hope's Boy

Andrew Bridge is a New York Times Bestselling author, American lawyer, and advocate for children and families living in poverty. He became the executive director of the California-based Alliance for Children's Rights in 1997. Bridge spent 12 years in the foster care system as a child in Los Angeles County, and achieved a scholarship to Wesleyan University, became a Fulbright Scholar, Rockefeller Foundation Bellagio Resident, Stueben Schultz Gesellschaft Scholar, Lyndon B. Johnson Scholar, and graduate from Harvard Law School.

While in foster care as a child, Bridge was confined to the MacLaren Children's Center in Los Angeles County, a facility criticized for its harsh treatment of children and ultimately closed pursuant to a judicial settlement in Katie A. v. Los Angeles County. As an adult, Bridge represented children at the facility.

Under Bridge's leadership, the Alliance led the establishment of National Adoption Day in the United States. Bridge led both a successful constitutional challenge to local judicial practices that forbid foster youth and their families from speaking publicly about their experiences and treatment by foster care officials, as well as a successful challenge to halt prevailing child welfare practices that allowed foster care officials to place children in foster homes, group homes, and other residential settings without later visiting foster children to ensure their ongoing well-being and safety.

Later Bridge joined the Broad Foundation, which under his tenure established the framework for Los Angeles County's $3.4 billion federal foster care financial waiver, allowing federal funding to support children in their own families rather than requiring children to be removed from their families and taken into state care in order to receive assistance. He is noted for his defense of families whose children are involved in state systems of care and criticism of the use of congregate care facilities in child welfare systems.

Bridge began his legal career at the Democratic law firm of Manatt, Phelps & Phillips, LLP practicing in the corporate mergers and acquisitions department of the firm. He left Manatt, Phelps joining the Judge David L. Bazelon Center in Washington, D.C., to litigate the constitutional and federal statutory rights of children in Alabama's public psychiatric hospitals and mental health facilities under federal class actions in Wyatt v. Poundstone and R.C. v. Hornsby. Following the Alliance for Children's Rights and his work at the Broad Foundation, Bridge went on to serve as Senior Innovation Adviser to the State of Illinois and its child welfare system. His childhood memoir Hope's Boy was named a New York Times Bestseller, Publishers Weekly Bestseller, Los Angeles Times Discoveries Book, People Magazine Critic's Choice, and Washington Post Book of the Year. He has contributed to The Los Angeles Times, The New York Times, and other publications.

In addition, Bridge chaired the 1999-2000 Los Angeles County Blue Ribbon Task Force on the safety of children in the nation's largest child welfare system, which recommended a fundamental overhaul of the treatment, placement, and care of children. He has served as a University of California Regents' Lecturer. In 2015, he was appointed Commissioner to the Los Angeles County Probation Commission. He is a founding Director of The New Village Charter School for Girls, a charter school for pregnant and parenting teens and California's first charter school solely for girls.
