= Deinstitutionalisation (orphanages and children's institutions) =

Process of closing down orphanages

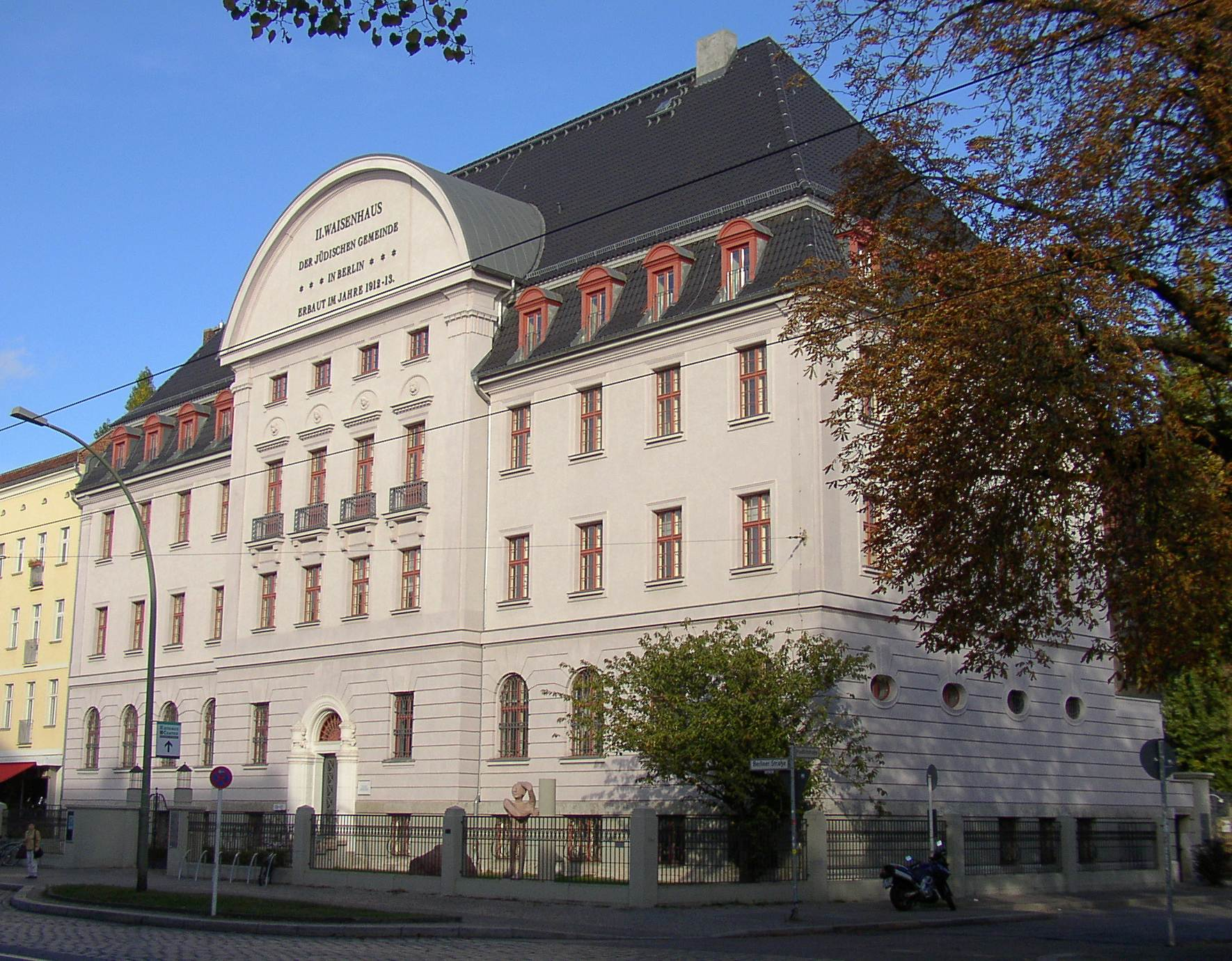
Former Berlin Pankow orphanage

Deinstitutionalisation is the process of reforming child care systems and closing down orphanages and children's institutions, finding new placements for children currently resident and setting up replacement services to support vulnerable families in non-institutional ways. It became common place in many developed countries in the post war period. It has been taking place in Eastern Europe since the fall of communism and is now encouraged by the EU for new entrants. It is also starting to take hold in Africa and Asia although often at individual institutions rather than statewide. New systems generally cost less than those they replace as many more children are kept within their own family. Although these goals have been made internationally, they are actively being working towards as reform and new reforms are put into practice slowly as is fit for each country.

== Countries involved ==
=== North America and Western Europe ===
Deinstitutionalisation largely occurred in the US between 1941 and 1980. In the US it was a consequence of the Social Security Act of 1935 (SSA), which allowed Aid to Dependent Children (ADC) to be passed, and meant that children could no longer be removed from their families due to poverty alone. Deinstitutionalisation occurred over a similar period in some Western European countries, although rates varied between countries. In 2009, the European Union began to prioritise deinstitutionalisation among member-states. The European Commission changed its funding regulations to promote deinstitutionalisation and discourage investment of EU funds on residential institutions. This resulted, in particular, from an understanding of the legal framework, including the UN Convention on the Rights of Persons with Disabilities, the UN Convention on the Rights of the Child and the European Convention on Human Rights. Deinstitutionalisation also progressed in some South American countries. The current alternative in the US is known as the Foster Care system.

=== Eastern Europe ===
Deinstitutionalisation is currently most common in the former Soviet Bloc. Increasingly the institutions that remain in Eastern Europe are occupied by disabled children who can be harder to place in the community. Completing their closure and supporting the development of places they can be cared for in the community is seen as a priority by the EU and that has encouraged many countries wishing to accede to it including the Czech Republic, Romania, whose orphanages are the most infamous in the world, and Bulgaria. It is also happening in Hungary where no new children can be placed in orphanages. Moldova has made considerable progress, where investment in inclusive education means many children with disabilities can live at home with their families, reducing the need for institutional placements. Ukraine, Belarus and Bosnia. Azerbaijan has established a Department for De-institutionalisation and Child Protection.

=== Africa ===
The majority of orphanages in Africa are funded by private donors and are often not part of a larger coherent child protection system. In Africa deinstitutionalisation has support from the Governments of Rwanda and Ghana and Ethiopia however as the governments do not run the institutions the process can be more complex. Sudan is also making moves towards deinstitutionalisation with the partial closure of Mygoma Orphanage and the setting up of foster placements for babies abandoned there consistent with the principle of Kafala.

More recently many countries in Sub-Saharan Africa have begun to work on the transition from institutional to community-based care for children.

As a whole there is estimated to be about 52 million orphans in Africa, largely due to high mortality rates from various diseases within the continent (HIV/AIDS, malaria, tuberculosis), but also due to natural disasters, conflicts or other pregnancy and birth related reasons. In Malawi, some are simply abandoned due to financial of family reasons in orphanages. In 1997 the Chikondri Centre opened, and the founder, Mussa, found that many ended up in "special need's schools, vocational training, starting small businesses, getting jobs and living independently." In 2014, UNICEF started aiding the Malawi government to support the change from institutionalized care to a more family-centered care, following the global trend to do this across the world. As of 2018, 300 children had been transitioned through this standard.

The Maghreb region in North Africa has some of the highest rates of child institutionalisation in the world: Algeria 550,000, Libya 80–145,000, Mauritania 45,850, Morocco 471,006, and Tunisia 140,000. With high rates of poverty, limited social services and no viable alternative care options, such as foster care, institutionalisation remains an important intervention in child protection processes in the Maghreb, and often the only intervention.

=== Asia ===
There are some small scale moves to increase the number of family based placements in China but this is not yet a large scale movement. It is now a priority of NGO's in Nepal and the government in Cambodia. In Malaysia, the government is piloting deinstitutionalisation detailed analysis in Negeri Sembilan State as a pilot project, with the aim of scaling up to the entire country.

== Why orphanages are being questioned ==
More than 4 out of 5 children living in institutions are not orphans. This amount rises to 98% in Eastern Europe. The nature of orphanages means that they often fail to provide the individual sustained attention and stimulation a child would get from growing up within a family. In many cases the children living in them are at risk of harm. There are also many reports of orphanages being abusive or having very high death rates. They are a particular issue for babies and children under three years old as they can stop them making the attachments that they should. These attachments can be broken by staff changing jobs and children moving to other rooms as they get older. In reality a very small proportion of AIDS orphans are in orphanages and there is no way orphanages could be a sustainable option for all AIDS orphans, even if it was desirable.

=== The Bucharest Early Intervention Project (BEIP) ===
This Randomised Controlled Trial is a scientific study that compares the development of children raised in institutions with children raised in birth families and foster care. It is the first study to assess brain functioning among children who have experienced institutionalisation. The study took random samples of 208 children and followed their physical growth, cognitive, emotional and behavioral development over a number of years. The study found that the institutionalised children were severely impaired in IQ and manifested a variety of social and emotional disorders, as well as changes in brain development.

- For every 2.6 months spent in a Romanian institution a child falls behind one month of normal growth
- Institutionalised children had significantly lower IQs and levels of brain activity than the other children, especially those who were institutionalised at a young age
- Children in institutions were far more likely to have social and behavioural abnormalities, including aggressive behaviour problems, attention problems and hyperactivity and a syndrome that mimics autism.
- This syndrome and the behaviours reduce when the child is placed in a family. However, the earlier an institutionalised child was placed into foster care, the better the recovery.

=== The Lancet Commission ===
In 2020, the Lancet Journal published the findings of the Lancet Group Commission on institutionalisation and deinstitutionalisation of children, including a systematic and integrative review of evidence regarding effects on development. This meta-analysis of 308 studies found strong negative associations between institutional care and children's development, especially in relation to physical growth, cognition and attention. Significant but smaller associations were found between institutionalisation and socioemotional development and mental health. Leaving institutions for foster or family care is associated with significant recovery from some developmental outcomes (e.g. growth and cognition) but not for others (e.g. attention). The length of time in institutions was associated with increased risk of adverse sequalae and diminished chance of recovery. The Commission concluded that reducing the number of children entering institutions and increasing the number leaving institutions is urgently needed.

Universal Health Coverage 2030 has an aim for these to include "advocacy, accountability, knowledge exchange and learning, and civil society engagement" supported multilaterally by UNESCO, the World Bank, and UNICEF under the Global Partnership for Education to focus on accomplishing this by strengthening the education systems in low-income countries. The focus and guidelines for international policies is to transform care systems based on the idea that children thrive and are supported the best in a family-based environment.

Some examples of this in action include the UK Aid Direct funding guidance from the UK Government's Department for International Development, which prevents private rather than governmental funding proposals from trying to form child institutions. Similarly, the US has the Advancing Protection and Care for Children in Adversity under its government strategy from 2019 to 2023, which states its intentions to fund family-first in international development and funding. Additionally, part of the problem has also included volunteerism, and in response, foreign policy has been created to limit and properly address this. Of all the foreign legislation, Australia has the most comprehensive model on developing specific legislation on what volunteering in children's institutions looks likes. Faith-based organisations, which often lead these efforts, engage in discussions of voluntourism and the negative consequences of supporting institutions.

== Priorities for children living in institutions ==
It is considered important that all institution-to-home transitions must be accompanied by adequate preparation through individual and group counseling. The development of social work teams to manage fostering and adoption programs is also considered important. The goal for national plans revolved around informed international experience and guidelines, working and partnering with other countries and organizations to ensure that the process, timing and phasing are done realistically, with a proper focus on children with their families, and adequately provide for a variety of needs, from early intervention to alternative care. Additionally, there is a focus that it is ethically done and effectively monitored and evaluated, and promotes access to programs and services that address and support the placement of children in families, as well as undergirds children who are at risk for losing their family or without parental care.

=== Reunification with family ===
When possible, children are reunited with their birth or extended family. This may require short term psychosocial or financial support but is generally seen as the ideal.

=== Support to transition into independent living ===
Children transitioning out of care and into the community may need significant support as their life skills may be limited. Failure to prepare them can cause a significant number of them to return to institutions in later life or end up in crime or prostitution.

=== Adoption ===
Domestic adoption is adoption within the home country. Until a country's child protection system is well developed the adoption of children internationally is at risk of corruption.

=== Long term fostering ===
Long term fostering, defined as fostering for over a year, can often bridge the time between the closure of an institution and independent life.

=== Small group homes ===
Small group homes or family type homes - ideally with 8 or fewer children - can provide life-time care for the most disabled children or act as a half way house where children leaving an institution can learn to live in a family.

== Longer term replacement services ==
The majority of orphans are absorbed within their own extended families. This is commonly known as alternative family care. Many efforts for the long-term care of children without parental care have this at their heart. Successful deinstitutionalisation is accompanied by building the capacity of social services to run fostering and adoption services for new children at risk of separation. Other support structures for families at risk of separation can include facilities such as day care centres for disabled children or young babies. These can allow a mother to go to work so that she can earn a wage and support her family. After school clubs may also meet a similar need.

Young mothers may be ostracized by their families. A mother and baby support arrangement can assist them in their early days together. This can be enhanced with counselling to the grandparents and extended family. This is a much shorter intervention which keeps families together at less cost and without harm to the child. Hasty deinstitutionalisation, closing the institution and reuniting the children, without properly thought out alternatives can be detrimental.

Setting up new services is not only considered better for the social, physical and cognitive development of children, but its cost can be as low as one-sixth the cost of institutionalized care once the costs of making the transition have been funded.

Ending the Institutionalisation of Children Globally, The Time is Now
