= Adoption in Guatemala =

From 1996 to 2007, Guatemala was one of the major providers for children for international adoption, peaking at 5,577 children adopted in 2007. Since reforms in 2007–08, aimed at combating extensive corruption in the adoption process, the numbers have fallen drastically. However, the numbers of children placed with Guatemalan families has remained roughly constant at around 250 per year both before and after the new legislation.

In July 2026, the country announced it would resume international adoption for roughly 390 children who have exhausted all possibilities of adoption in-country.

== International adoption ==
International adoption from Guatemala increased fourfold from 731 in 1996 to 3289 in 2002, when Guatemala ratified the Hague Adoption Convention in response to widespread reports of corruption and coercion in the system. However, in late 2003 the ratification was overturned by the Constitutional Court of Guatemala, and adoptions resumed. They peaked in 2007, when 5,577 Guatemalan-born children were adopted abroad, with 4,728 of these going to the United States; following the failed ratification in 2003, most other developed countries had prevented further adoptions from Guatemala. The system was heavily criticised for corruption, coercion and a lack of transparency; large numbers of the adopted babies were effectively purchased from women in rural districts, and as many as 500 cases of kidnapping were believed to be linked to children who were later adopted overseas.

The adoption legislation was heavily reformed in late 2007 to become compliant with the Hague Convention, and international adoptions effectively ceased in 2008. The new system is still viewed as flawed and ineffective; of 153 cases studied in 2010, 78% infringed the new legislation in some way, with as many as 50% involving children who were declared adoptable without a thorough investigation of their background or full attempts to identify their birth families.

Pending the development of a robust adoption system, the US now only approves transitional cases, where adoption had begun before the Hague ratification, and adoption numbers have dropped as low as 32 in 2011.

Since closing international adoptions nearly two decades ago, the country has made several strides in improving the standards in adoption. Biological tests, follow-up reports, and a number of other security and safety measures have been implemented to prevent the rampant abuse of the adoption system that led to the closure of the system in the first place.

Guatemala plans to open the adoptions for a select group of priority cases that have exhausted all in-country options starting in January 2027. Only about 390 children are eligible and the country’s National Adoption Council (CNA) hopes to process about 12 international adoptions per year once the process begins.

== Domestic adoption ==
Domestic adoption has, in recent years, been much less common than international adoption in Guatemala. In 2006, during the period of active international adoption, it was estimated that only 5% of adoptees were placed with Guatemalan families, which would be around 250 children. In 2009, 559 children in institutions were declared legally adoptable; of these, 253 were placed with Guatemalan families.

The CNA reports that only about 420 children out of the over 4,000 children without parents or guardians are eligible for adoption. 92% of those fall into priority categories — sibling groups, children with special needs or disabilities, or children over the age of 6 — while the majority of prospective adoptive parents are looking for children between the age of 0 and 2.
