= Bastard Nation =

North American adoptee advocacy and support organization

- Formation: 1996; 30 years ago
- Founder: Bastard Nation Founding Foundlings
- Type: Nonprofit organization
- Legal status: 501(c)(4) organization
- Purpose: Adoptee advocacy and support
- Region served: North America
- Website: bastards.org

Bastard Nation is a North American adult adoptee political advocacy and support organization. It was founded in 1996 by denizens of the Usenet newsgroup alt.adoption Shea Grimm, Damsel Plum, Marley Greiner and Lainie Petersen. The original intent of the organization was to support adult adoptees in gaining access to their original birth certificates as a civil right, rather than as a vehicle for facilitating a search, which had been the aim of prior open records organizations. It is also distinguished from search-and-reconnection focused organizations in that it supports the full spectrum of the adult adoptee experience, including adoptees who do not wish to search and adoptees whose reconnections were a bad experience.

Besides advocating adult adoptee access to original birth certificates, Bastard Nation also launches campaigns against negative stereotypes of adoption and adoptees.

North American adoptee birth certificates were originally sealed only to non-family members in the early 20th century but after World War II most states sealed adoptee birth certificates permanently to all parties involved: the adoptee, the adoptive parents and the birthparents.

The group has been successful in getting several states in the United States to approve legislation to open sealed records, for example in Oregon by Ballot Measure 58, described in the book Adoption Politics: Bastard Nation & Ballot Initiative 58 by E. Wayne Carp (2004). They have members throughout the United States, Canada and the world.

The name is a reference to the fact that most adopted children were born illegitimate, hence are literally bastards. The term bastard is employed both for shock value, and in an effort to reclaim the term for common usage (as was done by the organization Queer Nation with the word queer).

== See also ==
- Adoptee rights
- Canadian Council of Natural Mothers
