= Adoption reunion registry =

An adoption reunion registry is a formal mechanism where adoptees and their birth family members can be reunited. Registries may be free or charge fees, be facilitated by non-profit organizations, government agencies or private businesses.

Generally, such adoption registries exist only in countries which practiced closed adoption, i.e. adoption in which the full identities of the birth parents, birth family members and the adopting family are not readily disclosed.

Some reunion registries are based on mutual consent and do matches from the information provided by the registrants. Others, run by governmental agencies, have access to the original documents identifying a birth family or adopting family. This is a form of adoption disclosure. In general, adoptees must be adults before they may be given identifying information, or at least age 18. In the United States, state law governs whether such an institution may release this identifying information to the interested party. Some states have an adoption registry, in which both the adopted adult and birthparent must register before information will be provided. In other states, if the adoptee requests information, the organization will contact the birth parent and request consent for a reunion.

In Canada, adult adoptees from British Columbia, Newfoundland, and Ontario generally have access to their own birth and adoption information provided no disclosure veto has been filed. In other provinces/territories, limited access to information is allowed; all jurisdictions have some form of reunion register.

In the United Kingdom, adoption law has been amended to allow for open adoptions, the right to access one's records, and a state-run adoption reunion registry has been established.

Though many such registries are operated by government agencies, many private registries do exist, and can be found on the Web. These tend to be owned and/or managed by members of the adoption community and are generally more successful than government-run registries.

A problem generally with state-run registries has been the lack of publicity surrounding them. In contrast, in April 2005, the state-run National Adoption Contact Preference Register Trace Your Birth Family - Index was launched in Ireland with a national radio and newspaper advertising campaign, and included an application form for the registry being delivered to every household. The Irish registry allows a person using it to specify whether or not they want contact and/or reunion, what form that contact should take (e.g., letter, phone, e-mail), and, if they do not want contact at the time being, still allows for the passing of medical and/or background information to the other party.
