= Adoption and Safe Families Act =

Act of the 105th United States Congress

Adoption and Safe Families Act of 1997
- Enacted by: the 105th United States Congress
- Effective: November 19, 1997

Citations
- Public law: Pub. L. 105–89 (text) (PDF)

Legislative history
- Introduced in the House by Dave Camp (R-MI) on February 27, 1997; Committee consideration by Ways and Means; Passed the House on April 30, 1997 (Yeas: 416; Nays: 5); Passed the Senate on November 8, 1997 (Unanimous consent); Signed into law by President Bill Clinton on November 19, 1997

The Adoption and Safe Families Act (ASFA, Public Law 105–89) was signed into law by President Bill Clinton on November 19, 1997, after having been approved by the United States Congress earlier in the month.

== Background ==
ASFA was enacted in a bipartisan manner to correct problems inherent within the foster care system that deterred adoption and led to foster care drift. Many of these problems had stemmed from an earlier bill, the Adoption Assistance and Child Welfare Act of 1980, although they had not been anticipated when that law was passed, as states decided to interpret that law as requiring biological families be kept together no matter what. The biggest change to the law was how ASFA amended Title IV-E of the Social Security Act regarding funding.

Moreover, ASFA marked a fundamental change to child welfare thinking, shifting the emphasis towards children's health and safety concerns and away from a policy of reuniting children with their birth parents without regard to prior abusiveness. As such, ASFA was considered the most sweeping change to the U.S. adoption and foster care system in some two decades. One of ASFA's lead sponsors, Republican Senator John H. Chafee of Rhode Island, said, "We will not continue the current system of always putting the needs and rights of the biological parents first. ... It's time we recognize that some families simply cannot and should not be kept together."

Ideas for the bill originated with both Democrats and Republicans. First Lady of the United States Hillary Clinton originally voiced interest in the issue of orphaned children in an article she wrote in 1995. She then held public events to bring the issue exposure, and met with U.S. Department of Health and Human Services officials and private foundation executives over policy questions and recommendations. She cited the Act as the achievement which she initiated and shepherded that provided her with the greatest satisfaction. The bill began in Congress with bipartisan support, then became contentious over issues of terminating birth parents' rights to children and funding levels for programs to keep children out of foster care. Hillary Clinton played a key role in finding a compromise between Republicans and Democrats on the latter issue after negotiations first broke down.

== Legislative history ==
Dave Camp, Republican representatives for Michigan's 4th district at the time, introduced the ASFA to the House Committee on Ways and Means on February 27, 1997. The committee heard several witnesses that advocated for the ASFA while providing relevant inferences as to the state of the current adoption system. The first version of the bill as presented to the committee, Title I section 5, required that actions be taken to strip parental rights from parents who have neglected their child for "18 months of the most recent 24 months". Maureen K. Hogan, executive director of the Adopt a Special Kid/America, spoke as a witness at the February 27th committee hearing and suggested that section 5 of Title I be amended to suggest "placing a 12- month limit on family reunification" in place of the original language. (cite committee hearing). The final form of the bill, taking into consideration Mrs. Hogan's suggestion, landed on the "15 of the most recent 22 months" timeline.

On November 13, the house and senate agreed on the final version of the bill and voted in favor of its passing. President Bill Clinton Signed the ASFA into law on November 19, 1997. Throughout the process of drafting the ASFA, Congress in both the Senate and the house emphasized the need for speedy legislative reform for the foster care system. In greeting the final measure, Bill Clinton stated that the bill "makes clear that children's health and safety are the paramount concerns."

Timeline
Feb 27, 1997	Bill introduced to the House. TITLE: Encouraging Adoption. Committee on Ways and Means Serial No. 105-3
April 28, 1997	TITLE: Adoption Promotion Act of 1997. Committee on Ways and Means. House
April 30, 1997	House consideration and passage of H.R. 867
May 21, 1997	TITLE: Child Welfare Reform. COMMITTEE: subcommittee on Social Security and Family Policy, Committee on Finance. Senate
Oct 8, 1997	Promotion of Adoption, Safety, and Support for Abused and Neglected Children. Committee on Finance. Senate
Nov 8, 1997	Senate consideration and passage of H.R. 867 with an amendment.
Nov 13, 1997	Senate concurrence in the House amendment to H.R. 867. House concurrence in the Senate amendment to H.R. 867, with an additional amendment
Nov 19, 1997	President Clinton signs bill into law

== Major provisions ==
The major provisions of the law include:

Title I: Reasonable Efforts and Safety Requirements for Foster Care and Adoption Placements:

- Requires that States move to terminate parental rights for children who have been in Foster Care for 15 out of the last 22 months
- Exceptions to the 15/22 rule include:
  1. When the child is in a Foster Home with a biological relative (Kinship Care)
  2. When the Agency documents a compelling reason why parental termination is not in the Child's best interest
  3. When the State has failed to provide services necessary for reunification
- Requires that Permanency Hearings be held every 12 months
- Clarifies cases in which States are not required to reunite Families (Aggravated Circumstances)
- Expands family preservation and support services
- Requires background checks for all foster parent applicants and prohibits approval for any individual that has committed a felony or violence against child in the past five years.

Title II: Incentives for Providing Permanent Families for Children:

- Extends subsidies for adoptive children
- Provides incentives for States to improve adoption rates
- Requires States to document efforts to move children toward adoption
- Expands health care coverage for adoptive children
- Provides funding for efforts at encouraging adoption

Title III: Additional Improvements and Reforms:

- Clarifies that interstate boundaries should not delay adoption.
- Requires that children with disabilities entered into foster care are provided adequate health insurance.

Title IV: Miscellaneous:

- Allows parents to assign next of kin if they are in a near-death situation so that their child does not have to enter foster care

== Impact ==
As a result, some states have relied upon the three exceptions in the law more as part of stressing reunification, while other states have stressed adoption.

Twelve years after the Implementation of ASFA, the Urban Institute's Center for Social Policy did a study reviewing the effectiveness of AFSA. In the study conclusion, The Urban Institute declared that AFSA had increased the number of children leaving foster care, but that AFSA had failed to properly support blood relatives. Multiple other studies show that ASFA increased foster care exits, including Chapin Hill's study showing a significant increase in adoption rates. Other researchers have shown that not only did adoptions increase, but that permanency placements happened at a statistically significantly faster rate.

The number of youth adopted from care has steadily risen since ASFA's passage: up from roughly 38,000 in 1998 to over 66,000 in 2019, according to federal data.

In a research study of California child welfare cases, researchers show an increase in the rate of reunification and a decline in foster care re-entry (e.g., recidivism) rate in the post-ASFA era.

In a report published in 2018 by the "Memphis Law Review", Texas Tech University law professor DeLeith Gossett said “The act's financial incentives have disrupted families permanently by the speedy termination of parental rights, without the accompanying move from foster care to adoptive homes" and said "The programs that the Adoption and Safe Families Act govern thwart its very purpose as children continue to languish in foster care waiting for permanent adoptive homes, often until they age out of the system into negative life outcomes." “ASFA was blamed for leaving a lot of children as orphans and that certainly wasn't the intention of ASFA," she said. "There has been concern we moved to permanency but didn't pay attention to the parent's needs."

Former Georgia Senator Nancy Schaefer was a vocal critic of the corruption that the Adoption and Safe Families Act incentivized in many child protection organizations. She argued that the thousands of dollars in adoption bonuses for every child adopted out rewarded such organizations with seizing children from and thwarting reunification efforts with the children's parents.

== See also ==
- Adoption 2002
- Uniform Adoption Act
