= Adoption in Australia =

Adoption in Australia deals with the adoption process in the various parts of Australia, whereby a person assumes or acquires the permanent, legal status of parenthood in relation to a child under the age of 18 in place of the child's birth or biological parents. Australia classifies adoptions as local adoptions (placement within the country), and intercountry adoptions (adoption of children born overseas). Known child adoptions (adoption by relatives, stepparents or carers) are a form of local adoptions.

Adoptions in Australia are handled by state and territorial government agencies or approved adoption agencies. It is unlawful to arrange a private adoption, though foreign adoptions may be recognised. Government departments and agencies responsible for adoption include Adoption Services in Queensland, Department for Child Protection in South Australia, and the Department of Human Services in Victoria.

When an adoption is completed, the birth parents (also referred to as natural parents) no longer have any legal rights over the child. The adopted child becomes a full member of the adopting family, taking their surname and assuming the same rights and privileges as a birth child, including the right of inheritance. A new birth certificate is issued, in the case of local adoptions. The adopted child also has the same position as a birth child in relation to the extended family of the adopting parents, for example with laws prohibiting incestuous sexual relationships or prohibiting marriages.

== Legal framework ==
Adoptions in Australia are regulated by legislation and regulations of each State and Territory, which govern all adoptions arranged in that State and Territory. In April 2018, the Northern Territory was the last jurisdiction within Australia that passed a bill to allow both same-sex couples and unmarried different-sex couples to legally adopt children.

The current State and Territory Adoption Acts are:

- Australian Capital Territory: Adoption Act 1993
- New South Wales: Adoption Act 2000
- Northern Territory: Adoption of Children Act 1994
- Queensland: Adoption Act 2009 and Adoption Regulation 2009
- South Australia: Adoption Act 1988 and Adoption Regulations 2004
- Tasmania: Adoption Act 1988
- Victoria: Adoption Act 1984
- Western Australia: Adoption Act 1994

Australia is a party to the Hague Adoption Convention which came into force in Australia on 1 December 1998, and has been implemented by amendments to the Family Law Act 1975 and the passing of the Family Law (Hague Convention on Intercountry Adoption) Regulations 1998. The Australian Citizenship Act 2007 simplified the process of obtaining Australian citizenship for children who were adopted overseas in accordance with the Hague Adoption Convention. Intercountry adoptions conform with the principles of the convention.

State and territory governments are in charge of processing inter-country adoptions, but eligibility requirements widely differ in relation to partner relationship status, age, citizenship and health, and there are also federal responsibilities. Each foreign country would also have its own eligibility criteria for the adoption of its children.

=== Known child adoptions ===
Family law in Australia with regards to children is based on what is considered to be in the best interest of the child and families. Family laws contain a strong preference for retaining ties to biological parents, and a general presumption against making a known adoption order because an adoption order severs the legal relationship between the child and one of the child's birth parents. Due to the serious consequences of an adoption order, all stepparent adoption laws contain a strong preference for dealing with new parenting arrangements through a parenting order rather than an adoption order. Stepparents and other carers may apply to the Family Court of Australia for a parenting order, as 'other people significant to the care, welfare and development' of the child. It provides an important "status quo" if the birth mother were to die, so, for example, other family members could not come and take the child.

=== Same sex couple adoptions ===
Adoption for same-sex couples is currently legally available in all of Australia since April 2018.

Western Australia became the first Australian state to allow same-sex adoptions when its Labor government passed the Acts Amendment (Lesbian and Gay Law Reform) Act, 2002 which amended the Adoption Act, 1994 (WA). This allowed same-sex couples to adopt in accordance with criteria that assesses the suitability of couples and individuals to be parents, regardless of sexual orientation. The Northern Territory in April 2018 was the last jurisdiction of Australia to legally allow same sex couples and unmarried heterosexual couples to adopt children.

Australia's first legal gay adoption, by two men, occurred in Western Australia in June 2007. Subsequently, on 2 August 2007, the federal government under Prime Minister John Howard announced it would legislate to stop same-sex couples adopting a child from overseas, and would further not recognise adopted children of same-sex couples. The federal Coalition's proposed Family Law (Same Sex Adoption) Bill would amend the 1975 Family Law Act and override state and territory laws that currently cover international adoptions. The bill was due to be introduced in the spring 2007 session of parliament, but was taken off the agenda following the Coalition's defeat at the 2007 federal election.

Both New South Wales since 2010 and Victoria since 2016, legal adoption services within these states have religious exemptions. That means religious organizations can technically still do not have to legally include single people, unmarried heterosexual couples or any same-sex couples married or unmarried within their religious organization adoption services.

=== Single parent adoptions ===
Since April 2018, most Australian jurisdictions legally allow single people to adopt children, except in Victoria, South Australia and the Northern Territory.

== Intercountry adoptions ==
Intercountry adoption in Australia first began in 1975 towards the end of the Vietnam War when 292 Vietnamese orphans were brought to Australia in an American organised evacuation from Vietnam of Asian-American orphans, called 'Operation Babylift'. An average of 330 intercountry adoptions were finalised each year for the ten years between 1998 and 2008. The rate of children being adopted from China has increased faster than any other country from 0.3% in 1999/2000 to 30.9% in 2006/07. In 2007/2008, there were only 270 children adopted from other countries by Australian parents, the majority of the children coming from, in descending order, China (63 children, 23.3%), South Korea (47 children, 17.4%), Philippines (41 children, 15.2%) and Ethiopia (35 children, 13.0%). By 2011/12, the number of intercountry adoptions had dropped to 149, and 129 in 2012/13.

The Australian Government Attorney-General's Department has primary responsibility for developing and maintaining intercountry adoption arrangements with other countries. This responsibility is shared with the State and Territory authorities, which assess applications, facilitate adoptions, provide advice and assistance, and provide post-placement support and supervision. Applicants must meet the eligibility requirements set by the Australian State or Territory in which the application is being lodged, as well as the eligibility criteria of the overseas country of the adoptive child. Intercountry adoption can be a lengthy process, usually taking at least two years in Australia, requiring multiple assessments of the continued suitability of prospective parents.

Intercountry adoption practices are in accordance with the principles of the Hague Convention on Intercountry Adoption, which came into force in Australia on 1 December 1998. As at August 2009, Australia had open adoption programs with Bolivia, Chile, China, Colombia, Ethiopia, Fiji, Hong Kong, India, Lithuania, Philippines, South Korea, Sri Lanka, Taiwan, and Thailand. Most of the countries with which Australia has direct adoption programs are also parties to the Hague Adoption Convention, the exceptions being Hong Kong, Ethiopia and Taiwan. Countries with which adoption programs have closed include Costa Rica, Guatemala, Mexico and Romania. In 2012, Australia closed the adoption program with Ethiopia. It did so at a time when no Ethiopian children would be disadvantaged as no Ethiopian children were available for adoption by Australian parents.

== Statistics ==
There has been a substantial decline in the number of adoptions in Australia since the early 1970s. In 1971/72 there were 9,798 adoptions, which declined to 668 in 1995/96.

A report by the Australian Bureau of Statistics attributes this decline to the introduction of welfare for single mothers, increased legal access to termination of pregnancy, family planning services, access to child care and improved participation of women in the workforce. Forced adoption of tens of thousands of Aboriginals and the children of single mothers continued until the early 1980s.

As the table below demonstrates, Australia has a significantly lower rate of adoption than the United States and the United Kingdom:

Country	Adoptions	Live births	Adoption/live birth ratio	Notes
Australia	502 (2003/2004)	254,000 (2004)	2 per 1000 live births	Includes all adoptions
England & Wales	4,764 (2006)	669,601(2006)	7 per 1000 live births	Includes all adoption orders in England and Wales
United States	approx 127,000 (2001)	4,021,725 (2002)	30 per 1000 live births	The number of adoptions is reported to be constant since 1987.

Low rates of local adoptions are attributed to the low number of children who need placement. Low rates of international adoptions are attributed to long wait times (from two to as much as eight years) and high cost (up to $40,000). The following table shows the most recent adoption figures, from the Australian Institute of Health and Welfare:

	2005/06	2006/07	2007/08	2008/09
Intercountry adoptions	421	405	270	269
Local adoptions	60	59	70	68
'Known-child' adoptions	95	104	100	104
Totals	576	568	440	441

In 2012/13, there was a total of 339 children adopted nationally, arranged through the eight administrations.

== Stolen generations ==
The Stolen Generations (also stolen children) refers to those children of Australian Aboriginal and Torres Strait Islander descent who were removed from their families by the Australian Federal and State government agencies and church missions, under acts of their respective parliaments. The removals occurred in the period between approximately 1869 and 1969, although in some places children were still being taken in the 1970s.

The earliest introduction of child removal to legislation is recorded in the Victorian Aboriginal Protection Act 1869. The Central Board for the Protection of Aborigines had been advocating such powers since 1860, and the passage of the Act gave the colony of Victoria a wide suite of powers over Aboriginal and 'half-caste' persons, including the forcible removal of children, especially 'at risk' girls. By 1950, similar policies and legislation had been adopted by other states and territories. According to the Bringing Them Home inquiry into the forced separation of indigenous children from their families, less than 17% of the children were adopted. The majority of these adoptions occurred after 1950 when authorities began promoting the fostering and adoption of Aboriginal children by white parents.

== Traditional Torres Strait Islander adoptions ==
A traditional cultural practice by Torres Strait Islander peoples, known as kupai omasker, allows adoption of a child by a relative or community member for a range of reasons. The reasons differ depending on which of the many Torres Islander cultures the person belongs to, with one example being "where a family requires an heir to carry on the important role of looking after land or being the caretaker of land". Other reasons might relate to "the care and responsibility of relationships between generations".

There had been a problem in Queensland law, where such adoptions are not legally recognised by the state's Succession Act 1981, with one issue being that adopted children are not able to take on the surname of their adoptive parents. On 17 July 2020 the Queensland Government introduced a bill in parliament to legally recognise the practice. The bill was passed as the Meriba Omasker Kaziw Kazipa Act 2020 ("For Our Children's Children") on 8 September 2020.

== Changing attitudes ==
While the first adoption legislation in Australia in the 1920s fostered relatively "open" adoptions, a second wave of legislation passed in the 1960s had emphasised the importance of a "clean break" from birth parents and enshrined the principle of secrecy around the adoptive status of children, who were to be raised by their adoptive parents "as if born to them". This principle was meant to provide adoptive parents with heirs without fear of stigma or interference from the biological parent/s, but also operated to allow the unmarried mother, her child, and her family, to be shielded from the shame of an illegitimate birth.

The number of adoptions has decreased since the 1970s. This is largely due to the increase in social acceptance of single parent families and de facto relationships. Government benefits for single parents and improved access to contraception and abortion are also important reasons for this trend.

Subsequent revelations decades later of the history of the treatment of "removed" children, whether indigenous, white Australian, or the British children who travelled to Australia in imperial forced migration schemes well into the twentieth-century, had a profound impact on public perceptions of adoption. The notion of "coming home", mobilised with great effect by indigenous Australians to account for their experiences of separation from family into institutions or adoption, came to stand for the adoptive experience generally. This concept stigmatised adoptions in general as entailing loss, removal from roots, and pain while at the same time idealised the birth family, minimising if not shutting out the role and experiences of the adoptive family.

Recognition of the damaging effects of previous adoption policies had burgeoned in the 1970s and 1980s. Beginning in the mid-1970s, all Australian states and territories reviewed adoption legislation and embarked on initially cautious reversals of previous (secretive) practices throughout the 1980s. National Adoption Conferences, convened in Australia in 1976, 1978 and 1982, brought together people affected by adoption with professionals and researchers. These conferences served as important for activism and agitation on adoption law reform. Workers in the field began to tend towards the view that children should be with their biological parents where possible. Sociologist Rosemary Pringle suggested as late as 2002 that adoption in Australia had lost virtually all social policy credibility.

Then, in 2005 and again in 2007, in two significant reports from the House of Representatives Standing Committee on Family and Human Services, adoption appeared to reemerge on the political agenda as a viable social policy. The 2005 report endorsed not only intercountry adoption, but suggested that adoption, rather than foster care and other out-of-home-care, might also be in the best interests of many Australian-born children. It also reversed the Australian tendency towards non-interventionism in family matters. The Standing Committee stated that it had concluded it was "unequivocally in support of intercountry adoptions as a legitimate way to give a loving family environment to children from overseas who may have been abandoned or given up for adoption". This is contrasted with the negative attitudes to adoption found within the state and territory welfare departments responsible for processing adoption applications at the time. These attitudes ranged "from indifference to hostility". In December 2013, NSW family and community services minister Pru Goward said adoption can improve lives, saying "How can we hope to break the cycle of intergenerational disadvantage if we do not begin by giving each of these children a safe and loving home for life?"

== See also ==
- Family Law Act 1975
- Foster care in Australia
- Forgotten Australians
- Stolen generations
- Follow the Rabbit-Proof Fence — a novel and film about the kidnapping and forced adoption, as wards of the state, of mixed-blood Indigenous children in Western Australia
