= Origins Canada =

Canadian nonprofit organization

Origins Canada (full name: Origins Canada: Supporting Those Separated by Adoption) is a Canadian federal non profit organization providing support and resources to people who have been separated from a family member by adoption practices, including natural parents, persons adopted, and other family members. It was founded in 2002 as a branch of Origins International, which is based in New South Wales, Australia.

Origins Canada provides services including an online search-and-reunion registry, support groups, peer support for those separated by adoption, and a first-contact service for reuniting families.

== Aims and Objectives ==
The stated Aims and Objectives of the organization are:

- SUPPORT: To provide confidential support and resources to those separated from their families by adoption in safe and secure environments.
- EDUCATION:To provide resources and education for those considering adoption and to advise governments, mental health professionals and others with respect to adoption policies, practices, and adoption trauma.
- REUNION: To assist in the reunion of family members separated by adoption.
- REDRESS: To seek acknowledgement, validation, accountability and redress for illegal and unethical adoption practices.
- RESEARCH: To undertake and promote research into adoption policies and practices past and present.
- REFORM: To encourage and promote legislative, social and administrative reforms that honour and respect the mother-child bond, support the preservation of natural families, meet the needs of those already separated by adoption, and abolish reproductive exploitation.

The organization advocates for a federal inquiry/committee to investigate illegal, unethical and human rights abuses in adoption practice in Canada. A sister organization Origins Australia, obtained two State Inquiries, and finally, a National Senate Inquiry which culminated in an apology to those separated by adoption from the Prime Minister of Australia on March 21, 2013, for adoption policies which included illegal and unethical practices as well as human rights abuses. The policies and practices uncovered by the Australian Inquiry mirror those experienced by over 350,000 women in Canada systematically separated from their children by adoption during the post WWII decades because of their unmarried status. In October 2013 Origins Canada hosted a meeting with MPs in Ottawa to educate and formally request a Senate Inquiry/Committee to Investigate. A meeting was held on June 15, 2012, with the major Canadian churches at United Church Headquarters entitled "A Way Forward". In attendance were high level executives of every major Canadian church involved in Maternity Homes in Canada including Catholic, Presbyterian, Anglican, United, and Salvation Army.

The United Church of Canada is developing a liturgy for those separated by adoption in conjunction with Origins Canada.

Currently only four provinces and one territory have open adoption records: Ontario, B.C., Alberta, Newfoundland and Yukon Territory.

In 2010, Origins Canada made a presentation to the Toronto and East York Community Council supporting the preservation of the heritage building at 450 Pape Avenue. For part of its history, this building was operated by the Salvation Army as a maternity facility for the confinement of unwed pregnant mothers.

On May 16, 2011, Origins Canada, represented by its executive director, Valerie Andrews, presented to the Ontario Legislature's Standing Committee on Social Policy, regarding Bill 179, "Building Families and Supporting Youth to be Successful Act, 2011." The presentation raised concerns that key stakeholders who would be affected by the act were not consulted about it, and that the rights of natural parents would be jeopardized, with the law permitting babies to be apprehended at birth, only 30 days before the child becomes available for adoption by a Children's Aid Society, no guarantee of notice being given to the parents of the adoption hearing, and no means for the parents to contest the adoption.
