= Uniform Adoption Act =

The Uniform Adoption Act (1994) is a model law (uniform act) proposed by the U.S. Uniform Law Commission. It attempts to "be a comprehensive and uniform state adoption code that:

1. is consistent with relevant federal constitutional and statutory law
2. delineates the legal requirements and consequences of different kinds of adoption
3. promotes the integrity and finality of adoptions while discouraging "trafficking" in minors
4. respects the choices made by the parties to an adoption about how much confidentiality or openness they prefer in their relations with each other, subject, however, to judicial protection of the adoptee's welfare
5. promotes the interest of minor children in being raised by individuals who are committed to, and capable of, caring for them."

== Contents of the Act ==
The model Act contains the following provisions. Note that states will generally modify the text of model laws when they are adopted.

ARTICLE 1. GENERAL PROVISIONS

§ 1-101 Definitions
§ 1-102 Who may adopt or be adopted
§ 1-103 Name of adoptee after adoption
§ 1-104 Legal relationship between adoptee and adoptive parent after adoption
§ 1-105 Legal relationship between adoptee and former parent after adoption
§ 1-106 Other rights of adoptee
§ 1-107 Proceedings subject to the Indian Child Welfare Act
§ 1-108 Recognition of adoption decree in another jurisdiction

ARTICLE 2. ADOPTION OF MINORS

PART 1. PLACEMENT OF MINORS FOR ADOPTION
§ 2-101 Who may place minor for adoption
§ 2-102 Direct placement for adoption by parent or guardian
§ 2-103 Placement for adoption by agency
§ 2-104 Preferences for placement when agency places a minor
§ 2-105 Recruitment of adoptive parents by agency
§ 2-106 Disclosure of information on background
§ 2-107 Interstate placement
§ 2-108 Intercountry placement

PART 2. PREPLACEMENT EVALUATION
§ 2-201 Preplacement evaluation required
§ 2-202 Preplacement evaluator
§ 2-203 Timing and content of preplacement evaluation
§ 2-204 Determining suitability to be adoptive parent
§ 2-205 Filing and copies of preplacement evaluation
§ 2-206 Review of evaluation
§ 2-207 Action by department

PART 3. TRANSFER OF PHYSICAL CUSTODY OF MINOR BY HEALTH CARE FACILITY FOR PURPOSES OF ADOPTION
§ 2-301 "Health-care facility" defined
§ 2-302 Authorization to transfer physical custody
§ 2-303 Reports to department
§ 2-304 Action by department

PART 4. CONSENT TO AND RELINQUISHMENT FOR ADOPTION
§ 2-401 Persons whose consent required
§ 2-402 Persons whose consent not required
§ 2-403 Individuals who may relinquish minor
§ 2-404 Time and prerequisites for execution of consent or relinquishment
§ 2-405 Procedure for execution of consent or relinquishment
§ 2-406 Content of consent or relinquishment
§ 2-407 Consequences of consent or relinquishment
§ 2-408 Revocation of consent
§ 2-409 Revocation of relinquishment

ARTICLE 3. GENERAL PROCEDURE FOR ADOPTION OF MINORS

PART 1. JURISDICTION AND VENUE
§ 3-101 Jurisdiction
§ 3-102 Venue

PART 2. GENERAL PROCEDURAL PROVISIONS
§ 3-201 Appointment of lawyer or guardian ad litem
§ 3-202 No right to jury
§ 3-203 Confidentiality of proceedings
§ 3-204 Custody during pendency of proceeding
§ 3-205 Removal of adoptee from State

PART 3. PETITION FOR ADOPTION OF MINOR
§ 3-301 Standing to petition to adopt
§ 3-302 Time for filing petition
§ 3-303 Caption of petition
§ 3-304 Content of petition
§ 3-305 Required documents

PART 4. NOTICE OF PENDENCY OF PROCEEDING
§ 3-401 Service of notice
§ 3-402 Content of notice
§ 3-403 Manner and effect of service
§ 3-404 Investigation and notice to unknown father
§ 3-405 Waiver of notice

PART 5. PETITION TO TERMINATE RELATIONSHIP BETWEEN PARENT AND CHILD
§ 3-501 Authorization
§ 3-502 Timing and content of petition
§ 3-503 Service of petition and notice
§ 3-504 Grounds for terminating relationship
§ 3-505 Effect of order granting petition
§ 3-506 Effect of order denying petition

PART 6. EVALUATION OF ADOPTEE AND PROSPECTIVE ADOPTIVE PARENT
§ 3-601 Evaluation during proceeding for adoption
§ 3-602 Content of evaluation
§ 3-603 Time and filing of evaluation

PART 7. DISPOSITIONAL HEARING: DECREE OF ADOPTION
§ 3-701 Time for hearing on petition
§ 3-702 Disclosure of fees and charges
§ 3-703 Granting petition for adoption
§ 3-704 Denial of petition for adoption
§ 3-705 Decree of adoption
§ 3-706 Finality of decree
§ 3-707 Challenges to decree

PART 8. BIRTH CERTIFICATE
§ 3-801 Report of adoption
§ 3-802 Issuance of new birth certificate

ARTICLE 4. ADOPTION OF MINOR STEPCHILD BY STEPPARENT
§ 4-101 Other provisions applicable to adoption of stepchild
§ 4-102 Standing to adopt minor stepchild
§ 4-103 Legal consequences of adoption of stepchild
§ 4-104 Consent to adoption
§ 4-105 Content of consent by stepparent's spouse
§ 4-106 Content of consent by minor's other parent
§ 4-107 Content of consent by other persons
§ 4-108 Petition to adopt
§ 4-109 Required documents
§ 4-110 Notice of pendency of proceeding
§ 4-111 Evaluation of stepparent
§ 4-112 Dispositional hearing; decree of adoption
§ 4-113 Visitation agreement and order

ARTICLE 5. ADOPTION OF ADULTS AND EMANCIPATED MINORS
§ 5-101 Who may adopt adult or emancipated minor
§ 5-102 Legal consequences of adoption
§ 5-103 Consent to adoption
§ 5-104 Jurisdiction and venue
§ 5-105 Petition for adoption
§ 5-106 Notice and time of hearing
§ 5-107 Dispositional hearing
§ 5-108 Decree of adoption

ARTICLE 6. RECORDS OF ADOPTION PROCEEDING: RETENTION, CONFIDENTIALITY, AND ACCESS
§ 6-101 Records defined
§ 6-102 Records confidential, court records sealed
§ 6-103 Release of nonidentifying information
§ 6-104 Disclosure of identifying information
§ 6-105 Action for disclosure of information
§ 6-106 Statewide registry
§ 6-107 Release of original birth certificate
§ 6-108 Certificate of adoption
§ 6-109 Disclosure authorized in course of employment
§ 6-110 Fee for services

ARTICLE 7. PROHIBITED AND PERMISSIBLE ACTIVITIES IN CONNECTION WITH ADOPTION
§ 7-101 Prohibited activities in placement
§ 7-102 Unlawful payments related to adoption
§ 7-103 Lawful payments related to adoption
§ 7-104 Charges by agency
§ 7-105 Failure to disclose information
§ 7-106 Unauthorized disclosure of information
§ 7-107 Action by department
ARTICLE 8. MISCELLANEOUS PROVISIONS
§ 8-101 Uniformity of application and construction
§ 8-102 Short title
§ 8-103 Severability clause
§ 8-104 Effective date
§ 8-105 Repeals
§ 8-106 Transitional provisions

== History ==
The National Conference of Commissioners on Uniform State Laws produced two earlier versions of the Uniform Adoption Act, in 1953 and 1969. The 1994 Act is a complete revision of these previous versions. The 1994 version of the Uniform Adoption Act was drafted across five years, beginning in 1989.

== State legislation ==
Vermont has enacted the Uniform Adoption Act (1994) in Title 15A of the Vermont Statutes.

== Controversy ==
The Uniform Law Commissioners recognized the controversy created by the Uniform Adoption Act in their Legislative Summary, noting that the Act "contains many studied compromises in the effort to be as fair as possible to all parties, but there are no illusions about the satisfaction that the Uniform Adoption Act (1994) will provide to many people with committed interest in adoption issues."

Indeed, attempts to adopt the UAA have been met with protest by many adoption advocates. Critics dub the UAA the "Evil Act", alleging that the Act prevents adoptees from gathering sufficient information about their biological parents by sealing adoption-related court records for 99 years (see closed adoption and open adoption). It would also impose heavy fines and possible jail time for adoptees who try to seek their birth families. Critics also allege that the Act provides insufficient revocation periods and does not properly require the notification of a non-spousal father.

== See also ==
- Adoption and Safe Families Act
