= Adoption Information Disclosure Act =

Canadian law regarding adoptions

Legislative Assembly of Ontario
- Long title: An Act respecting the disclosure of information and records to adopted persons and birth parents
- Assented to: November 3, 2005

Legislative history
- Bill citation: Bill 183
- Introduced by: Sandra Pupatello, Minister of Community and Social Services
- First reading: March 29, 2005
- Second reading: May 3, 2005
- Third reading: November 1, 2005
- Status: Current legislation

The Adoption Information Disclosure Act, formally An Act respecting the disclosure of information and records to adopted persons and birth parents, also known as Bill 183, is an Ontario, Canada, law regarding the disclosure of information between parties involved in adoptions.

The Act was passed by the Legislative Assembly of Ontario in 2005 and put into force on September 17, 2007. Significant sections of it were quashed just two days later in a ruling by Judge Edward Belobaba of the Ontario Superior Court.

On November 13, 2007, the Ontario government announced that instead of appealing Belobaba's decision, it would opt to amend the act to contain a universal disclosure veto. It accordingly introduced the Access to Adoption Records Act on December 10, 2007, which passed third reading in May 2008 and took effect in September 2008.

== Background ==
From 1927 until the mid-1980s, certain measures existed in Ontario to preserve anonymity between birth parents and adoptees; this was consistent with adoption practice elsewhere in Canada and the United States at that time.

The practice was reduced but not eliminated for current adoptions, but there remained the question of what to do with existing adoption records: how does the right to information for either party compare with the obligation of honouring past commitments to privacy?

Adoptees and birth parents could apply to be put onto the government-run Adoption Disclosure Register, but the process was long, the resources for active searches for birth relatives were limited, and success was not guaranteed.

NDP MPP Marilyn Churley introduced several bills into the Legislative Assembly starting in the late 1990s. Her strong stance for open records was personally motivated, as she had placed a child for adoption years earlier and was later reunited with him. None of these bills were passed.

== Bill 183 ==
In 2005, Sandra Pupatello introduced Bill 183, the Adoption Information Disclosure Act. It permits the disclosure, to an adult adoptee, of that adoptee's original full name, birth certificate, and the names of birth parents. To birth parents, it permits the disclosure of an adoptee's legal (adoptive) name.

The bill was supported by the Ontario Association of Children's Aid Societies. It was criticized by others, many of whom were opposed to its lack of a general disclosure veto (see below). Ontario Privacy Commissioner Ann Cavoukian stated that the bill was insufficiently respectful of implicit or explicit promises of anonymity made to birth mothers in the past. Several adoptees including Denbigh Patton and birth parents campaigned actively against the bill, Patton arguing that he alone should decide when, if ever, to release his identity to his birth parents.

Bill 183 was passed 68 to 19 by the Legislative Assembly of Ontario on November 1, 2005. All 19 votes against the bill came from the opposition Conservatives, who objected to the lack of a disclosure veto provision.

== Disclosure veto question ==
Unlike several other retroactive adoption disclosure laws in Canada and unlike any of Churley's proposals, Bill 183 did not have any universal "disclosure veto" provision. Such a provision typically allows a party to issue, within a fixed time period after the law's introduction, a request that his or her identifying information not be released.

The bill did provide a "contact veto", similar to a restraining order whereby a concerned party can request not to be contacted by his or her birth relative, but this does not prevent the release of the person's name.

As well, Bill 183 did have a restricted disclosure veto. Adoptees or birth parents could apply to a tribunal to prohibit the release of their identifying information in cases where they can demonstrate their safety is at stake.

== Court challenge ==
A group of adoptees and "birth parents", opposed to the new law, promised upon the bill's passage to mount a constitutional challenge to it, and retained noted Toronto lawyer Clayton Ruby for this purpose.

COAR (Coalition for Open Adoption Records) obtained amicus curiae status to put forward their side in this court case, supporting the position of the Ontario government. The presiding judge, Justice Edward Belobaba, stated that "I'm not ready to buy those three words: right to privacy," and noted earlier that the lawyers mounting the constitutional challenge on behalf of three adoptees and a birth father "have the tougher job."

Belobaba ultimately sided with the challengers, writing that the act breached the privacy provisions granted by the Charter of Rights and Freedoms. He noted that while the Charter protected the privacy rights of the challengers he did not see similar rights for those searching for information saying "...this is not a case where we have competing Charter-protected rights. The applicants' right to liberty under s. 7 has been breached. The rights of the searching adoptees or birth parents to the disclosure of confidential adoption information, although important and heartfelt, are not protected by s. 7 or any other provision of the Charter."

Advocates of open records continue to express concern that in the wake of increased security measures, many documents relating to immigration, passports and travel require presentation of a long form birth certificate, which they say is not available to Ontario adoptees. They claim that for adult adoptees who are unsuccessful in obtaining long form birth certificates, travel, employment and immigration can be in some circumstances effectively prohibited.

Those on the other side of the debate continue to express relief at the inclusion of a non-disclosure veto in the proposed new law, saying it would strike a reasonable balance between the right of adoptees to know their parentage, the desire of "birth parents" to learn the fate of their progeny and the right of adult adoptees and others to control the uses of private information held in government records.

On November 14, 2007, the Ontario government declared it would introduce a bill to amend the Act to include a universal disclosure veto.
