= Dave Thomas Foundation for Adoption =

Non-profit organization in the USA

- Founded: 1992
- Founder: Dave Thomas
- Purpose: Foster care adoption
- Headquarters: Dublin, Ohio
- Region served: United States, Canada
- Key people: Rita Soronen (President and CEO)
- Budget: Revenue: $34,486,927; Expenses: $26,895,507 (FYE June 2017)
- Website: davethomasfoundation.org

The Dave Thomas Foundation for Adoption is a nonprofit public charity dedicated to finding permanent homes for children waiting in foster care in the United States and Canada. Created in 1992 by Wendy's founder Dave Thomas, who was adopted, the Foundation implements evidence-based, results-driven national service programs, foster care adoption awareness campaigns and innovative grantmaking.

== The Foundation ==
Located in Dublin, Ohio, the Dave Thomas Foundation for Adoption is the only public nonprofit charity in the United States that is focused exclusively on foster care adoption.

Through its Wendy’s Wonderful Kids program, the Foundation provides funding to adoption agencies to hire recruiters who implement an evidence-based, child-focused recruitment model. This model has been proven to be up to three times more effective at finding adoptive homes for children who are most at risk of aging out of foster care, including teenagers, children with special needs and siblings.

The Foundation is led by President & CEO Rita Soronen, who has been working on behalf of abused, neglected and vulnerable children for more than 30 years. Previously, Soronen served as the Executive Director of Court Appointed Special Advocates (CASA) of Franklin County, Ohio. She is also a founding board member and past Vice President of the Congressional Coalition on Adoption Institute and is a current member of the advisory board. In addition, Soronen serves as a member of the National Court Appointed Special Advocate/Guardian ad Litem (CASA/GAL) Association for Children’s board of trustees.

The Foundation is working to expand its Wendy’s Wonderful Kids program to serve more children in foster care, with financial support from its community of donors, including The Wendy’s Company. As Wendy’s charity of choice, employees, suppliers and customers help to advance the Foundation’s mission through events and in-restaurant campaigns, such as Frosty Key Tags, Halloween Boo! Books and coin canisters.

== Assets ==
As of 2019, the Dave Thomas Foundation for Adoption had total assets of $50,123,644.

=== Funding details ===
Funding details as of 2019:
Revenue and support as of 2019: $39,807,242
1. Contributions (57.6%)
2. Donated broadcasting (21.0%)
3. Government contracts (14.9%)
4. Investment income (3.10%)
5. In-kind contributions (0.10%)
6. Interest income (1.10%)
7. Net assets released from restrictions (2.20%)
Expenses as of 2019: $32,858,710
1. Grants and allocations (53.4%)
2. Donated broadcasting (25.5%)
3. Other program expenses (12.0%)
4. Fundraising (4.70%)
5. General and administrative (4.40%)
