= Family reunion =

Congregation of members of an extended family

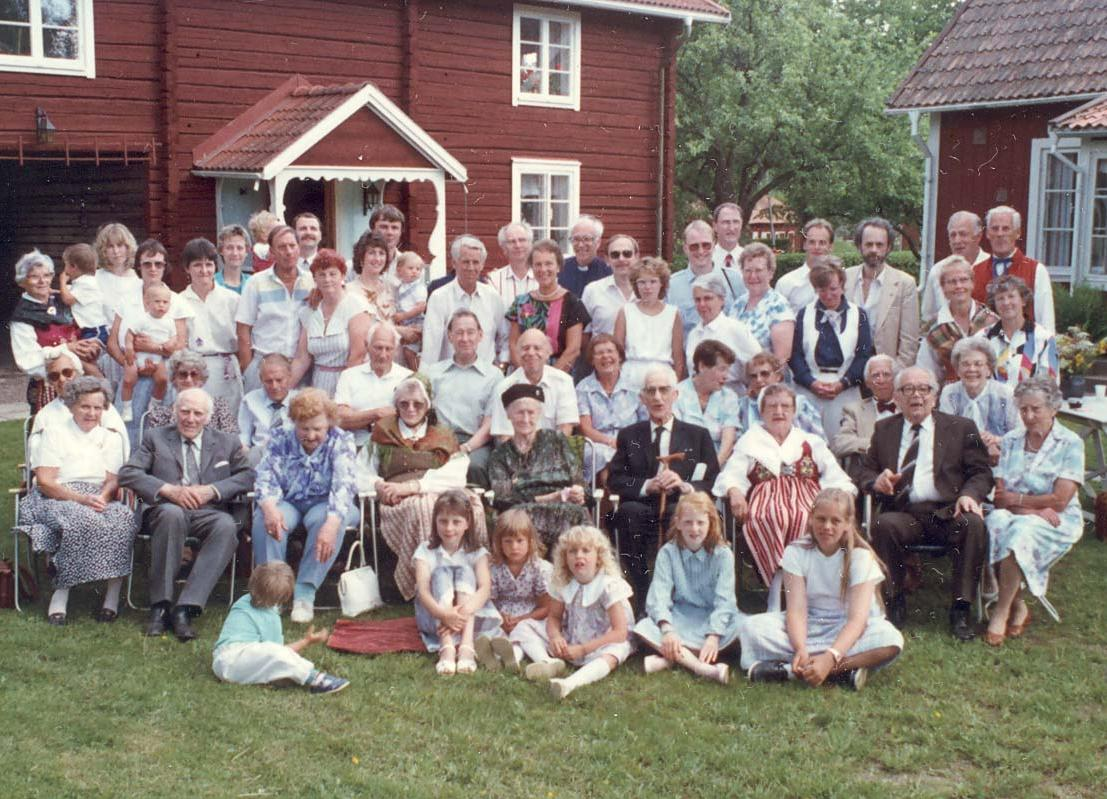
1988 Swedish-American family reunion in Borlänge of people descending from a common ancestor born in 1776

A family reunion is an occasion when many members of an extended family congregate. Sometimes reunions are held regularly, for example on the same date of every year.

A typical family reunion will assemble for a meal, some recreation and discussion. The older attendees are generally grandparents, parents, siblings or first cousins while the youngest may be second, third or fourth cousins to each other, all other can be self-pollinating family members at fifth cousins. It is also not uncommon for regular family reunions to be sponsored by family organizations or family associations centered on a more distant common ancestor (often referred to as "ancestral family organizations") or a commonly shared surname ("single surname family organizations").

== Family reunion programs ==
Family reunion programs are sponsored by Red Cross organizations. See the List of Red Cross and Red Crescent Societies. The International Committee of the Red Cross (ICRC) leads the international movement, which has special responsibilities under international humanitarian law.

== Adoption reunion movements ==
Many adults using an adoption reunion registry are able to locate parents and siblings. Adoption Reunion groups offer search and support guidance for birth parents and adoptees. Adoption Reunion organizations help to uphold adoptee rights and support adoption reform. According to TRIADOPTION® Library which kept records on adoption search and reunion beginning in the 1970s, Jean Paton formed Orphan Voyage back in 1954 and is considered the grandmother of the adoption reunion movement. ALMA (Adoptees Liberty Movement Association) was formed by Florence Fisher in New York City in 1972, ISRR (International Soundex Reunion Registry) in 1975, CUB (Concerned United Birthparents) in 1976, and dozens more sprung up around the US, Canada and Australia. By 1985 there were over 500 search and support organizations worldwide. The adoption reunion movement grew rapidly from grass roots local organizations coming together under forming the AAC (American Adoption Congress) in 1979 at a conference held in Washington, DC. Groups from each region were instrumental in finding ways to help their members reunite with their birth families and surrendered/relinquished children.

One of the early groups was Yesterday's Children in Illinois founded by Donna Cullom. They were instrumental in filing the first class action suit in 1974 on behalf of adoptees having access to their original records and birth certificates. In Canada, Parent Finders was formed by Joan Vanstone. Philadelphia Forum, Adoptees In Search, Search Triad, Operation Identity and so many others held meetings, gave support, assisted in search and offered education in their communities. Like them WARM (Washington Adoption Reunion Movement) was a non-profit organization providing search, reunion and educational resources and support to the adult adoption community. WARM maintains a collection of Orphan memorials dedicated to adoptees and birthparents who died before being reunited.

== National and international family history societies ==
Many reunions are made possible by family history societies. The Federation of Family History Societies (FFHS) is an international organisation based in the UK which represents, advises and supports over 220 family history societies. The Federation of East European Family History Societies (FEEFHS) was organized in 1992 as an umbrella organization that promotes family research. The Canadian Federation of Genealogical (CanFed) and Family History Societies work with Canadian born families.

== International family reunification ==
Family reunification for third-country nationals remains a politically charged issue. The ICCPR (Art. 12.4) states openly the right of each person to enter the country of their nationality. This statement has been open to a variety of interpretations. Family reunification has become a controversial humanitarian and human rights issue as well as a much-debated immigration policy issue. In 2015 North Korea planned a programme of family reunion with South Korea.

== Genealogy societies ==
The purpose of genealogical societies is to form a community of researchers and help its members create a library of families history resources. FGS was founded in 1976 and represents the members of more than 600 genealogical societies. Organizations such as the African American Genealogical Society of Northern California assist family members to connect the branches of the family tree using genealogy and Internet resources.

== Traditional family reunion activities ==
Traditional family reunion activities include an afternoon luncheon or early evening dinner and program featuring music, song, poetry reading, history recitals, honorary recognition of elders, community contributions and educational achievements.

Historic skits Reenactments that highlight pivotal points in a family's history. Participants are introduced to the art of developing a timeline as well as period research with a focus on costume design, customs, dialogue and social, economic and technological developments.

Story telling An art that brings to life tales of ancestors and their accomplishments. Along with stories of legends of the past, life lessons are taught. The meaning behind family traditions is shared while relaying family history factoids.

Genealogy tours Takes the family on a tour of important genealogical hot spots, including the family homestead, the towns in which the family settled, the jobs they held, machines they worked, markets they traded, and streets they walked, as well as social activities they immersed themselves into.

Genealogy presentations A Presentation of historic documents and vintage artifacts that identify timelines, economic status, historic events and locations of ancestors.

== Annual proclamations and observances ==
Family Reunion Month A Proclamation in 1985 To raise awareness of a growing trend of runaway children and newly formed organizations to help reunite families of runaways the US Congress, by House Joint Resolution 64, designated the period between Mother's Day, May 12, and Father's Day, June 16, 1985, as Family Reunion Month and authorized and requested the President to issue a proclamation in observance of this period.

National Family Reunion Month While some commercial enterprises have dubbed August as National Family Reunion Month many social groups including churches observe National Family Reunion Month in the month of July.

Annual Family Reunion Planning Month A family awareness group with a focus on genealogy and traditional family reunion planning established Annual Family Reunion Planning Month in November. Mark A. Askew, group Administrator and Founder, announced Family Reunion Planning Month to international reunion planners-group members, family magazines, corporations and schools. (See Fimark's Family Reunion Planner Guidebook and Keepsake.)

== See also ==
- Family
- Class reunion
