= Emma May Vilardi =

- Born: Emma May Sutton; June 23, 1922; Kansas City, Missouri
- Died: July 9, 1990 (aged 68)

Emma May Vilardi (née Sutton; June 23, 1922 – July 9, 1990) was an American writer and adoption reform activist. She authored Heritage and Legacy: Town of Kearny, New Jersey in 1967 and a booklet titled Handbook for the Search in 1973 which was originally distributed to members of ALMA Society and then later by TRIADOPTION® Publications. She also wrote a number of unpublished children’s stories.

== Early and personal life ==
Emma was born Emma May Sutton in Kansas City, Missouri in 1922 and died in Carson City, Nevada in 1990.

== Early career ==
In 1975, she founded the International Soundex Reunion Registry, Inc. (ISRR) as a free mutual consent registry serving adoptees, foster children and others separated from birth family. This registry was supported by Vilardi and her husband Tony for many years. They saved all the donations until they were able to purchase the first computer and then the building in Carson City, Nevada which housed the registry until 2007. Vilardi was survived by her husband, son Ed, sister Pat and many nieces, nephews and grandchildren. In addition, Vilardi served as a mentor to many, with her expertise in genealogy research utilized to assist persons seeking reunion with family from whom they had been separated. She served on the planning committees which created the American Adoption Congress (AAC) and was an original signer to the 1981 incorporation. She was also involved in and served on the advisory board of TRIADOPTION Library and other movement organizations.

== Dear Abby ==
Dear Abby wrote a number of responses referring her readers to ISRR beginning in 1983, because after speaking with Vilardi many times, Abigail VanBuren was supportive of the neutral position the registry provided. Vilardi was involved with the offices of Senator Carl Levin in his numerous attempts to create a federally support registry.

== Adoption reform ==
Vilardi was among those pioneers of adoption reform whose influence is broader than often recognized. In her honor, the AAC has given the "Emma Vilardi Humanitarian Award" annually since 1991.

== Legacy ==
Vilardi created many of the forms and letters still utilized in search today. Maybe most widely used are versions of her “Waiver of Confidentiality”. The ISRR website has many of those original creations and even some in her handwriting. (www.isrr.net) . Her name is mentioned in newsletters and articles of the 1979’s and 80’s (see www.triadoption.com “Newsletters” or “Articles”). Emma’s legacy is many things, but most of all the tens of thousands of individuals who have been reunited because of her insight, commitment and vision.

== Emma Mae Vilardi Humanitarian Award ==
Since her death in 1990, the American Adoption Congress has honored her life and commitment to the adoption community with the Emma May Vilardi Humanitarian Award. The award is distributed annually at the American Adoption Congress International Conference. In 2007, upon the death of Vilardi's husband, Tony, the award was renamed the Vilardi Award to honor both of them.
