= The Primal Wound =

1993 book by Nancy Verrier

- Author: Nancy Verrier
- Language: English
- Genre: Developmental psychology, Attachment, Adoption, Early childhood trauma
- Published: 1993
- ISBN: 9781905664764

The Primal Wound: Understanding the Adopted Child is a book by American author Nancy Verrier published in 1993. The book posits that there is a "primal wound" that develops when a mother and child are separated by adoption shortly after childbirth. It describes the mother and child as having a vital connected relationship which is physical, psychological and physiological, and examines the effects of disrupting such bonds.

The primary focus of the book is on the effects of adoption on the adoptee. A central theme is the assertion that all adoptees, even those adopted at birth, will retain memories of the separation from their birth mothers, and that regardless of the way the adoption is presented and handled by adoptive parents, these memories will have profound effects on the emotional and psychological well-being of the child and adult adoptee.

== Editions ==
- ISBN 0-9636480-0-4 (paperback)
