= Adoption by celebrities =

Josephine Baker, as a part of the Civil Rights Movement, protested against racism by adopting twelve orphans of different skin colors.

In the 2000s, the couples Angelina Jolie / Brad Pitt and Madonna / Guy Ritchie drew media and public attention by adopting several children from Third World countries. The adoptions have been criticized because of alleged preference shown to the parents due to their wealth or celebrity status.

Other celebrities who adopted children from abroad are Mia Farrow (10 children, one of them later marrying Farrow's former partner Woody Allen), Dan Marino, Sharon Stone, Ewan McGregor, Meg Ryan, Mary-Louise Parker, James Caviezel, Katherine Heigl, Hugh Jackman, Tom Cruise and his ex-partner Nicole Kidman, Steven Spielberg and his wife Kate Capshaw and Julie Andrews.
