= Adoptee rights =

Movement for the rights of adopted people

Adoptee rights are the legal and social rights of adopted people relating to their adoption and identity. These rights frequently center on access to information which is kept sealed within closed adoptions, but also include issues relating to intercultural or international adoption, interracial adoption, and coercion of birthparents. Adoption reform efforts are often led by adoptee rights activists.

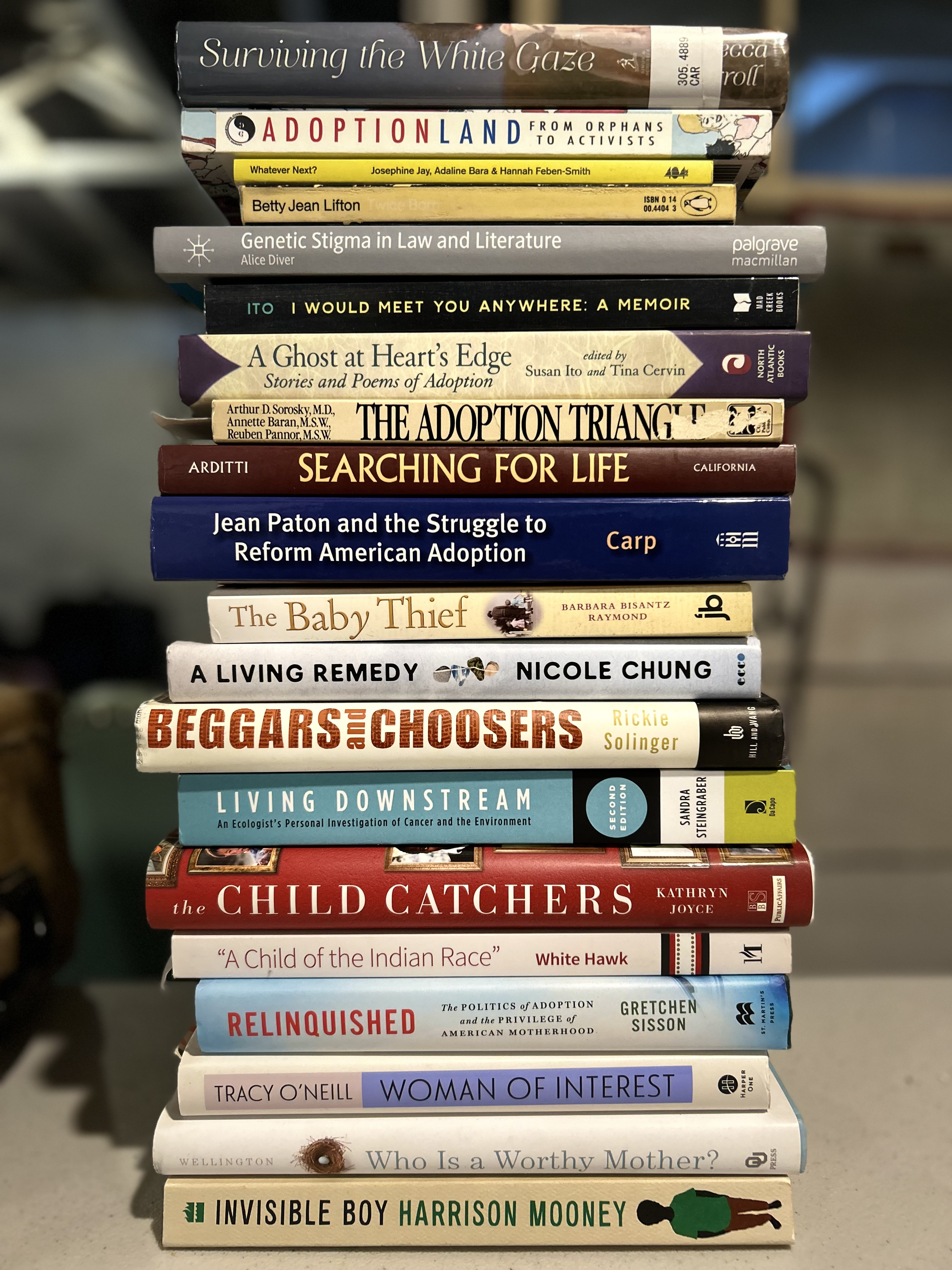
Books about adoption, many written by adopted people

== History ==
The adoptee rights movement in the United States and other Western countries gained popularity following the increased adoption rates of the Baby Scoop Era, beginning with the end of World War II and ending in the early 1970s.

=== United States ===
In the United States, original birth certificates were frequently available to adult adoptees until the mid-twentieth century, when many states passed laws closing birth records. Jean M. Paton, an early adoptee rights activist, established Orphan Voyage in 1953. Orphan Voyage was a support and search network for adoptees looking for their birth families.

As children adopted in the Baby Scoop Era began to reach adulthood in the 1970s, interest in adoptee rights increased significantly. The Adoptees Liberty Movement Association (ALMA) was founded by Florence Anna Fisher in 1971; within a few years, it had 50,000 members and 50 chapters. ALMA's aims included pressuring states to open their adoption records. Search and support groups sprang up as adoptees sought to find information about their birth families; the American Adoption Congress was started in 1978 as an umbrella organization for many of these groups.

Beginning in the 1980s open adoption became more prevalent, providing access to information for birthparents and adoptees as well as the option to be in contact with each other; most adoptions are now open to some extent. Adoptee rights organizations such as Bastard Nation continue to advocate for the opening of sealed adoption records, in addition to other adoptee concerns.

== Issues ==
=== Closed adoption ===
Many adoptee rights concerns center on the negative impacts of closed adoption on adoptees. These include not having information about their own ethnic or religious background, lack of access to medical history, and psychological and emotional challenges relating to attachment. In closed adoptions, adoptees are not permitted access to their own original birth certificate, and governments produce new birth certificates which list the adoptive parents' names as the birth parents. Adoptees' Liberty Movement Association founder Florence Fisher called sealed records "an affront to human dignity."

=== Citizenship of intercountry adoptees ===
Children who are adopted across international boundaries are not necessarily automatically considered citizens of the country of their adoptive parents. Certain requirements may be necessary in order for adoptees to apply for and receive citizenship status. In countries such as Japan, Brazil, and Mexico, foreign adopted children must reside in those countries for a specific period to apply for citizenship. Countries such as Brazil, Israel, and Sweden mandate a social and psychological assessment report of the adoptive parents. In the United States, some adoptees were left without clear citizenship when their parents or adoption agencies did not secure appropriate paperwork or did not apply for naturalization. The Child Citizenship Act of 2000 provided for citizenship of some, but not all, of those adoptees in the United States; legislation has been introduced to Congress each year since 2015 to ensure adoptees receive citizenship, but it has not yet been enacted.

Adoptee rights organizations work with legislators to ensure that adopted people have the same rights to citizenship as non-adopted people.

=== Interracial adoption ===
Transracial adoption—in Western countries, usually involving non-white children who are adopted by white parents—is a contentious issue. Transracial adoptees often face specific challenges, including a lack of diversity in their environment, racism from adoptive family members, and a lack of connection with their birth culture. In addition, they can struggle with developing a cohesive racial and cultural identity. Adoptee rights organizations provide support for transracially adopted people.

=== Anonymous infant abandonment ===
Some adoptee rights organizations are also concerned with the anonymous relinquishment of infants and oppose the implementation of baby boxes, which they believe trivializes the legal abandonment of newborns. The Adoptee Rights Law Center has been a vocal opponent of baby boxes as being a temporary, inadequate solution to problems facing new parents. Anonymous infant relinquishment also echoes the problems of closed adoption, with adoptees left without information about their background or their medical history.

=== Adoption abolition ===
In the early 2000s, anti-adoption viewpoints began to become more prominent, prompted by growing recognition of problems within the adoption industry including coercion, corruption, and lack of transparency. Some reproductive rights activists saw adoption reforms as a necessary component of people having the right to make free decisions concerning reproduction. While support for adoption is widespread in the United States and other Western countries, some adoptee rights activists are supportive of local and national policies that make adoption less prevalent, such as providing financial and other assistance to expectant mothers so that they are not pressured to relinquish their children for adoption. Those who are working towards adoption abolition believe that "if poverty, racism, and health care inequities were properly redressed, adoption would be a last resort."
