= Closed adoption =

Sealed, confidential family court process

Closed adoption (also called "confidential" adoption and sometimes "secret" adoption) is a process by which an infant is adopted by another family, and the record of the biological parent(s) is kept sealed. Often, the biological father is not recorded—even on the original birth certificate. An adoption of an older child who already knows their biological parent(s) cannot be made closed or secret. This used to be the most traditional and popular type of adoption, peaking in the decades of the post-World War II Baby Scoop Era. It still exists today, but it exists alongside the practice of open adoption. The sealed records effectively prevent the adoptee and the biological parents from finding, or even knowing anything about each other (especially during times before the Internet). However, the emergence of non-profit organizations and private companies to assist individuals with their sealed records has been effective in helping people who want to connect with biological relatives to do so.

== Background and procedure ==
Historically, the four primary reasons for married couples to obtain a child via closed adoption have been (in no particular order) infertility, asexuality, having concern for a child's welfare (i.e. would not likely be adopted by others), and to ensure the sex of the child (a family with five girls and no boys, for example). In 1917, Minnesota was the first U.S. state to pass an adoption confidentiality and sealed records law. Within the next few decades, most United States states and Canadian provinces had a similar law. Usually, the reason for sealing records and carrying out closed adoptions is said to be to "protect" the adoptee and adoptive parents from disruption by the natural parents and in turn, to allow natural parents to make a new life.

Many adopting parents in non-private adoptions would apply to a local, state licensed adoption agency. The agency may be a member of the national Child Welfare League of America (CWLA). The CWLA and many adoption agencies are still in operation today, but with an expanded and somewhat different agenda compared to past decades, as the government has largely taken over some of their previous responsibilities.

Prior to adoption, the infant would often be placed in temporary and state-mandated foster care for a few weeks to several months until the adoption was approved. This would also help ensure that the infant was healthy, that the birthparent was sure about relinquishment, and that nothing was overlooked at the time of birth. Today, this practice is discouraged, as it prevents immediate bonding between the mother and child. Also, much better medical testing is available, both prenatally and postnatally. Many children also developed orphanage-type behavior including head banging, rocking and hand flapping. Many adopted adults still retain this rocking behavior especially when tired.

Once the adoption has been approved, the agency transfers the infant from foster care (if used) to the adoptive parents. After the infant has spent a few weeks or months with the adoptive parents, a local judge formally and legally approves the adoption. The natural mother has until the final court hearing. The infant is then issued a second, amended certificate, sometimes stated to be a birth certificate, that states the adopting parents are the child's parents. This becomes the adopted person's permanent, legal "birth" certificate. In the post WWII era, laws were enacted which prevented both the adopted person and adoptive family from accessing the original, and the information given to them can be quite limited (though this has varied somewhat over the years, and from one agency to another). Originally, the sealed record laws were meant to keep information private from everyone except the 'parties to the action' (adoptee, adoptive parent, birthparent and agency). Over time, the laws were reinterpreted or rewritten to seal the information even from the involved parties.

In some states, (North Carolina, Georgia, Virginia) the city and county of the adoptee's birth is changed on the amended birth certificate, to where the adoptive parents were living at the time the adoption was finalized. Often, the states will not give the adoptee the correct location of their birth. Some adoptees have been denied passports for having incomplete birth certificates. The hospital may also be omitted on the amended birth certificate, especially if it primarily serves unwed mothers. In the United States, many such hospitals were run by the Salvation Army, and named after its founder, William Booth. By the mid-1970s, all of these hospitals had closed due to high costs and the reduced need for secrecy, as the social stigma of having a child out of wedlock in America had decreased. More mothers were raising their children as a single parent (often with the help of the newly created institution of government welfare).

== Searches and reunions ==
From the early 1950s when Jean Paton began Orphan Voyage, and into the 1970s with the creation of ALMA, International Soundex Reunion Registry, Yesterday's Children, Concerned United Birthparents, Triadoption Library, and dozens of other local search and reunion organizations, there has been a grass roots support system in place for those seeking information and reunion with family.

Reunion registries were designed so adoptees and their birth parents, siblings or other family members can locate one another at little or no cost. In these mutual consent registries, both parties must have registered in order for there to be a match. Most require the adoptee to be at least 18 years old. Though they did not exist until late in the 20th century, today there are many World Wide Web pages, chat rooms, and other online resources that offer search information, registration and support.

From the very beginning, there have been Search Angels who help adoptees, siblings and birth families locate their relatives for free. Usually, these are persons personally touched by adoption who do not feel anyone should be charged a fee to get information about themselves or their family.

Laws are ever changing and in a few states of the US, a few provinces in Canada, the UK and Australia there are now various forms of open records giving adoptees and birth family members access to information in their files and on each other.

Some states have confidential intermediary systems. This often requires a person to petition the court to view the sealed adoption records, then the intermediary conducts a search similar to that of a private investigator. This can be either a search for the birth mother at the request of the adoptee, or vice versa. Quite often, in the many years which have passed since the adoptee was born, a birth mother or female adoptee has both moved to another address, and married or remarried resulting in a change of her surname. While this can make the search difficult and time-consuming, a marriage certificate may provide the needed clue as to the person's whereabouts. If and when the intermediary is able to contact the birth mother (or adoptee), she is informed that her adopted child (or birth mother) is inquiring about her. In the few states that have open adoption records, should this party indicate that he or she does not want to be contacted, by law, the information would not be given out. Upon completion of the search in which the birth mother agrees to be contacted, the intermediary usually sends the adoptee the official unamended birth certificate obtained from the court. The adoptive parents' application to an adoption agency remains confidential, however.

The cost for a confidential intermediary and related court fees can be around $500, but varies by state and agency. For persons who cannot afford the fees, there is usually assistance available from the tax-payer supported state department or the non-profit agency, and anyone can request from them how-to request this help. Most agencies charge a fixed fee which includes everything, and only in the most extreme and unusual circumstances ask for additional funds. If the adoptee is unable to locate (or would prefer to use a third person) to find their birth father, often the same confidential intermediary can be used for an additional fee.

There are also private search companies and investigators who charge fees to do a search for or assist adoptees and birth mothers and fathers locate each other, as well as to help other types of people searching. These services typically cost much more, but like search organizations and search angels, have far greater flexibility in regards to releasing information, and typically provide their own intermediary services. However, they may not circumvent the law regarding the confidentiality process.

In all adoption searches, it is uncommon to find both the birth mother and father at the same time. A separate search, if desired, can be done afterwards for the father. Since males seldom change their surnames, and the mother might have additional information, it is usually easier than the initial search for the birth mother. In many cases, adoptees are able to do this second search for their birth father by themselves (or they try before paying for assistance).

Females have statistically been somewhat more likely than males to search for their birth parents, and are far more likely to search for their adopted children. Very often, the reason the infant was put up for adoption in the first place was the birth father's unwillingness to marry or otherwise care for the child. Nevertheless, many birth fathers in this situation have agreed to meet with their grown children decades later.

In recent years, DNA tests designed for genealogists have been used by adult adoptees to identify biological relatives.

== Legal matters ==
Only a court order allows closed adoption records to be unsealed, which was quite uncommon prior to the early 1990s. A few cases have surfaced in which records were thought to have been sealed but were not—either by mishandling or misunderstanding. Although rare, a small number of people have been prosecuted over the years for violating the confidentially of sealed adoption records. In 1998, Oregon voters passed Measure 58 which allowed adoptees to unseal their birth records without any court order. Some other states which used to keep closed adoption records sealed permanently by default have since changed to allowing release once the adoptee turns 18. However, these laws were not made retroactive; only future adoptions subsequent to the laws' passage apply.

On June 1, 2009, Ontario, Canada, opened its sealed records to adoptees and their birth parents, with a minimum age of 18 for the adoptee, or one additional year if the birth parents initiate the request. Both parties can protect their privacy by giving notice of how to be either contacted or not, and if the latter, with identifying information being released or not. All adoptions subsequent to September 1, 2008, will be "open adoptions"

For searches involving a confidential intermediary, the intermediary initiates obtaining the court order and is reimbursed for doing so. However, once the court grants this, it is still confidential information to everyone else until the other party agrees otherwise. (See the previous section.)

Many states, though, still keep this information sealed even after the adoptee and the birth parents agree to know and contact each other. A second court order would be required to have this information unsealed permanently. This is well beyond the scope of the initial search, and what is covered by the payment to the intermediary. Should an adoptee subsequently lose their unamended birth certificate, a court order may be required to obtain another one (even if a photocopy is submitted).

The probate laws of most states in the U.S. prohibit an adoptee from automatically inheriting from their birth parents. This applies regardless of whether or not the birth father participated in or agreed to the adoption. Had the adoption not have taken place, any adoptee would be an heir upon their father's death—regardless of who their childhood caretakers were. There can be additional complications if the birth father has subsequently moved to another state. Should a birth parent include an "unknown" adoptee in their will, the probate court has no obligation to fulfill this type of request, while "known" adoptees may have the same status as non-family members. However, there is some variation in probate laws from one state to another.

== Criticism ==
Closed adoption has been increasingly criticized in recent years as being unfair to both the adoptee and their birth parents. Some people believe that making the identities of a child's parents a state secret is a gross violation of human rights. On the other hand, the birth mother may have desired the secrecy because of the circumstances of the child's conception.

In virtually all cases, the decision is up to the adoptive parents regarding how to inform the child that he or she has been adopted, and at what age to do so, if at all. Although a non-profit adoption agency (if one is used) might mail newsletters and solicit funds from the parents, traditionally, it has been extremely rare for them to communicate directly with the child (usually, adoption agencies do not contain the word "adoption" in their name).

Difficulties include the lack of a genetic medical history which could be important in disease prevention. Often, this was not given at the time of adoption, and the father's history is usually little known even to the mother.

Adoptive parents may be less likely to consider the possibility that they are doing something wrong, and blame the child's heredity. The parents may even unfavorably compare their adopted child with a near-perfect, genetically related "fantasy" child. This enables them to blame ordinary problems which all parents face on their child's supposedly "defective" genes. Thus, while non-adoptive parents are focused on nurture, some adoptive parents are solely focused on nature (i.e. heredity) instead. This results in what could have been an easily resolved problem, going unresolved in families with adopted children, possibly accompanied by child abuse.

For many years in New York State, adoptees had to obtain the permission of their adoptive parents (unless deceased) to be included in a state-sponsored reunion registry regardless of the age of the adoptee. In some cases, older adults or even senior citizens felt like they were being treated like children, and required to obtain their parents' signature on the form. In a broader sense, they felt it could be inferred that adopted children are always children, and thus second-class citizens subject to discrimination. The law has since been changed.

== Organizations and media ==
Most US states and Canadian provinces have independent non-profit organizations that help adoptees and their birth parents initiate a search, and offers other adoption-related support. There are also independent and state funded reunion registries that facilitate reuniting family members. The International Soundex Reunion Registry (ISRR) is the oldest and largest. The Salvation Army also provides information in helping those who were born or gave birth in its maternity hospitals or homes (see the external links below). This is a change from previous decades, when nothing was ever released without a rarely given or sought court order.

Many in the adoption community first learned of search and support resources through newspaper articles, the Dear Abby column and various TV shows and movies. Starting in the mid-1980s, many adoptees and their parents first learned about the possibility of reunion on the NBC (later CBS) television program Unsolved Mysteries hosted by Robert Stack. This was under their "Lost Loves" category, the vast majority of which involved closed adoption. More than 100 reunions have occurred as a result of the program, many of those being the adoption-related cases. Reruns of the program (with a few new segments and updates) were also aired on the Lifetime Television cable network until mid-2006, and very briefly on Spike TV in late 2008. In September 2010, the program returned to Lifetime from 4 to 7 pm ET/PT.

In 2013, the film Philomena based on the book The Lost Child of Philomena Lee, opened in cinemas worldwide. It tells the true story of Philomena's 50-year-long search for her forcefully adopted Irish infant son, who was sent to the United States. She is eventually assisted by BBC journalist Martin Sixsmith, which takes up the majority of the film. Starring Judi Dench as Philomena and Steve Coogan as Sixsmith, it was nominated for four American and four British Academy Awards.
