= Post-adoption depression syndrome =

- Symptoms: Anxiety, changes in appetite, fatigue, feeling hopeless, concentration problems, suicidal thoughts
- Usual onset: Around one month post adoption
- Causes: Changes in life related to adoption
- Prevention: Pre-adoption services to properly prepare and post-adoption services to assist the initial stages of adoption
- Treatment: Medication, therapy
- Frequency: 10-32% of adoption cases

Post-adoption depression is shown though symptoms of depression in the adoptive mother or father, generally seen from one month after adoption, and is experienced by anywhere from 10% to 32% of adoptive parents. The symptoms of post-adoption depression are common to symptoms of depression, and include changes in sleeping pattern and appetite, feelings of hopelessness, fatigue, problems with concentration and restlessness, as well as suicidal thoughts. These symptoms are also similar to those of postpartum depression, which is a related syndrome. Postpartum depression, however, involves hormonal changes in pregnant woman, which are not present in women suffering from post-adoption depression. Despite this difference, there are still significant changes that new parents go through, even when the child is not biologically their own. These changes can have significant impacts on mental health. Post-adoption depression can also negatively impact the child.

There is not an extensive amount of research available concerning post-adoption depression, however since the early 2000s practitioners have begun to take an interest in the syndrome and its effects on new parents. Given that many of the symptoms of post-adoption depression, as well as prescribed treatments, are similar to those of postpartum depression, much of the research on postpartum depression are applicable to post adoption depression.

== Signs and symptoms ==
Signs and symptoms of post-adoption depression often come out around one month post adoption.

- Anxiety
- Changes in appetite
- Fatigue
- Feeling hopeless
- Concentration problems
- Suicidal thoughts

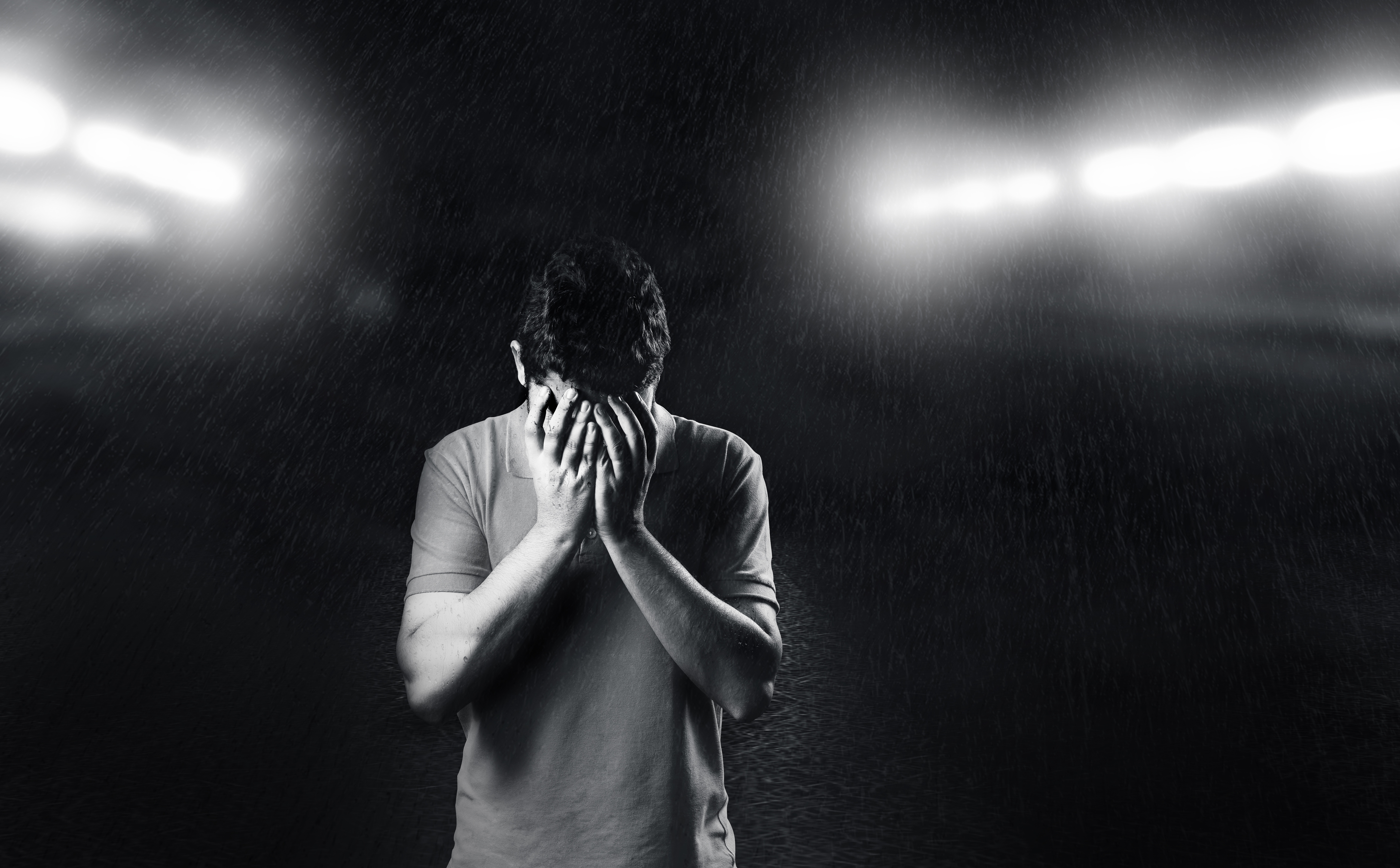
Post-adoption depression can affect mothers and fathers, with them feeling inadequate or the adoption not meeting their expectations.

== Causes ==
The cause of post-adoption depression has not been indefinitely specified, however, research has shown the development of depression in adoptive parents often is not due to personal or family mental health history, but linked to stresses in the environment and adjustments in parents lifestyle in relation to adoption. It was found rates of depression in parents post-adoption correlated highly with the change in sleeping pattern and lack of sleep, the restlessness of the child and any health problems present, for example colic.

Causes of post-adoption depression include the lifestyle changes that come with adopting a baby, like lack of sleep, mental and physical exhaustion, as well as medical or psychological problems which is common in adoptive children. Other factors that can stress adoptive parents include potential financial strain for the family and evaluation for parental fitness, both of which can contribute to the likelihood of developing post-adoption depression.

A correlation was found between a decline in mental and physical health post-adoption and the weakening in the parents relationship. Conversely, women with mental and physical support from their partner and have intimate relations are found to be more stable in their mental health.

=== Stress related to adoption ===
Adoptive parents face many changes in their lives and daily routines after adoption, which can affect the parents state of mental health. These would include the parental evaluation first time adoptive parents face, possible financial strain as well as the reminder of infertility and therefore possible feelings of guilt or inadequacy. New parents also encounter other stresses that are not due to the adoption process specifically, like lack of sleep or the physical exhaustion suffered from caring for a young child.

=== Relationship with partner ===
The relationship between the adoptive parents may be under some sort of strain during the adoption period, which can contribute to developing post-adoption depression syndrome. Both the maintenance of the relationship physically and mentally, as well as the support from the partner and their enthusiasm for being an adoptive parent have effects on mental health.

=== Demographics of adoptive parents ===
Data shows 81% of adoptive parents are 35–44 years old, and that women who have attempted to become pregnant with medical assistance are ten times more likely to adopt. As well as this, profiles made about cases of adoption have shown adoptive parents generally have a higher level of education and have more financial resources available to them. Therefore, their personal expectations of the adoption process are often not met, and the very lengthy procedure can make the parents feel as though they have no control over the situation. This can change the focus of the adoption to the process itself, and not the parenting and therefore not able to fully prepare for raising the child.

== Diagnosis ==
Although there are no tests specific to identifying post adoption depression disorder, there are ways of identifying depression as well as postpartum depression which can be applied to situations in which post adoption depression may be present.

=== Inventory of Depression and Anxiety Symptoms ===
A method of diagnosing depression in which the patient rates their symptoms of insomnia, anxiety, appetite changes, suicidal thoughts and other symptoms on a scale of 1–5. This scale can assist the diagnosis of post adoption depression through the prevalence of the symptoms and the relation to the current life status.

=== Edinburgh Postnatal Depression Scale (EPDS) ===
A questionnaire was designed for adoptive parents to evaluate and report how they have been feeling in the past seven days in response to ten questions in relation to emotions, anxiety, sleeping behaviours, and general happiness. A study that modified this scale and had one hundred and twelve mothers fill out this modified questionnaire. From this, it was concluded sixty eight mothers were suffering from post adoption depression. It was also found this was not due to family history or personal medical history, but majority of the cases were associated with stress and other changes in day-to-day life of adoptive mothers.

== Pre-adoption services ==
Having post-adoption services available to adoptive parents, like family counseling and information sessions is vital in developing parents understanding of issues relating to the adoption process and ultimately attempt to form a close bond between families. If parents adopt and do not gain the appropriate knowledge to sustain a successful adoption, they could miss vital signs of previous mental or physical abuse which may be thought of as behavioural issues. Cases of adoption where the adoptee has gone though mental or physical trauma can lessen the likelihood of a successful adoption if the parents are not adequately qualified to identify signs and follow through with any help the child may need. These issues could lead to frustration and stress for the parents and therefore not meet their expectations of adoption.

== Post-adoption services ==
Although there are many services available to adults before they adopt, there are very few services for parents after they have adopted. Many the services provided for families post adoption are dedicated to special cases of adoption for example for children with special needs.

Adoption involving people linked to the family, a relative or step-parent tend to cause fewer problems as being close to the family and children can set-up expectations accordingly. For children adopted into families that are unrelated, and do not have children, there is potential for more problems to come about as there is a more drastic change in the parents and adoptees' lives, and therefore being more difficult to adapt to these changes. In terms of older children, there is a greater level of disruption in the adoption, thought to be due to the greater difficulty they face when adapting to their new situation. As well as this, there is a greater possibility older children were subjected to forms of abuse and neglect and therefore potentially feel less open to the idea of embracing a new home environment.

== Effects of post-adoption depression on the adoptee ==
Post-adoption depression effects often has a significant impact on mother or fathers parenting. This can lead to behavioural problems in the child, significantly due to the lack of attention the infant received, especially when compared to a child to the attentiveness of a mother with more stable mental health.

=== Cognitive development ===
Interactions with insensitive parents who give insufficient attention have been shown to lead to poorer cognitive function. This leads to lower performance in learning tasks, which then contributes to the likelihood of a depressed mother being significantly less likely to provide stimulants to their children.

=== Behavioural development ===
A significant amount of an infant's day is traditionally spent with the mother or father, and the lack of mood control displayed by the parents can lead to problems for the child in terms of internalising and externalising problems. These issues lead to children feeling more depressed and expressing destructive and aggressive behaviours. It has been proven these children are more inclined to develop psychopathology.

=== Academic development ===
A correlation has been found between parents with mental health issues and children with attention deficit hyperactivity disorder. There are also links with these children requiring special education as well as experiencing difficulties in mathematics as well as problems with attention.
