= Concerned United Birthparents =

US non-profit organization

Concerned United Birthparents, Inc. (CUB), a non-profit organization established in 1976, is one of two primary nationwide organizations offering support to the biological parents of adopted people in the United States. The organization is credited with the creation of the term "birthparent."

== History ==
In the 1970s, support groups for mothers and for adoptees began to proliferate. The first groups were sponsored by adoptee rights organizations, such as the Adoptees Liberty Movement Association (ALMA), which was founded by adoptee Florence Fisher in 1971. Soon after, in 1976, Concerned United Birthparents (CUB) was founded by surrendering mother Lee Cambell. The original mission was "to provide support for birthparents who have relinquished a child to adoption; to provide resources to help prevent unnecessary family separations; to educate the public about the life-long impact on all who are touched by adoption; and to advocate for fair and ethical adoption laws, policies, and practices."

A 2003 revision of this statement formally extended CUB's area of emphasis to include "all family members separated by adoption rather than birth parents alone. "CUB grew rapidly in the late 1970s and early 1980s, drawing new members from around the country."

As of mid-2013 CUB maintained headquarters in Encinitas, California. The group currently has 10 chapters and over 400 members around the United States.

CUB is actively interested in search-related issues, and new members may insert free ads in the organization's newsletter. CUB members believe adoption is not always necessary, especially when the birthparent's problem is a temporary one, such as inadequate finances or lack of emotional support. The members can provide assistance to birthparents for whom adoption is not the first choice yet who see no other answer. The organization also works for changes in adoption policy.

== Origin of the term "Birthparents" ==
According to adoption historian Ellen Herman, CUB organizer Lee Campbell and her co-founders were the first to coin the term "birthmother" (and by extension "birthparents") in an effort to describe the relationship between the biological parents and the child put up for adoption in a new way. The term was introduced as a compromise between "natural mother" and "biological mother."

According to Campbell:

"We didn't want to upset adoptive parents with ‘natural.’ And ‘biological’ now made us gag. 'Biological,' we felt, was descriptive of a mechanical incubator or unfeeling baby machine. 'Birth' was the key. With 'birth parents' as one word...we were like other one-word progenitors, like grandparents."
