= Adoptees Liberty Movement Association =

- Formation: 1971
- Founder: Florence Anna Fisher
- Dissolved: 2024

The Adoptees' Liberty Movement Association (ALMA) was one of the first adoptee rights organizations in the United States, founded in 1971 by adoptee, author, and activist Florence Anna Fisher. Its principal initial goals were to "abolish the existing practice of 'sealed records'" and to secure the "opening of records to any adopted person over eighteen who wants, for any reason, to see them." While ALMA was one of the plaintiffs in a 1978 federal lawsuit challenging the constitutionality of sealing and restricting the release of pre-adoption birth records to adult adopted people, the lawsuit ultimately was not successful, setting back the adoptee rights movement for years.

The establishment of ALMA, in conjunction with the publishing of Fisher's autobiography in 1973, led to the creation of hundreds of other adoptee search-related groups across the United States, including Yesterday's Children, Adoptees' Identity Movement, and Reunite. Despite its early activism and advocacy, ALMA ultimately concentrated on assisting adopted people with birthparent and relative searches and at one time had more than 50,000 members, 50 chapters, and 340,000 names registered within its own adoption search registry. Adoptees have credited ALMA with inspiring and assisting with their searches for information about their birth parents.

ALMA was considered a pioneering organization in the adoptee rights movement, shifting the focus to right-based constitutional arguments instead of seeking state-by-state legislative changes. The activist adoptee rights organization Bastard Nation, which formed in the 1990s, has cited Fisher's activism and ALMA's goals as the beginning of the adoptee rights movement.
