= Jean M. Paton =

Founder of the adoption reform movement

Jean M. Paton (1908 – 2002) was an American adoptee rights activist who worked to reverse harmful policies, practices, and laws concerning adoption and closed records. Paton founded the adoptee support and search network Orphan Voyage in 1953, helping connect adoptees with their birthparents, and was instrumental in the creation of the American Adoption Congress and Concerned United Birthparents in the 1970s.

== Biography ==
Jean Paton was born in Detroit on December 27, 1908. She was a sculptor and a psychiatric social worker. Paton earned her Master of Social Work from the University of Pennsylvania in 1945 and worked for a short time at the New Hampshire Children's Aid Society.

She was able to obtain her adoption records and original birth certificate, including her birth parents' names, from the probate court in 1942.

Paton died on March 27, 2002 at the North Regional Medical Center in Harrison, Arkansas.

== Adoptee rights activism ==
Beginning in 1950, Paton dedicated herself to advocating for adoptees and facilitating meetings between birthparents and adoptees. In an unpublished article written in 1949, she advocated for an independent, voluntary adoption registry through which relatives could be reunited; these would become common in the mid-1970s. She personally counseled thousands of adoptees and birthmothers on how to begin their searches.

In 1953, Paton founded the Life History Study Center as a research and communications center for adopted adults. The Center's goals were to provide an identity to adult adoptees and make the public aware of the voices of adoptees. She published The Adopted Break Silence in 1954, which collected stories of forty adult adoptees. The book investigated whether these adoptions "worked," that is, whether the adoptees were loved and well cared for.

By 1961, Paton became discouraged by a lack of progress and discontinued publications through the Life History Study Center. However, the concept of illegitimacy was being discussed by scholars and adoptees, and she founded Orphan Voyage, "a program of mutual aid and guidance for social orphans," in 1962. In 1968, under the pseudonym Ruthena Hill Kittson, she wrote the book Orphan Voyage, which argued that adult adoptees should have the right to make decisions about search and reunion with their birth parents.

Paton was "fundamental" in the 1979 foundation of the first organization for adult adoptees in the United States, the American Adoption Congress. She also supported the founders of the Concerned United Birthparents when that organization was started in 1976.

Her biography, Jean Paton and the Struggle to Reform American Adoption, was written in 2014 by E. Wayne Carp. The papers of Jean Paton are available at the Social Welfare History Archives within the University of Minnesota Libraries.
