= International Soundex Reunion Registry =

Non-profit Organisation

The International Soundex Reunion Registry, Inc. is a 501(c)(3) non-profit, tax exempt, humanitarian organization founded in 1975 by Emma May Vilardi. ISRR is a free mutual consent adoption reunion registry for persons desiring a reunion with next-of-kin. This agency serves the needs of family members who have been separated from each other by adoption, divorce, foster care, abandonment, or other means.

The registry's filing system was based originally on Soundex Code which is a phonetic way of coding giving numeric value to consonants and ignores vowels, except as a first letter. This system allows for matching despite some differences in spelling. It was a perfect foundation for a situation where often people did not know exact spelling.

The founder, Emma May Vilardi, was a remarkable woman of extraordinary vision and courage who undertook this important, humane task of providing a safe and secure way for persons seeking contact to make themselves available to each other. This registry remains her legacy to the adoption community and the hundreds of thousands served. "It was not until Emma began looking for the reasons behind the many illnesses that she had suffered that she learned that ancestors and genetics were the key to understanding her health problems. Daring a probate judge to unseal an adoption record, she quickly learned that her ancestors had succumbed to the same diseases."

The ISRR Executive Board of Trustees is responsible for ensuring the operation of the registry for future generations. The registry motto is, "United today for the reunions of tomorrow." For many it remains a place of hope when they feel all other resources have been exhausted, for others it was a quick and easy step that led them to connect with family members they longed to know.

Now one of many existing adoption reunion registries, Soundex is the oldest and largest of its kind. It served as a model for many state registries, for Senator Carl Levin's U.S. Senate Bill's in the 1980s trying to establish a national adoption registry, and into the 1990s and for the abundance of online registries established to help adoptees and birth family member find each other.

The adoption reform movement groups supported ISRR and recommended their members register. Most state registries, agencies and courts also refer directly to ISRR as an option for those seeking reunification with family. There are many articles and references archived in newsletters, clippings and other resources. Registration at ISRR is free because of the donations made by registrants, and the time given by volunteers.

Dear Abby referred to ISRR many times over the years. Each time registrations would arrive by the thousands resulting in many matches. One story is of an adoptee who registered 20 years to the day of when his birthmother's registration arrived. Both had read the same Dear Abby article. The adoptee had carried it in his wallet for twenty years.

There are around 225,000 active registrations, at any given time. ISRR was paper based until 2003, when the volunteers began an imaging project that took five years to complete. Now all forms are digitized.
