= Florence Anna Fisher =

American adoptee rights activist

Florence Anna Fisher (1928–2023) was an American adoptee and author of The Search for Anna Fisher, an autobiography that told of her experiences as an adopted person who set out to search for her biological roots and pre-adoption identity. She is considered one of the founders of the modern adoptee rights movement in the United States, having founded the Adoptees Liberty Movement Association in 1971.

Fisher spoke out strongly against the sealed records of closed adoption, which became commonplace in the mid-twentieth century. In a 1974 Time article, Fisher said, "People today are finding secrecy evil. They are more open and they want to know the truth." She maintained that whether an adoptive home was supportive or abusive is irrelevant to the damage done by adoption, because adoptees still grapple with questions of identity.

She died in Brooklyn, New York on October 1, 2023 from complications following several strokes.

== Bibliography ==
- Fisher, Florence (1973). The search for Anna Fisher (1st ed.). New York: A. Fields Books. ISBN 978-0-525-63001-2.
