= American Adoption Congress =

Umbrella organization for adoption reform

The American Adoption Congress (AAC) was an international adoption-reform organization created in the late 1970s as an umbrella organization for adoption search, support, and reform groups. Initiated by Orphan Voyage founder Jean M. Paton, people representing many groups gathered in regions around the United States and began planning the incorporation. The first AAC Conference was held in Washington, DC in May 1979. The second was in Anaheim, CA in 1980, and the third at the TWA Training facility outside Kansas City in 1981, where the AAC was reincorporated and gained 501(c)3 tax exempt status. AAC conferences were held annually around the United States from 1979 until 2020, when the conference, its last, was cancelled because of the COVID-19 pandemic.

The American Adoption Congress represented the interests of individuals who identified as adopted people, birth parents, and adoptive parents, as well as individuals, families, and organizations committed to adoption reform. While it existed, the AAC promoted honesty, openness, and respect for family connections in adoption, foster care, and assisted reproduction, and it provided education to members and professional communities about the lifelong process of adoption. Until 2024, the AAC advocated for state legislation to grant every individual access to information about their family and heritage.

In a letter dated July 25, 2024, AAC President Matt Naylor announced the dissolution of the organization effective in August 2024. According to the letter, "... we will be transferring our remaining assets, after all payables are distributed, to the Adoptees’ Liberty Movement Association (ALMA), in existence since 1971. ALMA has pledged a continuance of legislative advocacy to restore unrestricted access to original birth certificates for all adult adopted persons, a cause the AAC continues to champion."

The AAC formally filed for dissolution with the Missouri Secretary of State on October 1, 2024.

== Conference history ==
Year	Dates	Location	Theme	Keynotes
2016	March 30 - Apr 3	Denver, CO	Trailblazing Change: Moving Mountains Together in Adoption	Dr. Joyce Maguire Pavao; Amanda Transue-Woolston; Dr. Amanda Baden; Delores Teller; Marilyn Mendenhall Waugh; Kathleen Nielson; Mark Hagland
2015	March 26 - Apr 29	Cambridge, MA	Education, Advocate, Legislate	Bennett Greenspan; Rhonda Roorda; David Smolin Rev. Dr. Nicholas Cooper-Lewter
2014	April 9–13	San Francisco, CA	Building Bridges for Change	Lisa Marie Rollins; John Raible; Leslie Pate Mackinnon; Rickie Solinger; Zara Phillips
2013	April 10–14	Cleveland, OH	Create the Next Wave	Adam Pertman; Thomas Rector; Dominique Moceanu & Jennifer Bricker; Gina Samuels; Jean Strauss & Rep. Sara Feigenholtz (D-IL)
2012	April 26–29	Denver, CO	Mile High Expectations: Adoption in 2012	Clarissa Pinkola Estes; Sherrie Eldridge; Pekitta Tynes
2011	April 14–17	Orlando, FL	Many Faces of Adoption	Ron Nydam; Mary Gauthier; Deann Liem; Susan Harris O'Conner; Rebecca Denton & Lynn Lauber; Mary Anne Alton
2010	March 18–21	Sacramento, CA	Voices of Adoption: Speaking Our Truth, Restoring Our Rights	Jean Strauss; Deborah Jiang Stein; Cathy Lind Hayes; Carista Luminare; Delores Teller
2009	April 22–26	Cleveland, OH	Transforming Families, Connecting Lives	Darryl McDaniels; Sharon Roszia; Dorothy Roberts; Joe Eszterhas & Suzanne Perryman; Jean Strauss; Paula Benoit
2008	March 26–29	Portland, OR	Adoption in the Global Community: Redefining Kinship in the 21st Century	Sharon Roszia; David Brodzinsky; Kevin Campbell; Barbara Raymond
2007	March 7–10	Wakefield, MA	Take the Freedom Trail to Truth in Adoption	Darryl McDaniels; Sandy Whitehawk; Gerald Mallon; Ann Fessler
2005	July 6–10	Las Vegas, NV	Don’t Gamble with Truth in Adoption	Fr. Tom Brosnan; Adam Pertman; Russell Friedman; Jean Strauss
2004	March 31 - Apr. 4	Kansas City, MO	Back To Our Roots	Ron Nydam; Marcy Axness; Alison Larkin
2003	April 2–5	Atlanta, GA	AAC’s Silver Anniversary Conference	Jaiya John; Annette Baran; Lorraine Dusky
2002	April 10–14	Philadelphia, PA	Let Freedom Ring	Jett Williams; Ruth Amerson; Betsy Forrest & Pam Hasegawa; Betty Jean Lifton; Rev. Dwight Wolter; Zara Phillips; Adam Pertman
2001	April 19–22	Anaheim, CA	2001 An Adoption Odyssey	Penny Callan Partridge & Ron Nydam; Adam Pertman; Joyce Maguire Pavao; Fr. Tom Brosnan; Annette Baran; Kris Probasco
2000	April 13–16	Nashville, TN	Millennium Victories & Visions: A Celebration of Accomplishments, A Confirmation of Purpose, A Challenge to Continue	Patricia Martinez; Nancy Verrier; Joyce Maguire Pavao; Caprice East; Denny Gladd; Fred Greenman Jr. Julie Sandine; Robert D. Tuke; Annette Baran
1999	May 13–16	McLean, VA	Rights, Responsibilities, Reality Building Blocks for Adoption Reform	Susan Harris; Mi Ok Song Bruining; Ron Nydam
1998	April 2–5	Bellevue, WA	Sounding New Depths, Exploring New Channels	Betty Jean Lifton; Joyce Maguire Pavao; Nancy Verrier; Carol Schaefer; Annette Baran; Penny Callan Partridge
1997	April 3–5	Irving, TX	The Train to Open Records	Betty Jean Lifton; Joyce Maguire Pavao; Nancy Verrier; Carol Schaefer; Annette Baran; Penny Callan Partridge
1996	April 25–28	Baltimore, MD	Coming of Age	Annette Baran; Rev. Thomas Brosnan; Reuben Pannor; Joyce Maguire Pavao; Barbara Tremitiere
1995	April 10–12	Las Vegas, NV	Adoption: Laying Our Cards on the Table
1994	April 21–24	New Orleans, LA	Jazzin' It Up in Adoption
1993	April 1–3	Cleveland, OH	New Horizons in Adoption
1992	March 19–22	Philadelphia, PA	We the People Proclaiming Liberty in Adoption
1991	April 10–14	Garden Grove, CA	Sharpening the Focus on Adoption
1990	May 24–27	Chicago, IL	Winds of Change: Adoption in the New Age
1989	April 5–9	New York, NY	Illumination on Adoption
1988	April 28 - May 1	Calgary, Alberta	Adoption Into the 90's
1987	May 28–30	Boston, MA
1984	May 31 - June 3	Seattle, WA	Educate, Legislate & Emancipate
1983	May 19–22	Columbus, OH	Come Grow With Us
1982	June 3–6	San Antonio, TX
1981	May 28–31	Overland Park, KS	Open Minds, Open Records
1980	May 8–11	Anaheim, CA
1979	May 4–7	Washington, DC
