= Parents' rights movement =

Civil rights movement related to family law

The parents' rights movement is a civil rights movement primarily interested in human rights affecting parents related to family law, including child custody. Parents' rights are connected to parental responsibility and right to family life.

== Universal Declaration of Human Rights ==
Article 26 of Universal Declaration of Human Rights enshrines the right of parents to choose the education for their children:

3. Parents have a prior right to choose the kind of education that shall be given to their children.

— Universal Declaration of Human Rights, Article 26

== Parents' rights in Convention on the Rights of the Child ==
Article 14 of Convention on the Rights of the Child enshrines both parents' rights and parental duties against the state:

2. States Parties shall respect the rights and duties of the parents and, when applicable, legal guardians, to provide direction to the child in the exercise of his or her right in a manner consistent with the evolving capacities of the child.

— Convention on the Rights of the Child, Article 14

== Child custody ==
Some parents' rights advocates claim that many parents' parental rights are unnecessarily terminated, and that children are separated from fathers and mothers and adopted through the actions of family courts and government social service agencies seeking to meet their own targets, rather than looking at the merits of each case.

== United Kingdom ==
=== Fostering and adoption ===
In June 2007, UK parents' rights advocates criticized the local court, claiming that it was treating children as adoptable commodities, that decisions were made on lack of evidence and perjury, and that courtroom secrecy was harming families and children. In July 2017, a judge ruled that Gloucestershire County Council had removed a baby from its vulnerable mother unlawfully.

Former Georgia Senator Nancy Schaefer was a vocal critic of the corruption that the Adoption and Safe Families Act incentivized in all child protection organizations. She argued that the thousands of dollars in adoption bonuses for every child adopted out rewarded such organizations with seizing children from and thwarting reunification efforts with the children's parents.

=== Medical treatment ===
The issue of parents' rights has also arisen in connection with disagreements over medical treatment. Two recent high-profile cases in the UK are the Charlie Gard case in 2017 and the Ashya King case in 2014. In both cases there was disagreement between parents and doctors about the best course of treatment and the cases were taken to court. This has led to an impassioned debate about who should have the final say – parents or doctors.

== United States ==
=== Parental Rights Amendment to the United States Constitution ===
The Parental Rights Amendment was proposed by Rep. Pete Hoekstra (R-MI) on March 31, 2009, and numbered H.J.Res.42. On April 27, 2009, it was referred to the Subcommittee on the Constitution, Civil Rights, and Civil Liberties. It garnered 141 cosponsors.

In the Senate, an identical bill (which was numbered S.J.Res.13) was introduced by Sen. David Vitter (R-LA) on March 3, 2009, but had no additional sponsors. It was referred to the Committee on the Judiciary.

On May 14, 2009, Sen. Jim DeMint (R-SC) proposed the Parental Rights Amendment with an additional section clarifying that "This article shall take effect after the date of ratification." It was numbered S.J.Res.16; it was referred to the Committee on the Judiciary. It received six cosponsors.

A global children's-rights treaty, ratified by every U.N. member except the United States and Somalia, has so alarmed its American critics that some are now pushing to add a parental-rights amendment to the Constitution as a buffer against it. Republican U.S. Rep. Pete Hoekstra has proposed an amendment to the Constitution safeguarding parental rights as a buffer against the potential U.S. ratification of the U.N. Convention on the Rights of the Child. Opponents of the treaty contend it would enable government officials and a Geneva-based U.N. committee of experts to interfere with parental authority.

Rep. Hoekstra said he and his allies have been concerned by some recent court rulings that they view as erosions of parental rights, but the U.N. treaty is their main concern.

His amendment opens by declaring: "The liberty of parents to direct the upbringing and education of their children is a fundamental right." It says the U.S. government and the states cannot infringe on that right without clear justification and concludes: "No treaty may be adopted nor shall any source of international law be employed to supersede, modify, interpret, or apply to the rights guaranteed by this article."

Ratification of an international treaty requires two-thirds support in the Senate, which would - in the chamber's current makeup - require more than a half-dozen Republicans to join majority Democrats.

To date, the Bill has not made it to the floor of the House or Senate for a vote and has been reintroduced in every session since it was originally introduced.

On January 30, 2019, Bill H.J.Res.36, "Proposing an amendment to the Constitution of the United States relating to parental rights", was introduced to the House by Rep. Jim Banks (R-IN). A new constitutional amendment proposal would establish parental rights in the U.S. Constitution — along with the existing rights to freedom of speech, religion, press, and the rest.

Specifically, it would enshrine "the liberty of parents to direct the upbringing, education, and care of their children." The education component would enshrine the right to choose a private schools, religious school, or homeschooling.

It also clarifies that the amendment would not "apply to a parental action or decision that would end life.'' In other words, this presumably means the rights of a parent would not extend to the right to abort a pregnancy.

On September 22, 2020, the Family Preservation Foundation, a nonprofit 501(c)(3) organization advocating for both children's and parental rights, created a petition on the "We the People" website at petitions.whitehouse.gov to gather signatures to urge Congress to act on H.J.Res.36 which was before congress during the current (2019–2020) session.

Supporters argue the bill explicitly gives America's 173 million parents more rights and freedoms apart from government control.

=== Opposition ===
Opponents counter that the amendment could have unintended consequences, from the medical to the legal.

"No U.N. treaty will ever usurp the national sovereignty of this country," said Meg Gardinier, chair of a national coalition backing the treaty. "Ratification would boost our credibility globally."

"The amendment was dangerous, because children would be left in abusive homes and teenagers would be prevented from obtaining information and services that would help them avoid pregnancy, STDs and abortion," Patricia Donovan of the Guttmacher Institute wrote in a summary of a similar state-level constitutional amendment that failed in Colorado.

"Although attractive on paper," Donovan continued, "in practice it would turn public schools into ideological battlegrounds for parents with opposing values and make adoptions more difficult because adoptive placements could be challenged in court. And it was so vague that it would result in a flood of litigation initiated by angry parents, at taxpayers' expense, against anyone working with children, including teachers, librarians, social workers and counselors."

=== Massachusetts ===
Parental rights activists state that employees of the Massachusetts Department of Social Services (DSS) take children away from their parents without cause. They add that these employees, who they assert have improperly received immunity from the Massachusetts Supreme Court, threaten mothers with the loss of their children to coerce them into divorcing their husbands and attending support groups. They state that these support groups serve the dual purpose of allowing the associates of the DSS employees to receive additional government funding for running the support groups, and allowing the DSS employees to gain information used to take children away from their parents. Parental rights advocates state that abuse of power has occurred and that vested interest has played a role.

== See also ==
- Forced adoption in the United Kingdom
- Ruby Franke
