= Child selling =

Practice of selling children

Child-selling is the practice of selling children, usually by parents, legal guardians, or subsequent custodians, including adoption agencies, orphanages and Mother and Baby Homes. Where the subsequent relationship with the child is essentially non-exploitative, it is usually the case that purpose of child-selling was to permit adoption.

== International law ==
The Hague Convention on Intercountry Adoption is a treaty which bans the buying and selling of children and attempts to impose controls and regulation on inter-country adoption, which gives rise to the practice.

== Afghanistan ==
According to UNO HR deputy director coordinator the country is very poor so many people are selling their children and unborn children, daughters are being sold into marriage and or for forced child labor for $850-2000 US dollars.

== China ==
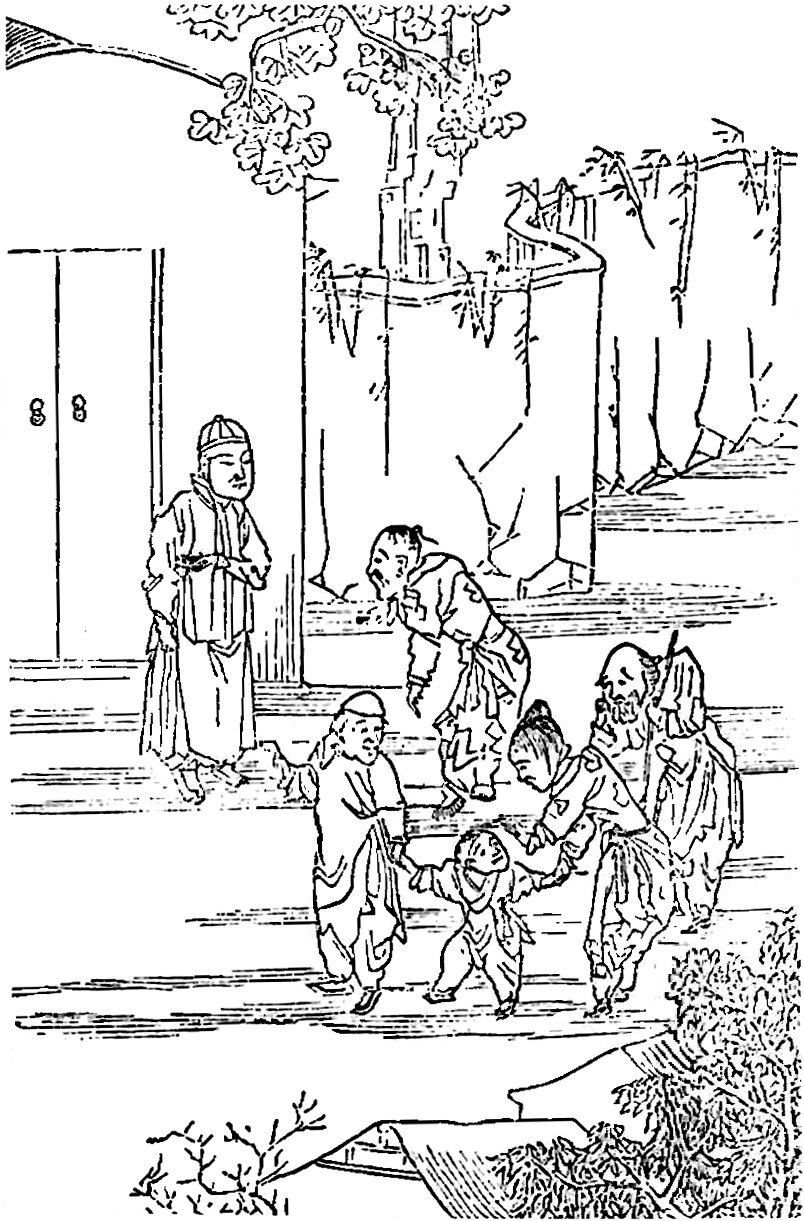
Parents selling their children during the Northern Chinese Famine of 1876–79, drawn 1878

According to Frank Dikötter, in 1953 or 1954, when there was starvation, "across the country people sold their children" and a 1950 report by the Chinese Communist Party on Shanghai "deplored ... the sale of children due to joblessness" and, Dikötter continued, sale of children by "many" of the unemployed also occurred in south China, near Changchun "some families sold their children", in 1953 during a famine in some provinces "desperate parents even bartered their children", and one price in 1950–1953 in Nanhe County was "a handful of grain", another price in 1953 or 1954 having been 50 yuan, enough for the father (the seller) to buy rice to last through a famine.

According to a 2006 report, low-income families and unwed mothers sell babies, often girls, in the underground market in China, and the sales are to parents who want servants, more children, or future brides for sons. "Relatively few Chinese brokers are caught and prosecuted."

According to a 2007 English newspaper report, in China, 190 children were snatched every day, but the Chinese government did not acknowledge the extent or cause of the problem.

According to a 2013 English-language Chinese newspaper report, Chen Shiqu, director of the Chinese Ministry of Public Security's human trafficking task force, said that since a DNA database started in April 2009 it has matched 2,348 children with their biological parents. Zhang Baoyan, founder of the non-government organisation Baby Back Home, said the database is the most effective way to reunite families. Baby Back Home receives an average of 50 inquiries a day from abducted children and their parents; Baby Back Home gives blood samples to the ministry for DNA testing. However Zhang Baoyan, founder of Baby Back Home, said that "there are still some parents of missing children who have no idea about the DNA database".

A 2013 English news magazine report describes Xiao Chaohua, a campaigning parent of an abducted child, as believing that the authorities could be doing a lot more. Xiao says that buyers of abducted children still often get away without punishment—they usually live in villages and sometimes enjoy protection from local officials. He says orphanages sometimes fail to take DNA from children they receive.

== Ireland ==
Legal adoption was introduced to Ireland by the passage of the Adoption Act in 1952, which took effect from 1 January 1953. Both prior to and after the enactment of this law, children were regularly trafficked for the purposes of adoption, usually to the United States, by religious orders who ran adoption agencies and Mother and Baby Homes. Journalist and author Mike Milotte estimates that as many as 4,000 such illegal adoptions took place, from the 1940s to the 1970s.

== Malaysia ==
In 2005 in Malaysia, baby-selling rings were believed by some to be "thriving", although this activity was still considered criminal. A 2016 report by Al Jazeera exposed that baby selling was ongoing in Malaysia for a long time, with the babies brought in from countries like Thailand and Cambodia. Some babies will be bought by couples desperate to start a family, while other babies are sold to traffickers and forced to become sex slaves or beggars. Prostitution rings also offer babies from their foreign sex workers who get pregnant with some of the sex workers even willing to contact any couples by themselves to offer their babies as Malaysian laws does not allow migrant workers to bear children in the country.

== United Kingdom ==
Lawrence Stone reported some attempted sales of children accompanying wives sold by husbands to new husbands, one in 1815 and another discussed in 1763. (Wife sale in England was illegal but believed to be lawful and widely practiced in southern England and the Midlands.)

Historian E. P. Thompson reported a sale of two children with a sale of a wife to an American in 1865 for £25 per child (the wife being sold for another £100). In atypical cases, a wife and four children were sold for a shilling each, apparently to preclude an expulsion to be forced by poor law officials, and a wife and child, born after she started living with her lover but before the sale, were sold. In another case, a wife and baby about a year old were sold at an auction, where the selling husband said, "[c]ome on wi' yer bids, and if yer gies me a good price fer the ooman, I'll gie yer the young kid inter the bargain.... I'll tell thee wot, Jack ... if thee't mak it up three gallons o' drink, her's thine, I'll ax thee naught fer the babby, an' the halter's worth a quart. Come, say shillins!" In various cases, when wife sales split families, it appears that the youngest children went with mothers and older children went with fathers.

Procedures for selling children were often like those for selling wives when they relied on the contractual method, even if the contract was not legally enforceable.

== United States ==
Georgia Tann, of Memphis, Tennessee, was employed by the Tennessee Children's Home Society. According to reporter Barbara Bisantz Raymond, Tann, in 1924–1950, stole many children and sold 5,000 children, most or all of them white. The children were adopted by families in exchange for substantial fees (ostensibly for transport and hotel but Tann charged multiple times for a single trip and collected the money personally rather than through the Tennessee Children's Home Society) and processed the adoptions without investigating adoptive parents except for their wealth. Amounts charged for adoptions ranged from $700 to $10,000 when "reputable agencies ... [charged] almost nothing". Tann, in a 1944 speech accusing others of unlicensed adoption placements, did not admit selling children herself.

According to Raymond, Tann made adoption socially acceptable. Previously, when the first U.S. state adoption law was passed in 1851, adoption was "not immediately popular". Early in the 20th century, adoption was "rare". Low-income birth parents from whom children were taken were generally considered genetically inferior, and the children, considered adoptable, were considered therefore genetically tainted. Before Tann's work, indenture was applied to some children with the duties to educate the children and to provide them with land scarcely enforced, and the Orphan Train Project gathered children and transported them for resettlement under farmers needing labor, using a procedure akin to a slave auction. Some children's custody was changed "through secretive means" between sets of parents, some willing and some unaware. Baby farms, where many children were murdered, sold children for up to $100 each. Tann, apparently disagreeing with the prevailing view, argued (against her own belief) that children were "blank slates", thus free of the sin and genetic defects attributable to their parents, thus making adoption appealing, and providing a way for children who might otherwise have been dead to survive and receive care. Her waiting lists included much of the U.S., Canada, and South America. One person adopted through the Tennessee Children's Home Society was wrestler Ric Flair.

Brokers who sold babies were found in Augusta, Georgia, and Wichita, Kansas. A sale by a midwife occurred in New Orleans, Louisiana, a child was sold twice on one train ride, and one "father ... traded his unborn daughter for a poker debt."

In 1955–1956, attempts to pass U.S. Federal legislation to ban baby-selling failed.

Former Georgia Senator Nancy Schaefer was a vocal critic of the corruption that the Adoption and Safe Families Act incentivized in all US child protection organizations. She argued that the thousands of dollars in adoption bonuses for every child adopted out rewarded such organizations with seizing children from and thwarting reunification efforts with the children's parents.

=== Cambodian children to the U.S. ===
In 1997–2001, Lauryn Galindo "made $8 million by arranging eight hundred adoptions of Cambodian children by unwitting Americans", one being Angelina Jolie. For Galindo, baby buyers, often taxi drivers and orphanage managers, offered low-income mothers (chosen by baby recruiters) money or rice for children, whom Galindo claimed were orphans and for whom adopting families paid around $11,000 in fees. Galindo, saying she intended "to save children from desperate circumstances" and that she felt she acted "with the highest integrity", was convicted in the U.S. and sentenced to a year and a half in prison.

== Other cultures and worldwide ==
In Greece, "babies of ... young women are sometimes sold to adoptive parents before their mothers even leave the hospital." In 2007, brokering was being investigated by Interpol in Greece.

Worldwide, in recent years, according to reporter Barbara Bisantz Raymond, brokers steal and sell children. In France, Italy, and Portugal, in 2007, brokering was being investigated by Interpol.

== In popular culture ==
- Stolen Babies, a cable TV movie starring Mary Tyler Moore
- Mommie Dearest; "Joan Crawford['s] ... Mommie Dearest daughter supposedly came from the Tennessee Children's Home Society" (Note: Joan Crawford, a subject of Mommie Dearest)
- Donna Troy, in comic book fiction
- In Pete's Dragon, a Disney movie released in 1977, Pete, the title character, was found to have been sold to the Gogans, an uneducated family who used him as cheap labor until he ran away.
- In Oliver Twist, Mr. Bumble sold Oliver to an undertaker.
- To Be the Man, the autobiography of Ric Flair, begins with the opening chapter "Black Market Baby"; Flair's parents obtained him from the Tennessee Children's Home Society.
- Broker (2022 film) a South Korean film about two brokers and the mother of an abandoned baby that follows the brokers on their journey to sell the baby.

== See also ==
- Adoption fraud
- Child harvesting
- Child laundering
- Human trafficking
- International adoption
- International child abduction
- List of international adoption scandals
- Trafficking of children
- Wife selling
- Commodification
