= Tennessee Children's Home =

Care facility and former orphanage in Spring Hill, Tennessee

Coordinates: 35.7477°N 86.9312°W

Tennessee Children's Home is a residential care facility for children and former orphanage in Spring Hill, Tennessee, United States affiliated with the churches of Christ.

== History ==
In 1909, Tennessee Orphan Home began in Columbia, Tennessee, to meet the needs of the three Scotten children who were tragically orphaned. In 1934 the Church of Christ Tennessee Orphan Home bought the campus of the former Branham and Hughes Military Academy in Spring Hill, and the next year the orphanage was moved there from Columbia.

Since 1909, over 21,000 children have been cared for at the Home. As with many of the old orphanages, the Home was originally designed as an institutional facility with central dining, central laundry, dormitory living and even a small farming operation to maintain a maximal level of self-sufficiency. The approach to child care was to provide the basic physical needs of children and to offer Christian instruction; however until recently the children received their main academic education from the public schools of Maury County operated by the Board of Education.

The 1980s were a period of stable growth. There were many improvements in both programs and services offered. The number of children served grew throughout the decade. In late 1982, the name of the Home was changed to Tennessee Children's Home. The institutional approach was replaced with family-oriented group homes for the children, with each house led by married couples in an effort to provide a homelike, non-institutional setting. Both spouses in each group home are required to be active members of a congregation of the churches of Christ. Dormitories were remodeled into single family homes, with a maximum of eight children in each home. Central dining was replaced with family meals in the group homes. The family groups now individually carry on most activities like home devotionals, church attendance, housekeeping, laundry, cooking and cleanup.

In 1988, the Home increased the number of children served under its direction by merging with another churches of Christ-related ministry, West Tennessee Children's Home. Continued growth in its service area occurred again in 2000 and 2001 through mergers with Happy Hills Youth Ranch near Ashland City, Tennessee and East Tennessee Christian Services in Knoxville, Tennessee.

The Home has witnessed a change in the type of child needing help in recent times. Today the vast majority of residents are not "orphans" in the original sense that both of their birth parents are deceased, so now in addition to orphaned children, the Home receives children from a wide variety of dysfunctional family settings – including many abused and neglected youth who are struggling with their values and their relationships with other people. Their problems may be emotional, social, behavioral, educational or psychological or several of these. The services the Home now offers are designed to be flexible so each child is treated as an individual with unique needs.

An unrelated organization with a similar name, the Tennessee Children's Home Society run by Georgia Tann, was involved in a baby-selling adoption scandal in the mid-twentieth century. The current Children's Home shares no connection with that former organization other than the similarity of names.
