= National Maternity Hospital =

National Maternity Hospital may refer to:

- National Maternity Hospital, Dublin, Ireland, on Holles Street, founded 1894
- National Maternity Hospital, Chicago, Illinois, US, on Wells Street, 1898–mid-1910s
