= Camille Kelley =

American juvenile court judge

- Camille Kelley at "Farm and Home Week", 1949
- Born: October 13, 1879; Trenton, Tennessee, U.S.
- Died: January 28, 1955 (aged 75); Memphis, Tennessee, U.S.
- Occupation: Juvenile court judge
- Years active: 1920 - 1950
- Known for: second female juvenile court judge in the nation; accomplice to the kidnappings of Georgia Tann
- Notable work: A Friend In Court (1942), Delinquent Angels (1947), Kelleygrams (1949)

Camille Kelley (née McGee; October 13, 1879 – January 28, 1955) was an American juvenile court judge and author. She was investigated by the state of Tennessee for using her judgeship to aid Georgia Tann's ongoing adoption fraud operation conducted under the auspices of the Tennessee Children's Home Society and resigned shortly after this information became public.

== Early life and education ==
Kelley was born in Trenton, Tennessee. She attended the State Normal School of Jackson, Tennessee, before deciding to become a doctor like her father, and attending Rochelle Warford Sanitarium. She planned to continue her medical education in Philadelphia, but instead took over the care of her nieces and her nephews when her brother's wife died. She married Thomas F. Kelley, a prominent lawyer in Memphis.

== Career ==
Kelley said that women and mothers were the only people fit to be advocates of child welfare. In 1909, she founded the Memphis branch of the Parent-Teacher Association, eventually rising to the position of chairman of the Memphis federation of the organization. She then began studying state child welfare laws and child psychology. Kelley also served as the secretary of the City Agricultural Committee during World War I. Although not a lawyer, she worked for years in the law office of her husband, Thomas Fitzgerald Kelley. After his death, and with the aid of Memphis mayor "Boss" Crump, Camille Kelley was appointed and then elected as the juvenile court judge in Shelby County, Tennessee, and served from May 1, 1920 to 1950.

At first, the mayor named Kelley for the bench in January 1920 while Tennessee was still working to ratify the Nineteenth Amendment. The mayor held off on formally nominating Kelley at the time due to questions surrounding her eligibility. He promised he would officially appoint her once the legal obstacles could be removed, explaining that “The appointment of a woman may be a radical departure, but the juvenile court has to do largely with domestic problems, and I consider [Kelley] eminently qualified." Awaiting the mayor's official appointment, Kelley traveled across the country to learn the methods of juvenile courts outside of Tennessee. In April 1920, the mayor sent Kelley's name for approval to the city commission, and she took the bench on May 1st. Kelley was the first woman in the South to serve in this position.

As Kelley initially was an unelected official, her rulings were the subject of multiple constitutional lawsuits by parents whose children had received her sentences. However, in August of 1920, Tennessee ratified the Nineteenth Amendment which granted women the right to vote. And in 1921, the Tennessee state legislature created an independent municipal family court for Shelby County. Both events legitimized Kelley's position on the bench. Kelley was reelected a total of seven times and served three decades on the bench. Known as the "Little Irish Judge," she never wore a judicial robe in court, opting instead for colorful dresses, jewels, and always a flower pinned to her shoulder. She was quoted as saying, "Robes would scare the children to death. They're not so timid when they appear before me and see that I am wearing a flower."

In reference to her philosophy of trying juvenile delinquents, Kelly was quoted as saying, "We try the boy, not his offense. We seek to take away from him nothing but his mistakes." She was also of the opinion that juvenile justice should be tempered with a sympathetic understanding of human problems. Shortly after she retired, she claimed that favorable results were obtained in 85-90-percent of the 50,000 cases that she had handled.

Kelley would publish three books: A Friend In Court (published in 1942), Delinquent Angels (published in 1947), and Kelleygrams (published in 1949).

== Tennessee Children's Home Society ==
Hallmark Productions was producing a movie based on her book, Delinquent Angels, but suspended production after her resignation from the bench in November 1950, in a storm of controversy and charges after the results of a special investigation ordered by Governor Gordon Browning were released.

The investigation surrounded illegal adoptions-for-profit by Georgia Tann and the Tennessee Children's Home Society. It charged that approximately 20% of the illegal adoptions at the home were funneled through Kelley's court, where she would remove parental rights and provide Tann with documents to place the children as she deemed appropriate.

Kelley was never prosecuted for any crimes associated with the home. She died at her son's home at age 75, more than four years after the scandal first broke, from complications due to a stroke.

== Personal life ==
She had two sons and daughter. The daughter died as a child.

== Bibliography ==
=== Essays ===
- The Spirit of the Juvenile Court," Annual Report and Proceedings of the Nineteenth Annual Conference of the National Probation Association (June 1925)
- "Broken Children," "Child Welfare Magazine" (August 1926)

=== Books ===
- A Friend in Court (Dodd, Mead & Company, 1942)
- Delinquent Angels (Brown-White-Lowell Press, 1947)
- Kelleygrams (Self-published, 1949)

== See also ==
- List of first women lawyers and judges in Tennessee
