= List of international adoption scandals =

The following is an incomplete list of notable reports of international adoption scandals, including instances of child harvesting, child laundering, child selling, or child trafficking between countries:

== 20th century ==
Year(s)	Description
1870s-1970s	The British Home Children scheme forcibly relocated up to 150,000 children from the UK to other commonwealth countries, often without parents' knowledge, as uncovered by Margaret Humphreys in 1987. The scandal later garnered international public attention with the 2010 film Oranges and Sunshine.
1930s-1970s	Certain Mother and baby Homes in Ireland, where unmarried women were sent to give birth are reported to have forcibly separated babies from their mothers many of whom were adopted by families abroad.
1949-1976	Forced adoption in the United Kingdom removed children permanently from their parents.
1960s-1980s	Highlighted by the Dutch current affairs show Zembla in 2017, purportedly 11,000 babies were fraudulently sold for adoption in the 1980s from Sri Lanka to western countries, with the use of baby farms to meet the apparent high demand.
1970s-1980s	Under South Korea's military dictatorship in the 1970s and 1980s, white parents in Europe, Australia and the United States adopted 200,000 majority female South Korean children, which is the biggest adoptee diaspora in the world. The European countries included Belgium, Germany, Netherlands, Norway, Denmark. This was a major human rights violation by the military dictatorship as most of the Korean girls were not real orphans and had living biological parents but were given false papers to show that they were orphans and exported to white parents for money. The Korea Welfare Services, Eastern Social Welfare Society, Korea Social Service and Holt Children’s Services were the adoption agencies involved in the trafficking of the girls. The Truth and Reconciliation Commission began investigating the scandal in 2022. The military leaders were linked to the agencies board members and they wanted to establish closer links with the west and decrease South Korea's population. South Korea's Korean Broadcasting System reported on the case of the Korean girl Kim Yu-ri who was taken away from her biological Korean parents and adopted to a French couple where she was raped and molested by the French adopted father. Across Australia, Europe and the United States, the majority female Korean adoptees asked for an investigation from the Truth and Reconciliation Commission into the child trafficking scandal. The Brothers Home was one of the adoption centers that engaged in the trafficking in South Korea and the adoption agencies and South Korean government destroyed tons of documents to hide their activities and gave false identities to the children while selling them. The Brothers Home Facility sold the adoptees to Australia, Europe and North America and they also raped and used the children as slaves themselves. AP investigated adoptions from 1979-1986 at the Brothers Home and interviewed a woman, J. Hwang who was sold to be adopted in North America by the Brothers Home after she was left there by police in 1982 at age 4. Every child earned the Brothers 10 dollars per month paid by the Korea Christian Crusade adoption agency which later became Eastern Social Welfare Society. Denmark was one of the recipients of the Korean adoptees sold by Korea Social Service and Holt Children's Services. Holt Children’s Service was sued by a Korean adoptee in the US for compensation.
1991-1992	Occasionally termed "The Romanian Baby Bazaar", thousands of Romanian babies were sold under questionable circumstances to adoptive parents in western countries, particularly the United States, after the significant increase in the number of orphaned and abandoned children in the country following the policies of Ceaușescu and his subsequent overthrow in 1989.
1990s-2000s	Orphanages in Hunan, China were reported to have bought babies from traffickers with little recorded information of their provenance, before reselling them to other orphanages or families, with many being adopted internationally.
1990s-2000s	Cambodian children were adopted by families in the United States, only to reportedly find years later that the children were disguised as orphans, their birth families instead having been convinced to sell them, and that officials had been paid illegally by unethical facilitators to obfuscate this.

== 21st century ==
2000s	Three Chinese children were removed from families who had violated family-planning regulations, and then sold by officials for international adoption inappropriately.
2000s	Canadian adoptive families raised concerns about the reliability of documentation and their welfare when adopting children from Ethiopian orphanages, following several instances where families of supposed orphans are found alive, or the health and age of the children were not consistent with their documentation.
2000-2001	Cash-for-babies adoption controversy: Two twins are sold by their mother, Tranda Wecker, via adoption agency A Caring Heart, to Alan and Judith Kilshaw of Wales, but Richard and Vickie Allen of California claimed to have bought the children, suing them to have access of the children. The case triggered a diplomatic and legal crisis between the United Kingdom and the United States, prompting adoption reform in the United Kingdom and the shutdown of the adoption agency.
2004	New Zealand current affairs show One News investigated cases in Samoa where locals placed their children for adoption to families in the United States without realising or understanding that the process was permanent and not just for their schooling.
2005-2008	16 individuals were charged in Vietnam for allegedly soliciting children from poor families and selling them to foreign adoptive families. A total of 266 babies were reportedly sent for international adoption over the course of 3 years.
2007	2007 Zoé's Ark controversy: members of the French charity L'Arche de Zoé were charged by the government of Chad after attempting to fly over 100 children out of the country, for adoption by French families. The members claimed the children were orphans from Darfur, Sudan, but it was later revealed that some children were from Chad, with no evidence that they had been orphaned.
2007	Guatemalan officials took custody of dozens of children in a foster home following accusations that they were stolen are obtained through coercion, with many children having already been adopted by families in the United States.
2007	A Haitian centre was forced to return 47 children awaiting international adoption in their care back to their original homes, after misleading families with payment for their children and then keeping them in "inhumane conditions" for months or years.
2010	A US mother attempted to repatriate her adopted 7-year old back to his home country of Russia, by sending him alone on a one-way flight to Moscow with a note claiming she was unable to parent him. This event amongst several others precipitated Russian officials to call for a suspension of US adoptions.
2010	New Life Children's Refuge case: ten Baptist missionaries were arrested and charged with kidnapping 22 children in Haiti in the aftermath of the 2010 earthquake, allegedly attempting to move them to an orphanage in the Dominican Republic. It later became clear that at least some of the children were not orphaned at all, and the missionaries did not have authorisation to act as they did.
2019	United States Maricopa County Assessor Paul Peterson was sentenced for smuggling pregnant women from the Marshall Islands to at least 3 different US states as part of an illegal adoption scheme.
2020	Ugandan officials were sanctioned and 3 women were charged in the US over their alleged roles in an adoption scheme that defrauded adoptive families and bribed officials in order to procure children for adoption from Uganda and Poland.

== See also ==
- Child selling
- International adoption of South Korean children
- Deportation of Korean adoptees from the United States
- Forced adoption
