= Chu Li-ching infant trafficking case =

Child trafficking case in 1980s Taiwan

The Chu Li-ching infant trafficking case (Chinese: 褚麗卿跨國販嬰案) was a major international child trafficking scandal that took place in Taiwan during the 1980s. Chu Li-ching (褚麗卿) and her husband were accused of organizing a cross-border child trafficking ring that bought newborns from single mothers and impoverished families, then worked with obstetrics clinics to forge birth certificates and falsify household registration documents. Through intermediaries, they allegedly sold at least 63 infants to adoptive families overseas, mainly in the United States, Australia, and Europe.

The case shocked Taiwanese society, triggered widespread public condemnation, and drew global attention to the issue of international child trafficking. It also indirectly prompted major reforms in Taiwan's child welfare and adoption laws.

== Background ==
During the late 1970s and early 1980s, Taiwan experienced a surge in child abduction and baby trafficking cases, which caused widespread public concern. A series of unexplained disappearances, from toddlers taken in public areas to infants abducted from strollers, generated fear among parents and drew attention to deficiencies in the country's child protection mechanisms and household registration system. Between 1978 and 1982, numerous children were reported missing under suspicious circumstances, highlighting the growing problem of illegal adoption and human trafficking during that period.

Due to the disorganized household registration system and the fact that adoptions at the time did not require court approval, making private adoptions extremely common both domestic and international. According to Pai Li-fang (白麗芳), CEO of the Child Welfare League Foundation, this trend reached its peak in 1982, when official household registration records alone documented 9,424 legal registrations.

== Investigations ==
In late 1981, the U.S. Immigration and Naturalization Service (INS) discovered multiple irregularities in adoption-related visa applications. The documents submitted by certain adoptive parents contained false information—the supposed birth parents were fictitious, and the listed addresses in Taiwan could not be verified. These inconsistencies raised suspicions of a coordinated forgery and trafficking network, prompting collaboration between U.S. authorities and the Taiwanese police.

In the early morning of April 21, 1982, the police carried out a secret operation in a building on Section 2 of Xinsheng North Road, arresting Chu and seizing a large amount of documents, some of which had already been burned. The material at the scene includes letters exchanged between Chu and potential foreign buyers and an album containing photographs of 130 different infants. Chu and her husband had created a company (凌勵企業有限公司) which mainly maintained contact with the Thai company TILLEKE GIBBINS. This Thai company specialized in finding international clients seeking to adopt babies.

Subsequent investigations revealed that Chu and her associates had exploited loopholes in Taiwan's household registration system, which at the time had many grey areas. By falsifying medical and birth records, they were able to register these babies as if they had been born to different parents, enabling smooth international adoptions. In many cases, the falsified documents made it virtually impossible for adoptees to trace their biological origins later in life.

== Arrests and legal proceedings ==
On April 22, 1982, Taiwanese police arrested Chu Li-ching and 42 others suspected of involvement in the trafficking ring. The group was charged with multiple offenses, including forgery, interference with family relations, fraud, and illegal adoption practices.

In June 1982, Chu Li-ching and another main culprit, Jin Shu-hua (金淑華), were sentenced to life imprisonment for the crime of abduction under the Criminal Code, while Cheng Jung (鄭絨) received a 12-year sentence. However, in 1984, the second trial reduced the sentence of Chu Li-ching to six years for document forgery, Jin Shu-hua to five years, and Cheng Jung to three years and six months. The judge reduced their sentence based on the fact that most of the babies were voluntarily given or exchanged for compensation by their biological parents.

== Suspected victims ==
Since 1998, dozens of suspected victims have arrived at Taiwan, attempting to reconnect with their birth parents, including people from Sweden, Australia, USA and Finland. However, very few have succeeded.

In 1998, the Australian 60 Minutes news show did a story involving Kartya Wunderle with significant media impact in Taiwan. 36 mothers came forward from the media story in hopes of being her mother.

In September 1998, Aimee Butler (Australian) was taken by her adopted parents to meet her real mother. Yen Kan, the birth mother, had spent years trying to trace her daughter.

In 1999, Lucy Gill (Australian) and Hanna Anderson (Sweden) performed searches.

In March 2017, Kimbra Smith (Australian) went with ISS Australia to meet with the National Police Agency, Social and Family Affairs Administration (which is part of the Ministry of Health and Welfare who were the central authority for intercountry adoption in Taiwan) and the Child and Juvenile Adoption Centre at the Australian Embassy in Taipei with suppoprt from the Australian Department of Social Services and Department for Foreign Affairs and Trade in an effort to create pathways for all "Julie Chu" victims to be able to find birth families, have DNA stored for the future, and to support future adoptees who may come searching. She was unable to find her family through media. The Police facilitated Kimbra being able to meet and talk with Julie Chu and another accomplice, Mrs Chen, but neither were able to provide details that could help Kimbra to find her family. One takeaway from this trip was that it became probable that Kimbra is likely of Indigenous Taiwanese heritage, also compounding complexities in the search efforts.

In July 2023, Kuo Downing-Reese (郭慧如), an American flight paramedic, publicly appealed for help in finding her birth parents. She was believed to be one of the infants trafficked by Chu's network in the early 1980s.

In July 2025, Vanessa Miles (王雯), a 45-year-old Australian woman, also traveled to Taiwan to look for her biological mother. Miles submitted a DNA sample to Taiwan's Criminal Investigation Bureau for matching with potential relatives.

== Impact ==
The Chu Li-ching scandal and subsequent public outrage led to a series of major child welfare reforms in Taiwan:

In 1985, The Civil Code (民法) was amended to require that all adoptions be approved by a court, strengthening oversight and reducing private, undocumented adoptions.

In 1993, medical personnel became legally obligated to report all newborns to the local household registration office within 10 days, closing the loophole that had allowed delayed or falsified registrations.

In 2011, private adoptions were fully banned. From then on, adoptions could only be processed through nine government-authorized child welfare organizations, effectively eliminating the so-called "black-market adoption numbers".
