= Gene Tapia =

- Born: March 16, 1925; Mobile, Alabama, U.S.
- Died: April 12, 2005 (aged 80)
- Awards: Inducted in the Alabama Auto Racing Pioneers Hall of Fame (1999)

NASCAR Cup Series career
- 4 races run over 2 years
- Best finish: 134th (1953)
- First race: 1951 Lakeview Speedway (Mobile, Alabama)
- Last race: 1953 Five Flags Speedway (Pensacola, Florida)
Wins	Top tens	Poles
0	0	0

Eugene H. Tapia (March 16, 1925 – April 12, 2005) was an American race car driver from Mobile, Alabama. He competed in four NASCAR Grand National Series races, but he is best known for racing in the #327 supermodified. He was nicknamed the "King of the Supermodifieds."

== Early life ==
Tapia was born on March 16, 1925, in Mobile, Alabama, to Ada and Homer Tapia. When he was nine years old, he attended a dirt track race with his father. His father began taking him regularly to motorcycle races in the mid 1930s.

At the age of 17, Tapia got married. That same year, he was involved in a street fight and the county district attorney suggested that he should leave town to avoid prosecution. In order to resolve the matter amicably, he left Mobile to work as a civilian on a military base in Alaska. Tapia was wounded when the Japanese attacked Dutch Harbor in June 1942.

While Tapia was away, his wife gave birth to a boy named Larry Eugene Tapia in September 1942 at Memphis, Tennessee. Before either parent was able to see the baby, he was stolen by Georgia Tann's baby theft ring that worked at the hospital.

In June 1943, Tapia returned to Mobile where he enlisted in the United States Marine Corps. He served with the Third Marine Division in Guadalcanal, the first-day invasion of Guam, and spent over 35 days on Iwo Jima.

== Racing career ==
In 1948, Tapia began racing as a way to get past battle stress which plagued him after the War. Later that year, he won his first stock car race at Chisholm Fairgrounds in Montgomery, Alabama. He raced in several NASCAR races that season. During his brief time spent racing in NASCAR, he won the Florida state title and the 1953 Mississippi state title. He left the circuit because he wanted to race five nights per week instead of one night. "Tapia was right up there with the best," said Donnie Allison. "He could have made it real good in NASCAR, if he had chosen. But I think his regard for his family and the desire to race more frequently is what kept him closer to home."

Tapia won the 1968 and 1969 World 300 Supermodified race at Mobile International Speedway. The event was billed as the "world's richest supermodified race".

== Later life ==
In 1990, Tapia was able to meet his son. The 47-year-old, who was living in Missouri, was told that his parents had died in an automobile accident. Tapia died in 2005 at the age of 80.

== Awards ==
Tapia was inducted in the Alabama Auto Racing Pioneers Hall of Fame in 1999.

== Motorsports career results ==
=== NASCAR ===
(key) (Bold – Pole position awarded by qualifying time. Italics – Pole position earned by points standings or practice time. * – Most laps led.)

==== Grand National Series ====
NASCAR Grand National Series results
Year	Team	No.	Make	1	2	3	4	5	6	7	8	9	10	11	12	13	14	15	16	17	18	19	20	21	22	23	24	25	26	27	28	29	30	31	32	33	34	35	36	37	38	39	40	41	NGNC	Pts	Ref
1951		80	Ford	DAB	CLT	NMO; 20	GAR	HBO	ASF	NWS	MAR	CAN	CLS	CLB	DSP	GAR	GRS	BAI	HEI	AWS	MCF	ALS	MSF	FMS	MOR	ABS	DAR	CLB	CCS; 17	LAN	CLT	DSP	WIL	HBO	TPN	PGS	MAR	OAK	NWS	HMS	JSP	ATL	GAR	NMO; 17	181st	–	
1953			Plymouth	PBS	DAB	HAR	NWS	CLT	RCH	CCS	LAN	CLB	HCY	MAR	PMS	RSP	LOU	FIF; 16	LAN	TCS	WIL	MCF	PIF	MOR	ATL	RVS	LCF	DAV	HBO	AWS	PAS	HCY	DAR	CCS	LAN	BLF	WIL	NWS	MAR	ATL					134th	80	

== Biography ==
- The Gene Tapia Story: King of the Supermodifieds ISBN 978-0-9725023-0-6
