= Cash-for-babies adoption controversy =

International adoption controversy

The cash-for-babies adoption controversy (also known as the "internet twins" case) was a high-profile international adoption controversy involving the selling of twin infant girls by their parents Aaron and Tranda Wecker, via internet adoption agency A Caring Heart. The children were sold to Alan and Judith Kilshaw of Wales, but Richard and Vickie Allen of California claimed to have bought the children, suing them to have access of the children. The case triggered a diplomatic and legal crisis between the United Kingdom and the United States, prompting adoption reform in the United Kingdom and the shutdown of the adoption agency.

== Background ==
=== The Weckers ===
Tranda and Aaron Wecker were a married couple living in Missouri. Aaron (born c. 1972) was a welder by trade who made his living renovating homes. Prior to his divorce, he had previously been arrested for drunk driving and had a cocaine addiction, although he would be clean soon after. Tranda (born c. 1973), was a former hotel receptionist from St Louis, Missouri. She was married to Aaron Wecker until around 2000. While divorcing Aaron, she gave birth to the twins on June 6, 2000. The Weckers also had three other children, two sons and a daughter born in 1997 or 1998.

=== The Kilshaws ===
Alan (1955–2018) and Judith Kilshaw (born 1953 or 1952) were a married couple from northern Wales. They met due to a lonely-hearts column in the Cheshire Chronicle and had two children, James, born in 1993 or 1994, and Rupert, born in 1996 or 1997. They also had a daughter from Judith's previous marriage, who was born in 1982 or 1983. They wanted to have another child, but chose to adopt a child overseas due to regulations.

=== The Allens ===
Richard and Vickie Allen were a married couple living in San Bernardino, California. They had an adopted son, who was born in 1998 or 1999.

=== A Caring Heart ===
A Caring Heart was an adoption firm run by Tawana Dancy-Dorte (formerly known as Tina Johnson) which claimed to provide a service for adoptive parents that wanted to locate children who were being placed for adoption. It was headquartered in the suburb of El Cajon, California. Beginning in 2000, the agency began advertising the twins for adoption.

== Timeline of events ==
In October 2000, the Allens begin attempting to buy the six-month old girls, who were twins, from A Caring Heart. They paid around $6,000 in fees and renamed the children Kiara and Keyara, according to them. In December, the twins' mother, Tranda Wecker, requested a final visit of them in California, which the Allens agreed to. Instead, the twins were taken elsewhere to be adopted by the Kilshaws. During the next seven days, the Kilshaws got birth certificates in St. Louis, then to Arkansas, where adoption laws were more lenient, to adopt the children, before flying back to their farmhouse in Wales. During this trip, one of the twins became sick, and was admitted to Royal Manchester Children's Hospital suffering from dehydration. The Kilshaws would finish adopting the children at December 22.

On January 16, the Kilshaws revealed to the British tabloid, The Sun, that they had bought the twins after contacting the agency, renaming them Belinda and Kimberly, paying an estimated £8,200 to adoption broker Tina Johnson. Two days later, the Kilshaws were served a protection order by local police, who took the children from Beaufort Park Hotel and placed them under Flintshire County Council. On January 22, a judge in St. Louis granted temporary custody of the girls to their biological father, although the twins were still in Britain at that time.

On January 20, the council lodged an appeal to the High Court of Justice to make the twins wards of court. Three days later, the court ruled that the twins would remain in emergency foster care until their future was decided. On January 24, a judge in the state of Missouri gave custody of the twins to their natural father, Aaron Wecker, although the order had no immediate effect because the twins were still in the care of Flintshire social services. On February 1, the Kilshaws appeared with the Allens on The Oprah Winfrey Show. After the taping, the Kilshaws were served papers by the Allens' lawyer, to appear in court.

Lynn Lisk, who served as the Allens' attorney, exited from the case on March 1 after Richard Allen was involved in a separate child molestation case with two babysitters. Judge Mackie Pierce of Arkansas, who initially approved the Kilshaws' adoption, nullified his decision on March 6, stating that the girls' fate should be decided in Missouri. The next day, the Allens announced their interest to stop pursuing the children after the child molestation lawsuit caused them to lose custody of their son.

On April 9, the High Court of Justice ruled that the twins should be returned to the United States, with Justice Ian Kirkwood stating that "it was not in the welfare interests of the girls to be returned to the Kilshaws." The twins were eventually returned to the US later that month, where they were placed in foster care before a third set of parents raised them.

== Impact and aftermath ==
=== The Kilshaws ===
After the scandal, the couple garnered notoriety, being called "britain's most hated couple", and filed for bankruptcy due to the lawsuit. The Kilshaws also attempted to use their fame to create a "chat show". After filing for bankruptcy, their seven-bedroom home in Buckley was repossessed, forcing the couple to move into a bungalow in Chester, which was later sold off by trustees appointed following their bankruptcy. Mr. Kilshaw lost his job in a case unrelated to the scandal. The Kilshaws divorced in 2006, but in 2009, Judith married again, this time to Stephen Sillett, a homeless busker. Alan later died in December 2018 from a lung infection.

=== Investigation of A Caring Heart ===
The Salt Lake City office of the Federal Bureau of Investigation began investigating A Caring Heart in January 2001 after several prospective parents alleged that the agency had paid or entered into agreements with them to adopt children, only for the adoptions to fall through. The agency's website would be taken down soon after. On March 14 the same year, federal agents searched the agency's headquarters in El Cajon, removing a computer and several boxes. Additionally, San Diego'a Child Protection Services removed three children from the home; it was not confirmed whether or not they were Johnson's. By late April the same year, Johnson had reportedly disappeared. She was arrested at her home in Maple Valley, Washington on February 13, 2003, with the FBI charging her with fraud. They claimed that she stole thousands of dollars from prospective parents and had never completed an adoption. Johnson, who has changed her name to Tawana Dancy, appeared in federal court on March 11, pleading innocent to ten counts of wire fraud. Dancy was later due to stand trial in San Diego in early 2006, but prior to Christmas 2005, all charges were dropped against her, with the judge citing "insufficient evidence".

=== British adoption regulation ===
Although the Adoption (Intercountry Aspects) Act of 1999 has already been passed, it was not in force when the Kilshaws had adopted the twins, prompting then Prime Minister of the United Kingdom Tony Blair, to state that he would stop the "deplorable" trading of children for adoption. In response, the British government soon made bringing in children to be adopted without following their rules and procedures a criminal offense. Additionally, then Health Minister John Hutton announced in March 2001, consequences for people who avoided child protection procedures by adopting children from overseas, stating that they would be liable to a prison term of up to three months, a £5,000 fine, or both.

=== Adaptations ===
The scandal was adapted into a three-part documentary in late 2022, Three Mothers, Two Babies and a Scandal, which was released on Amazon Prime Video in late 2022. Channel 5 also released a documentary, The Baby Scandal That Shocked The World, in July 2024.

== See also ==
- List of international adoption scandals
