= Georgia Tann =

American child trafficker (1891–1950)

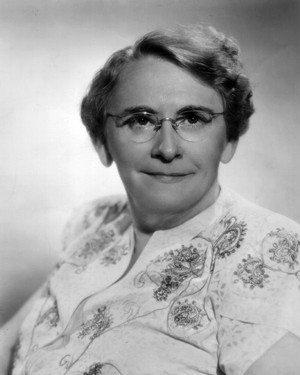
- Tann in 1947
- Born: Beulah George Tann; July 18, 1891; Philadelphia, Mississippi, U.S.
- Died: September 15, 1950 (aged 59); Memphis, Tennessee, U.S.
- Resting place: Hickory, Mississippi, U.S.
- Education: Columbia University; Martha Washington College
- Occupation: Social worker
- Organization: Tennessee Children's Home Society
- Accomplice: Ann Atwood Hollinsworth (Note: Her last name is also sometimes spelled "Attwood".)
- Comments: Died before arrest

Details
- Victims: 5,000 estimated children stolen; at least 19 killed due to abuse
- Span of crimes: 1924–1950
- Country: United States
- States: Tennessee, Mississippi

Beulah George "Georgia" Tann (July 18, 1891 – September 15, 1950) was an American child trafficker and social worker who operated the Tennessee Children's Home Society, an unlicensed adoption agency in Memphis, Tennessee. Tann used the home as a front for her black market baby adoption scheme from the 1920s to 1950. Young children were kidnapped and then sold to wealthy families, abused, or—in some instances—murdered. A state investigation into numerous cases of adoption fraud led to the institution's closure in 1950. Tann died of cancer before the investigation made its findings public.

== Early life and education ==
Tann was born on July 18, 1891, in Philadelphia, Mississippi, to Beulah Isabella (née Yates) and George Clark Tann. She was older than her brother, Rob Roy Tann, by three years. Young Beulah was a school teacher during a time when it was uncommon for women to work outside of the home. Her father, Judge George Tann, reportedly had a "domineering" personality. He also had aspirations of his daughter becoming a concert pianist, and, beginning at the age of five, he put her in piano lessons that continued into adulthood. Nelli Kenyon with The Nashville Tennessean reported that Tann's childhood home in Hickory, Mississippi, was a popular neighborhood gathering spot. Judge Tann would sometimes bring abandoned or neglected children with him, remarking that he would need a minister, school teacher, and doctor to figure out what to do with the children.

Tann attended Martha Washington College in Abingdon, Virginia, graduating with a degree in music in 1913, and took courses in social work at Columbia University in New York for two summers. However, she despised playing piano and desired to become a lawyer as her father had been. Under his tutelage, she read the law and passed the state bar exam in Mississippi. However, her father did not want her to practice law because it was unusual for women. With no apparent desire to get married or have children, she availed herself of one of the few careers available to unmarried women of her time, social work.

== Career ==
Upon graduation, she briefly worked in Texas as a social worker but quit quickly.

=== Mississippi Children's Home Society ===
Tann found employment at the Mississippi Children's Home Society as the Receiving Director at the Kate McWillie Powers Receiving Home for Children. Ann Atwood, the daughter of a family friend, also worked at the home as a housemother; Ann was eight years Tann's junior. She had recently given birth to a son out of wedlock and, around this time, appended Hollinsworth to her name, likely to give the impression that she had been widowed. During this time, Tann would also work as a teacher in Itta Bena, Mississippi, going in September to teach through the winter, either accompanied by another teacher, Atwood, or Tann's adopted baby daughter, June Ann. In 1923, Tann and Atwood spent the Christmas holiday with Tann's parents. It is unclear when they became a couple, but when Tann was terminated because of her questionable child-placing methods in 1924, she moved to Memphis, Tennessee with Atwood, Atwood's infant son Jack, and June Ann.

=== Tennessee Children's Home Society ===
In Memphis, Tann was hired as the Executive Secretary at the Shelby County branch of the Tennessee Children's Home Society. Its offices were located on the fifth floor of the Goodwyn Building downtown. The society was the largest in the state and had branches in Jackson, Knoxville, and Chattanooga. Tann eventually took over the organization, using what author Robert Blade called "aggressive" tactics. In 1924, Tann began trafficking children.

Tennessee law permitted agencies to place children with appropriate applicants. However, to ban the selling of children, agencies could charge only for their services. In keeping with the law, the society charged about seven dollars for adoptions within Tennessee. However, Tann also arranged for out-of-state, private adoptions for which she charged a premium. As many as 80 percent of these adoptions were to parents in New York and California. Records indicate that between 1940 and 1950, the agency placed 3,000 children in just those two states.

"at a time when adoptions in Tennessee cost the princely sum of $7, some adoptions brokered by Tann cost as much as $5,000"

Alma Walton and Regina Waggoner worked for Tann and made a trip every three weeks with four to six babies: Walton to California and Waggoner to New York. They would rent hotel rooms to meet with prospective adoptive parents, most of whom were wealthy. Each couple would pay US$700 in a check made out to "Georgia Tann." Additionally, Tann might charge prospective parents for background checks she had never pursued, air travel costs at exorbitant rates, and adoption paperwork at five times the actual cost. The state of Tennessee itself was contributing US$61,000 a year to the agency, with 31 percent of that money going towards the Memphis branch.

Profits were kept in a secret bank account under a false corporation name. It is alleged that she pocketed 80 to 90 percent of the fees from these adoptions for her personal use. She also failed to report the income to either the Society's board or the Internal Revenue Service. In a 1979 interview with the Los Angeles Times, Tennessee special prosecutor Robert Taylor reported that 1,200 children were adopted out of the home between 1944 and 1950, but only a few of them remained with Tennessee families.

Notable personalities who used Tann's services included actress Joan Crawford (twin daughters, Cathy and Cynthia were adopted through the agency while daughter Christina Crawford and son Christopher were adopted through other agencies). June Allyson and husband Dick Powell also used the Memphis-based home for adopting a child, as did the adoptive parents of professional wrestler Ric Flair. New York Governor Herbert Lehman, who signed a law sealing birth certificates from New York adoptees in 1935, also adopted a child through the agency.

Tann used a variety of methods to procure children. Through pressure tactics, threats of legal action, and other ways, she would dupe or coerce birth parents, mostly poor single mothers, to turn the children over to her custody, often under false pretenses. Alma Sipple, one of Tann's victims, described her as "a stern-looking woman with close-cropped grey hair, round wireless glasses, and an air of utter authority." Tann also arranged to take children born to inmates at Tennessee mental institutions and those born to wards of the state through her connections. To meet demand, she resorted to kidnappings. In a 1937 governmental report by Emma Annie Winslow, a prominent American home economist and researcher, she reported that the three homes for unwed mothers in Memphis, in cooperation with the local health department, had committed to keeping mothers with their infants for at least three months before seeking adoption, especially to complete breastfeeding. However, all three homes reported that, in practice, the Tennessee Children's Home would collect the children within weeks due to "court commitment." Winslow also reported that Tann had the practice of collecting children directly from their mothers at the hospital before the mother was even released, some mothers having signed the children over to the orphanage before the child was even born. Tann said she preferred to receive the children early "before they developed thrush or some other infection" in the hospital. Winslow also noted that, during 1933–1934, while there were no maternal deaths between the three homes, there was a large number of infant deaths due to an "epidemic" at Memphis General Hospital. The author noted that improvements in care in the hospital nursery had decreased infant mortality during previous years, and ultimately concluded that the uptick in infant deaths must have come from "non-resident" mothers from other areas who gave birth in Memphis.

Tann was documented taking children born to unwed mothers at birth, claiming that the newborns required medical care. When the mothers asked about the children, Tann or her accomplices would explain that the babies had died when they had been placed in foster homes or adopted. In some cases, single parents would drop their children off at nursery schools, only to be told that welfare agents had taken the children. In others, children would be temporarily placed in an orphanage because a family was experiencing illness or unemployment, only to find out later that the orphanage had adopted them out or had no record of the children ever being placed.

Tennessee Children's Home Society had been dropped from the Child Welfare League of America because of its repeated failure to have homes of foster parents investigated prior to the placement of children for adoption, because Tennessee Children's Home Society had failed to study the children and their heritage before placing them for adoption, because of the failure of the Society to select proper homes for the children placed for adoption, because the foster parents had been permitted to select the child of their choice rather than placing the children in the home best suited for the child, because the home had engaged in advertising children for adoption and had encouraged hasty placements in disregard of the childrens' [sic] right to protection from commercial advertising, and because the Society had engaged in interstate placement of children at long distances from the situs of the Society which prevented careful home findings and suitable supervision pending adoption.

— Judge Sam Bates

Tann destroyed records of the children who were processed through the Society and conducted minimal background checks on the adoptive homes. As a result, the Child Welfare League of America dropped the Society from its list of qualifying institutions in 1941. Many of the files of the children were fictionalized before being presented to the adoptive parents, which covered up the child's circumstances before being placed with the society.

When an adoptive parent discovered that the information on the child was incorrect, such as in cases of falsified medical histories, Tann often threatened the adoptive parents with possible legal action that would force the surrender of their children. Tann's threats were fulfilled with the aid of Shelby County Family Court Judge Camille Kelley, who used her position of authority to sanction Tann's tactics and activities. Tann would identify children as being from homes that could not provide for their care, and Kelley would push the matter through her dockets. Kelley also severed custody of divorced mothers, placing the children with Tann, who then arranged for the adoption of the children into "homes better able to provide for the children's care." However, many of the children were placed into homes where they were used as child labor on farms or with abusive families.

In a 1947 letter, Tann's attorney, Abe Waldauer, said that the prospective adoptive couple had "complete custody and control of a child for one year; may submit the child to any physical or mental examination they wish and take any steps they may desire to ascertain they have a healthy and normal child. If it is not, the Tennessee Children's Home takes it back without question."

Bypassing Shelby County Probate Court, most of the adoption cases were handled in the counties of Dyer, Haywood, and Hardeman. Tann also had connections with former Memphis, Tennessee, mayor E.H. "Boss" Crump, who had an influential political presence until his death. He had long been known to take bribes from unlawful establishments (e.g., brothels and gambling halls), a fact which Tann used to her advantage. She enjoyed a lavish lifestyle and was widely respected in the community, counting among her friends prominent families, politicians, and legislators.

While in her care, the children were mistreated by Tann, with reports of neglect, physical abuse, sexual abuse, and murder. With no housing facilities, the society held children awaiting placement in public facilities and foster homes. In the 1930s, Memphis had the highest infant mortality rate in the nation, mainly due to Tann. In 1943, a wealthy businessman donated the mansion at 1556 Poplar Avenue to the society. The offices and intake rooms were put on the bottom floor, while the nurseries were upstairs.

The all-female staff wore all-white nursing uniforms even though they were mostly untrained and even substance abusers. The children were frequently sedated, and those who were challenging to place were allowed to die of malnutrition. Tann regularly ignored doctors' recommendations for sick children, denying them care or medicine, which often led to preventable deaths from illnesses such as diarrhea. While some of her victims are known to be buried in Elmwood Cemetery in Memphis, Tennessee, other children were never accounted for. The exact number of deceased children remains unknown, with estimates of about 500 deaths due to mistreatment.

== Investigation and criminal charges ==
At the time, so-called "black market" adoptions were not illegal; still, they were considered ethically and morally wrong. Reasons of the day included the fact that young, unwed mothers were often coerced to give up wanted children, the suitability of the parents was often ignored, information about the child's heritage and medical history was lost, and adoptive parents were unaware of any physical or mental illness. However, by the late 1940s, lawmakers began to investigate these adoptions, and found support in public orphanages that were making fewer of their residents available for adoption. By that time, Tann was the head of the Adopted Children's Association of America.

The Tennessee governor of the time, Gordon Browning, launched an investigation into the society on September 11, 1950, after receiving reports that the agency was selling children for profit. He assigned Memphis attorney Robert Taylor to the case. Two days later, the story was published in the media nationwide, including in the Memphis, Tennessee Commercial Appeal and The New York Times. Public Welfare Commissioner J. O. McMahan accused Tann and her cohorts of receiving as much as US$1 million in profits. Three months after Tann's death, the state of Tennessee sued Tann's estate for $500,000. The case was settled out of court with her beneficiaries ceding two-thirds of her $82,000 estate to the Tennessee Children's Home Society.

The Tennessee Children's Home Society was closed in 1950.

== Aftermath ==
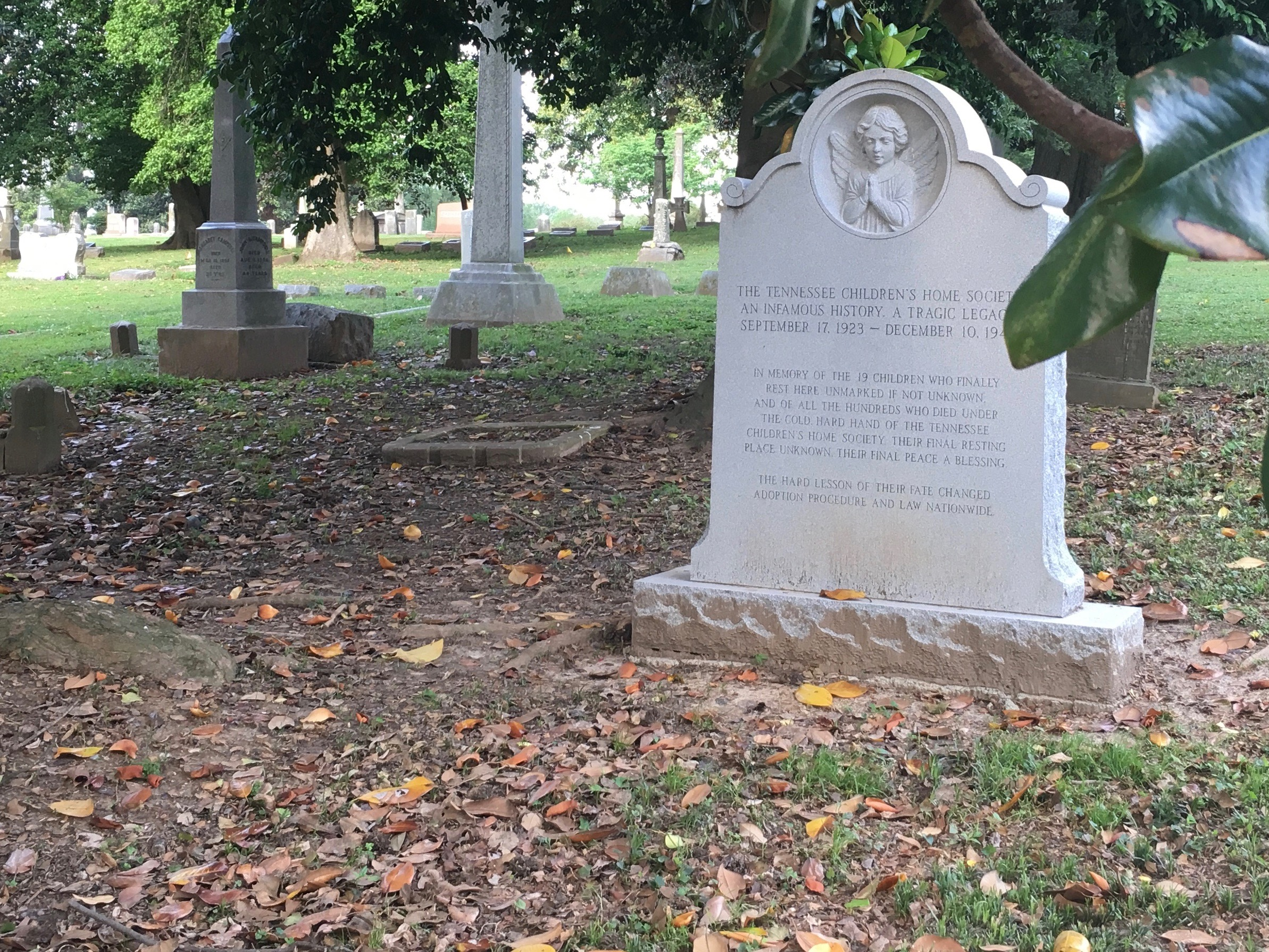
Memorial to Tennessee Children's Home Society victims

Tann is estimated to have stolen over 5,000 children. New York and California vowed to take action, but the children's adoptions were never investigated, and no children were restored. Tann died of uterine cancer three days before the state filed charges against the society, thus escaping prosecution. For her part, Judge Kelley was believed to be receiving bribes for ruling in Tann's favor; however, a 1951 report to Browning by the Tennessee Department of Public Welfare said that while she had "failed on many occasions to aid destitute families and permitted family ties to be destroyed", she had not personally profited from the rulings. She resigned shortly after the start of the investigation and died in 1955 without any charges having been brought against her.

Over several decades, 19 of the children who died at the Tennessee Children's Home Society due to the abuse and neglect that Tann subjected them to were buried in a 14 ft × 13 ft (4.3 m × 4.0 m) lot at the historic Elmwood Cemetery with no headstones. Tann bought the lot sometime before 1923 and recorded the children there by their first names (such as "Baby Estelle" and "Baby Joseph"). In 2015, the cemetery raised $13,000 to erect a monument to their memory. It reads, in part:

"In memory of the 19 children who finally rest here unmarked if not unknown, and of all the hundreds who died under the cold, hard hand of the Tennessee Children's Home Society. Their final resting place unknown. Their final peace a blessing. The hard lesson of their fate changed adoption procedure and law nationwide."

In her book, Rural Unwed Mothers: An American Experience, Mazie Hough makes the argument that the implementation of social work standards in Tennessee without providing the needed funding contributed to abuses in the system. The Tennessee Children's Home Society scandal resulted in adoption reform laws in Tennessee in 1951. Tann's custom of creating false birth certificates for adoptees (which she did to hide the origins of the child) had become standard practice nationwide.

In 1979, the state adopted legislation requiring the state to assist siblings who were trying to find each other, while a bill that extended this provision to birth parents did not pass. In 1996, the State of Tennessee enacted Chapter 532 of the Tennessee Public Acts of 1996, which revised the process of obtaining adoption records by releasing them to adult adoptees of the Tennessee Children's Home Society, upon receiving permission from any living birth parents.

Before the 1920s, adoption was a rare practice in the United States, with the Boston Children's Aid Society placing only five children per year. By contrast, in 1928, Tann placed 206 children with adoptive families. Believing in class distinctions, Tann felt that children should be taken from low-income families and placed with what she called "people of the higher type." Because of Tann's insistence on choosing wealthy adoptive families, the practice of adoption became associated with the famous and influential, removing much of the stigma it previously had in American culture.

The current Tennessee Children's Home, which is accredited by the state of Tennessee, has no connection with Georgia Tann nor the society which she operated.

== Personal life ==
In 1922, Tann adopted an infant girl whom she named June. In her book about Tann, Barbara Raymond recounted June's daughter Vicci, saying, "Mother said Georgia Tann was a cold fish; she gave her material things, but nothing else. I don't know why she bothered to adopt her."

While the cohabitation of two financially independent women, referred to as "Boston marriages", had once been socially acceptable, such arrangements began to be viewed as suspiciously homosexual. In March 1925, Atwood placed an announcement in the local paper that she had secretly married a Captain George A. Hollinsworth of San Francisco, California, and that the couple would be moving there to live. While she began to go by the name Mrs. Hollinsworth, records indicate that she continued to live in Memphis, Tennessee, as before. Tann and Atwood Hollinsworth hid the true nature of their relationship. Tann adopted Ann Atwood Hollinsworth on August 2, 1943, in Dyer County, Tennessee, a legal provision that same-sex couples used at the time to ensure that their partners would inherit their property. Tann died of uterine cancer (Note: According to Dr. Alma Richards on Tann's death certificate.) on September 15, 1950, aged 59, three days before Governor Gordon Browning of Tennessee filed charges against Tann's home. Tann was buried in her family's plot in Hickory Cemetery. Atwood Hollinsworth was the executor of her estate, and inherited the home she and Tann shared, which Tann had purchased in August 1949.

Beginning in the 1930s, Tann began to acquire real estate properties. Some she sold at a profit, at least on one occasion financing it herself. Others she bought to be used as vacation rentals, and one home (in Biloxi) was a vacation home. In her will, she left the majority of her properties in whole or part to Atwood. The others she left to her mother or daughter. She asked that the vacation home be accessible to Atwood for the rest of her life.

== In the media ==
Tann is featured as a villain in the historical fiction novel "Before We Were Yours," a NY Times Bestseller by Lisa Wingate. In October 2019, Wingate and Judy Christie released the book Before and After: The Incredible RealLife Stories of Orphans Who Survived the Tennessee Children's Home Society. It is a nonfiction companion to Wingate's novel.

Mommie Dearest; "Joan Crawford['s] ... Mommie Dearest daughter supposedly came from the Tennessee Children's Home Society".

Missing Children: A Mother's Story (1982) was loosely based on the Tennessee scandal.

Tann was the subject of aforementioned December 13, 1989, episode of the crime show Unsolved Mysteries.

The made-for-TV film Stolen Babies debuted in 1993. Directed by Kim Moses, it tells the story of a social worker that Moses and her writing partners interviewed, Annie Beales, who was the whistleblower on the Society. Beales is played by Lea Thompson; Tann is played by Mary Tyler Moore, who won an Emmy for her performance.

She was featured in an episode of Investigation Discovery's series Deadly Women titled "Above the Law", which aired on September 13, 2013.

She was the topic of the April 25, 2017, episode of the podcast Southern Hollows; the August 29, 2017, episode of the True Crime Brewery podcast titled "The Baby Thief: The Crimes of Georgia Tann"; the March 15, 2019, episode of the Criminal podcast titled "Baby Snatcher"; and the April 30, 2019, two-part episode of the Behind the Bastards podcast titled "The Woman Who Invented Adoption (By Stealing Thousands of Babies)".

She is the subject of Barbara Bisantz Raymond's 2007 nonfiction book The Baby Thief: The Untold Story of Georgia Tann, the Baby Seller Who Corrupted Adoption.

In 2010, Devereaux "Devy" Bruch Eyler published her memoir No Mama, I Didn't Die — My Life as a Stolen Baby to tell her story as a stolen baby and victim of Georgia Tann. She grew up knowing she was adopted but did not know, until she was in her 70s, that she had been stolen from her birth mother—a mother who, Eyler had been told, was dead. Eyler met her sister, Patricia Ann Wilks of Germantown, Tennessee, for the first time in 2009.

Tann is featured in the 2019 novel, The Pink Bonnet by Liz Tolsma.

She is featured in an episode of Stuff You Should Know released on 25 April 2024 called "The Awful Crimes of Georgia Tann".

=== Notable cases ===
In 1990, the Los Angeles Times published the story of Alma Sipple. Georgia Tann had taken her daughter Irma in the spring of 1946 under the pretense of providing medical care; a few days later, however, Tann informed Sipple that her daughter had died of pneumonia and had already been buried. Sipple was devastated by grief but suspected the child was still alive. However, her efforts to find her daughter at the time were fruitless. Years later, in 1989, she happened to be watching Unsolved Mysteries and recognized Georgia Tann as the woman who had taken her child. As the show suggested, she wrote to Tennessee's Right to Know, a volunteer agency in Memphis that reunites families separated by adoption. They soon found Irma, whose name was then Sandra Kimbrell, and the mother and daughter reunited by phone. Sipple's story was featured again in the podcast Criminal.

Professional wrestler Ric Flair (b. 1949) was adopted from the Tennessee Children's Home Society. His 2004 autobiography To Be the Man (2004) begins with the opening chapter, "Black Market Baby", discussing his birth and childhood.

== See also ==
- Adoption fraud
- Child laundering
- Child-selling
- Female serial killers
