= National Maternity Hospital, Chicago =

Medical institution in Illinois, US

The National Maternity Hospital in Chicago, Illinois, was a maternity hospital at 1426–1430 Wells St., founded by husband and wife Doctors L. D. Rogers and Ida Wright Rogers in 1898.

It was notorious for being poorly managed, operated without a license from Chicago's health department, and was eventually shut down by the government c. 1913–1916.

It often kept unwanted babies, and then "farmed" them out, frequently to married women who would claim to their husbands that the babies were their own.

It was closely associated with other Rogers institutions, particularly the also-problematic National Medical University.

== People ==
- Loyal Dexter Rogers (10 December 1856 – 26 July 1935)
- His wife, Ida Wright Rogers (20 June 1860 – 31 July 1926)
- Their older son, Lyman Wright Rogers (6 January 1886 – 10 September 1956), the treasurer and press agent, and a lawyer
- Dr. Paul Burmaster, the secretary

== In popular culture ==
- In 1910, a play named Baby Mine was performed in Chicago and New York, parodying the adoption process.
