= Lisa Wingate =

American writer (born 1965)

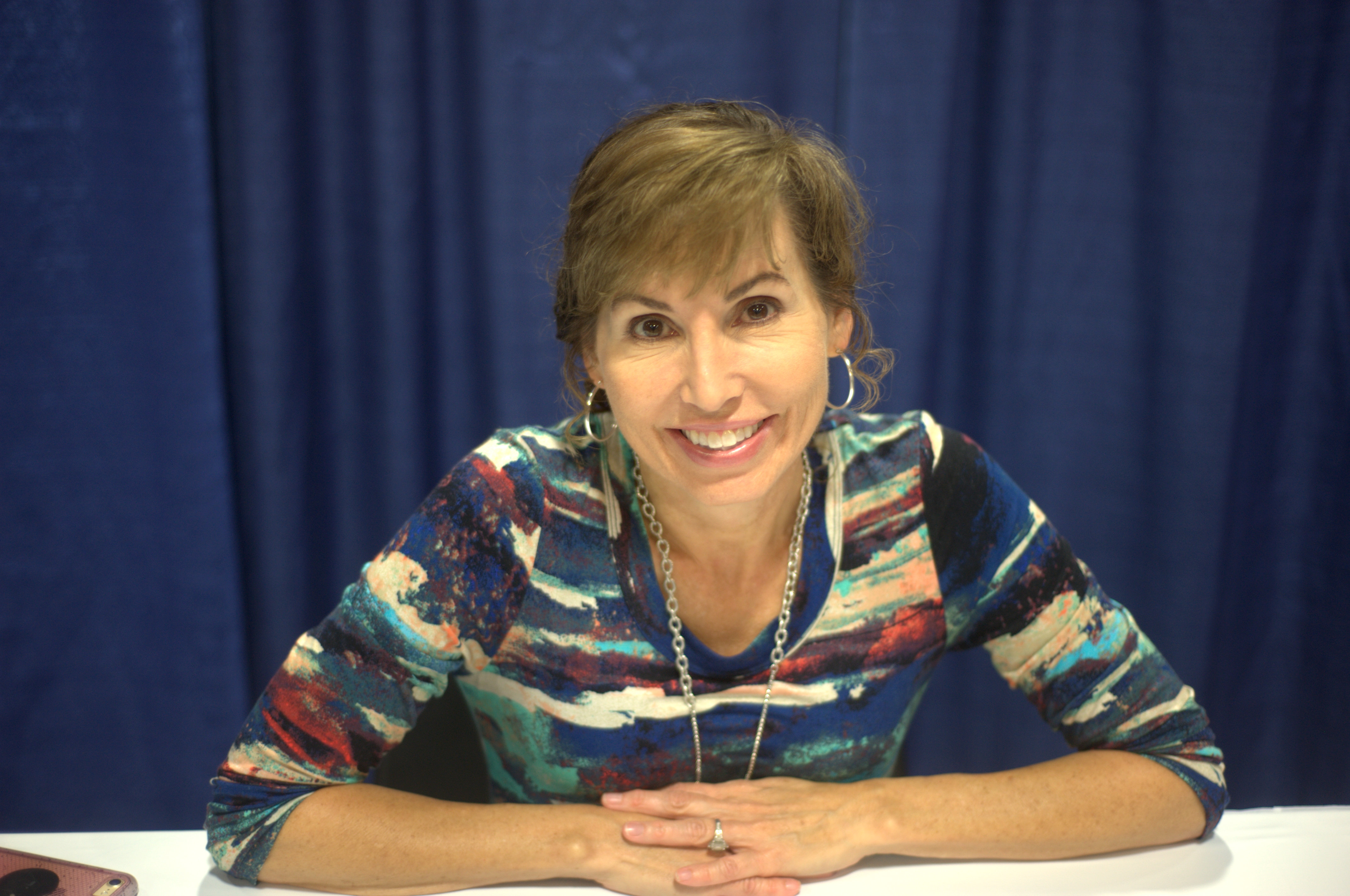
- Wingate at the 2018 National Book Festival
- Born: 1965 (age 60–61); Germany
- Occupation: Writer
- Website: lisawingate.com

Lisa Wingate (born 1965 in Germany) is an American writer.

== Biography ==
When she was younger, Lisa was inspired by a teacher who said she could expect to be a writer someday. Lisa lives and writes in Texas. Before We Were Yours remained on the New York Times bestseller list for fifty-four weeks and has sold over two million copies. Wingate has penned over thirty novels.

The Tennessee Children's Home Society's scandal which involved the kidnapping of children and their illegal adoptions is the subject of her 2017 novel, Before We Were Yours. In October 2019, Wingate and Judy Christie released the book Before and After: The Incredible Real-Life Stories of Orphans Who Survived the Tennessee Children's Home Society. It is a nonfiction companion to Wingate's novel.

== Awards ==
- Pat Conroy Southern Book Prize.
- Oklahoma Book Award.
- RT Booklovers Reviewer's Choice Award.
- 2017 Goodreads Choice Award winner for historical fiction for Before We Were Yours.
- Before and After was a finalist for the 2019 Goodreads Choice Award for Non-Fiction History and Biography.

== Works ==
=== Novels ===
- Tending Roses books
  - Tending Roses (2001)
  - Good Hope Road (2003)
  - The Language of Sycamores (2005)
  - Drenched in Light (2006)
  - A Thousand Voices (2007)
- Texas Hill Country books
  - Texas Cooking (2003)
  - Lone Star Café (2004)
  - Over the Moon at the Big Lizard Diner (2005)
- Blue Sky Hill books
  - A Month of Summer (2008)
  - The Summer Kitchen (2009)
  - Beyond Summer (2010)
  - Dandelion Summer (2011)
- Daily, Texas books
  - Talk of the Town (2008)
  - Word Gets Around (2009)
  - Never Say Never (2010)
- Moses Lake books
  - Larkspur Cove (2010)
  - Blue Moon Bay (2012)
  - Firefly Island (2013)
  - Wildwood Creek (2014)
- Carolina Chronicles
  - The Sea Glass Sisters (2013)
  - The Prayer Box (2013)
  - The Tidewater Sisters (2014)
  - The Story Keeper (2014)
  - The Sandcastle Sister (2015)
  - The Sea Keeper's Daughters (2015)
  - Sisters (2016)
- Outer Banks short stories/novellas
  - A Sandy's Seashell Shop Christmas (2014)
- Standalone novels
  - Before We Were Yours (2017)
  - The Book of Lost Friends (2020)
  - Shelterwood (2024)

=== Non-fiction ===
- Before and After, with Judy Christie (2019)
