= Tennessee Children's Home Society =

Former orphanage in Tennessee, United States

- Key people: Georgia Tann
- Location: Memphis, Jackson, Knoxville, and Chattanooga, Tennessee, US

Tennessee Children's Home Society was a chain of orphanages that operated in the state of Tennessee during the first half of the twentieth century. It is most often associated with Georgia Tann, its Memphis branch operator and child trafficker who was involved in the kidnapping of children and their illegal adoptions.

== History ==
The Tennessee Children's Home Society was chartered as a non-profit corporation in 1897. In 1913, the Secretary of State granted the society a second charter. The Society received community support from organizations that supported its mission of "the support, maintenance, care, and welfare of white children under seven years of age admitted to [its] custody." The state of Tennessee appropriated funds for the home in its annual budget and, as a result, the home was subject to several state regulations. According to the Tennessee Statutes of 1919, the Tennessee Children's Home Society would receive funding in the amount of $75 per child, per year with a maximum capacity of one child per 5000 residents. The home was permitted to take on more children if the local county could pay the $75 appropriation and if there were sufficient space in the orphanage for the child. By law, children who were admitted had to have a certificate of health, were wards of the home until 18, and could not be removed from the orphanage unless it was in the best interest of the child to be placed elsewhere, and such placement was approved by the home and/or state. Additionally, every child received in the home had to be reported to the state comptroller along with the child's date of admission, age, sex, and general condition. According to the state, these regulations were put in place "for the benefit and protection of children."

In 1923, Mrs. Isaac Reese replaced Mrs Claude D. Sullivan as director, after the latter resigned. She was succeeded by Mrs. Fannie B. Elrod in 1926.

== Nashville branch ==
In 1938, Fannie B. Elrod was the superintendent of the Nashville branch. In 1929, noted criminologist Walter Reckless published the article "A Sociological Case Study of a Foster Child", in the June issue of The Journal of Educational Sociology. The article analyzed the behavioral traits of a foster child who was a ward of the Tennessee Children's Home Society in Nashville.

== Memphis branch ==
The Memphis branch was located in a mansion on 1556 Poplar Street.

=== Questionable practices ===
Georgia Tann's place in Memphis society and her connections throughout the community helped her build a strong network of supporters, including Tennessee legislators, socially prominent families and Camille Kelley, the Shelby County Family Court Judge through which many of the Society's adoptions were finalized.

In 1941 the Society lost its endorsement from the Child Welfare League of America when it was discovered that Tann's organization routinely destroyed most of the paperwork associated with its child placements. Tann argued that since Tennessee adoptions were shielded by privacy laws, the Society was not in violation of any practice. Still, the Society remained unlicensed under Tennessee law, the Board claiming that the Society received its mandate directly from the Tennessee State Legislature.

Tann lived well – the Society covered her living expenses. However, the public thought it odd that the head of a charitable organization that could barely balance its books was chauffeured about in expensive Packard limousines.

Throughout the 1940s, questions began to build about the operation of the Society and its closed Board of Trustees. By 1950, families that had used the Society to adopt children, along with those who had lost their children while in the Society's temporary custody, finally gained the attention of state authorities, who placed the operation under investigation.

=== State findings ===
Following a 1950 state investigation, it was revealed that Tann had arranged for thousands of adoptions under questionable means.

State investigators discovered that the Society was a front for a broad black market adoption ring, headed by Tann. They also found record irregularities and secret bank accounts. In some cases, Tann skimmed as much as 80 to 90% of the adoption fees when children were placed out of state. Officials also found that Judge Camille Kelley had railroaded through hundreds of adoptions without following state laws. Though they were unable to find direct evidence that Kelley received payments from Tann for her assistance, investigators noted that her yearly income could not have otherwise supported her lifestyle (which included a maid, expensive clothes and flowers, and a chauffeur-driven Cadillac). After learning that investigators had recorded an incriminating phone call wherein Kelley attempted to bribe a potential witness, Kelley announced on November 10 that she would retire after 30 years on the bench.

Adoptive parents soon discovered that the biographies and child histories supplied by Tann were false. In some cases, Tann obtained babies from state mental hospital patients and hid the information from adoptive parents.

Children disappeared from the Tennessee Children's Home Society under temporary custody to be adopted by other families, and Tann then destroyed the records.

Tann worked in collusion with some local area doctors who informed the Home of unwed mothers. Tann would take the newborns under the pretext of providing them with hospital care and would later tell the mothers that the children had died and that their bodies had been buried immediately in the name of compassion.

Tann died on September 15, 1950; Kelley was not prosecuted for her role in the scandal and died in 1955.

=== Outcomes ===
The Georgia Tann/Tennessee Children's Home Society scandal resulted in adoption reform laws in Tennessee in 1951. These reforms served to further cover up the actions of Tann by closing adoption records. It was not until 1996 that the Tennessee Legislature passed TN Code § 36-1-127 which opened adoption records to adoptees, descendants of adopted persons, and legal representatives of adopted persons. Adults who come forward with evidence that Tann handled the adoption have open access to records that may have involved their adoptions.

The Tennessee Children's Home Society was closed in 1950 and is not to be confused with the modern-day ministry known as Tennessee Children's Home, which is accredited by the state of Tennessee. The Tennessee Children's Home has no legacy connection with Georgia Tann nor the Society she operated.

In 1991, 60 Minutes reported on the scandal, and the efforts of both adoptees to find their birth parents and birth parents seeking their now grown children. The report also reinvigorated the efforts to open adoption records by both birth mothers and adoptees.

Well-known personalities associated with Tann and the Society include:

- Actress Joan Crawford, whose twin daughters Cathy and Cynthia were adopted through the agency
- June Allyson and husband Dick Powell, who adopted a daughter from Tann
- Professional wrestler Ric Flair's autobiography reported that he was a victim of the Society, having been illegally removed from his birth mother (the opening chapter is titled "Black Market Baby").
- Auto racer Gene Tapia had a son stolen by the agency.

=== Memorial to victims ===
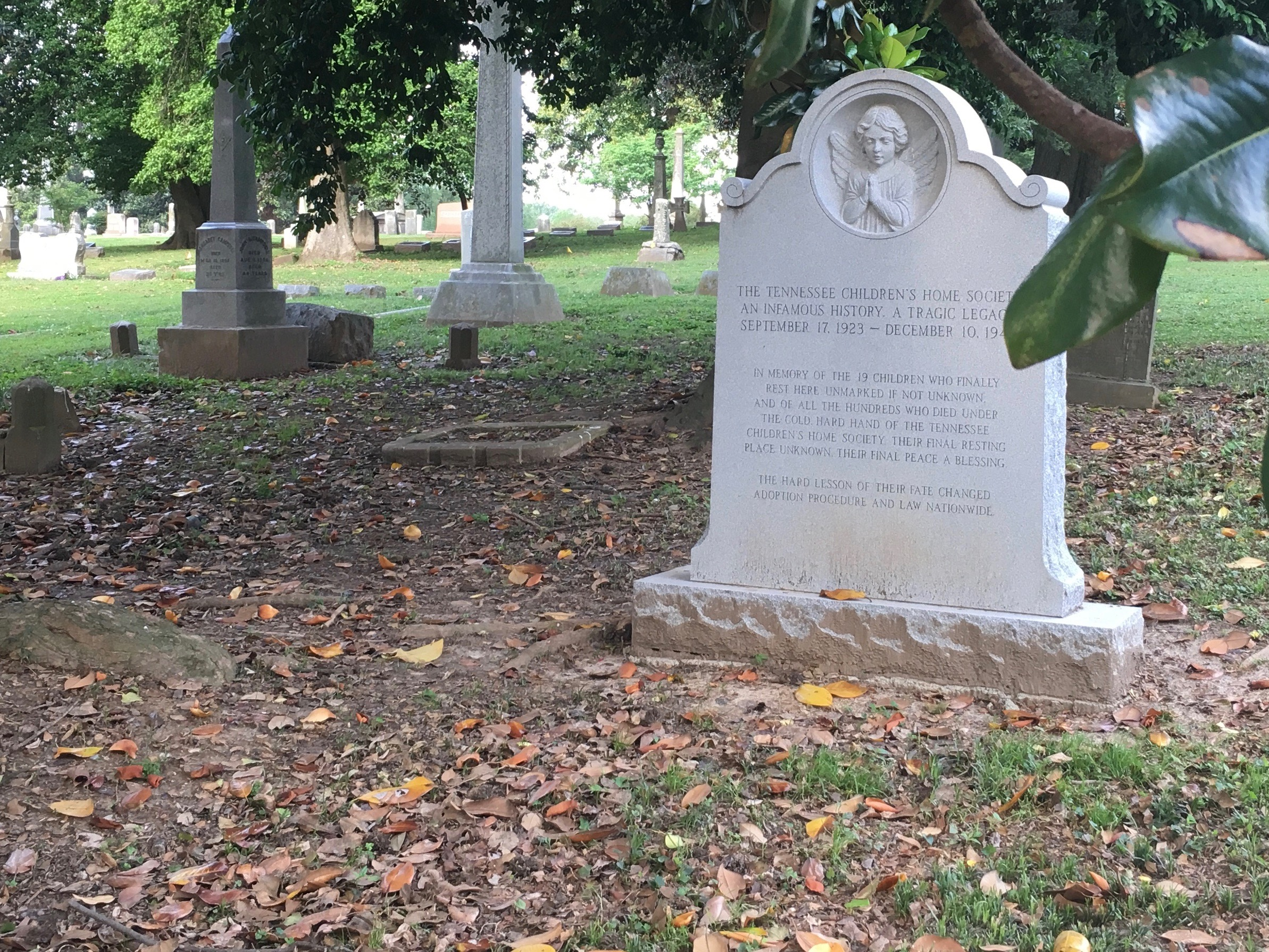
Memorial to Tennessee Children's Home Society victims

Over several decades, nineteen of the children who died at the Tennessee Children's Home Society under the care of Georgia Tann were buried in a 14 by 13 feet (4.3 m × 4.0 m) lot at the historic Elmwood Cemetery (Memphis, Tennessee) with no headstones. Tann bought the lot sometime before 1923 and recorded the children there by their first names, "Baby Estelle," "Baby Joseph" and so on. In 2015, the cemetery raised $13,000 to erect a monument to their memory. It reads, in part, "In memory of the 19 children who finally rest here unmarked if not unknown, and of all the hundreds who died under the cold, hard hand of the Tennessee Children's Home Society. Their final resting place unknown. Their final peace a blessing. The hard lesson of their fate changed adoption procedure and law nationwide."

There is also a memorial in Spring Hill Cemetery in Madison, Tennessee. Twenty plots were purchased in the early part of the 1900s; however, only one child was ever buried there. That burial took place in 1914.

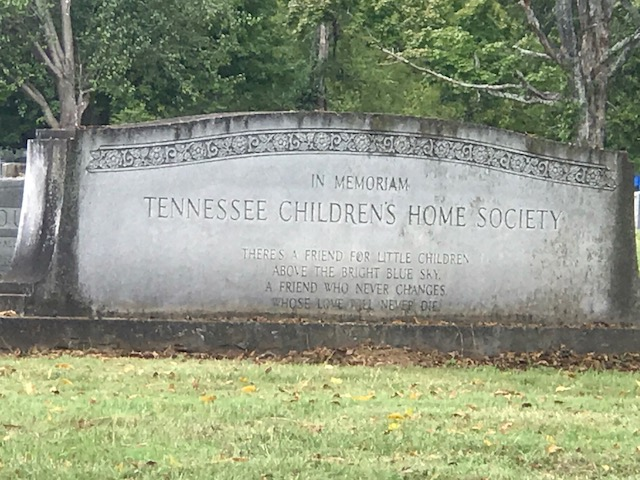
Memorial to Tennessee Children's Home Society

The scandal was the subject of two-made-for-television films, Missing Children and Stolen Babies.

The scandal is the subject of the nonfiction book, The Baby Thief, The Untold Story of Georgia Tann, the Baby Seller Who Corrupted Adoption, by Barbara Bisantz Raymond.

In 2010, Deveraux Eyler published her memoir to tell her story as a stolen baby, victim of Georgia Tann. Devereaux "Devy" Bruch Eyler grew up knowing she was adopted. But she didn't know, until she was in her 70s, that she had been stolen from her birth mother, who had been told she was dead. Devy met her sister, Patricia Ann Wilks of Germantown, Tennessee, for the first time in 2009.

The scandal is also the subject of the novel Before We Were Yours by Lisa Wingate.

== See also ==
- Child laundering
- Child-selling

== Citations ==
=== Works cited ===
- Shannon, Robert Thomas, ed. (1917). A Compilation of the Tennessee Statutes of a General Public Nature, in Force on the First Day of January, 1919. Tenn., Tennessee law book publishing Company.

=== General references ===
- Barbara Raymond. The Baby Thief: The Untold Story of Georgia Tann, the Baby Seller Who Corrupted Adoption.2007. 320p. Carroll & Graf.
- Profile: Mary Margulis St. Louis Post - Dispatch St. Louis, Mo.: May 10, 1993. pg. 1 Section: Everyday Magazine
- Report to Governor Gordon Browning on Shelby County Branch, Tennessee Children's Home Society 1951, [Nashville]: State of Tennessee, Dept. of Public Welfare
