= Child harvesting =

Sale of human children

Child harvesting or baby harvesting refers to the systematic sale of human children, typically for adoption by families in the developed world, but sometimes for other purposes, including trafficking. The term covers a wide variety of situations and degrees of economic, social, and physical coercion. Child harvesting programs or the locations at which they take place are sometimes referred to as baby factories or baby farms.

== Methods ==
After a child is obtained through differing methods mentioned below, the identity of the child or the parent or both are altered in a process known as child laundering.

=== Baby factories ===
Women can become pregnant with the intent of selling their babies, willingly or forcibly. The facilities where the babies are delivered and sold are known as "baby factories" or "baby breeding farms". They might be disguised as maternity homes, orphanages, clinics and small scale factories. The practice is often driven by poverty. In some cases there is overlap with commercial surrogacy, where the male partner buying the baby also provides the sperm. Illegal street clinics such as this exist in Kenya. A company called Baby101 had a baby factory in Thailand busted by police in 2011. Baby factories operating through social media were documented in Malaysia in 2016. Most of the discovered baby factories have been found in Southern Nigeria, with high incidence in Ondo, Ogun, Imo, Akwa Ibom Abia and Anambra.

Baby factories have sometimes tricked or abducted women to be raped in order to sell their babies. In 2008, a network of baby factories claiming to be orphanages was revealed in Enugu, Enugu State (Nigeria), by police raids. In June 2011, in Aba, Nigeria, 32 pregnant girls were freed from a baby farm that claimed to help pregnant teenagers but would then force them to give their babies. In October 2011, seventeen pregnant women (thirty according to some sources) were found in Ihiala, Anambra, in a hospital of the Iheanyi Ezuma Foundation. Five more baby factories were discovered in 2013, and eight more were discovered in 2015.

=== Kidnapping ===
Organized rings in Nairobi are known to abduct the children of homeless mothers. This is usually while the families are sleeping on the street but also through gaining the trust of the mother. In 1990s, it was rumored that child snatchers commonly roamed the country in Guatemala, which has lax laws regulating adoption. In the 1980s, staff in some hospitals in Sri Lanka were involved in rackets of kidnapping newborns for international adoptions. They informed the biological mothers that the newborns had died and paid other women to act as the real mothers. The state can also be involved in such schemes. During the One Child Policy in China, when women were only allowed to have one child, local governments would often allow the woman to give birth and then they would take the baby away. Child traffickers, often paid by the government, would sell the children to orphanages that would arrange international adoptions worth tens of thousands of dollars, turning a profit for the government.

=== Matching unwanted children ===
Women who have a child or are pregnant with a child which they feel they are unable or unwilling to care for have been approached to instead deliver the baby to be sold to those looking for a child. Cited factors driving this from the biological mothers' side are financial hardship, the lack of contraception access and stigmatization of teenage pregnancies. Immigrant sex workers in Malaysia who get pregnant have entered into such exchanges as it is illegal for them to bear children. Sometimes those approaching them pose as maternity clinics, orphanages or social shelters. Often those approaching them are actual healthcare professionals. Police broke such a scheme in hospitals from Gwailor, India, and Egypt in 2016 and 2012, respectively. Indonesian police uncovered a baby trafficking ring in 2025.

== Markets ==
=== Adoption ===
Child harvesting is particularly associated with and prevalent in some international adoption markets. Factors driving this on the adopted parents' side are a stigmatization of childless couples, the costs of assisted reproductive technology such as in vitro fertilization, and difficulties in adoption such as cultural acceptance, legality, or administrative difficulty.

=== Forced labor ===
Child harvesting may also be involved in situations in which children are trafficked to provide slave labor. This could include in begging syndicates, plantations, mines, factories, as domestic workers, or as sex workers.

=== Ritual sacrifices ===
There have been allegations that some child harvesting programs provide infants to be tortured or sacrificed in black magic or witchcraft rituals; this seems to be a concern in Nigeria.

== See also ==
- Child labour
- Child laundering
- Child-selling
- Child trafficking
- Commercial sexual exploitation of children
- Human trafficking in Nigeria
- Trafficking of children
- Lebensborn
- List of international adoption scandals
- Surrogacy
- Assisted reproductive technology
- Adoption
