= Adoption fraud =

Illegal adoption of children

Adoption fraud, also known as illegal adoption, can be defined as when a person or institution tries to adopt a child illegally or to give up a child for adoption illegally. Common ways in which this can be done include dishonesty and bribes. There can also be fraud if a person receives money for an adoption they never intend to deliver on.

== Prevalence and statistics ==
Accurate statistics on adoption fraud are limited. However, according to government statistics, "603 adoptions were recorded by Greece's courts in 2005, an increase of 20 percent over the previous year. But fewer than 60 of these adoptions were carried out through state channels", meaning that in some regions of the world up to 90% of adoptions may be illegal.

== Prevention and variants ==
Genetics and other forms of identification may help in convicting and catching those who commit adoption fraud. This technology also has the potential to block potential criminals from committing this crime beforehand.

== Consequences ==
In addition to being a crime that is a felony in many criminal jurisdictions (including the United States), international adoption fraud is also an international crime. Perpetrators of this felony may face imprisonment and fines if they are convicted.

== Notable cases ==
- The Adoption of Case No. 6815 Michael Edward Chalek Circuit Court of the 8th Judicial Circuit in and for Alachua County Florida
- U.S. v. Focus on Children et al. No. 1:07-CR-00019-TC (D. Utah 2007). Fraudulent scheme involving the adoption of approximately 80 children from Samoa between 2002 and mid-2005, which led to guilty pleas from four individuals and Focus on Children, the adoption agency. The plea agreement and sentencing led to the creation of a trust fund to facilitate communication between the adopted children and their biological parents in Samoa.
- Georgia Tann, director of the Memphis branch of the state-wide Tennessee Children's Home Society, who used her branch as a front for black market adoptions. An investigation in 1950 revealed the illegal activities of Tann, who died soon after before she could be prosecuted. Many celebrities, among them Joan Crawford and the husband-wife pair of Dick Powell and June Allyson, used the Society for their adoptions, but were unaware of the means Tann used to obtain children. Professional wrestling legend Ric Flair was one of the last children adopted through the Society.
- The legal kidnapping of James Elliott Rossler in 2015. His mother had arranged an adoption through Adoption Rocks before deciding to keep her baby while she was still pregnant. When he was taken in for medical issues three weeks after his birth Cook Children’s Medical Center used child abuse accusations as a pretext to send him to his intended adoptive mother, Katherine Sharp. His parents made The Bring Baby Elliott Home Facebook page to bring attention to their case, which was temporarily taken down by court order until the Supreme Court overruled it in June 2019.
- The Chu Li-ching infant trafficking case in Taiwan, uncovered in 1981.

== Television ==
The Dr. Phil Show had an episode revolving around an adoption scam between a couple and single mother. The couple placed an ad on Craigslist to which the scammer immediately replied. The couple was sent fake ultrasounds and fake medical reports, and received money. With the use of technology, the scammer was able to keep the lie about giving the child to them for more than nine months. The episode informed people about signs to look out for when adopting a child, especially when it is not through an adoption agency.

== US foster care system ==
In 2008, Georgia Senator Nancy Schaefer wrote an article criticizing what she called the corruption of the Adoption and Safe Families Act, which had ended the long-standing legal standard of putting foster care children back with child abusing biological parents. She argued that the supposedly thousands of dollars in adoption bonuses for every child that US child protection organizations adopt out simply incentivizes them to seize children from, and thwart reunification efforts with, the children's parents, which in her opinion is a rarely-reported and rarely-prosecuted form of adoption fraud.

== See also ==
- Human trafficking
- List of international adoption scandals
