= Ashya King case =

2014 medical controversy in England

The case of Ashya King concerns a boy who had a brain tumour. His parents, Brett and Naghemeh King, took their son out of Southampton General Hospital (England) in August 2014 over a disagreement with doctors regarding his treatment.

== Brain tumor ==
King had a medulloblastoma, which was successfully removed through surgery on 24 July 2014. He received further neurosurgery on 22 August.

His parents wanted him be treated with proton therapy, which they felt was less harmful than chemotherapy and conventional radiotherapy. At that time, the National Health Service (NHS) did not provide proton therapy in the United Kingdom. However, it has funded treatment abroad since April 2008 where evidence has shown there to be benefit. In this case, the doctors did not support moving the boy so that he could get proton therapy and, in response, on 28 August 2014, the parents took their son out of the hospital without informing the medical team and boarded a ferry to France.

== International manhunt and court case ==
The same day, an international manhunt for King and his parents commenced, and on 30 August, they were found in Velez Malaga, Spain. The parents were arrested and their son was sent to a local hospital for urgent treatment.

On 2 September 2014, following public outcry against the arrest, then UK prime minister David Cameron called for "an urgent outbreak of common sense" while deputy prime minister Nick Clegg said it was not appropriate to "throw the full force of the law" at the couple.

On 3 September 2014, King's parents were freed from the Spanish prison when the request to extradite them to the United Kingdom was withdrawn.

The issues about treating the boy were brought to the High Court to be resolved, and on 5 September 2014, the court ruled that King could receive proton therapy in Prague. Doctors from Southampton General Hospital said the treatment would have the same side effects as conventional radiotherapy. On 9 September, King arrived at the Proton Therapy Center in Prague, where he underwent proton beam therapy.

== Aftermath ==
In 2015 and 2018, brain scans showed King to be free of cancer. He still has some side effects from the tumour, and is in rehabilitation to improve his speech.

A 2015 report reviewing the case stated that the parents' decision to deny their child chemotherapy had reduced his chances of survival by 30 percent. Reviews also called on health providers to do a better job communicating with parents.

In 2016, following the publication of a prospective phase II trial the NHS decided it would pay for children with medulloblastoma to travel abroad to receive proton therapy.
