= Same-sex adult adoption =

Legal adoption used by same-sex couples to establish family ties

Same-sex adult adoption involves adult adoption—the adoption of one adult by another—of a partner in order to benefit in some way, such as to create family relationships, to ensure inheritance rights and to keep collateral relatives from contesting the estate plan of the adopted adult. It was most prevalent from the 1970s and 1980s to early 2000s, as during that time, many countries had not legalised same-sex marriage. It was mostly used due to same-sex marriage not being available in some countries, to create a family unit, get property and inheritance rights, securing insurance benefits and allowing recovery in tort. Same-sex adult adoption has evolved during the years, becoming less prevalent in countries where same-sex marriage is legal. It is not to be confused with LGBT adoption, wherein another party is adopted by a couple.

== Underlying reasons ==
Before the legalisation of same-sex marriage, adult adoption was used to formalise same-sex relationships. The reasons associated with adult adoption include the pursuit of benefits from partners, such as creating heirs. Since same-sex lovers in most states in the US could not get married, they could not take as heir of their partners. Many LGBTQ members used and may continue to use this as a substitute for same-sex marriage. The motives for same-sex adult adoption much differ from those involving a minor, including those of a legal or economic nature. Same-sex adult adoptions served and may continue to serve as a means to achieve some sort of economic, political and social objectives, rather than the average parent–child relationship. Courts often consider whether the purpose of the adoption is fraudulent or insincere, and might deny the petition.

=== Unavailable marriage ===
Up until the 2000s, same-sex marriage was illegal in the United States, and in many other countries, such as Australia and the UK. Same-sex couples who wished to have the same rights as married couples opted to adopt their partners. Same-sex marriage was legal in some states of the US from the early 2000s, such as San Francisco, Connecticut, and New Jersey. On 26 June 2015, the U.S. Supreme Court legalised same-sex marriage in all fifty states in Obergefell v. Hodges.

Adult adoption has been used as a substitute for same-sex marriage since the early 1980s, where same-sex adults couples who live in states where same-sex marriage is not legal, create a family relationship by adopting their lovers.

=== Creation of a family unit ===
Adult adoption was the only means to legally recognise family relationships in countries and states where same-sex marriage was illegal. Two of the motives for same-sex adult adoption were to legally express their commitment to one another and as a means of giving the adopted individual the states of heir at law. This family unity allows same-sex couples which intend to have children, as the child would be related to both, to be able to gain custody of the child if one partner were to die.

=== Property, inheritance and successorship rights ===
If an unmarried individual dies without writing a will, and has a "child", the adopted child will take all of the adoptor's property. Once adult adoption takes place, inheritance rights are automatic, and no other legal instrument is needed. It is one of the primary purposes of adult adoption, as it makes the adoptees the adoptor's heir. Same-sex couples use this adopting means to ensure that their partner is entitled to take under the will. Same-sex couples have also used adult adoption to protect the possession of valuables, especially following the death of one of the partners. Adult adoption is a technique for ensuring that the same-sex couple inherit the testator's property. In a situation where the adopter is the first to die and there is an invalid will, the adoptee will "inherit to the exclusion of the adoptor's blood relatives. In a situation where the adoptee dies first, "adoption cut off the right of the adoptee's natural parents and their relatives to inherit from the adopted child if they die intestate".

== History of adult adoption ==
Adult adoption was originally used as a means of "establishing social relationships and for inheritance reasons".

Since the early 1980s, the LGBTQ community has used a different approach in order to gain benefit from their partners, as a result of same-sex couples not being able to legally marry their partners. Adult adoption was relatively rare in the 19th century, but continued to become more popular among same-sex couples who wished to have inheritance rights.

=== In the United States ===
In the 1980s, the right to adopt in the US existed only when provided by the statute and has never been recognised as a natural right at common law. In 1851, Massachusetts became the first state to enact an adoption statute, only with the requirement of supervision and approval from the judicial system. This 1851 act allowed adoption of "children" without defining that term, but it was intended that only minors could be adopted. This was clarified when the law was amended within two decades to allow the adoption of an adult with their consent. In 1853, Vermont became the first state to authorise adult adoption. In 1952, only thirty four jurisdictions allowed adult adoption, and increased to thirty seven by 1958.

During the late 1960s and early 1970s, those states that approved adult adoption simplified procedures for their accomplishments, such as (1) "elimination of provisions for investigation of the home"; (2) "elimination of the requirement that the adoptee must have lived in the home of the adopter for a specified length of time; (3) "changing of the provisions for confidentiality".

State adoption legislation became more prevalent and started to appear more frequently after the 1860s, but it became more accepted and practised during the twentieth century. By 1984, all American authorities allowed the adoption of minors, and most authorised adult adoption In 2004, Massachusetts became the first US state to legalise same-sex marriage.

Adult adoption was relatively rare in the 19th century, but by the middle of the 20th century, most states allowed it, with one of the earliest cases being Collamore v. Learned in 1898. Although, same-sex adult adoption could be seen as a restriction when adopting an adult.

==== Procedure for adult adoption in the 2000s ====
The adopter and adoptee had to write an agreement where it stated that both parties agreed to "assume toward each other the legal relationship of parent and child and to have all of the rights and be subject to all of the duties and responsibilities of that relationship". The adult adoptee's parents were not required to consent to the relationship. In California, it was required for the adoptee to be younger than the adopter, but did not specify how much younger. Once the agreement had been written, parties needed to apply for court approval, stating the nature, length of the relationship, reasons for adopting and a statement outlining why the adoption is on the best interests of both parties. The court would then investigate the circumstances for or against the approval of the adoption and either approve or not the adoption agreement. Once the approval is done and the adoptee and adopter have a legal relationship, the benefits of the adopter become available to the adoptee.

=== In the UK ===
In 1986, the UK Parliament amended the English Marriage Act to not allow marriages between an adult and their adopted child "in instances when said child has lived in the same household [as the parent] and been treated by that person as a child of his family". This approach only allows a marriage to take place if there had never been a parent–child relationship. In the United Kingdom, the Adoption and Children Act 2002, states that adoption can only occur if the individual to be adopted is younger than 18 years of age.

== Cases ==
=== American cases ===
==== In Re Adoption of Robert Paul P ====
On 16 October 1984, a 57-year-old man petitioned to adopt his 50-year-old partner, as they have been living together for over 25 years. They shared a "homosexual relationship and wanted an adoption for social, financial and emotional reasons". Specifically, they wished to legalise their financial relationships for "estate purposes", and to care for each other when health declined. However, the Family Court continued by defining adoption as "the legal proceeding whereby a person takes another person into the relation of child and thereby acquires the rights and incurs the responsibilities of parent". The court denied the petition, as the couple lacked a parent–child relationship, and concluded that they were attempting to use adult adoption for marriage purposes.

==== In Re Adoption of Swanson ====
In April 1993, a 66-year-old man petitioned to adopt his 55-year-old male companion of 17 years, in order to "formalise the close emotional relationship" that had already existed between them for several years and to "facilitate their estate planning". They sought adoption to prevent claims on their estates from distant family members. Following their reasons, the court denied their petition as there was no pre-existing parent–child relationship between them. The court defined this as a "violation to Delaware's incest statute", as the parties wanting to enter into this adoption were in an emotional/sexual relationship and there was no pre-existing parent–child relationship between them.

==== In Re Adult Anonymous ====
A 22-year-old male petitioned to adopt his 26-year-old male lover, in order to create a "legally cognizable relationship to facilitate inheritance rights, the handling of their insurance policies and pension plans and the acquisition of a house". They feared their families would intervene in property distribution, as the adoptee's family did not approve of their relationship. The court granted adoption, as consensual homosexual activity had been decriminalised and "the best interest of the child did not apply to an adult adoption".

== Potential considerations ==
=== Irrevocability ===
Irrevocability is one of the reasons why many LGBTQ members choose not to adopt their partners, as, even though the loving relationship may end, the legal relationship remains, which means that an adoption cannot be annulled and the couple will remain legally bound for life. Due to prohibitions on marriage between parents and children, same-sex couples who have been adopted by their partners will be forbidden to marry each other. If the relationship between the couple ends, and the adoptee had already been disinherited by her adopter, they can no longer get the right to inherit from their biological parents, and can only inherit by will.

=== Prosecution for incest ===
In some states of the US, same-sex couples who adopted their partners could get incest charges, as once the adoption had taken place, there should have only been a parent–child relationship, exposing the couple to prosecution.

Until the late 20th century, statutes in the US did not consider sexual relations between adult adopted children to be incest, because the statutes defined incest as having sexual relations with blood relatives. The proposed 1962 version of the Model Penal Code was the first to define sexual relations between a "parent" and an "adopted child" within the definition of incest, and with more than 25 states in the US in 2009 subject to statutes including that the relationship between adopted parent and child is incest, such as Texas, Tennessee, Utah, Ohio, Virginia, etc.

Courts have refused to approve homosexual adult adoption, as adoption is not to be used as "a means of obtaining a legal status for a non-marital sexual relationship... such would be a cynical distortion of the function of adoption".

=== Discontinuation of inheritance rights with natural parents ===
In most states in the US in the late 1990s, the legal relationship with the adoptee's natural parents would end upon adoption between the two parties taking place. The adoptee would no longer be the legal heir of their biological parents and would no longer inherit from them.
