= Forced adoption in the United Kingdom =

Forced adoption is the practice of removing children permanently from their parents and the subsequent adoption of those children, following intervention by the Children's Services department of a Local Authority in the United Kingdom.

In 2022, the Joint Committee on Human Rights conducted an Inquiry into forced adoption practices. The subsequent report, The Violation of Family Life: The Adoption of Children of Unmarried Women, 1949-1976, was issued in July 2022. The Committee took evidence from birth mothers, adult adoptees, academics and adoption professionals. It concluded that mothers were subject to cruel and inhumane treatment and that both mothers and children suffered long term effects. Amongst other recommendations, the Committee called on the UK government to make a formal apology and to put in place appropriate support services. In its response in March 2023, the government declined to issue an apology.

In June 2026, cabinet minister Bridget Phillipson, said the Labour government will apologise to victims of historical forced adoptions in England, following years of campaigning from mothers and adoptees, with outgoing Prime Minister Sir Keir Starmer announcing a full and formal apology in the Houses of Parliament on 2 July 2026.

== Legal framework ==
The government of the United Kingdom states that children are only removed and adopted out without parental consent when it is in the child's best interests to do so and when 'nothing else will do'. There is a legal process that must be followed and the decision ultimately rests with a judge who must decide the evidence against the parents on the balance of probabilities.

Section 31 of the Children Act 1989 requires that children only be removed from their parents if they have suffered, or are likely to suffer, significant harm. Critics have objected that the term 'risk of significant harm' is wrongly taken as the threshold by lawyers and judges alike, giving social workers too much leeway to remove children - all children are at risk, high or low. Julie Haines, of the pressure group Justice for Families, stated in 2012 that "Parliament has given the courts free rein to define the term 'significant harm' within case law authorities and has not deemed it necessary to provide a definitive meaning within the Children Act 1989. There is no check list of harm, no clues as to what the courts could be looking for."

Concern has also been raised over section 14 of the Children and Families Act 2014 which sets a statutory time limit of 26 weeks by which time care proceedings must conclude, unless there are 'exceptional' reasons for an extension of time. The making of a 'care order' does not necessarily mean that a child will go on to be adopted, but if a final care order is made on the basis that the parents are not able to care for their child, it is difficult for the parents to then argue that their child should be returned to their care unless they are able to make significant changes to their circumstances. The child will then require a permanent home elsewhere, the options being placement with other family members, long term foster care or adoption.

There are several studies that discuss the laws concerning adoption without parental consent in European jurisdictions:

- Council of Europe (CoE) Social services in Europe: legislation and practice of the removal of children from their families in Council of Europe member States by Committee on Social Affairs, Health and Sustainable Development, Olga Borzova, Russian Federation Doc 13730 from 13 March 2015.
- Requested by the European Parliament: Adoption without Consent (IPOL_STU(2015)519236_EN) by Claire Fenton-Glynn, King's College London from 7 July 2015.
- In 2021 the UK Parliament's Joint Committee on Human Rights was to hold an inquiry into the forced adoption of babies of unmarried mothers in the 1950s, 1960s and 1970s; parents forced to give up their babies for adoption were being asked to give evidence to a new investigation.

== Criticism ==
=== Unmarried mothers ===
From the 1950s to the 1970s babies were frequently taken away from unmarried mothers without any other reason simply because unmarried mothers were considered unsuitable parents. The Catholic Church, Church of England and the Salvation Army ran “mother and baby homes” and UK adoption agencies.

=== National politicians ===
Former British Member of Parliament John Hemming is a long-standing and vocal critic of the system and estimates that "over 1,000" of the 1,360 adoptions carried out without the parents' consent in 2010 may have been undertaken "wrongly". Hemming has been subject to criticism in turn that he does not explain how he is able to make this assertion and on what criteria he judges such adoptions to have been 'wrong'. For example, Martin Narey, ministerial adviser on adoption and former chief executive of Barnardo's, disagreed, stating, "Overwhelmingly in all the cases that I have looked at, in all the research I have read I don't think there's anything to suggest that a significant proportion of those are inappropriate".

The practice of "forced adoption" has been criticised by the press, with parallels drawn between the current policy of the UK Government and those of the policy of forced adoption in Australia in the 20th Century. There have been reported cases which have drawn significant criticism from the judiciary; for example, Lord Justice Aikens described the way social workers had acted in the case before him as being more suited to "Stalin's Russia or Mao's China than the West of England".

However, concerns have also been raised at the way in which the critics of the current system have expressed their views which many fear are based on either misunderstanding or deliberate misinformation. For example, see the investigation carried out by legal blogger Carl Gardener into the activities of Hemming and journalist Christopher Booker.

=== International ===
The practice has drawn international criticism, with the Slovak government, Nigerian parliament and the French High Commissioner raising their concerns. Every European country has a mechanism which permits adoption without parental consent, but it is clear that England and Wales is the jurisdiction which most frequently resorts to such orders.

The government of Slovakia threatened to take a case to the European Court of Human Rights, after the children of a Slovak couple resident in the UK were taken into care following concerns about one of the children's injuries. The children were soon to be adopted in the UK, but the Slovak government had favoured placing the children with a grandmother in Slovakia, where they were eventually returned. However, despite various challenges in the European Court over the years, the system in England and Wales has been found to be compliant with the requirements of the European Convention of Human Rights.

The European Union Committee on Petitions made a fact-finding visit to London to discuss petitions related to adoptions in November 2015, to exchange views with relevant stakeholders on the petitions related to interventions by the UK authorities on issues of parental responsibility and allegedly abusive decisions on adoption and the placing of children in foster care without the consent of biological parents.

=== Affected families ===
From about 2007, a large and growing number of families impacted by the policy have begun to organise against the perceived injustice, often utilizing mass-communications tools such as social media. Some families have left the United Kingdom to avoid having their children removed; some are aided by advocacy groups which assist parents at risk of losing custody to travel to countries such as Ireland and France.

However, there is concern expressed by many lawyers, academics and social workers, that the activities of those who purport to 'help' vulnerable families is misguided and potentially dangerous given that parents are often encouraged to leave the jurisdiction without any apparent assessment of the concerns about their parenting.

=== Procedural concerns ===
Families affected by the practice are prohibited by court order from publicly discussing their case on the basis that it is important to protect the child's right to privacy. This prohibition on discussing court proceedings has been subject to criticism and the President of the Family Division has invited discussion and consultation about greater transparency in the family courts, including more publication of anonymised judgments in family proceedings.

The resistance to over turning adoption orders once made, on the basis that to do so is unlikely to be in the best interests of a child, has been criticised by the Council of Europe as based on a misunderstanding of what is meant by the child's best interests.

Over 90% of children forcibly adopted come from families that live below the poverty line who are then placed with middle class families, despite counterarguments that child abuse and neglect is not a class issue.

The argument made by some that individual social workers receive 'cash bonus' payments for taking children into care does not appear to have any basis in reality.

== Support ==
In the defence of the policy of forced adoption the UK Government states that it is putting the interests of the children first and wants to ensure that children are placed in a new home as soon as possible. Conservative MP and Education Secretary Michael Gove, who was himself adopted as a baby, is a staunch defender of the policy. Although criticisms of his approach have been raised by a special committee of peers chaired by Britain's most senior authority on family law, Baroness Butler-Sloss, the former president of the High Court Family Division. Peers were worried that the focus on adoption could break up families unnecessarily.

Former judge Alan Goldsack QC praised the policy calling for the UK Government to go further and to forcibly remove children from 'criminal families' at birth and to place them for adoption. His remarks have been strongly criticised and he has been accused of "criminalising babies".
