= Office of Children's Issues =

United States Department of State agency

U.S. Department of State Office of Children's Issues
- Seal of the United States Department of State

Agency overview
- Formed: 1994
- Jurisdiction: Hague Abduction Convention; Hague Adoption Convention
- Headquarters: Harry S. Truman Building 2201 C Street, NW, SA-29 Washington, D.C. 20520
- Employees: 40
- Agency executives: John Ballard, Director; Division Chief, Eastern Hemisphere Division, Larilyn Reffett; Division Chief, Western Hemisphere Division, Donald Frerichs; Division Chief, Prevention and Europe Division, Elena Corona; Special Advisor for Children's Issues, Michelle Bernier-Toth
- Parent agency: Bureau of Consular Affairs

The Office of Children's Issues is an agency of the Bureau of Consular Affairs, which in turn is part of the U.S. Department of State. The Office of Children's Issues was created in 1994 under the leadership of Assistant Secretary of State for Consular Affairs Mary Ryan and that of her successor Maura Harty. The Office of Children's Issues is divided into three units — a Prevention unit, which seeks to prevent international child abductions; an Abduction unit, which responds to abductions seeks to facilitate a return of abducted children; and an Adoption unit.

The Office of Children's Issues develops and coordinates policies and programs related to international child abduction. In this respect, it is the U.S. Central Authority under the terms of the Hague Convention on the Civil Aspects of International Child Abduction and the Hague Convention on Protection of Children and Co-operation in Respect of Intercountry Adoption.

With respect to international adoptions, the agency coordinates policy and provides potential parents with information on international adoption. It does not intervene on behalf of individuals in foreign courts because, as it claims, adoption is an issue of judicial sovereignty within the country where the child resides. However, it is able to offer general information and help with regard to the adoption process in over 60 countries.

== International child abduction ==
In its role as the United States' Central Authority with respect to the Hague Abduction Convention, the Office is responsible for taking action in cases involving international child abduction. The Office also provides information in response to inquiries about international child abduction, visitation rights and abduction prevention techniques. Like other Central Authorities around the world, it's responsible for working closely with other agencies and Central Authorities to ensure the speedy return of children under the Hague Convention.

The Office of Children's Issues and the broader U.S. State Department has received sustained criticism by parents of children abducted to and from the U.S. and the lawyers who represent them for failing to treat international child abduction as a human rights issue rather than a diplomatic irritant, and taking a non-partisan, impartial role rather than effectively advocating for victimized parents and abducted children.

=== Compliance Reports ===
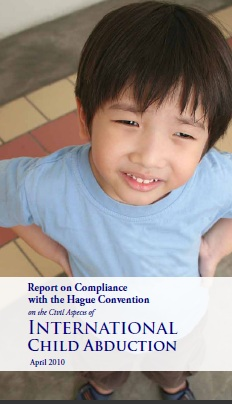
2010 Report Cover

In recognition of the fact that the U.S. State Department would not voluntarily inform Congress, U.S. courts, law enforcement authorities, family law attorneys or the general public about the gross noncompliance of foreign countries in adhering to the Hague Convention on International Child Abduction, Congress enacted an annual reporting requirement obligating the State Department to publish a detailed annual report on the reliability and effectiveness of the Convention in protecting and securing the return of abducted American children in foreign countries. It was hoped that the law would make available a unique and vitally important source of information to parents, courts, governments and attorneys worldwide.

The Compliance Reports have been issued for each year since 1999 with years 2002 and 2003 combined in a single report.

== Controversies ==
In 2002, parents of internationally-abducted children characterized the Office of Children's Issues of allowing “clientitis,” or deference to foreign leaders and laws, to trump OCI's vigilant pursuit of the interests of U.S. citizens. Patricia Roush, the mother of daughters abducted to Saudi Arabia, characterized her interactions with the State Department and Office of Children's Issues as demonstrating “indifference bordering on hostility,” Dismissing the Office as “merely another data collecting, do-nothing, play-dead-at-the-wheel section of the federal government." Maureen Dabbagh, mother of a daughter abducted to Syria, used the Freedom of Information Act to acquire her OCI files and was shocked by “page after page of slanderous, insulting comments made about me and comments trivializing my case.”

In 2003, Joel Mowbray, the journalist credited with exposing the still running "Visa Express" program of the U.S. State Department long after it allowed the entry of at least 15 of the 18 hijackers of 9/11 wrote the book "Dangerous Diplomacy" on the role and culture of the U.S. State Department. Mowbray's second chapter in "Dangerous Diplomacy", titled "Cold Shoulder: State's Smallest Victim's", is dedicated to an analysis of the assistance provided to American parents left in the wake of an international child abduction. It describes State's overriding desire to appease foreign governments and maintain "good relations" as having a conflict of interest between their responsibility to internationally abducted children as the designated United States Central Authority under the Hague Convention. This inherent conflict of interest between the two roles is magnified by what the book defines as the "culture of state", a culture characterized by extreme moral relativism, valuing process over substance and misplaced priorities that reward failures by promotions or high paying jobs "consulting" for the foreign government of the country that they'd previously been paid to advocate America's interests in.

A 2009 US Department of Justice press release reported nine U.S. State Department employees, including at least one Citizens Services Specialist in the Office of Children's Issues, admitted to illegally accessing the passport applications of celebrities and viewing extensive personal information in their applications in violation of the Privacy Act of 1974. The same act that is extensively cited to deny victim parents access to information on their internationally abducted children.

== Special Advisor for Children's Issues ==
The special advisor for children's issues is a foreign policy position created by Secretary of State Hillary Clinton and announced on July 1, 2010. Working with the Office of Children's Issues, the special advisor actively engages with foreign government officials to protect the welfare and interests of children.

Name	Portrait	Took office	Left office
Susan S. Jacobs		September 30, 2011	2017
Suzanne Lawrence		September 2017	
Michelle Bernier-Toth		January 2020	October 31, 2025

== See also ==
- International child abduction
- International child abduction in the United States
- International child abduction in Brazil
- International child abduction in Japan
- International child abduction in Mexico
- Special Advisor for International Children's Issues
