= International child abduction in the United States =

As a result of its high level of immigration and emigration and its status as common source and destination for a large amount of international travel the United States has more incoming and outgoing international child abductions per year than any other country. To address this issue the United States played an active role in the drafting of the 1980 Hague Convention on the Civil Aspects of International Child Abduction (commonly referred to as the Hague Abduction Convention or simply the Abduction Convention.) Although the United States was one of the first nations to sign the Convention in 1981 the Convention did not enter into force for the US until 1988 with the enactment by Congress of the International Child Abduction Remedies Act which translated the Convention into US law.

Under the Hague Abduction Convention the United States is required to fulfill many requirements designed to protect children from the harmful effects of international child abduction. Domestic and foreign parents and attorneys have criticized the United States for its alleged failures to adequately fulfill these obligations on behalf of foreign and domestic families and children and in violation of international law.

== United States Legal System and International Abduction ==
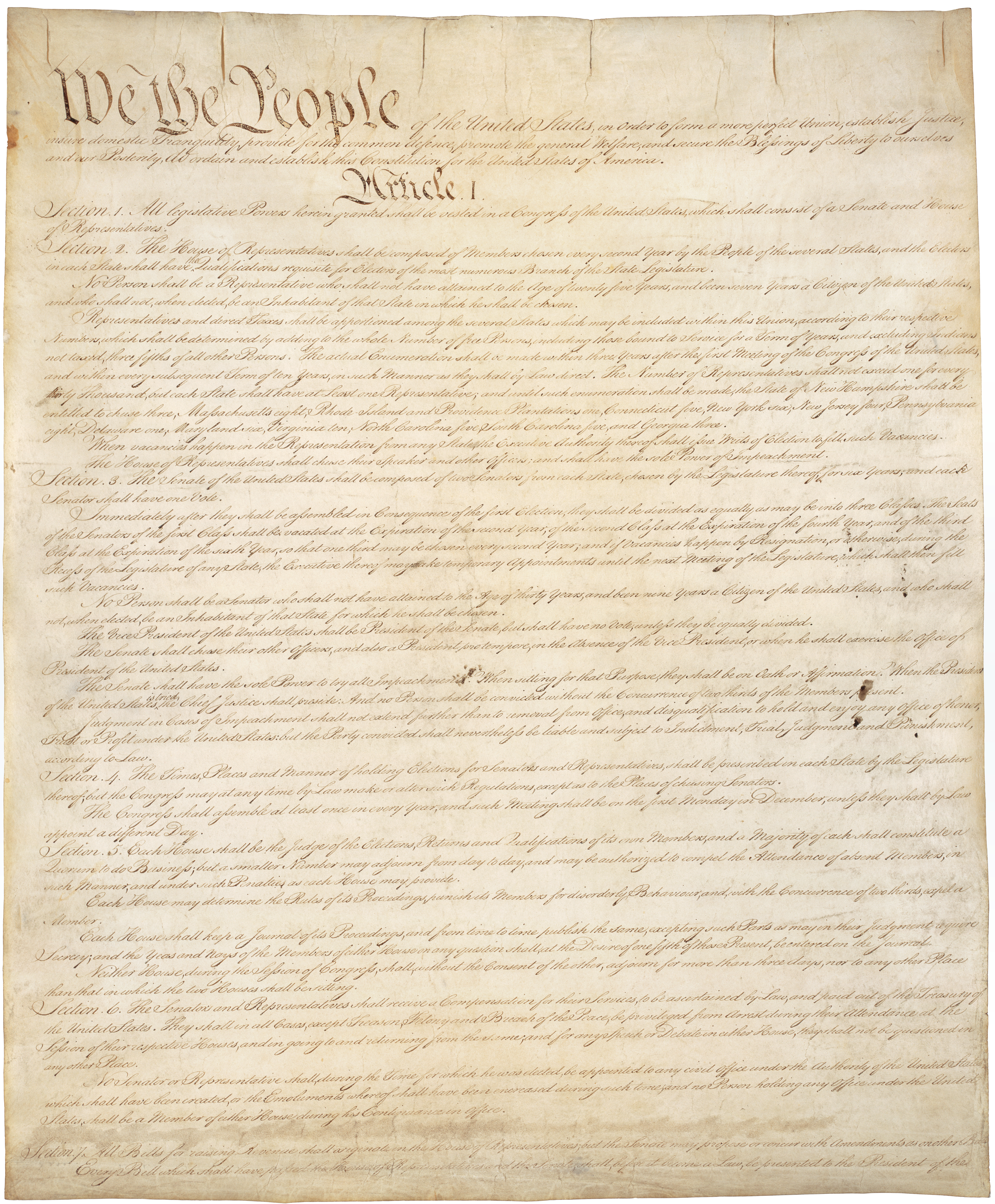
The United States Constitution, the supreme law of the United States

The law of the United States consists of many levels of codified and uncodified forms of law, of which the most important is the United States Constitution, the foundation of the federal government of the United States. The Constitution sets out the boundaries of federal law, which consists of constitutional acts of Congress, constitutional treaties ratified by Congress, constitutional regulations promulgated by the executive branch, and case law originating from the federal judiciary.

The Constitution and federal law are the supreme law of the land, thus preempting conflicting state and territorial laws in the fifty U.S. states and in the territories. However, the scope of federal preemption is limited, because the scope of federal power is itself rather limited. In the unique dual-sovereign system of American federalism. Most U.S. law (especially the actual "living law" of contract, tort, criminal, and family law experienced by the majority of citizens on a day-to-day basis) consists primarily of state law, which can and does vary greatly from one state to the next.

At both the federal and state levels, the law of the United States was originally derived largely from the common law system of English law, which was in force at the time of the Revolutionary War. However, U.S. law has since diverged greatly from its English ancestor both in terms of substance and procedure, and has incorporated a number of civil law innovations.

States are separate sovereigns with their own state constitutions, state governments, and state courts (including state supreme courts). They retain plenary power to make laws covering anything not preempted by the federal Constitution, federal statutes, or international treaties ratified by the federal Senate. Normally, state supreme courts are the final interpreters of state constitutions and state law, unless their interpretation itself presents a federal issue, in which case a decision may be appealed to the U.S. Supreme Court by way of a petition for writ of certiorari.

In 1922, the Court applied the Supremacy Clause to international treaties, holding in the case of Missouri v. Holland, 252 U.S. 416 (1920), that the Federal government's ability to make treaties is supreme over any State concerns that such treaties might abrogate states' rights arising under the Tenth Amendment.

== Hague Abduction Convention ==
Hague Abduction Convention
Convention on the civil Aspects of International Child Abduction
- State parties to the convention states that signed and ratified the convention) states that acceded to the convention state that ratified, but convention has not entered into force
- Signed: October 25, 1980
- Location: The Hague, Netherlands
- Effective: December 1, 1983
- Parties: 101 (October 2020)
- Depositary: Ministry of Foreign Affairs of the Kingdom of the Netherlands
- Languages: French and English

Full text
- Convention on the Civil Aspects of International Child Abduction at Wikisource

The Hague Abduction Convention is a multilateral treaty (in force since December 1, 1983) aimed at providing an expeditious method to return children who are victim of international child abduction. The convention was drafted "to secure the prompt return of children wrongfully removed to or retained in any Contracting State" diverse from their country of habitual residence, and "ensure that rights of custody and of access under the law of one Contracting State are effectively respected in the other Contracting States."

Although the United States was one of the first nations to sign the Convention in 1981 the Convention did not enter into force for the United States until 1988 with the ratification of the treaty and enactment by Congress of the International Child Abduction Remedies Act which translated the Convention into US law. This was 5 years after the entry into force of the treaty.

=== Courts empowered to hear Hague Abduction Convention cases ===
The United States has two separate court systems, a Federal court system and a State court system. Both types of courts have authority to hear a Hague Abduction Convention case, as established by the International Child Abduction Remedies Act. It is up to the parents of abducted children and their attorneys to decide whether to file a petition for return in State or Federal court.

Although the exact implementation varies by state (also because states are free to adopt their own organizational scheme for judicial matters), trial courts are the general court of first instance to hear a Convention case within the State court system.

=== United States legal precedents in Hague Convention cases ===
Since the enactment of the ICARA and simultaneous ratification of the treaty by the United States Congress allowed it to enter into force in 1988, a number of important, and precedent setting decisions have been made on the Hague Convention's interpretation within the United States by federal courts.

==== Abbott v. Abbott ====
The first Hague Abduction Convention case to be considered by the United States Supreme Court revolved around whether or not a child from Chile was "wrongfully removed," as understood by the convention, when a ne exeat order existing forbidding the custodial parent from removing the child from the country. The Court found broad acceptance for the view that a ne exeat right, or a right to prevent a child's removal from his country of residence, is roughly equal to "joint custody" and is, thus, a "right of custody." Accordingly, when the child was removed from Chile in violation of Mr. Abbott's ne exeat right, the child was "wrongfully removed" within the meaning of the Hague Convention.

== United States Abduction Statistics ==
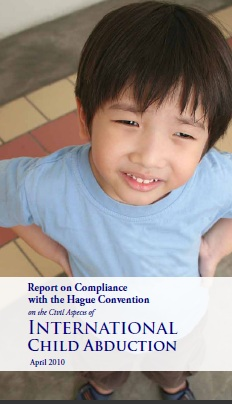
2010 Report Cover

The US State department publishes yearly reports are known as the Hague Abduction Convention Compliance Reports (or: Compliance Reports) in which statistics are presented on child abduction. The publication is a requirement by the US Congress and treats both compliance with the convention by member states and information on child abduction cases in non-member states. The reports highlight countries that they are non-compliant with the convention or exhibit a "pattern of noncompliance." Since 1999, Mexico has been cited every year as being non-compliant or exhibiting "patterns of noncompliance". The reports form the basis for statistics on the United States and international child abduction.

An overview about the number of cases involved is shown in the Table below. The table is followed by a country-specific evaluation of the abduction status in relation to the United States.

2010 Report

Abductions between Hague Convention partners
	Outgoing cases abduction from the US		Incoming cases abduction to the US	
Convention Country	New Cases	# of Children	New Cases	# of Children
Argentina	10	11	8	12
Australia	16	29	14	22
Austria	4	5	4	6
Bahamas	7	8	7	12
Belgium	2	2	2	3
Belize	5	8	1	1
Bosnia-Herzegovina	1	1	2	5
Brazil	24	31	7	9
Bulgaria	6	6	0	0
Canada	74	104	29	39
Chile	4	5	5	6
Colombia	23	31	10	10
Costa Rica	11	13	3	5
Cyprus	1	2	0	0
Czech Republic	3	4	0	0
Denmark	1	2	4	7
Dominican Republic	16	21	8	10
Ecuador	18	24	4	7
El Salvador	13	16	3	3
Estonia	2	3	0	0
Finland	1	2	0	0
France	9	12	12	15
Germany	50	71	18	20
Greece	5	7	3	3
Guatemala	7	12	1	2
Honduras	18	26	1	2
Hungary	3	5	2	2
Iceland	1	1	0	0
Ireland	1	1	1	1
Israel	14	19	3	3
Italy	9	14	6	7
Macedonia	3	4	1	1
Mexico	309	474	75	120
Netherlands	4	7	7	10
New Zealand	7	9	1	1
Norway	5	7	1	1
Panama	10	16	2	3
Peru	10	14	7	7
Poland	14	17	2	2
Portugal	2	2	2	2
Romania	2	5	0	0
Slovakia	2	3	3	3
South Africa	12	13	7	11
Spain	8	9	6	7
Sweden	6	10	5	7
Switzerland	6	8	5	10
Turkey	4	6	2	2
Ukraine	2	4	4	5
Uruguay	3	4	1	1
Venezuela	10	16	4	5
Totals	828	1195	324	488

Abductions Between non-Convention countries
	OUTGOING CASES	
Non-Convention Country	# of New Cases	# of Children
Algeria	1	1
Bangladesh	5	7
Barbados	3	3
Belarus	1	1
Bolivia	3	3
Cambodia	1	1
China	9	9
Egypt	12	18
Ethiopia	3	3
Ghana	12	17
Guinea	1	1
Guyana	3	3
Haiti	5	8
India	34	41
Iran	1	1
Iraq	5	8
Jamaica	16	20
Japan	23	34
Jordan	12	23
Kenya	9	10
Lebanon	6	8
Malaysia	2	3
Morocco	7	8
Netherlands Antilles	1	2
Nicaragua	6	8
Nigeria	9	14
Pakistan	14	24
Philippines	20	25
Russia	16	21
Saudi Arabia	5	12
Senegal	2	3
Sierra Leone	4	4
Singapore	3	5
South Korea	6	7
Syria	5	8
Taiwan	3	6
Thailand	4	4
The Gambia	4	6
Trinidad and Tobago	9	14
Tunisia	4	5
United Arab Emirates	7	9
West Bank	1	3
Yemen	4	9
Zambia	1	1
Totals	307	427

=== Asia ===
Only Hong Kong, Macau, Israel, Thailand and Sri Lanka, Turkmenistan and Uzbekistan are contracting states to the Child Abduction Convention. Of these, Israel has been named several years as having "enforcement problems" in the complicance reports.

==== South Korea ====
South Korea has been criticized for its continued failure in returning the children abducted from the United States. One of the most well known International Child Abduction cases is The Tiffany Rubin Story. Korea became a signatory country of Hague convention with the United States in 2013, but continued to show a pattern of non-compliance in the 2022, 2023, 2024, and 2025. In response to the Hague compliance failures, affected parents from the United States launched protests both within South Korea and in the US. Extensive level of diplomatic efforts were made from the United States Department of State, including an article written by the Special Adviser for Children's Issues and the direct message delivered by the Secretary of State, but the challenges to recover the abducted children from Korea still persist.

==== Japan ====
Japan is -with India- one of only two non-contracting states to the convention to rank as one of the top ten destination countries for the abduction of American children. Moreover, there is a year by year increase in abduction cases. In 2009, 73 outstanding cases involving 104 children who have been abducted to or retained in Japan by parents were reported. An additional 29 cases involve American parties in Japan with one parent denied access to their child. In the 2010 report 79 child abduction cases were mentioned involving 100 children. A State Department official stated in 2008 that no child has ever been returned to the United States from Japan as a result of diplomatic or legal means The official stated he knew of only three cases where children have returned to America, two involving reconciliation of parents, and one in which a 15-year-old child escaped to the American embassy.

==== India ====
India is not a signatory of the Hague Abduction Convention and India does not consider international child abduction a crime. Indian courts rarely recognize U.S. custody orders, preferring to exert their own jurisdiction in rulings that tend to favor the parent who wants to keep the child in India. In the rare scenario that a case is resolved, it is usually due to an agreement between the parents, rather than the result of court orders or arrest warrants.

Cultural factors often impact child custody decisions in India. For example, Indian courts rarely grant custody to a parent residing outside of India, even if both the child and abducting parent are American citizens. Additionally, the courts tend to favor mothers when determining custody.

India does require the signature of both parents for an Indian passport to be issued to children younger than 18 years. India also requires exit permits for children.

==== Saudi Arabia ====
Saudi Arabia is not a signatory of the Hague Abduction Convention nor are there any international or bilateral treaties in force between Saudi Arabia and the United States dealing with international parental child abduction.

In Saudi Arabia, child custody is based on Islamic law. The primary concern of Saudi courts in deciding child custody cases is that the child be raised in accordance with the Islamic faith. Most custody disputes in Saudi Arabia are handled by the Islamic Sharia courts. In rare cases, the Board of Grievances, the most senior non-Sharia court, has ruled on custody disputes.

Saudi courts generally do not award custody of children to non-Saudi women. If the mother is an Arab Muslim, judges will usually not grant her custody of children unless she is residing in Saudi Arabia, or the father is not a Muslim. All Saudi citizens are considered to be Muslim.

Since Saudi women are prohibited from marrying non-Muslims, custody disputes between a Saudi mother and American father would be heard by the Sharia court, which would usually apply Islamic rules of custody. If the mother wins custody, the father is usually granted visitation rights. According to Saudi law, a child whose mother is Saudi and father is non-Saudi is not granted Saudi citizenship. However, even if an American father wins custody of his children, he may still need permission from the Saudi mother to remove the children from Saudi Arabia.

Normally, under Sharia law, a mother can maintain custody of her male children until the age of nine, and female children until age seven. In practice the courts favor keeping children within a strict Islamic environment. Sharia court judges have broad discretion in custody cases and often make exceptions to these general guidelines.

Even when a mother who is residing in Saudi Arabia is granted physical custody of children, the father maintains legal custody and has the right to determine where the children live and travel. In many cases, the father has been able to assume legal custody of children against the wishes of the mother when she is unable or unwilling to meet certain conditions set by law for her to maintain her custodial rights. For example, if the mother moves to another country, the father is entitled to have custody. A court can sever a mother's custody if it determines that the mother is incapable of safeguarding the child or of bringing the child up in accordance with the appropriate religious standards. The mother can lose custody by remarrying a non-Muslim, or by residing in a home with non-relatives. Sharia law allows custody of children to be awarded to the closest male relative of a Saudi father in the case of death or imprisonment of the father, even if the Saudi father has made clear his wish that the children's mother have full custody.

Custody orders and judgments of foreign courts are generally not enforceable in Saudi Arabia. Courts in Saudi Arabia will not enforce U.S. court decrees ordering a parent in Saudi Arabia to pay child support.

Women entering Saudi Arabia with the intent of visiting their children may do so only with the written permission of the father of the children. The father must file a "statement of no objection" with the Saudi Ministry of Interior before the mother will be granted a visa to enter the Kingdom. This includes Muslim fathers who are non-Saudi nationals. If the father refuses to sponsor the mother, or to authorize a child's travel to another country, there is little that can be done to effect a visit. The U.S. Embassy and Consulates General are not able to help American parents to obtain visas to Saudi Arabia without a no-objection letter. Neither the U.S. State Department nor the U.S. Mission in Saudi Arabia may serve as a woman's sponsor. Women visitors are required to be met by their sponsor upon arrival in Saudi Arabia.

If a non-Saudi father wants to enter the Kingdom to visit his children, he can do so by applying for a Saudi visa with proof that his children are living in Saudi Arabia. Saudi authorities may consult with the mother if she is Saudi, who may be able to prevent issuance of the visa.

Some American Muslim parents have considered traveling to Saudi Arabia on Umrah (religious pilgrimage to Mecca) as a means to visit their children. However, issuance of an Umrah visa does not guarantee that a parent will be permitted to see his or her children once in the Kingdom. If a woman is not divorced, the Saudi Embassy has the right to ask for her husband's permission for another family member (e.g. son) to act as the mother's Mahram. If the mother is divorced, the Saudi Embassy will ask to see the divorce certificate before granting the Umrah visa. Women married to Saudis should keep in mind that even when they enter the Kingdom on an Umrah visa, they would need their Saudi husband's permission to depart the country.

Persons who obtain a visa for business or religious visits (Hajj and Umrah) with the intention of visiting their children may face legal penalties including detention and/or deportation. While visitor visas are issued for approved tour groups following organized itineraries, these visitors are not permitted to travel outside the set itinerary.

Before traveling to Saudi Arabia to visit their children, women should consider whether they obtained a complete Islamic declaration of divorce from the Sharia court in Saudi Arabia. Secular, American divorce orders are not recognized by the Sharia courts. Although an Islamic divorce can be obtained from several mosques within the U.S., it has been the experience of several divorced spouses in the U.S. that the Sharia courts in Saudi Arabia will not recognize orders originating from an American mosque. The purpose of obtaining a Sharia declaration is to establish the legal personal status of the mother prior to traveling to the Kingdom. If an American woman is considered to still be married, the "husband" can prohibit the woman from departing Saudi Arabia.

Exit visas are required to leave Saudi Arabia. The U.S. Embassy or Consulates General cannot obtain exit visas for American citizens. Women must have permission from their husband or father to exit Saudi Arabia. The government of Saudi Arabia has been known to issue international arrest warrants against women who have taken their children from Saudi Arabia without the father's permission.

=== Europe ===
Most countries in Europe have are contracting parties to the Hague Abduction Convention, including all countries of the European Union. Most of these countries have never been mentioned in the compliance reports. Germany, Greece, Poland and Switzerland are notable exceptions.

==== Germany ====
The Hague Abduction Convention entered into force between Germany and the United States on December 1, 1990. According to the [compliance reports, 71 children abducted from the United States to Germany in 2009 and 20 children abducted from Germany to the United States during the same period. Between 1999 and 2010 the reports have cited Germany as a "country of concern," having "enforcement problems," being "not fully compliant" or "demonstrated patterns of noncompliance" almost every year.

==== Greece ====
Child abduction in Greece
Hague Abduction Convention
Signature	October 25, 1980
Entry Into Force	June 1, 1993
In effect with the U.S.	June 1, 1993
Hague Child Protection Convention
Signature	May 1, 2003
Compliance Reports
2009	Patterns of Noncompliance
2008	Patterns of Noncompliance
2007	Patterns of Noncompliance
2006	Not Fully Compliant
2005	Not Fully Compliant
2004	Country of Concern

The Hague Convention came into force between the United States and Greece on June 1, 1993. Greece has been cited in the compliance Reports almost every year as either a "Country of Concern," having "Enforcement Problems," or "Demonstrating Patterns of Noncompliance."

Institutionally, the legal framework in Greece seems to support the necessary mechanisms for the convention to function effectively. The convention has force of law and has primacy over domestic law; first instance courts can hear Convention cases under expedited procedures (provisional or "emergency" measures), enforcement mechanisms exist and the Greek Central Authority will provide pro-bono legal assistance to victimized parents during Hague proceedings before the appropriate court in Greece.

==== Poland ====
Child abduction in Poland
Hague Abduction Convention
Signature	August 10, 1992
Entry Into Force	November 1, 1992
In effect with the U.S.	November 1, 1992
Hague Child Protection Convention
Signature	November 22, 2000
Entry Into Force	November 1, 2010
Compliance Reports
2008	Patterns of Noncompliance
2007	Patterns of Noncompliance
2006	Country of Concern/Enforcement Problem
2005	Country of Concern/Enforcement Problem
2004	Country of Concern/Enforcement Problem
2002, 2003	Country of Concern
2002, 2003	Country of Concern

The Hague Abduction Convention came into force between the United States and Poland on November 11, 1992. Poland has been cited in the compliance Reports for every year from 2000 to 2008 as either a "country of concern," having "enforcement problems" or "demonstrating patterns of noncompliance" with the Hague Abduction Convention resulting in an ongoing dialogue between the Polish Consul General and the Office of Children's Issues Director in Washington, D.C. and U.S. Embassy officials and Ministry of Justice officials in Warsaw. Several high-level meetings between U.S. Embassy Warsaw and the Polish Ministry of Justice have been held where Ministry representatives indicated an intent to address many of these compliance issues and improve Poland's Convention performance. Officials from the U.S. Department of State and the U.S. Embassy in Poland have raised compliance issues and individual abduction cases with high-ranking officials from the Polish Government through diplomatic notes, formal demarches, and communications with the Polish Central Authority with former assistant Secretary for Consular Affairs Maura Harty raising the issue during bilateral meetings with her Polish counterpart.

Among the issues cited in the Compliance Reports, there is no specific legislation that implements the Convention in Poland. Unless there is a voluntary return, children normally remain in Poland during the entire Hague process, which often takes years. There is a perception that there is a gender bias in favor of mothers when they are abducting parents. Even though enforcement legislation has been passed, there appears to be reluctance on the part of officials to follow through with enforcement. A faulty translation into Polish of Article 13 of the Convention which radically lowers the standard for refusing returns by saying that return can be denied if it would put the child in an "unfavorable" rather than an "intolerable" situation that some courts still use four years after the Ministry of Justice agreed in 1999 to distribute an accurate translation. Furthermore, Polish law does not permit courts to consider resources for child welfare and protection in the country of habitual residence when asked to consider the grave risk defense.

Polish authorities are often unable to locate the children and their abductors after courts ordered the return of a child. Law enforcement in Poland is limited by the fact that neither parental abduction nor the failure to comply with a Convention return order is a criminal offense in Poland. Consequently, Polish authorities have fewer investigative resources available to locate children and their abducting parents. The lack of an adequate domestic statutory framework with enforcement mechanisms (e.g., a parent who becomes a fugitive to avoid complying with a final return judgment does not commit a "crime"—and therefore cannot be the subject of a fugitive warrant—unless the parent has been stripped of parental rights.)

Refusing to obey an order seems to carry few negative consequences for the taking parent. In some instances, the court rewarded the taking parent who refused to comply with a court order by ultimately ruling that, because so much time had elapsed, it was not in the child's best interests to be returned after all.

Even in cases where the left-behind parent has provided specific information about where the child is located, the ability of the Polish authorities to verify it is ineffective. Further, once a child is located, there does not appear to be any mechanism to ensure that abducting parents cannot further abscond or conceal the child's whereabouts. This is largely due to the fact that international parental child abduction is merely a civil offense in Poland.

Courts routinely order psychological evaluations and home studies. In one U.S. case an abducting parent in hiding was able to protest a return order in court while also collecting child support payments from the government. This situation indicates that institutionally there is a disturbing lack of coordination among local law enforcement, the Polish Central Authority, and social welfare agencies.

The Polish procedure does limit the number of courts that can hear Hague cases in an attempt to allow judges to develop Hague expertise and the Polish Central Authority will provide pro bono legal assistance for victim parents during Hague proceedings before the appropriate court in Poland.

==== Switzerland ====
Switzerland has been frequently cited in the compliance reports as either a "Country of Concern," having "Enforcement Problems," or "Demonstrating Patterns of Noncompliance." In the 2010 report it was noted that: "delays in processing and enforcement often go on for weeks or months years, Swiss courts often treat Convention cases as custody decisions, invoking the child's "best interests" as a reason for denying return, and performing merits-based custody assessments, Swiss courts - up to and including Switzerland's highest court, often show bias toward the abducting parent, especially when the taking parent is the mother". High-level Swiss officials have defended this practice citing the "special relationship" between mothers and young children as influencing its decision to uphold the lower court's denial of the left-behind parent's application for return of an abducted child to the United States. The report also observed that Swiss authorities are reluctant to actively enforce orders granting return to the United States or access to the child by the left-behind parent. Law enforcement has made only cursory efforts to locate taking parent and abducted children.

=== Latin America ===

According to the statistics in the US Department of State's Compliance Reports, as of 2010, 721 out of 1194, or 60%, of the children abducted from the United States to a Hague Convention partner were taken to Latin America with Mexico alone accounting for 474 or 40%.

==== Belize ====
The Hague Child Abduction Convention entered into force in between Belize and America in 1989. The Ministry of Human Development and Social Transformation is the designated Central Authority of Belize and the Belize Family Court maintains jurisdiction to entertain all applications under the convention.

In the 2021 Annual Report on International Child Abduction, the US Department of State noted that "the U.S. and the Belizean Central Authorities have a strong and productive relationship that facilitates the resolution of abduction cases under the Convention." However, this statement appears to be in direct conflict with the reality that left behind parents face when their children are abducted to Belize. Due to unknown reasons of the judiciary, cases have remained unresolved longer than 18 months, a factor normally cited in all instances in which a nation has been determined to be noncompliant with treaty obligations. One delayed case has remained unresolved since 2019. Despite far exceeding the acceptable timeline for resolution of such cases, and in contradiction to policy, the US Department of State has so far declined to label Belize as a country with a pattern of noncompliance.

==== Brazil ====
Child abduction in Brazil
Hague Abduction Convention
Ratification	October 19, 1999
Entry Into Force	January 1, 2000
In effect with the U.S.	December 1, 2003
Compliance Reports
2010	Not Compliant
2009	Patterns of Noncompliance
2008	Patterns of Noncompliance
2007	Patterns of Noncompliance
2006	Not Fully Compliant

The Child Abduction Convention entered into force between Brazil with the United States in 2003. The US Department of State denoted Brazil as a country demonstrating "patterns of noncompliance" with the Hague Abduction Convention in 2008 and 2009. In 2010 the status of Brazil's compliance was downgraded to that of "non-compliant." According to a 2009 New York Times report, there were at the time around fifty unsolved Convention cases for children abducted from the United States to Brazil. The report states that Brazil has a history of non-compliance, and the Brazilian judiciary has a general inability to adjudicate a final and unappealable decision in Convention cases.

The subject of child abduction between the United States and Brazil received sustained media attention during 2009 and early 2010 as a result of the Goldman child abduction case. US Congress introduced H.R. 2702, legislation to suspend Brazil's Generalized System of Preferences trading benefit. The case was also discussed on the US House of Representatives floor with a statement from Congressman Chris Smith (Republican, New Jersey), a staunch supporter of David Goldman, a New Jersey resident; U.S. Secretary of State Hillary Clinton treated the case as a diplomatic issue of Brazil's obligations under the Hague Convention. After nearly six years of litigation in Brazil, U.S. Senator Frank Lautenberg of New Jersey placed a hold on a trade bill which allows certain countries, including Brazil, to export certain products to the United States duty-free. Days later, by a decision of Brazil's Supreme Court, Sean was handed over to his father on December 24, 2009.

==== Chile ====

Chile signed the Hague Abduction Convention in 1994 and it entered into force with the United States in the same year. The US Department of State has denoted Chile as a country demonstrating "patterns of noncompliance" or a "not fully compliant" with the Hague Abduction Convention every year during the five period between 2005 and 2009 for its judicial Performance. Chilean courts delay Convention cases and often improperly treat them as child custody decisions, citing the UN Convention on the Rights of the Child. U.S. parents often experience bias by the courts in favor of Chilean parents, especially Chilean mothers. In addition, it is customary in Chilean courts to order psychological or social evaluations in all cases involving minor children, regardless of whether there is evidence of possible risk to the child in being returned to his or her country of habitual residence. Because the Hague Convention focuses on returning a child to his or her country of habitual residence, the United States Central Authority takes the view that psychological evaluations are unnecessary, and cause inappropriate delays in processing cases, if there is no evidence of risk to the child should the court order the child's return.

Another trend is for Chilean courts to deny Convention applications upon finding that the child is well settled in the new environment. This result, which could be avoided if Chilean courts handled Convention cases more expeditiously, leaves the victim parent with the much less desirable option of filing an application under the convention for mere access to the child, or for visitation, and even these applications in some cases have not resulted in contact between the left behind family and the child. In 2008, a Chilean court ordered a scheduled access visit by the LBP, and the left behind parent purchased and confirmed his plane ticket and accommodations for the trip. Hours before the parent was scheduled to board the plane for Chile, the Chilean Central Authority notified him that the Chilean judge had suspended the scheduled visitation. In April 2008, the Chilean Central Authority sponsored a seminar on the convention and its application in Chile, including topics such as the emotional impact of international child abduction on children and parents, and the role of "network judges" in promoting the correct application of the Convention in Chile. Several months after the seminar, the Chilean Supreme Court designated a family court judge to serve as Chile's network judge for Convention cases.

==== Colombia ====

The Hague Abduction Conventionentered into force in Colombia in 1996. According to the Convention Compliance Reports, Colombia ranks as one of the top ten destinations for the abduction of children from the United States. It has also been cited several times as a country demonstrating "patterns of noncompliance," being totally "noncompliant" and a "country of concern". In cases involving the Abduction Convention, recent legislation by the Colombian Congress has placed jurisdiction with the family courts. In remote areas of the country where there are no family courts, Hague Convention cases are heard by civil court circuit judges. While Colombian courts can recognize or enforce U.S. custody orders, they generally refuse to do so and Colombian court orders prevail over foreign court orders. Colombian courts favor parents of Colombian nationality and it is very rare for a court in Colombia to grant custody to a parent residing in the U.S. when there is a parent residing in Colombia.

International parental abduction is covered in the Colombian Penal Code as kidnapping, with circumstances that can increase or reduce the punishment. Colombia does not consider international parental kidnapping as an extraditable offense.

In contrast to United States requirements, a Colombian passport for a minor child can be obtained with only one parent's consent, though Colombia restricts the departure of Colombian children from the country when they are not in the company of both parents. Although this prevents misuse of a Colombian passport to abduct children from Colombia it facilitates abductions from countries like the United States who have no exit controls. If a parent wishes to prevent the issuance of a Colombian passport to their minor child, they must submit a request to the Ministerio de la Proteccion Social, Instituto Colombiano de Bienestar Familiar (ICBF). If the ICBF concurs with the parent's request, it will notify the Colombian passport office and Colombian Embassies and Consulates to place a hold on the issuance of a passport to the minor child. Parents may only submit a request through ICBF, not through a Colombian Embassy or Consulate.

==== Costa Rica ====

Costa Rica has not ratified the Hague Abduction Convention and does not allow interstate enforcement of custody and visitation orders. According to the US Department of state, Costa Rica is also well known to accept refugee applications from those mothers/fathers fleeing U.S. justice allowing abducting parents to claim some sort of legal problem with the US and seek asylum in Costa Rica.

All children born in Costa Rica acquire Costa Rican citizenship at birth and, to prevent international child abduction, may only depart the country upon presentation of an exit permit issued by immigration authorities.

==== Dominican Republic ====

In December 1997, the U.S. State Department targeted diplomatic entreaties at eight countries whose accession to the Hague Abduction Convention the department judged would be most useful and effective to the United States, one of these was the Dominican Republic.

The Dominican Republic signed and ratified the Abduction Convention in 2004 and it entered into force with the United States in 2007. Since the treaty went into effect the Dominican Republic ranks in the top ten list of countries that are the source and destination of abducted children between the United States.

In their 2010 Compliance Report, the State Department added an outgoing child abduction case with the Dominican Republic to their new "Notable Cases" section. They noted the Dominican Republic's Central authority evinced an "incorrect understanding of various articles of the Convention" and that requests for clarification from their Central Authority did not receive any substantive responses.

==== Ecuador ====

The Hague Abduction Convention entered into force between Ecuador and the United States on March 1, 1992. Over the years Ecuador has been cited in a number of Compliance Reports as a "noncompliant" country or a country demonstrating a "pattern of noncompliance." In the year period covered by the 2010 Report there were 24 children abducted from the U.S. to Ecuador and 7 children abducted from Ecuador to the U.S.

Ecuador has demonstrated noncompliance both in its judicial performance and its Central Authority performance. Convention case hearings are excessively delayed, in violation of the convention's principle of promptly returning children to their habitual country of residence. In addition, courts treat cases as custody decisions, rather than a determination of the appropriate jurisdiction to decide custody. Having delayed proceedings themselves, the courts of Ecuador have been known to determine that, due to the delay, children have resettled in their new environment.

Efforts of the United States to communicate about cases with the Ecuadorian Central Authority (ECA) for the Abduction Convention have not been effective with ECA consistently being unresponsive to the US Central Authority's (USCA) requests for case updates and copies of court rulings. The USCA is not aware of any efforts by the ECA to train judges about the convention.

==== Honduras ====

The Hague Abduction Convention entered into force between Honduras and the United States in 1994. Honduras is the only country to be listed in every singled Compliance Report as non-compliant since the reports began in 1999. The implementation of the Hague Convention in Honduras is broken on every level. It has an executive branch and legislature that is, at various times, unsure if it has actually signed the convention. Its Central Authority sometimes does not exist at all and when it is reestablished does not fulfill any of its roles and is chronically understaffed. The judiciary demonstrates a complete lack of understanding of the treaty and, even in the rare case that a return order is issued, it is not enforced.

In 11 years of reporting on Convention compliance in Honduras there has not been a single case where a return was judicially ordered and enforced. Like with Mexico, would be abductors of children to Honduras can legally take children across the southern land border without the permission of the other parent or even a passport.

==== Mexico ====
Child abduction in Mexico
Hague Abduction Convention
Signature	June 20, 1991
Entry Into Force	September 1, 1991
In effect with the U.S.	October 1, 1991
Compliance Reports
2010	Noncompliant
2009	Patterns of Noncompliance
2008	Patterns of Noncompliance
2007	Patterns of Noncompliance
2006	Not Fully Compliant
2005	Not Fully Compliant
2004	Noncompliant
2003	Noncompliant
2002	Noncompliant
2001	Not Fully Compliant

The Hague Abduction Convention entered into force between Mexico and the United States in 1991. Mexico is the number one destination for international child abductions from the United States and the United States is the number one destination for children abducted from Mexico. The U.S. State Department reports that 65% of all outgoing international parental abductions from the United States to Hague Convention countries are to Mexico, and that 41% of all incoming international parental abductions to the United States are from Mexico. Mexico is the only country that has been found to be "Noncompliant, "Not Fully Compliant" or having a "Pattern of Noncompliance" in every single Compliance Report compiled by the US Department of State since they began in 2001.

One of the primary roadblocks to Mexico's successful implementation of the Hague Abduction Convention is its inability to locate children. This issue has been cited numerous times in the US State Department's annual Compliance Reports. In some cases, the US State Department has reported providing Mexican authorities with detailed information on the whereabouts of abducted children including the exact address where they are living but Mexican authorities still report an inability to locate the children. In late 2009 the Mexican Central Authority gave a presentation at an international symposium on international child abduction where they cited improvements in this area as a result of turning over the responsibility of locating children to the Mexican Federal Police (AFI), rather than exclusively using Interpol who has no authority and must request the involvement of Mexican law enforcement to take any real measures in Mexico.

Of particular relevance to Hague Convention litigation in Mexico is the Mexican Amparo, which translates to "protection" or "help." It is a Mexican legal procedure to protect constitutional rights that was incorporated into the 1847 national constitution. Mexico's "recurso de amparo" is found in Articles 103 and 107 of the Mexican Constitution Any Mexican citizen can file an amparo claiming that a Mexican authority is violating their constitutional rights. Federal District courts are available in every state in Mexico and always have secretaries available to receive an Amparo. In cases of international child abduction an amparo can be filed at any point and effectively blocks progression of legal procedures until it has been heard, often many months, or even years later. The decision in an Amparo trial can also be further appealed and multiple amparos may be filed during legal proceedings under the Hague Convention.

Corruption is an intrinsic part of the problem with international child abduction in Mexico and affects every other aspect of the issue from locating children and judicial decisions to enforcing court orders for repatriation in the rare cases where the obstacles of locating children and judicial noncompliance have been overcome.

There is an Extradition Treaty between the United States of America and the United Mexican States (see 31 U.S.T. 5061) that, like many such treaties, provides for the extradition of a party who has been charged with or found guilty of an offense committed in one country. An offense is extraditable if it is a crime in both countries and punishable by incarceration for a period of one year or more. In theory this allows for the extradition of child abductors who have absconded to Mexico as child abduction is a federal crime there. In practice, US authorities rarely request extradition in preference of Hague Convention litigation, despite Mexico's gross noncompliance with the Convention and, even when they do, Mexico is not bound to deliver up its nationals and will frequently refuse to do so across the board, particularly in child abduction cases.

Additionally U.S.–Mexico border has the highest number of both legal and illegal crossings of any land border in the world. Although the border is guarded on the United States' side by more than seventeen thousand border patrol agents, they only have "effective control" of less than 700 miles of the 1,954 mile border. In terms of international child abduction from the US into Mexico specifically, the problem of poor border security in general is compounded by the fact the United States does not have exit controls; American children may be taken across the southern border of the United States without having the necessary documentation to get back into the country and there is no accounting for children taken across the border into Mexico, leading to thousands of missing children posters with the words "may have traveled to Mexico" on them.

==== Panama ====

Panama's performance in implementing the convention was previously cited as "non-compliant". However, progress has been noted in Panama's handling of its Convention responsibilities during the 2005 reporting period and the United States presently considers Panama to be "not fully compliant" in its implementation of the convention.

==== Venezuela ====
The Hague Abduction Convention entered into force between Venezuela and the United States at the start of 1997. According to the compliance Reports, Venezuela was cited as a country "non-compliant" with the Hague Convention in 2006 and as demonstrating "patterns of noncompliance" in 2008 and 2009. The Venezuelan Central Authority typically failed to be responsive to inquiries regarding abduction cases by the United States Department of State, the US Embassy in Caracas, or victimized parents. Venezuelan judges often misinterpret return and access applications under the convention as a request for them to determine custody or visitation rights and have been observed to have a nationalistic bias in favor of the Venezuelan parent.

In addition, despite return orders issued by lower courts, the abducting parents can and do take advantage of prolonged appeals processes to significantly delay the return of children. These delays are particularly pronounced in cases in which the left-behind parent can not afford to retain a private attorney. Without the use of a private attorney, cases take very long.

== United States Government handling of abduction cases ==
The United States government generally, and the U.S. Department of State specifically, have been subject to sustained criticism for not doing enough to prevent the abduction of American children or support American parents of internationally abducted children in their recovery efforts. They have also been criticized for, conversely, catering to foreign countries and parents with abducted children taken to the United States, and not doing enough to facilitate the recovery efforts of foreign parents.

=== United States Department of State ===
American parents complain that they are essentially alone in dealing with foreign courts and legal systems. The US State Department has a virtual monopoly on information in such cases, but refuses to act as a vigorous advocate for left-behind American parents while also preventing the National Center for Missing and Exploited Children or anyone else from playing that role. State Department attorney Thomas Johnson remarked that when he reminded one senior State Department official with Child Abduction Convention responsibilities that she works for the American people, her immediate response was: "I don't work for the American people; I work for the Secretary of State", demonstrating the department's inherent conflict of interest (i.e., a desire to maintain "good" bilateral foreign relations for their own sake that overrides assertive and effective advocacy on behalf of American citizens).

==== Dangerous Diplomacy ====
The journalist Joel Mowbray wrote the book "Dangerous Diplomacy" on the role and culture of the US State Department. Mowbray's second chapter in "Dangerous Diplomacy", titled "Cold Shoulder: State's Smallest Victim's", is dedicated to an analysis of the assistance provided to American parents left in the wake of an international child abduction. It describes State's overriding desire to appease foreign governments and maintain "good relations" as having a conflict of interest between their responsibility to internationally abducted children as the designated United States Central Authority under the Hague Convention. This inherent conflict of interest between the two roles is magnified by what the book defines as the "culture of State", a culture characterized by extreme moral relativism, valuing process over substance and misplaced priorities that reward failures by promotions or high paying jobs "consulting" for the foreign government of the country that they'd previously been paid to advocate America's interests in.

=== United States Congress ===
==== Extracts from Congressional testimony ====
Bernard W. Aronson, Assistant Secretary of State for Inter-American Affairs (1989–1993)

"..the current system to secure the return of these abducted American children does not work and will not work unless it is changed profoundly. I don't doubt the sincerity or the dedication of the professionals in the State Department who have lead responsibility for this problem, but they do not have the tools and powers to do their job effectively. And unless Congress gives them the power and the tools we will be back here in five years or 10 years with another set of hearings, another group of parents with broken hearts and devastated dreams, and we will be making the same statements we are making today."

"the principal reason other nations, whether they are signatories to the Hague Convention or not, refuse to cooperate with the United States in returning abducted American children is that there are no real consequences for failing to do so."

"Let me be blunt, a diplomatic request for which there are no consequences for refusal is just a sophisticated version of begging. And there are no consequences today for Brazil or any other nation which refuses to return American children."

== See also ==
- Office of Children's Issues
- Hague Abduction Convention
- Hague Convention 1996
- Human rights
- Kidnapping
- National Center for Missing and Exploited Children
- Child laundering
- Trafficking of children
- Take Root
- Hague Abduction Convention Compliance Reports
- Not Without My Daughter
