= UK-Pakistan Judicial Protocol on Children Matters =

International protocol

The UK-Pakistan Judicial Protocol on Children Matters is a protocol between senior family court judges of the Family Division of the High Court in England and Wales and The Supreme Court of Pakistan. The protocol relates to the wrongful removal of children, the welfare of abducted children, information flow between courts and resolution of family disputes between the two jurisdictions.

The protocol predates Pakistan's 2016 ratification of the Hague Convention on the Civil Aspects of International Child Abduction (1980). The UK has not accepted the accession of Pakistan to the Hague Convention, so the 1980 Hague Convention cannot be used between the UK and Pakistan. The protocol has been used as recently as December 2022, where a UK based Pakistani asked the Lahore High Court to implement the protocol. The protocol had previously been used in the 2006 Lahore High Court by lawyers acting for the mother of Misbah Rana, a 12-year-old girl who was taken to Pakistan by her father.

The protocol was signed on 17 January 2003 by Dame Elizabeth Butler-Sloss, then President of the Family Division of the High Court of England and Wales and Hon. Mr. Justice Sh. Riaz Ahmad, then Chief Justice of the Supreme Court of Pakistan. A supplement to the protocol was signed on 23 September 2003, in addition to the original signatories by Lady Anne Smith, of the Supreme Courts of Scotland and Mr. Justice Gillen of the High Court of Northern Ireland. The UK side of the protocol is invoked via the UK judiciary's International Family Justice Office, the same body that administers Hague Convention actions.

Reunite, the leading UK charity on child abduction has noted that the protocol is not treated as law in either jurisdiction, so judges may revert to domestic family law instead of the protocol. However, whilst not legally binding, the protocol is referred to in judges' orders in both jursidictions as it is in line with the normal practices of the UK and Pakistani courts.
