= Patricia Roush =

American activist

Patricia Roush is an American activist who has pioneered the issue of international child abduction and has been at the forefront of this issue as it relates to Saudi Arabia.

== Background ==
Roush's own daughters, Alia and Aisha, were kidnapped by their non-custodial Saudi father and were never returned to the United States. Now grown, they remain in Saudi Arabia due to its ban on women traveling without a male guardian's permission. Reportedly, they are now both married as a result of arranged marriages and have children of their own.

She has testified to the United States Congress to advocate more be done to repatriate kidnapped children. American children who are victim to international child abduction are most often the result of failed marriages of an American to either a Mexican citizen or a Canadian subject, with the child being forcibly taken to those respective countries.

She has sought help from the U.S. government, and believes it has largely let her down; however, she cites former Saudi Ambassador Ray Mabus and U.S. Rep. Dan Burton (R-CA) as individuals who were particularly supportive. She wrote At Any Price, detailing her experiences with the Saudi government.

== See also ==
- Hague Convention on the Civil Aspects of International Child Abduction
- International child abduction in the United States
- Not Without My Daughter
