= Golan v. Saada =

- Supreme Court of the United States

Argued March 22, 2022 Decided June 15, 2022
- Full case name: Narkis Aliza Golan v. Isacco Jacky Saada
- Docket no.: 20-1034
- Citations: 596 U.S. 666 (more)
- Argument: Oral argument

Holding
- A court is not categorically required to examine all possible ameliorative measures before denying a Hague Convention petition for return of a child to a foreign country once the court has found that return would expose the child to a grave risk of harm.

Court membership
- Chief Justice John Roberts Associate Justices Clarence Thomas · Stephen Breyer; Samuel Alito · Sonia Sotomayor; Elena Kagan · Neil Gorsuch; Brett Kavanaugh · Amy Coney Barrett

Case opinion
- Majority: Sotomayor, joined by unanimous

Laws applied
- Hague Convention on the Civil Aspects of International Child Abduction

Golan v. Saada, 596 U.S. 666 (2022), was a United States Supreme Court case concerning the Hague Convention on the Civil Aspects of International Child Abduction. The case reviewed whether all ameliorative measures must be taken into consideration before denying a Hague Convention petition once it is found that the child could face harm when returned to a foreign country.

== Background ==
Isacco Saada and Narkis Golan were a couple who had married in Milan, Italy. During their marriage, Saada was abusive towards Golan and they often argued. Sometimes, during arguments, Saada would "push, slap, and grab Golan and pull her hair." Saada had made threats against Golan's life on an occasion. Many of these acts of abuse happened in front of their son, B.A.S.

In July 2018, Golan flew with her son B.A.S. to the United States to attend her brother's wedding, but instead of returning to Italy afterward, she found refuge in a domestic violence shelter. After he found out, Saada filed a criminal complaint in Italy and filed a petition under the Hague Convention and the International Child Abduction Remedies Act (ICARA) in the United States District Court for the Eastern District of New York.

Initially, the district court allowed B.A.S to return to Italy by seeking ameliorative measures, which included Saada providing Golan $20,000, dismissing his criminal complaint in Italy and seeking therapy, which was consistent with the United States Court of Appeals for the Second Circuit's precedent at the time. On appeal, however, the Second Circuit found the measures were insufficient in mitigating the risk and vacated the judgment.

On remand, the district court worked with the Italian Authorities to ensure that a protective order was filed against Saada to prevent Saada from approaching Golan and that social services in Italy oversaw Saada's therapy and parenting classes. The Second Circuit now affirmed.

Golan filed a petition for a writ of certiorari.

== Supreme Court ==
The court granted certiorari on December 10, 2021, and heard oral arguments on March 22, 2022. On June 15, 2022, the Supreme Court vacated the Second Circuit's judgment in a unanimous opinion written by Justice Sonia Sotomayor.
