= David Goldman =

David Goldman may refer to:

- David Goldman (businessman) (1937–1999), founder of The Sage Group
- David E. Goldman (1910–1998), scientist
- David P. Goldman (born 1951), writer and economist, and columnist under the pen name Spengler
- David Goldman, a party in the Goldman child abduction case
