= Nottinghamshire County Council v B =

2011 Irish Supreme Court case

Nottinghamshire County Council v B & anor
- Coat of arms of Ireland
- Court: Supreme Court of Ireland
- Full case name: In the matter of s. 9 of the Child Abduction and Enforcement of Custody Orders Act 1991 and in the matter of Nottinghamshire County Council (Respondent) v KB and KB (Appellants) and The Health Service Executive and The Attorney General (Notice Parties)
- Decided: 15 December 2011
- Citations: [2011] IESC 48; [2013] 4 IR 662

Case history
- Appealed from: Nottinghamshire County Council v B & Anor [2010] IEHC 9

Court membership
- Judges sitting: Denham CJ, Murray J, Fennelly J, Macken J, O'Donnell J

Case opinions
- The court noted that if a practice was not provided for by Irish legislation, it did not automatically follow that it violated the Constitution.
- Decision by: Murray J, O'Donnell J
- Concurrence: Denham CJ, Fennelly J, Macken J

Keywords
- Family law; Abduction; Hague Convention; Irish Constitution

Nottinghamshire County Council v B [2011] IESC 48; [2013] 4 IR 662 was an Irish Supreme Court case in which the Supreme Court refused to overturn an order of the High Court returning children of married parents from England to that jurisdiction, following a request by the English courts under the Hague Convention on the Civil Aspects of International Child Abduction 1980 (the "Hague Convention").

== Background ==
The appellants were the married parents of two children. The family lived in England until 2008, and had no prior connection with Ireland. Nottinghamshire County Council expressed concerns about the care of their children. In November 2008, the appellants moved to Ireland, with the children, who were taken into the care of the Health Service Executive (the "HSE"). Nottinghamshire County Council brought an application pursuant to Article 12 of the Hague Convention and Article 11 of Council Regulation 2201/2003 (the "Regulation") for the return of the children to the jurisdiction of the Courts of England and Wales. The parents contended that the return of the children would be in breach of the Irish Constitution, in that the law of the United Kingdom permitted adoption of the children of married couples in circumstances that would not be permitted in Ireland by virtue, they argued, of the constitutional rights afforded to families under Articles 41 and 42 of the Irish Constitution. The High Court rejected this argument. The trial judge found that adoption of the children in this case was no more than a “possibility”, rather than the object of the application itself. In the circumstances, the trial judge considered that it could not be said to be contrary to any fundamental principle of Irish constitutional law to order the return of the children. The parents appealed to the Supreme Court.

== Holding of the Supreme Court ==
O’ Donnell J gave the leading judgment in the Supreme Court. He noted that the arguments on both sides urged the Court to make "large generalisations, albeit that their proposed generalisations are almost diametrically opposed". The judge warned against such an approach, noting that, in his view, the conclusions the Court should draw in this case should be nuanced.

=== The appellants’ arguments considered ===
O’ Donnell J rejected two “far reaching” propositions of the appellants. First, he rejected the argument that no child could be returned to a jurisdiction that did not recognise the “inalienable and imprescriptible” rights of the family under Articles 41 and 42 of the Irish Constitution. Secondly, he addressed the argument that the adoption would not be permitted under Irish law on the basis of the facts of this case. It was not enough, he held, to simply establish that the law of another jurisdiction (here the law of England and Wales) was different to the law in Ireland. He held that it was necessary to go further and show “that the manner in which these children would be dealt with by the courts of the requesting jurisdiction must necessarily offend against the provisions of the Irish Constitution if administered in an Irish court”.

=== The respondents’ arguments considered ===
O’ Donnell J also rejected the key arguments of the respondents. In particular, he rejected the argument that the Constitution could not be invoked (in the context of Article 20 of the Hague Convention) by persons who had only just arrived in Ireland (and arguably had brought a child to Ireland wrongfully within the meaning of the Hague Convention). Article 20 of the Hague Convention provides that “[t]he return of the child under the provisions of Article 12 may be refused if this would not be permitted by the fundamental principles of the requested State relating to the protection of human rights and fundamental freedoms.”

=== The test to be applied ===
In deciding whether or not a child should be returned to the requesting State (in this case, the United Kingdom), O’ Donnell J stated that the test to be applied is “whether what is proposed or contemplated in the requesting State is something which departs so markedly from the essential scheme and order envisaged by the Constitution and is such a direct consequence of the Court’s order that return is not permitted by the Constitution”. O’ Donnell J held that this was not the situation in this case, as the return would not be manifestly incompatible with the Constitution.

Murray J also gave a judgment in this case. He agreed that Article 20 of the Hague Convention could not be interpreted as meaning that the return of a wrongfully abducted child to his/her country of habitual residence must be refused by reason only of the fact that the law or judicial process in that country is not the same as that which the law of Ireland would require. However, the judge concluded that the fact that the proceedings in England did include an application for placement with a view to adoption, dispensing with the consent of the parents, meant that appellants could seek to “assert constitutionally protected rights of their family" under the aegis of Article 20. Ultimately, however, he concluded, that the assertion in this case was not well founded.

=== Conclusion ===
The Supreme Court dismissed the appeal, and upheld the ruling of the High Court that there were no grounds, under the law and the Constitution, for concluding that it would be impermissible to return the abducted children in to the United Kingdom.
