= Reunite =

Reunite may refer to:

- Reunite International Child Abduction Centre, a UK charity focusing on international child abduction
- Reunite (album), a 2010 album by The O.C. Supertones
