= National Child Search Assistance Act =

The National Child Search Assistance Act of 1990 (NCSA) (42 U.S.C. 5779 (Reporting Requirement) and 42 U.S.C. 5780 (State Requirements): The NCSA requires local, state and federal law enforcement agencies to immediately enter information about abducted children into the National Crime Information Center (NCIC) database without requiring a waiting period.

The Adam Walsh Child Protection and Safety Act of 2006 amended the NCSA to require law enforcement to enter information about missing and abducted children in the NCIC database within two hours of receiving a report.

== See also ==
- International Child Abduction Remedies Act
- Hague Abduction Convention
- International Parental Kidnapping Crime Act
