= Misbah Rana =

Pakistani-Scottish child involved in publicised parental custody issues

Misbah Iram (a.k.a. Molly) Ahmed Rana (previously Campbell)
- Born: July 1994 (age 31); Glasgow, Scotland
- Other names: Molly Campbell
- Known for: A child involved in publicised parental custody issues.
- Parent(s): Sajad Ahmed Rana and Louise Fairlie (previously known as Louise Campbell)

Misbah Iram Ahmed Rana (Urdu: مصباح ارم احمد رانا) (born July 1994), also known as Molly Campbell, is a Scottish woman of mixed Scottish-Pakistani heritage who was at the centre of an alleged child abduction case in August 2006.

== Early life ==
Misbah/Molly was born in Glasgow, Scotland to Pakistani father Sajad Ahmed Rana (born 1960), and Scottish mother, Louise (born 1968), and has two elder brothers Omar (born 1986) and Adam (born 1990), an elder sister Tahmina (born 1988). She also has a half-sister Rachel (born 2006), her mother's child with her new partner Kenny Campbell, and two other younger half-sisters who are her father's children with his new wife. Misbah had acquired the surname Campbell from the man with whom her mother lived in Stornoway.

Her parents married in Muslim tradition in 1984, after her mother converted to Islam. Growing up, the children were raised within the Muslim faith until discontent became apparent between Sajad and Louise. They eventually divorced in 2001, when Misbah was seven, and all four Rana children initially stayed with their father, as requested by their mother. He eventually relocated back to his homeland of Pakistan; the children accompanied him for the first few months before returning to their mother in Scotland. In 2005, Tahmina and Adam chose to return to Pakistan to live with their father while Misbah remained in her mother's custody. Her elder brother Omar continues to live in Glasgow, where he is studying. Misbah and her mother then moved from Glasgow to Stranraer, a decision Louise Campbell claims was motivated by threats allegedly made by her former husband. In November 2005 they moved to Stornoway.

== 2006- ==
On 25 August 2006, Molly was met by her sister Tahmina outside the gates of her high school. The sisters then met up with their father, who had been staying in a hotel on the Western Isles, and took a flight from Stornoway to Glasgow before boarding a flight to Lahore, Pakistan. By the time her mother realised what had happened, they were already on their way to Pakistan.

The following day, after Interpol launched a search for the missing twelve-year-old, Louise Campbell made an emotional plea to the media, claiming her former husband had abducted Misbah, against the child's wishes, with the intent to marry her off to a twenty-five-year-old cousin. (Child marriage and forced marriage are issues that activists such as Southall Black Sisters claim are a significant problem among British Asians; marriage between cousins is culturally encouraged in those communities.) This allegation has been denied by Misbah, her father and prominent members of the Pakistani community in Scotland, including Bashir Maan.

=== Abduction or runaway? ===
Within days of sparking international fears for her safety, Misbah was discovered at her father's house, located in a wealthy suburb of Lahore, Pakistan. On 28 August, Scottish MP Mohammed Sarwar, who was friends with Sajad Rana, flew to Pakistan to mediate with the family.

Four days later, a press conference was held, attended by Misbah and her father where the girl vehemently denied the idea she was to be made a child bride and instead claimed she begged her father to take her to Pakistan, where she wanted to live with him and her siblings. Within hours, Louise Campbell's solicitors in Scotland insisted legal action was still underway to bring the child back to Britain and in her mother's custody but, in retaliation, Sajad said he was preparing to go before a Pakistani court to ask for her legal guardianship. And on 2 September, he was awarded temporary custody of Misbah after she signed a statement, saying she arrived in Pakistan from Scotland on 26 August 2006 under her own free will, although he had to surrender her passport to ensure he could not take her out of the High Court's jurisdiction.

Campbell lodged a petition at the Lahore court alleging the child was illegally taken to Pakistan by her ex-husband and eldest daughter and activated the protocol that any custody case should be held in Scotland. This is in light of the 2003 Judicial Protocol signed by British and Pakistani judiciary officials in agreement that any abducted child should be returned to the country usually resided in and the court of that country should decide which parent the child should live with.

=== Court case ===
The first hearings to decide Misbah's future were held on 10 October 2006. Louise Campbell was fighting for Misbah to be returned to Scotland where any future cases could be held if the child still maintained she wanted to reside with her father. However, Sajad Rana was determined not to give his daughter back without a fight. He challenged the Judicial Protocol at the Lahore High Court, on the basis that Louise Campbell is an 'apostate' mother who is not suitable to bring up a Muslim child. Misbah herself had clearly stated that she wants to be a Muslim from her own free will, and has said that her mother tried to force her into converting to Christianity.

A proposed shared custody arrangement, whereby the child would not return to Scotland for at least two years and her mother would only be allowed to see her in Pakistan, was rejected on 17 November 2006 by the Lahore High Court judge, who considered it unreasonable.

On 29 November 2006, the judge at the Lahore High Court ruled that Misbah should be handed over to the British High Commission "within seven days". Misbah's father had also lodged a complaint to the Federal Shariat Court, which can overrule any decisions the High Court makes on the case.

"The High Court judge decided to follow the protocol between Pakistan and the UK on the handling of custody cases. The custody hearing was to be held in Scotland's Court of Session, where Sajad had papers lodged, defending Louise's application for permanent custody". However, at a press conference in the eastern Pakistan city of Lahore, the child openly protested the court decision to return her to Scotland.

In early 2007, Louise Campbell, who at that stage had been pegged to win full custody, dropped her claim for full custody against the backdrop of her daughter's continued insistence that she did not want to live with her mother. The parents eventually reached an out of court settlement that grants Louise visitation rights.

=== Final decision ===
Naheeda Mehboob Elahi, counsel of mother of Misbah Irum extended an offer of deal on behalf of her client and submitted that she wanted to withdraw all the cases.

The court accepted her request and issued directives to seek view point of the concerned party in this respect. Both the parties agreed on 4 points.

Both the parties signed on memorandum of reconciliation which was presented before the court.

Under the deal, mother of Misbah Irum will withdraw all the cases pending in the courts of Pakistan and Scotland. Misbah Irum's mother will be provided police security whenever she comes to Pakistan to meet her daughter and all the traveling expenses will be borne by Sajjad Rana, father of Misbah. Thirdly Misbah Irum will be at liberty to proceed to Scotland when she wills so after one year or ten years. Her father will not restrain her from going to Scotland. Mother of Misbah Irum will also be allowed to meet her sons besides her daughter in Pakistan.

Talking to the journalists on the occasion, Misbah Irum said she is very happy with the court's verdict and she has got relief. Now she will stay with her sisters and brothers in Pakistan.

=== Return to the UK ===
It had been reported in 2009 that Misbah/Molly was wanting to return to the UK and that the mother was accusing the father of preventing her from doing so, and also of not letting her maintain the contact rights with their daughter. On 6 February 2011, it was reported that Rana, now 16, had decided to return and had flown back with her brother. However, instead of flying back to Scotland, she went to stay with her sister in England. Her mother, now separated from Mr Campbell and no longer using his surname, said that the entire family was happy, and requested that the press now no longer report on their affairs.
