= Goldman child abduction case =

2004–09 Brazilian and American legal case

In the Goldman child abduction case David Goldman fought for his son Sean Goldman to be returned to the United States after his abduction by his mother to Brazil in 2004. After years of court battles, Sean was returned to his father five and a half years later in 2009. This case of international child abduction gained significant attention in the media and from U.S. politicians.

== Abduction and legal developments ==
Sean Richard Bianchi Carneiro Ribeiro Goldman was born in the year 2000 in the United States, to an American father and Brazilian mother. In June 2004, at the age of four years, Sean went to Brazil with his mother for a two-week vacation. However, his mother refused to return Sean to the United States.

The father David Goldman vowed to have his son back and lawsuits and counter-lawsuits ensued both in the United States and in Brazil. The child abduction case evolved around application of Hague Convention on the Civil Aspects of International Child Abduction. A 2005 Brazilian court ruling found that Sean was wrongfully taken from the U.S., but that nevertheless Sean would remain in Brazil.

Bruna Bianchi Carneiro Ribeiro filed for, and was granted, a divorce by a Brazilian court. She then married Brazilian lawyer João Paulo Lins e Silva in 2007, and subsequently died while giving birth to their child in 2008. After Bruna's death, the Brazilian husband obtained a custody order for the child from the Brazilian courts by failing to inform them of Bruna's death and requesting a new Brazilian birth certificate be issued that listed himself as the father under the Brazilian concept of socio-affective paternity, on the basis of which, he refused to return the boy to David Goldman, Sean's father.

== Media coverage ==
The case was focus of international media coverage.

- On 30 January 2009, NBC's news program Dateline NBC broadcast a lengthy piece titled "Fighting for Sean" on the case and an interview by program's Meredith Vieira with David Goldman, the child's father.
- Goldman was interviewed on many media outlets including in Today a few times, on Dr Phil show on 1 December 2008, on CNN's Larry King Live on 4 March 2009, on CTV's Canada AM and on Fox News Channel's On the Record
- On 16 July 2009, NBC's Today broadcast a one-hour interview with David Goldman.

== Political involvement and return ==
The January 2009 Dateline piece caught the attention of Congressman Chris Smith (R-New Jersey) who contacted the father and offered help. He wrote an article in The Washington Times on 19 June 2009 titled "Will Brazil Do The Right Thing". There were public comments on the case by US Secretary of State Hillary Clinton on 4 March 2009 on NBC's Today show and by Brazilian President Lula on CNN on 23 March 2009. On 15 July 2009, David Goldman testified in front of a Congress committee about child abductions.

The case was subject of deliberations during meetings of high level Brazilian and American officials. U.S. President Obama raised the issue of the boy's return under the Hague Convention with Brazilian President Luiz Inácio Lula da Silva. US Congress introduced H.R. 2702, legislation to suspend Brazil's Generalized System of Preferences trading benefit. The case was also discussed on the US House of Representatives floor with a statement from Congressman Chris Smith (Republican, New Jersey), a staunch supporter of David Goldman, a New Jersey resident. U.S. Secretary of State Hillary Clinton and a New Jersey senator had protested the long legal battle by delaying a trade measure to extend billions of dollars of duty-free benefits on some Brazilian exports.

A Brazilian federal court ruled in December 2009 that Sean must be returned. However, a Brazilian supreme court judge then issued a ruling delaying the case until February 2010 saying the boy should be able to express himself in court. Based on a decision of Brazil's Supreme Court, Sean was handed over to his father on December 24, 2009. Sean was nine years old at the time of his return. U.S. Secretary of State Hillary Clinton treated the case as a diplomatic issue of Brazil's obligations under the Hague Convention.

== Continuing legal and media developments ==
As of January, 2010, his Brazilian family was hoping to regain custody. Sean's grandmother Silvana Bianchi Carneiro Ribeiro vowed to continue the battle through the Brazilian courts. New Jersey courts denied visitation rights for both grandparents and dismissed their complaint in March 2011. The judge reprimanded the grandparents for their "contemptible actions’’. He cited their repeated attempts to undermine the father-son relationship by playing a major part in the original Brazilian litigation, as well as their relentless legal war in continuing litigation in both US and Brazilian courts even after Sean's return.

Media coverage continued after the return:

- NBC paid for a charter flight for David Goldman and 9-year-old Sean back to the U.S. NBC News correspondent Jeff Rossen, along with other members of his team, was on board the plane. The Society of Professional Journalists condemned NBC News for practicing "checkbook journalism" by chartering the jet. Mr. Goldman stated in his book, A Father's Love, that NBC had already chartered the jet to fly its news crew home in time for Christmas Day, and when the courts granted him custody on December 24, NBC offered the ride so that he wouldn't have to risk taking a public flight.
- On 8 January 2010, Dateline NBC broadcast a special on the case upon the successful return of the child to his father. The 2-hour special presented by Meredith Vieira was titled "Bringing Sean Home: The Untold Story". Parts of the exclusive interview and shots of the father-son reunion were broadcast on NBC's Today on 28 December 2009. Parts of this special were aired in Brazil by Rede Record newsmagazine series Domingo Espetacular presented by Paulo Henrique Amorim, on 17 January 2010.
- The season 20 episode of Law & Order titled "Brazil" was inspired by the custody case.
- On April 27, 2012, Dateline aired an interview with Sean Goldman that was conducted by Meredith Vieira.

== Reforms ==
As a result of this case and the media attention, Representative Chris Smith of New Jersey proposed a new law in 2013. The "Sean and David Goldman International Child Abduction Prevention and Return Act of 2014" was passed into law after being approved by US Congress and signed by President Barack Obama. The law requires the US State Department to submit an annual report to Congress on countries' compliance with their obligations under the Hague Child Abduction Convention.

== See also ==
- International child abduction in Brazil
- International child abduction in the United States
