= Chris Smith (New Jersey politician) =

American politician (born 1953)

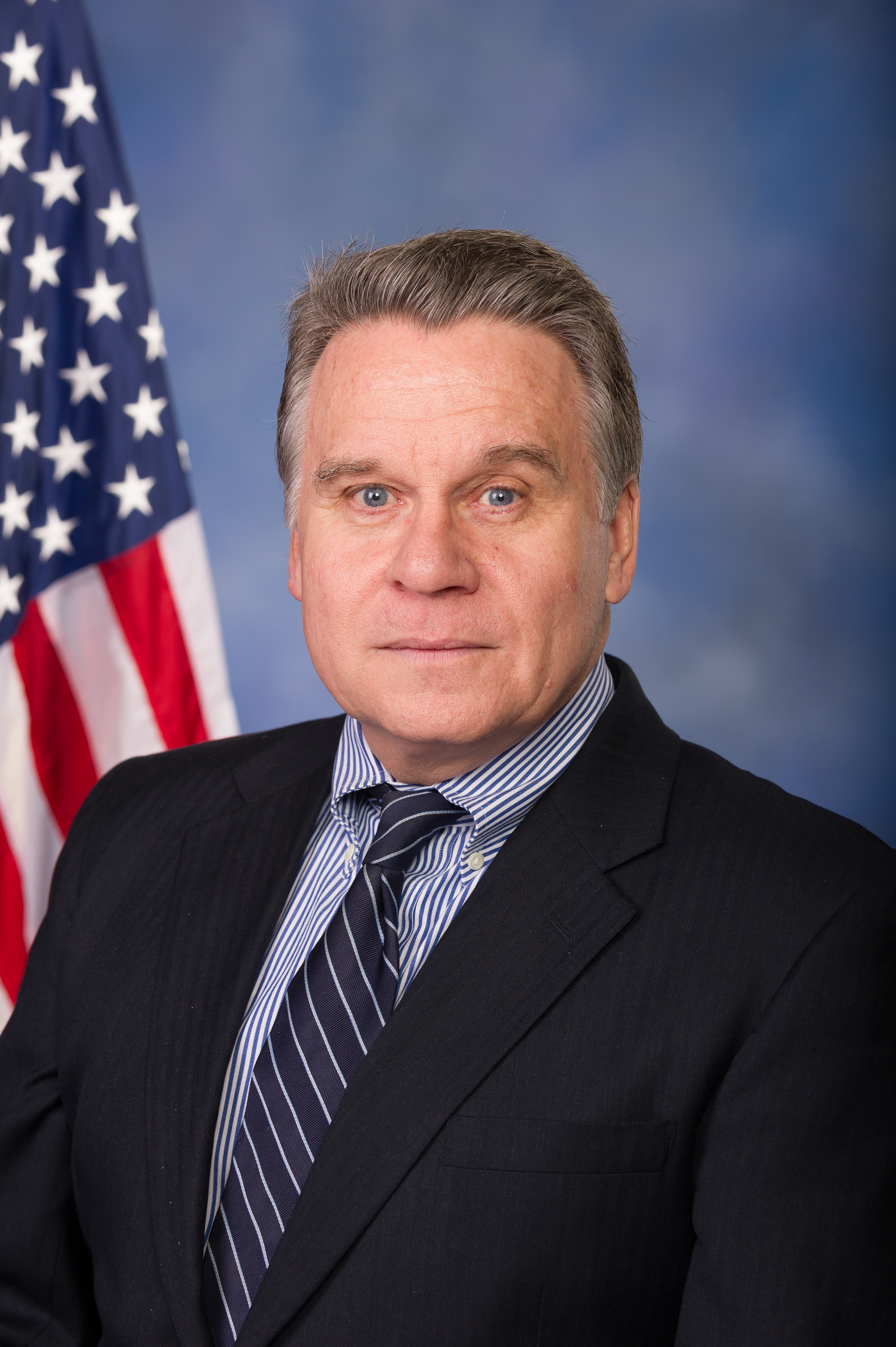
- Official portrait, 2014

Chair of the House Veterans' Affairs Committee
- In office January 4, 2001 – January 3, 2005
- Preceded by: Bob Stump
- Succeeded by: Steve Buyer

Member of the U.S. House of Representatives from New Jersey's 4th district
- Incumbent
- Assumed office January 3, 1981
- Preceded by: Frank Thompson

Personal details
- Born: Christopher Henry Smith; March 4, 1953 (age 73) Rahway, New Jersey, U.S.
- Party: Republican (1978–present)
- Other political affiliations: Democratic (before 1978)
- Spouse: Marie Hahn (m. 1977)
- Children: 4
- Education: Trenton State College (BS)
- Website: House website Campaign website
- Smith's voice Smith supporting the Veterans Entrepreneurship and Benefits Improvement Act of 2003. Recorded June 23, 2003

Christopher Henry Smith (born March 4, 1953) is an American politician serving as the U.S. representative for New Jersey's 4th congressional district since 1981. Though it has taken various forms, his district has always been situated in central New Jersey. Currently, the district contains parts of Ocean and Monmouth counties. Smith is a member of the Republican Party, having switched from the Democratic Party in 1978.

Smith is the dean of New Jersey's congressional delegation. As of 2026, Smith is tied with Hal Rogers for being the longest currently serving member of the House of Representatives. Starting in 2027, Smith will be the only Republican in New Jersey's congressional delegation.

== Early life, education, and early career ==
Smith was born in Rahway, New Jersey, on March 4, 1953. He attended St. Mary's High School in Perth Amboy, where he competed as a runner and wrestler. He graduated from there in 1971.

He attended Worcester College (since renamed University of Worcester) in 1974. After graduating with a B.A. in business administration from Trenton State College (now The College of New Jersey) in 1975, Smith worked in his family's sporting goods business. In the 1976 election cycle, he managed the Democratic primary challenge of Steven Foley, an attorney and anti-abortion activist, against incumbent Senator Harrison A. Williams; Foley received about 15% of the vote, losing to Williams. He also ran to represent New Jersey's 19th legislative district as a delegate to the 1976 Democratic National Convention. Smith supported Ellen McCormack, the chair of the New York State Right to Life Party, for president of the United States and ran as a delegate pledged to support her candidacy.

In 1978, Smith switched to the Republican Party, and became executive director of the New Jersey Right to Life Committee, a part-time role.

== U.S. House of Representatives ==
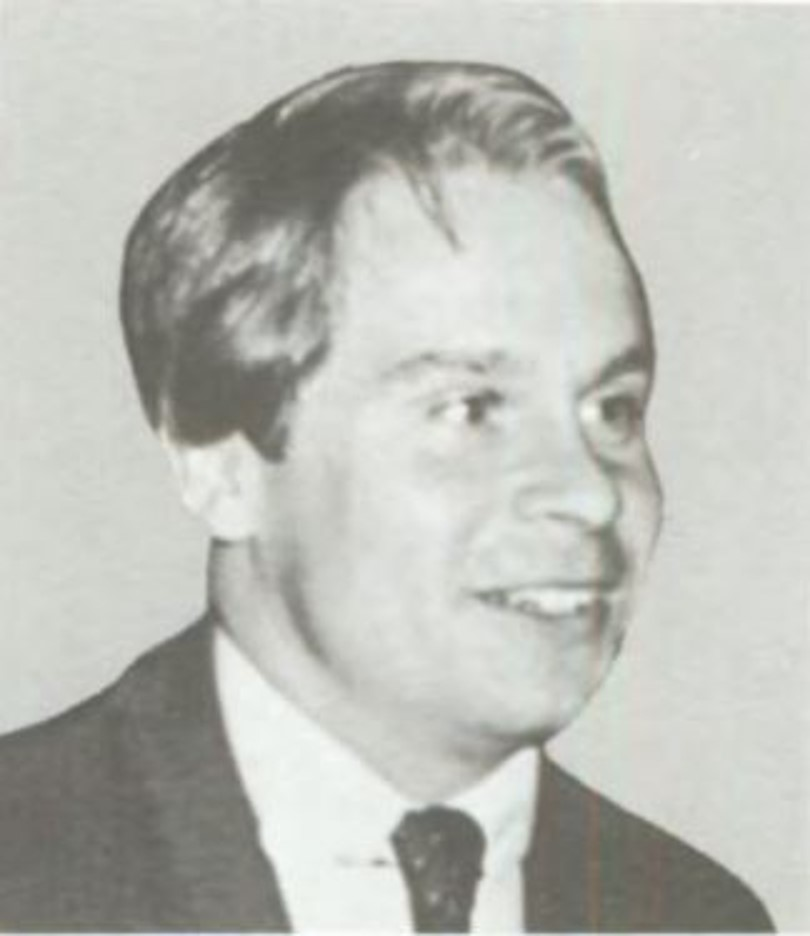
Smith in 1981

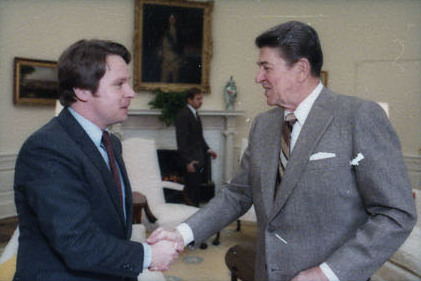
Smith with President Ronald Reagan in 1985

=== Elections ===
==== 1978 ====
In 1978, while working at his family's sporting goods store, 25-year-old Smith ran for Congress as a Republican. He lost to long-time Democratic incumbent U.S. Congressman Frank Thompson 61%–37%.

==== 1980 ====
In 1980, Smith ran against Thompson again. Initially, Smith was thought to have a very slim chance of winning, but Thompson was indicted as part of the FBI's Abscam probe. With the race now considered competitive, Republicans considered replacing Smith, but two alternative candidates seen as more competitive, Hamilton mayor John K. Rafferty and 1978 Senate nominee Jeff Bell, declined. Helped by Ronald Reagan's strong performance in the district, Smith defeated Thompson 57%–41%.

==== 1982 ====
In 1982, Smith's district was redrawn to include more Democratic voters, and his Democratic opponent was former New Jersey Senate President Joseph P. Merlino, who had directly controlled the redistricting process and run a competitive campaign for governor the year before. It was widely assumed that Smith's 1980 victory over the scandal-plagued Thompson was a fluke, and that he would lose to the better-known Merlino. At the end of one of their debates, Smith approached Merlino to exchange pleasantries. Merlino was quoted as saying "Beat it, kid."

During the campaign, Merlino ran a negative ad comparing Smith to Jimmy Stewart's character in Mr. Smith Goes to Washington. In response, Stewart released a statement endorsing Smith and denouncing the ad: "When I played Mr. Smith in that picture, I did not think he was a naive hick. I thought he believed in honesty and integrity in government, the right of the people and the love of his country." Merlino pulled the ad.

Smith won the race with 52.7% of the vote.

Subsequently, a federal court found the 1982 redistricting was impermissible gerrymandering, and Smith's district was redrawn to more closely resemble the one used in 1980. He has never faced another competitive election since.

==== 1984 ====
Smith ran for a third term and defeated Democratic candidate James C. Hedden in the general election.

==== 1986 ====
Smith ran for a fourth term and defeated Democratic candidate Jeffrey Laurenti in the general election.

==== 1988 ====
Smith ran for a fifth term and defeated Democratic candidate Betty Holland in the general election.

==== 1990 ====
Smith ran for a sixth term and defeated Democratic candidate Mark Setaro in the general election.

==== 1992 ====
Smith ran for a seventh term and defeated Democratic candidate Brian M. Hughes in the general election.

==== 1994 ====
Smith ran for an eighth term and defeated Democratic candidate Ralph Walsh in the general election.

==== 1996 ====
Smith ran for a ninth term and defeated Democratic candidate Kevin Meara in the general election.

==== 1998 ====
Smith ran for a tenth term and defeated Democratic candidate Larry Schneider in the general election.

==== 2000 ====
Smith ran for an eleventh term and defeated Democratic candidate Reed Gusciora in the general election.

==== 2002 ====
Smith ran for a twelfth term and defeated Democratic candidate Mary Brennan in the general election.

==== 2004 ====
Smith ran for a thirteenth term and defeated Democratic candidate Amy Vasquez in the general election.

==== 2006 ====
Smith ran for a fourteenth term and defeated Democratic candidate Carol Gay in the general election, winning 66% of the vote. Smith's win was the highest percentage for any Republican in the New Jersey delegation.

==== 2008 ====
Smith ran for a fifteenth term and defeated Democratic candidate Josh Zeitz in the general election, winning 66% of the vote.

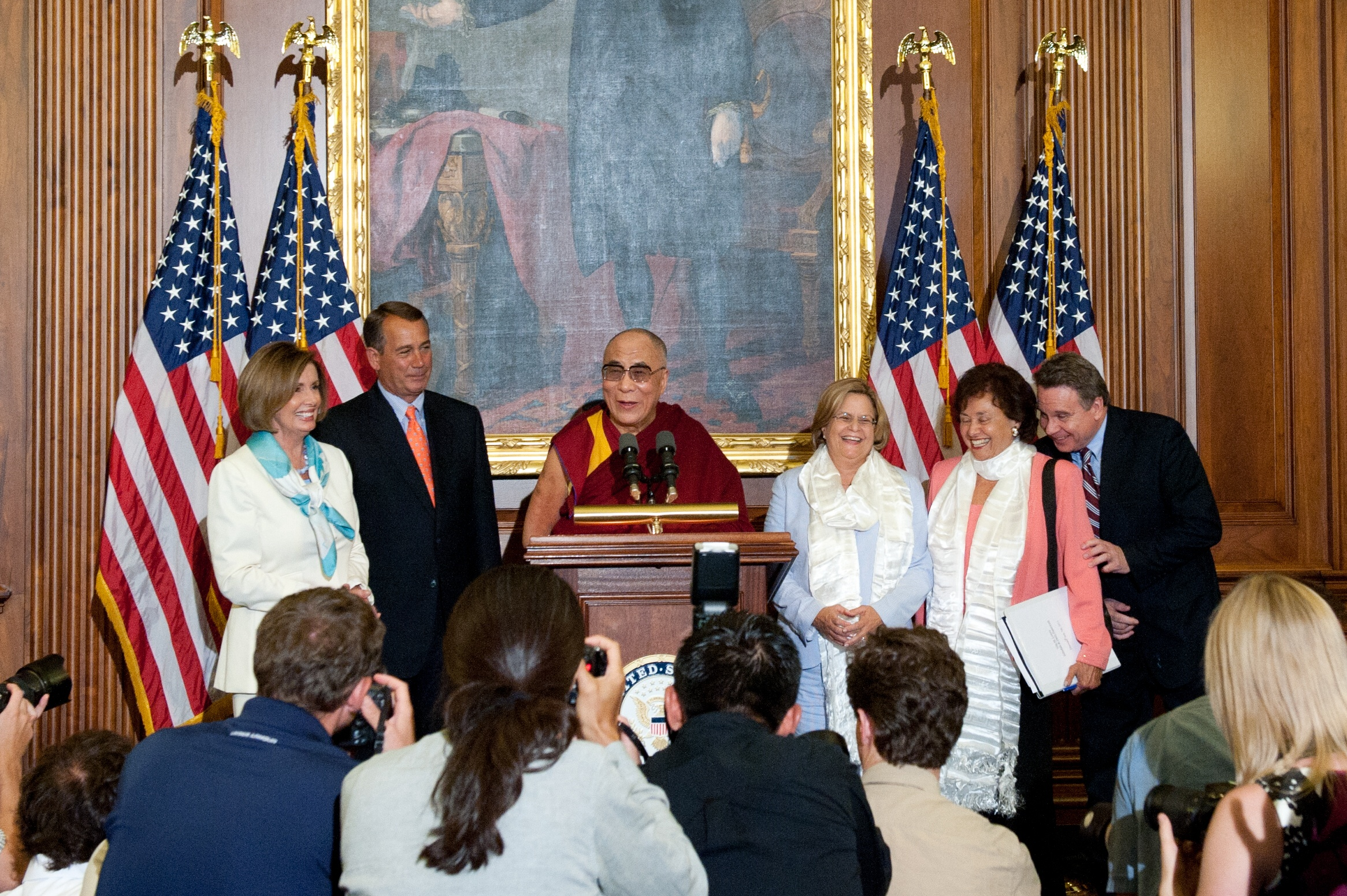
Former Speaker John Boehner, U.S. House Speaker Nancy Pelosi, Chair of the House Foreign Affairs Committee Ileana Ros-Lehtinen, Congressmembers Nita Lowey and Chris Smith meet the Tibetan leader 14th Dalai Lama in 2011

==== 2010 ====
Smith ran for a sixteenth term and defeated Democratic candidate Howard Kleinhendler in the general election.

==== 2012 ====
Redistricting made the 4th safer for Smith. All but two townships in Mercer County, including the 4th's remaining share of Trenton, were drawn into the 12th district. The 12th had absorbed almost half of the capital in the 2000s redistricting; Trenton had anchored the district and its predecessors for over a century.

Smith ran for a seventeenth term and defeated Democratic candidate Brian Froelich in the general election.

==== 2014 ====
Smith ran for an eighteenth term and defeated Democrat Ruben Scolavino in the general election.

==== 2016 ====
Smith ran for a nineteenth term and defeated Democrat Lorna Phillipson in the general election, winning 63.7% of the vote.

==== 2018 ====
Smith ran for a twentieth term and defeated Democratic nominee Joshua Welle, winning 55% of the vote. Smith was the only Republican to win a congressional race in New Jersey that year, reducing the GOP to its smallest presence in New Jersey's House delegation since 1918. This was Smith's closest election since 1982.

==== 2020 ====
Smith ran for a twenty-first term and defeated Democratic nominee Stephanie Schmid in the general election, winning 59.9% of the vote.

==== 2022 ====
Redistricting carved away the 4th's remaining share of Mercer County, including Smith's home in Hamilton Township. In the process, it lost its last connection to Thompson. The 4th was now an exclusively Jersey Shore-based district.

Smith moved to Manchester Township and sough a twenty-second term in the new 4th. He defeated Democratic nominee Matthew Jenkins with 66.9% of the vote.

==== 2024 ====
Smith ran for a twenty-third term and defeated Democrat Matthew Jenkins in the general election, winning 67.3% of the vote.

=== Tenure ===
Smith was ranked the 17th most bipartisan member of the House of Representatives during the 114th United States Congress (and the second most bipartisan from New Jersey) in the Bipartisan Index by the Lugar Center.

In November 1997, Smith was one of 18 House Republicans to co-sponsor a resolution by Bob Barr that sought to launch an impeachment inquiry against President Bill Clinton. The resolution did not specify any charges or allegations. This was an early effort to impeach Clinton, predating the Clinton–Lewinsky scandal. That scandal led to a more serious effort to impeach Clinton in 1998. On October 8, 1998, Smith voted in favor of legislation that was passed to open an impeachment inquiry. On December 19, 1998, he voted in favor of all four proposed articles of impeachment against Clinton (only two of which received the needed majority of votes to be adopted).

It was revealed in October 2015 that intern applicants for Smith's office were required to rate "27 different personalities, organizations, and political issues, to indicate whether they tend to agree with them, disagree with them, or have no opinion or knowledge of them". Personalities and organizations included Rachel Maddow, the Pope, Planned Parenthood, and The National Right to Life Committee.

Smith has been nominated, and confirmed, twice to serve as a member of the United States delegation to the United Nations General Assembly. He was nominated by President Barack Obama in 2015 for the 70th session and by President Donald Trump in 2017 for the 72nd session.

Smith voted against both articles in the first impeachment of Donald Trump, and the sole article of the second impeachment of Donald Trump.

Smith did not join the majority of Republican members of Congress who signed an amicus brief in support of Texas v. Pennsylvania, a lawsuit filed at the United States Supreme Court contesting the results of the 2020 presidential election. Smith voted to certify both Arizona's and Pennsylvania's results in the 2021 United States Electoral College vote count.

On February 4, 2021, Smith voted with 10 other House Republicans and all House Democrats to strip Marjorie Taylor Greene of her House Education and Labor Committee and House Budget Committee assignments, in response to controversial political statements she had made. On November 5, 2021, Smith was one of 13 House Republicans to break with their party and vote with a majority of Democrats in favor of the Infrastructure Investment and Jobs Act.

As of 2008, Smith resides in Herndon, Virginia, and rented an apartment in Hamilton, New Jersey.

In April 2026, Smith presided over a pro forma session called by House Democrats to halt Trump's war against Iran and gaveled out the session before the resolution by Glenn Ivey could be brought up, resulting in Democratic lawmakers present to yell in protest.

Veterans

In January 2001, Smith became chairman of the Veterans' Affairs Committee, and pushed for policies Republican leadership opposed, including voting against the Republican, and for the Democratic, budget resolution, because the latter included more spending on veterans programs. In 2004, Smith refused to endorse the Republican budget proposal, unless it included more money for veterans. In a congressional hearing, Smith articulated his belief that the Bush Administration's budget request was $1.2 billion less than the Department of Veterans Affairs actually required, embarrassing the administration and Republican congressional leadership. During his four years as committee chair, Smith wrote 22 bills addressing veterans' issues. His unwillingness to follow the party line resulted in the House Republican Caucus removing him from his chairmanship (and from the committee altogether) in January 2005, at the beginning of the 109th Congress, with the chairmanship going to Steve Buyer instead, two years short of the normal six-year term. Veterans' groups such as the Veterans of Foreign Wars and Paralyzed Veterans of America praised Smith and criticized the decision to remove him.

==== Legislation ====
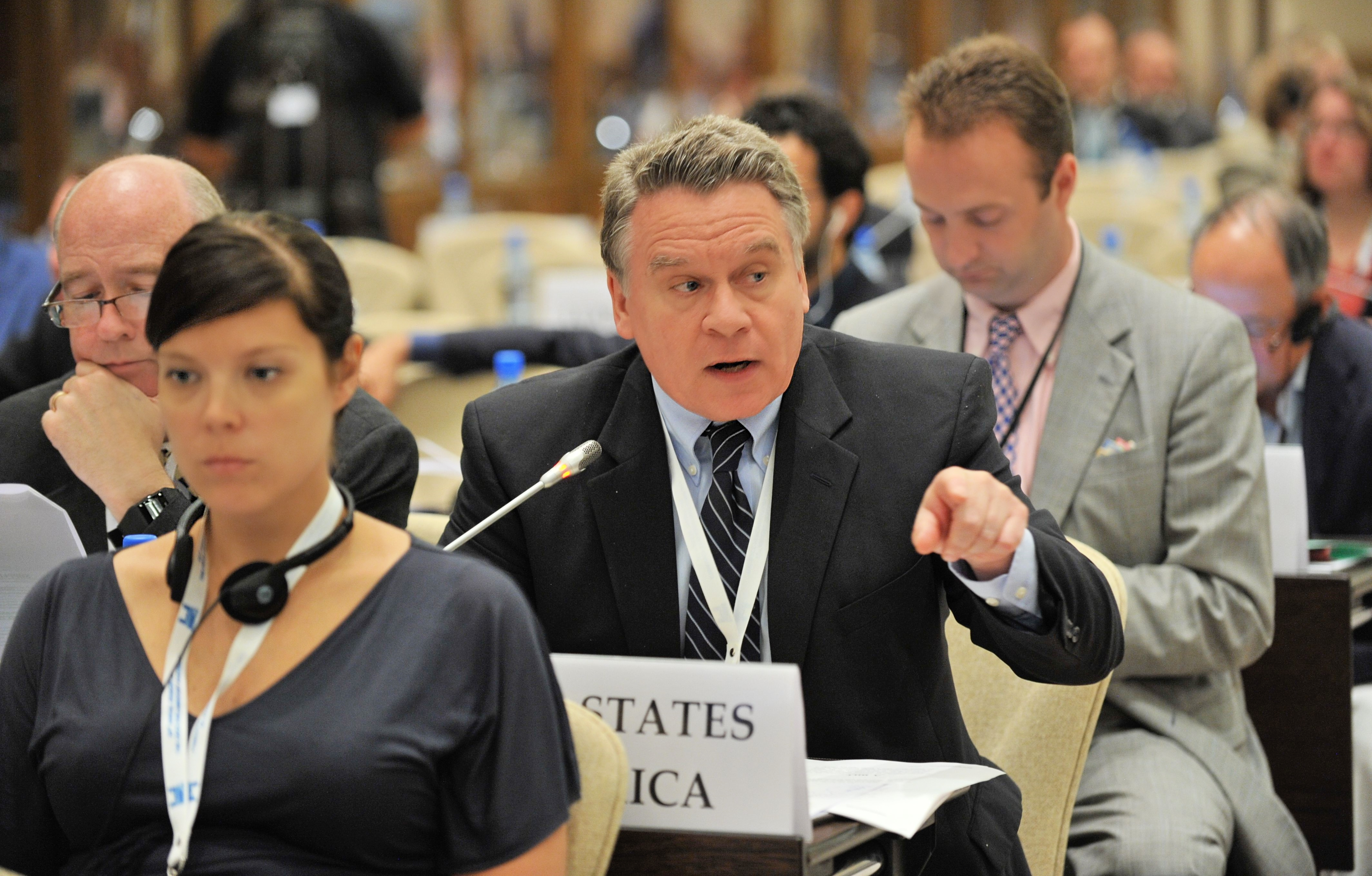
U.S. Congressman Chris Smith presented a resolution at the OSCE Parliamentary Assembly as Special Representative on Human Trafficking Issues.

On May 6, 2014, Smith introduced the bill International Megan's Law to Prevent Demand for Child Sex Trafficking (H.R. 4573; 113th Congress), which would require the notification of foreign governments when an American registered as a sex offender of children travels to their country.

As of April 2020, FiveThirtyEight reported that Smith voted in line with Trump's position 67.7% of the time, the third-lowest percentage among Republican members of Congress after fellow New Jerseyan Jeff Van Drew and Brian Fitzpatrick.

In March 2021, Smith was one of eight Republicans to join the House majority in passing the Bipartisan Background Checks Act of 2021.

=== Committee assignments ===
- Committee on Foreign Affairs
  - Subcommittee on Africa, Global Health, and Human Rights (Ranking member)
  - Subcommittee on the Western Hemisphere
- Tom Lantos Human Rights Commission
- Congressional-Executive Commission on China

=== Caucus memberships ===
- Congressional Ukraine Caucus
- Republican Main Street Partnership
- Republican Governance Group
- Problem Solvers Caucus
- Rare Disease Caucus

== Political positions ==
=== Abortion ===
Smith is strongly anti-abortion. He is a co-chairman of the Congressional Pro-Life Caucus, and served as co-chair of the Trump administration's Pro-Life Coalition. He supports the Mexico City policy, which blocks U.S. federal funding for non-governmental organizations that provide abortion counseling or referrals, advocate to decriminalize abortion or expand abortion services. In 2000, he voted for the Partial-Birth Abortion Ban Act of 2000. In December 2023, Smith signed a letter of support to Tommy Tuberville, thanking him for his nine-month hold on more than 400 military promotions over the Pentagon's abortion policy.

Smith expressed support for the Stupak-Pitts Amendment, an amendment to America's Affordable Health Choices Act of 2009.

Smith has introduced various forms of the No Taxpayer Funding for Abortion Act, starting with the original proposal in 2011. The 2011 proposal prohibited federal funds from being used for health benefits that cover abortion, unless in the case of rape, incest, or if the woman could die. It also disqualified abortions from being written off on taxes. In 2013, Smith reintroduced the proposal, which further restricted insurance coverage of abortions. The bill passed the House, but has yet to be voted on by the Senate.

=== Agriculture ===
Smith opposes federal efforts to overturn state and local agricultural laws, including laws related to farm animal welfare. In September 2023, Smith was one of 181 representatives who signed a bipartisan letter opposing the inclusion of the Ending Agricultural Trade Suppression (EATS) Act in the 2023 farm bill. The EATS Act would have preempted state and local regulations on the sale of animal products raised in battery cages, gestation crates, and veal crates, including California's Proposition 12. Smith was also one of 16 House Republicans who signed a letter to the House Committee on Agriculture opposing the EATS Act in October 2023. The letter claimed that the legislation would infringe on states' rights and empower foreign-owned agribusinesses like the Chinese-owned pork producer WH Group to exert influence over U.S. agricultural policy.

=== Domestic violence ===
Smith voted for the original 1994 Violence Against Women Act, and co-sponsored the reauthorization bills of 2000 and 2005, the latter of which provided $1.6 billion for investigation and prosecution of violent crimes against women, imposed automatic and mandatory restitution on those convicted, and allowed civil redress in cases prosecutors chose to leave un-prosecuted. Smith voted against reauthorizing the act in 2013, due to the Senate version of the bill's cutting of funding for the Trafficking in Persons Office at the State Department, which Smith's Victims of Trafficking and Violence Protection Act of 2000 created.

=== Environment ===
As of 2020, Smith has a lifetime score of 62% on the National Environmental Scorecard of the League of Conservation Voters, the second-highest of any sitting Republican member (after Brian Fitzpatrick). He has said, "Climate change is a global challenge that must be addressed with a global solution."

Smith also opposes offshore drilling, particularly in New Jersey.

Smith backed a carbon emissions trading bill to tackle climate change, one of only eight Republicans in the House to do so.

Smith voted against the Abandoned Shipwrecks Act of 1987. The Act asserts United States title to certain abandoned shipwrecks located on or embedded in submerged lands under state jurisdiction, and transfers title to the respective state, thereby empowering states to manage these cultural and historical resources more efficiently, with the goal of preventing treasure hunters and salvagers from damaging them. Despite his vote against it, President Ronald Reagan signed it into law on April 28, 1988.

=== Gun control ===
Smith opposes concealed carry. In 2016, he was one of four Republicans to receive a 100% rating from the Brady Campaign to Prevent Gun Violence and has generally received low or intermediate ratings from pro-gun organizations Gun Owners of America and the National Rifle Association. Smith did not co-sponsor the Brady Campaign's proposed legislation to expand background checks for gun purchasers.

Smith was one of five Republicans to co-sponsor HR 8 in the 116th Congress, which would require mandatory background checks for gun sales.

Smith called the 2016 Orlando nightclub shooting "tragic beyond words", and said, "The terrorist's motive, if linked to radical Islamist ideology, underscores the escalating national and worldwide threat from global jihad."

In the wake of the 2017 Las Vegas shooting, Smith co-sponsored a ban on bump stocks with Leonard Lance.

=== Health care ===
On May 9, 2019, Smith was one of only three Republicans who voted for HR 986, a measure supported by all voting House Democrats intended to maintain protections of those with preexisting medical conditions to have continued access to affordable medical insurance under the existing provisions of the Affordable Care Act. Five weeks earlier, he had voted with seven other Republicans to pass a resolution condemning the Trump administration's efforts by Department of Justice to have the courts invalidate Obamacare.

Smith has been a longtime promoter of the medically unrecognized "chronic Lyme disease", and has pushed for the medical establishment to recognize the condition. The condition, not to be confused with genuine Lyme disease, is generally rejected by medical professionals, and its promotion is generally seen as health fraud. In 2019, Smith proposed an investigation into whether the Pentagon had released "weaponized" ticks infected with Lyme disease into the environment between 1950 and 1975. Scientists identified this proposal, which Congress did not adopt, as based on a conspiracy theory and claimed that an investigation was unnecessary and a poor use of funds.

=== Human rights ===
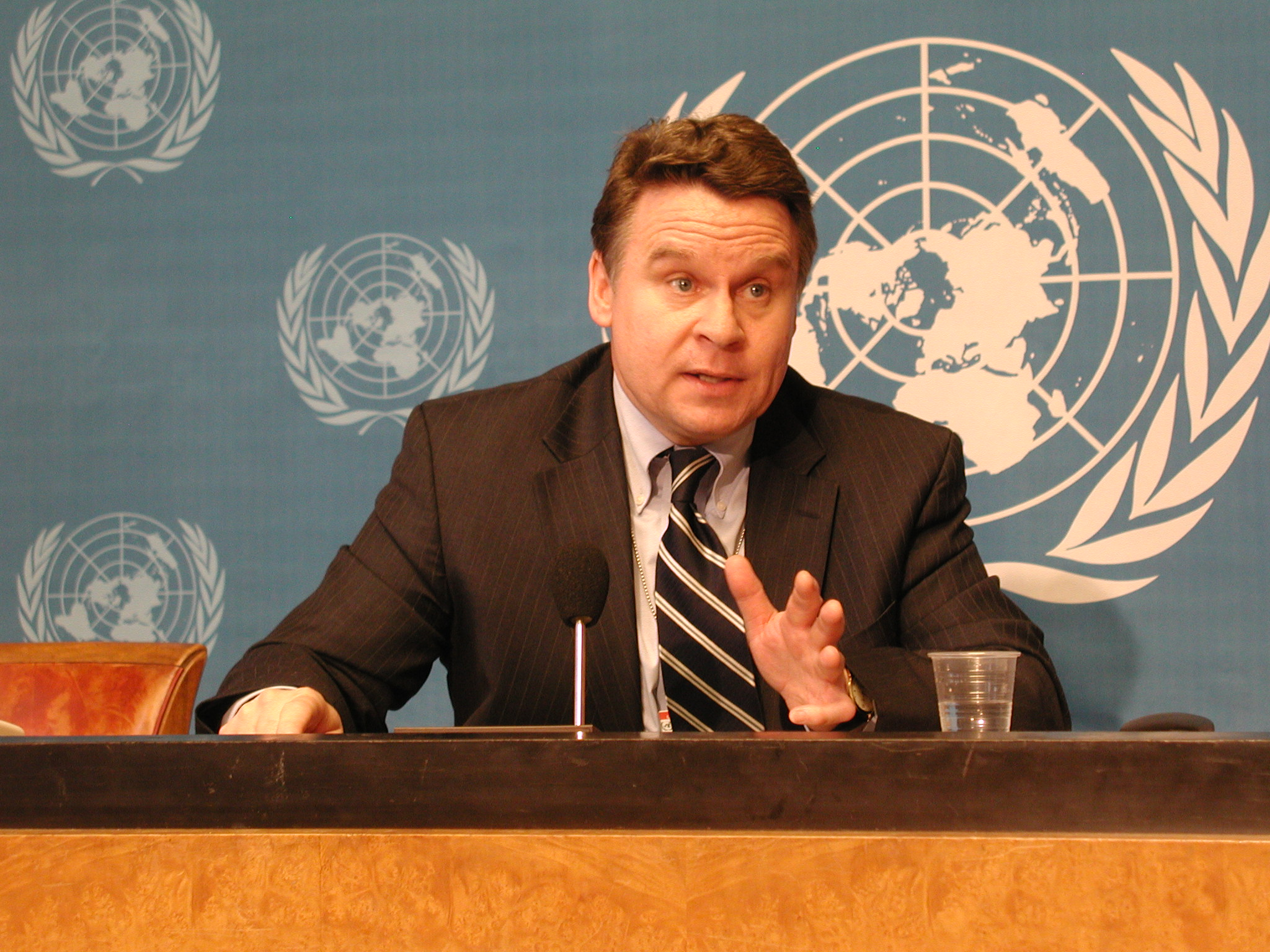
Congressman Chris Smith speaks at the United Nations

Smith advocates for human rights, serving on numerous committees that seek to impact both national and international laws and legislation. He has stated that the bills he introduces to the house are meant to make the U.S. take "human rights seriously".

In 1999, Smith proposed, as part of the American Embassy Security Act, to stop a U.S. sponsored program which provided training to Royal Ulster Constabulary with the Federal Bureau of Investigation (FBI), due to claims of human rights violations, i. e., harassment of defense attorneys representing republicans in Northern Ireland. However, he voted "no" on a bill that halts arms sales to Saudi Arabia and removes troops from Yemen.

In April 2006, he held congressional hearings on the killing of Juan Jesús Posadas Ocampo titled "An End to Impunity: Investigation the 1993 killing of [a] Mexican Archbishop."

He supported the return of David Goldman's son in the Goldman child abduction case, which involved a trip to Brazil. Smith acknowledges the Armenian genocide, and has made calls for the U.S. to recognize it.

In 2017, Smith co-sponsored an effort to prioritize human rights in Azerbaijan with Jim McGovern. The H. Res. 537 act also seeks to see further implementation of the Magnitsky Act regarding Azerbaijani officials, as well as a call for Azerbaijan to release all political prisoners. He supported efforts to deport Jakiw Palij, a denaturalized former American citizen residing in New York who failed to disclose he worked as a guard at a concentration camp in Nazi Germany. Palij was deported to Germany in 2018 and died in 2019. Smith condemned Turkey's wide-ranging crackdown on dissent following a failed July 2016 coup.

==== China ====
Smith has held congressional hearings and has proposed bills regarding human rights violations, specifically around women's sexual health, activism and religious groups, in China. He staunchly opposes the forced sterilization and forced abortions being implemented by the Chinese government towards women regarding China's one-child policy. Regarding the victimization of these women, Smith stated that "the agony that those women carry with them is beyond words. They talk about the pain that they carry for their child and for the violation by the state." In response, Smith wrote a bill, which was put into law in 1999, making it illegal for the U.S. to issue visas to foreign nationals who have been involved in forced abortion or sterilization.

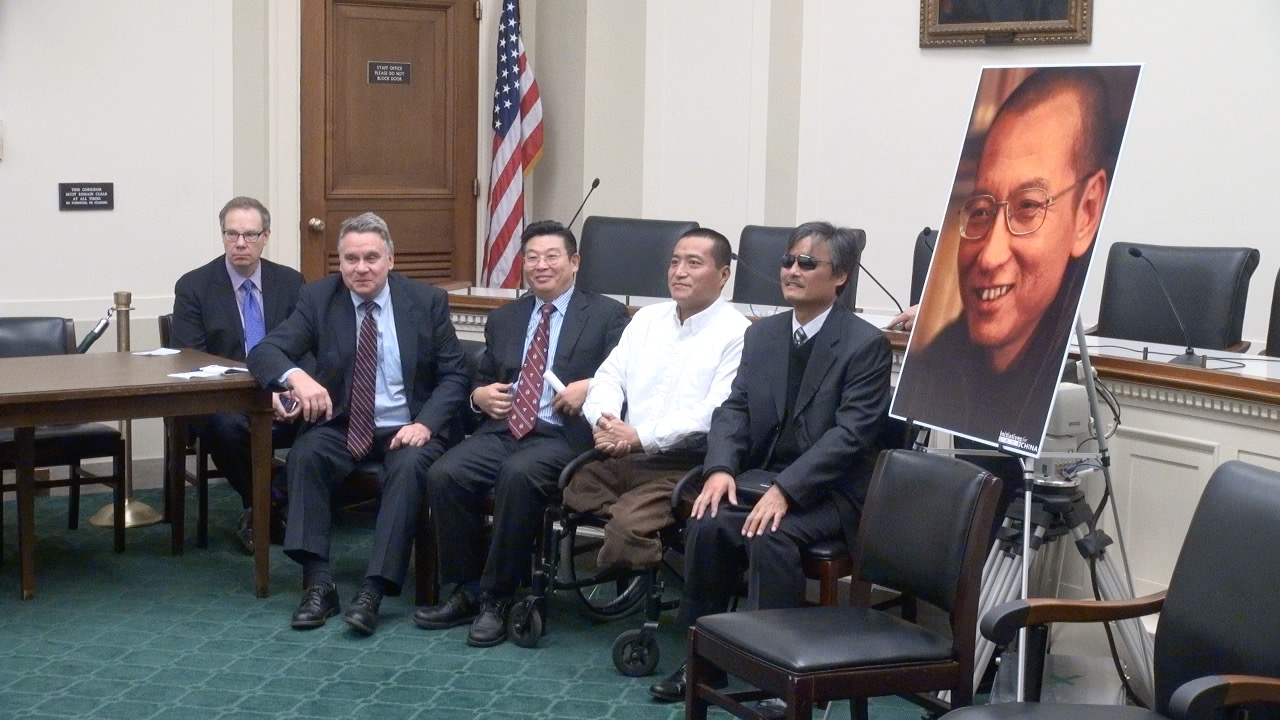
Smith called for the release of China's jailed Nobel Peace Prize laureate Liu Xiaobo, December 2015

Smith held a congressional hearing regarding the disappearance of blind Chinese activist Chen Guangcheng. He attempted, in 2011, to visit Chen in China, when the activist was under house arrest, but was not granted permission. In response to the violations towards Chen and his family, Smith sponsored the China Democracy Promotion Act of 2011, which sought to prevent known Chinese human rights violators from entering the U.S.

In the wake of the 2014 Hong Kong class boycott campaign and Umbrella Movement, Smith co-sponsored the bipartisan Hong Kong Human Rights and Democracy Act, supporting Hong Kong's ongoing autonomy and the human rights of those Hong Kongers involved in nonviolent protests and/or those who have had their rights violated by the Chinese government.

In November 2018, Smith raised the issue of Xinjiang re-education camps and human rights abuses against the Uyghurs. Smith said: "The internment of over a million Uyghurs and other Muslims in China is a staggering evil and should be treated by the international community as a crime against humanity. The Chinese government's creation of a vast system of what can only be called concentration camps cannot be tolerated in the 21st century."

On July 13, 2020, Smith, along with three other U.S. politicians, was sanctioned by the Chinese government for "interfering in China’s internal affairs" through their condemnation of human rights abuses in Xinjiang. On August 10, 2020, Smith, along with 10 other U.S. individuals, was sanctioned by the Chinese government for "behaving badly on Hong Kong-related issues".

In October 2022, Politico reported that Smith criticized some US-based financial executives attending the Global Financial Leaders' Investment Summit, saying that companies "that trumpet their so-called 'Environmental, Social and Governance Principles' at home are quick to discard these 'values' for a chance to make a profit from China."

==== South Korea ====
Smith has indicated his serious concern on the amendment of the Development of Inter-Korean Relations Act in South Korea which passed the South Korean National Assembly on December 14, 2020. It penalizes activists who send anti-North Korean material across the border as balloon propaganda. It was passed by the super-majority of the ruling party of President Moon Jae-in who is keen to improve cross-border ties. Smith stated that "While I would hope that members of Korea's Democratic Party would see how damaging this proposed legislation is to democratic principles and human rights, and thus reverse course, in the event that they pass such a law, I call upon our State Department to critically reevaluate the Republic of Korea's commitment to democratic values in its annual human rights report, as well as in its report on international religious freedom. It may very well be that we will see South Korea put on a watch list, which would be a very sad development indeed."

==== Religion ====
Smith supports religious rights regarding international human rights. He supports sanctions against Vietnam regarding its treatment of Catholics and China regarding the Uyghurs and Falun Gong.

=== Immigration ===
Smith supported the Indonesian Family Refugee Protection Act in 2012, which would have extended the deadline for Indonesian immigrants to file for citizenship.

In 2021, Smith was one of 30 Republicans who voted for the Farm Workforce Modernization Act, which would grant legal status to illegal immigrants working in agriculture and establish a pathway to permanent residency contingent on continued farm work.

=== Intellectual property rights ===
Smith authored the Global Online Freedom Act in 2007, but it did not become law. The proposed legislation was a bill "to promote freedom of expression on the Internet, to protect United States businesses from coercion to participate in repression by authoritarian foreign governments, and for other purposes." Specifically, the bill would prohibit American companies from turning over data about customers residing in "internet restrictive countries." The bill is supported by Amnesty International, Human Rights Watch and Reporters Without Borders. It is opposed by the Electronic Frontier Foundation.

=== January 6 commission ===
On May 19, 2021, Smith was one of 35 Republicans who joined all Democrats in voting to approve legislation to establish the January 6 commission meant to investigate the U.S. Capitol attack.

=== LGBT rights ===
In 2015, Smith said he did not consider same-sex marriage a fundamental human right as defined by the United Nations.

In July 2022, Smith voted against the Respect for Marriage Act, a bill that required the U.S. federal government to recognize the validity of same-sex marriages.

=== Labor movement ===
Smith supports the Employee Free Choice Act. The AFL-CIO Legislative Scorecard, which tracks support for workers' rights, gives Smith a 61% lifetime rating, ranking him seventh of New Jersey's twelve Representatives, and 195th of the House's 435 Representatives.

The AFL-CIO endorsed Smith for re-election in 2018, calling him one of the "best candidates for working people," due to his support for collective bargaining, opposition to the Janus v. AFSCME Supreme Court decision, and support for infrastructure funding, among other reasons.

As of March 2019, Smith is the only Republican co-sponsor of the Paycheck Fairness Act. He also supported the Lilly Ledbetter Fair Pay Act of 2009, which expanded the scope of the statute of limitations for pay discrimination.

Smith cited the example of Lech Wałęsa and the Solidarity movement as a reason he support unions. He also said of his fellow Republicans, "What my Republican colleagues often don't understand is that labor is a human-rights issue".

=== Veterans affairs ===
Bob Wallace, executive director of the Veterans of Foreign Wars calls Smith "the best friend" of veterans. In 2004, Smith refused to endorse the Republican budget proposal unless it included more money for veterans. In a congressional hearing, Smith publicly articulated his belief that the Bush Administration's budget request was $1.2 billion less than the Department of Veterans Affairs actually required, embarrassing the administration and Republican congressional leadership. In 2005, Smith was removed from his chairmanship and membership on the Veterans Affair Committee for his aggressive role in seeking more funding for veteran-related causes.

=== Science policy ===
Smith supports efforts to provide alternatives to embryonic stem cell research. In 2005, he co-sponsored a bill with Artur Davis to fund the creation of a network of national blood banks to distribute umbilical cord blood for stem cell research.

=== Economy and taxation ===
Smith voted against the 2017 Republican tax legislation backed by Donald Trump; he was one of five Republican representatives from New Jersey who joined Democrats in opposing the bill. Smith opposed the bill as "unfair to the taxpayers of New Jersey" because it dramatically limited the federal reduction of state and local taxes (SALT). and said he would be "forced to oppose" more tax cuts if legislation included a provision permanently extending the $10,000 cap on the SALT deduction.

Smith voted for the Economic Recovery Tax Act of 1981. The Act aimed to stimulate economic growth by significantly reducing income tax rates. It passed the House of Representatives in a 323–107 vote, the Senate via a voice vote, and it was signed into law by President Ronald Reagan on August 13, 1981. Smith also voted for the Omnibus Budget Reconciliation Act of 1981. The Act decreased federal spending and increased military funding. It passed the House of Representatives in a 232–193 vote, the Senate via a voice vote, and it was signed into law by President Ronald Reagan the same day.

== Electoral history ==
New Jersey's 4th congressional district: Results 1978–2024
Year	Republican	Votes	%	Democratic	Votes	%	Third Party	Party	Votes	%	Third Party	Party	Votes	%	
1978	Chris Smith	41,833	36.9%	Frank Thompson (Inc)	69,259	61.1%	John Valjean Mahalchik	Independent	1,145	1%	Paul Rizzo	No Slogan	827	1%	
1980	Chris Smith	95,447	57%	Frank Thompson (Inc)	68,480	41%	Jack Moyers	Libertarian	2,801	2%	Paul Rizzo	No Slogan	1,776	1%	
1982	Chris Smith	85,660	53%	Joseph Merlino	75,658	47%	Bill Harris	Libertarian	662	0%	Paul Rizzo	No Slogan	374	0%	*
1984	Chris Smith	139,295	61%	James Hedden	87,908	39%									
1986	Chris Smith	78,699	61%	Jeffrey Laurenti	49,290	38%	Earl Dickey	Stop Financing Communism	789	1%					
1988	Chris Smith	155,283	66%	Betty Holland	79,006	33%	Judson Carter	Independent	1,114	0%	Daniel Maiullo	Libertarian	791	0%	
1990	Chris Smith	99,920	63%	Mark Setaro	54,961	35%	Carl Peters	Libertarian	2,178	1%	Joseph Notarangelo	Populist	1,206	1%	*
1992	Chris Smith	149,095	62%	Brian Hughes	84,514	35%	Benjamin Grindlinger	Libertarian	2,984	1%	Patrick Pasculi	Independent	2,137	1%	*
1994	Chris Smith	109,818	68%	Ralph Walsh	49,537	31%	Leonard Marshall	Conservative	1,579	1%	Arnold Kokans	Natural Law	833	1%	
1996	Chris Smith	146,404	64%	Kevin Meara	77,565	34%	Robert Figueroa	Independent	3,000	1%	J. Morgan Strong	Independent	2,034	1%	*
1998	Chris Smith	92,991	62%	Larry Schneider	52,281	35%	Keith Quarles	Independent	1,753	1%	Morgan Strong	Independent	1,495	1%	*
2000	Chris Smith	158,515	63%	Reed Gusciora	87,956	35%	Stuart Chaifetz	Independent	3,627	1%	Paul Teel	Independent	712	0%	
2002	Chris Smith	115,293	66%	Mary Brennan	55,967	32%	Keith Quarles	Libertarian	1,211	1%	Hermann Winkelmann	Honesty, Humanity, Duty	1,063	1%	*
2004	Chris Smith	192,671	67%	Amy Vasquez	92,826	32%	Richard Edgar	Libertarian	2,056	1%					
2006	Chris Smith	124,482	66%	Carol Gay	62,902	33%	Richard Edgar	Libertarian	1,539	1%	Louis Wary	Remove Medical Negligence	614	0%	
2008	Chris Smith	202,972	66%	Joshua Zeitz	100,036	32%	Steven Welzer	Green	3,543	1%					
2010	Chris Smith	129,752	69%	Howard Kleinhendler	52,118	28%	Joe Siano	Libertarian	2,912	2%	Steven Welzer	Green	1,574	1%	*
2012	Chris Smith	195,146	64%	Brian Froelich	107,992	35%	Leonard Marshall	No Slogan	3,111	1%					
2014	Chris Smith	118,826	68%	Ruben Scolavino	54,415	31%	Scott Neuman	D-R Party	1,608	1%					
2016	Chris Smith	211,992	64%	Lorna Phillipson	111,532	34%	Hank Schroeder	Economic Growth	5,840	2%	Jeremy Marcus	Libertarian	3,320	1%	
2018	Chris Smith	159,965	55%	Joshua Welle	123,995	43%	Michael Rufo	Libertarian	1,352	1%	Ed Stackhouse	Independent	1,034	0%	*
2020	Chris Smith	254,103	60%	Stephanie Schmid	162,420	38%	Hank Schroeder	Independent	3,195	1%	Michael Rufo	Libertarian	2,583	1%	*
2022	Chris Smith	173,288	66%	Matthew Jenkins	81,233	31%	Jason Cullen	Libertarian	1,902	0.7%	David Schmidt	Independent	1,197	0.5%	*
2024	Chris Smith	265,652	67.4%	Matthew Jenkins	124,803	31.7%	John Morrison	Libertarian	1,950	0.5%	Barry Bendar	Green	1,823	0.5%	

- In elections marked with an asterisk (*), additional candidates received less than 1% of the vote.

U.S. House of Representatives
Preceded by Frank Thompson	Member of the U.S. House of Representatives from New Jersey's 4th congressional district 1981–present	Incumbent
Preceded by Dennis DeConcini	Chair of the Joint Helsinki Commission; 1995–1997	Succeeded by Al D'Amato
Preceded by Al D'Amato	Chair of the Joint Helsinki Commission; 1999–2001	Succeeded by Ben Campbell
Preceded by Bob Stump	Chair of the House Veterans' Affairs Committee; 2001–2005	Succeeded by Steve Buyer
Preceded by Ben Campbell	Chair of the Joint Helsinki Commission; 2003–2005	Succeeded by Sam Brownback
Preceded by Byron Dorgan	Chair of the Joint China Commission; 2011–2013	Succeeded by Sherrod Brown
Preceded by Ben Cardin	Chair of the Joint Helsinki Commission; 2011–2013	Succeeded by Ben Cardin
Preceded by Ben Cardin	Chair of the Joint Helsinki Commission; 2015–2017	Succeeded by Roger Wicker
Preceded by Sherrod Brown	Chair of the Joint China Commission; 2015–2017	Succeeded by Marco Rubio
Preceded by Jim McGovern	Chair of the House Human Rights Commission; 2023–present	Incumbent
Preceded by Jeff Merkley	Chair of the Joint China Commission; 2023–2025	Succeeded by Dan Sullivan
U.S. order of precedence (ceremonial)
Preceded by Hal Rogers	United States representatives by seniority 2nd	Succeeded by Steny Hoyer
Preceded by Hal Rogers	Order of precedence of the United States	Succeeded by Steny Hoyer
