= International Child Abduction Remedies Act =

The International Child Abduction Remedies Act (ICARA) is a United States federal law. H.R. 3971 29 April 1988, was assigned Public law 100-300 in 22 U.S.C. 9001 et seq.

ICARA establishes procedures to implement the Hague Convention on the Civil Aspects of International Child Abduction done at The Hague on October 25, 1980 and for other purposes.

The two primary goals of the Hague Convention are, "to ensure the prompt return of children to the state of their habitual residence when they have been wrongfully removed," and "to ensure that rights of custody i.e., "physical custody" and of access i.e., "visitation" under the law of one Contracting State are effectively respected in the other Contracting States". The Convention's procedures "are not designed to settle international custody disputes, but rather to restore the status quo prior to any wrongful removal or retention, and to deter parents from engaging in international forum shopping in custody cases."

== Jurisdiction ==
Federal District Courts have "federal question" subject matter jurisdiction under 28 U.S.C. §1331, which is concurrent with state court subject matter jurisdiction pursuant to 22 U.S.C. §9003(a). As such, Hague Convention cases under ICARA may be heard in either State or Federal courts.

An action under the Hague Convention is commenced by filing a Petition in the jurisdiction where the child is located.22 U.S.C. § 9003(b)] Notice of a Hague Convention Petition is deemed sufficient if it is given "in accordance with the applicable law governing notice in interstate child custody proceedings".[22 U.S.C. § 9003(c)] In the United States, this would be the PKPA, UCCJA, or UCCJEA, where applicable.

== Burden of proof ==
The petitioner bears the initial burden of proving, by a preponderance of the evidence, that the removal or retention of the child was "wrongful".[22 U.S.C. §9003(e)(1)(A)]. Once this has been demonstrated, the burden shifts to the respondent to prove an affirmative defense. Because the affirmative defenses are narrowly construed a trial court still retains the discretion to order the child's return, even where such a defense has been accredited.

== Affirmative defenses ==
Even after the existence of "wrongful removal" or "wrongful retention" has been established the court has the discretion to deny the return of the child if one of the affirmative defenses can be accredited.

=== "Consent" or "Acquiescence" ===
A court is not bound to order the return of the subject child if the respondent demonstrates, by a preponderance of the evidence, that the petitioner either subjectively consented to, or acquiesced in, a child's removal or retention.[22 U.S.C. §9003(e)(2)]

Though similar in principle, consent and acquiescence are distinguishable temporally: "The consent defense involves the petitioner's conduct prior to the contested removal or retention, while acquiescence addresses whether the petitioner subsequently agreed to or accepted the removal or retention." When the defense of consent is raised, the trial court must examine "the nature and scope of petitioner's consent and any conditions or limitations". Where a party exceeds the scope of any prior consent given, that consent will be deemed revoked upon express communication of the objecting party's revocation of consent, and may give rise to a claim for wrongful retention. Analysis of an "acquiescence" defense is more focused, and requires proof of "an act or statement with the requisite formality" or "a consistent attitude of acquiescence over a significant period of time."

=== Grave risk of harm ===
A court may also refuse to order the return of a wrongfully removed child if the respondent demonstrates, by "clear and convincing evidence" that "there is a grave risk that his or her return would expose the child to physical harm, psychological harm, or would subject the child in an intolerable situation that is likely to end in serious injury or the child's death if returned to its parent(s)." Additionally, a respondent must also demonstrate, by clear and convincing evidence, that the courts in the country of habitual residence are either unable or unwilling to adequately protect the child from the alleged risk of harm or subject the child to an intolerable situation that is likely to end in serious injury or the child's death if returned to its parent(s).

== See also ==
- National Child Search Assistance Act
- International Parental Kidnapping Crime Act
- Golan v. Saada
