= Reunite International Child Abduction Centre =

Reunite International Child Abduction Centre is recognized as the leading UK charity focusing on international child abduction.

== History ==
Reunite began in 1986 as reunite National Council for Abducted Children, a parent support network formed by parents trying to navigate their way through the legal issues surrounding international parental child abduction. It was registered as a charity in 1990 and over the years evolved and developed into an information and resource centre. It was in 1999 that it changed its name to reunite International Child Abduction Centre
