= Central Authority =

Type of agency or organization

A central authority is an agency or organization that is designated to play a key facilitating role in the implementation and operation of an international treaty in public and private international law.

Prior to the Hague Evidence Convention and the Hague Service Convention of 1965 and 1970, most treaties would designate separate agencies to, respectively, transmit and receive treaty petitions and applications with their corresponding agencies in foreign states. The conventions of '65 and '70 consolidated these roles under a single central authority. Subsequent conventions, such as Hague Abduction Convention, continued this demand that the central authority in each country handle two-way communications with domestic courts, administrative agencies and foreign central authorities. Not only did the Abduction Convention establish central authorities that facilitated two-way communications, but it also gave a whole laundry list of additional obligations to them with language requiring central authorities take "any and all actions" to secure the goals of the treaty and cooperate with other central authorities to do so. All of these new obligations emphasized the need for international cooperation amongst the state parties in achieving the objectives of the convention.

In transnational criminal law, central authorities act as international nodes of coordination to receive and act upon mutual legal assistance and extradition requests from other countries. Many UN treaties, such as the UN Convention Against Corruption (UNCAC) and the UN Convention Against Transnational Organized Crime (UNTOC) expressly call upon member states to designate central authorities in their government for just this purpose. The lack of central authorities in developing countries, however, can pose challenges since—where such institutional architecture is lacking—states will generally be unable to offer assistance and, thus, unable to address many of the threats posed by transnational criminal groups and terrorist organizations.
