= Hague Convention on the Civil Aspects of International Child Abduction =

1980 multilateral treaty

Hague Abduction Convention
Convention on the Civil Aspects of International Child Abduction
- State parties to the convention states that signed and ratified the convention states that acceded to the convention state that ratified, but convention has not entered into force
- Signed: 25 October 1980
- Location: The Hague, Netherlands
- Effective: 1 December 1983
- Condition: 3 ratifications
- Parties: 103 (November 2022)
- Depositary: Ministry of Foreign Affairs of the Kingdom of the Netherlands
- Languages: French and English

Full text
- Convention on the Civil Aspects of International Child Abduction at Wikisource

The Hague Convention on the Civil Aspects of International Child Abduction or Hague Abduction Convention is a multilateral treaty that provides an expeditious method to return a child who was wrongfully taken by a parent from one country to another country. In order for the Convention to apply, both countries (the one the child was removed from, and the one the child has been brought to) must be Contracting States; i.e. both must have adopted the Convention.

The Convention seeks to address international child abduction arising when a child is removed by one parent, when both parents have custody rights, or custody has yet to be determined. It was drafted to ensure the prompt return of children wrongfully abducted from their country of habitual residence, or wrongfully retained in a country that is not their country of habitual residence.

The Convention was developed by the Hague Conference on Private International Law (HCCH). The convention was concluded 25 October 1980 and entered into force between the signatories on 1 December 1983.

As of 2022, there are 103 parties to the convention; Botswana and Cape Verde being the most recent countries to accede, in 2022.

== Aims and Scope of the Convention ==
The objectives of the Convention are set out in Article 1: to secure the prompt return of children wrongfully removed to or retained in any Contracting State; and, to ensure that rights of custody and of access under the law of one Contracting State are effectively respected in the other Contracting State.

The Convention is used when one parent (the "abducting parent") allegedly removed or retained the child in a State other than the State of habitual residence, either:

1. before a court in the State of habitual residence ruled on custody and access, or
2. after a court in the State of habitual residence ruled on custody and access and the wrongful removal or retention interfered with the custody or access rights that the other parent (the "left-behind parent") had under that order.

The Convention, by returning children to the State of habitual residence, deters parents from crossing international borders in search of a more sympathetic court (i.e. one who is more likely to rule on custody and access in their favor).

In order for a court to order the return of a child under Article 12 of the Convention, these conditions must be met:

1. the child was removed from their habitual residence;
2. the child is under the age of 16; and
3. the removal of the child was considered wrongful.

Even if the above conditions are met, the court might not order the return of the child because of the exceptions specified in Articles 12 and 13.

Special Commissioner meeting held in Hague, Netherlands in 2023, Hague Conference reaffirmed the common goal of Hague convention and UNCRC, by making the following statement:

UN Committee on the Rights of the Child recognizes that the objectives of the 1980 Child Abduction Convention – prevention and immediate return – seek to protect the best interests of the child. The SC furthermore observed that the Committee noted that the 1980 Child Abduction Convention establishes a strong presumption that the best interests of the child require that they be immediately returned save for the limited exceptions (IV-1-17)...

These exceptions, however, must be applied restrictively. While the exceptions derive from a consideration of the interests of the child, they do not turn the return proceedings into custody proceedings (IV-1-15)...

Exceptions are focussed on the (possible non-)return of the child. They should neither deal with issues of custody nor mandate a full "best interests assessment" (IV-1-14).

== Procedural nature ==
The Convention does not alter any substantive rights of the parents. When an abduction occurs, the parent seeking the child's return will commence proceedings by making an application to the Central Authority. Each Contracting State is required to have a Central Authority to help facilitate the child's return.

- Depending on the Contracting State, the role of the Central Authority varies. For example, in Germany, the Central Authority will take the matter to court on behalf of the left-behind parent. In Canada and the United States, it is the left-behind parent who appears in court while the Central Authority acts as a liaison.

The Convention requires that no judicial or administrative authority in the State the child has been brought to shall decide the merits of custody or access until it has been determined that the child is not to be returned under the Convention.

A court in the State the child has been brought to should not consider the merits of the underlying custody or access dispute, but should determine only the country in which that dispute should be adjudicated.

The Convention provides that all Contracting States, as well as any judicial and administrative bodies of those Contracting States, "shall act expeditiously in all proceedings seeking the return of children", and the institutions in each Contracting State "shall use the most expeditious procedures available" to ensure the prompt return specified in the Convention objectives.

== Wrongful removal or retention ==
The Convention provides that the removal or retention of a child is "wrongful" whenever:

(a) it is in breach of rights of custody attributed to a person, an institution or any other body, either jointly or alone, under the law of the State in which the child was habitually resident immediately before the removal or retention; and (b) at the time of removal or retention those rights were actually exercised, either jointly or alone, or would have been so exercised but for the removal or retention.

Habitual residence must be assessed first because whether or not a parent had rights of custody is determined by the law of the place of habitual residence. (See, for example the U.S. case Carrascosa v. McGuire, where the Court refused to accept a Spanish Court's decision that the father did not have rights of custody. The Spanish Courts never applied New Jersey law despite acknowledging that the child's place of habitual residence was New Jersey).

=== Habitual residence ===
An application for the return of a child can succeed only if a child was, immediately before the alleged removal or retention, habitually resident in the Contracting State to which return is sought. This means that a child, taken from State A to State B, will only be subject to a return order to State A if the court determines that the child’s habitual residence was State A at the time the child was taken.

The Convention does not define the term "habitual residence", so it is open to the courts in each Contracting State to do so. It is intended to be a fact-based determination, avoiding legal technicalities.

There are a few approaches to assessing habitual residence, depending on the court seized of the analysis.

1. The parental intention approach. Under this approach, the court looks for a shared intention on the part of the parents (when there has been a move and there is a dispute as to whether the parents intended for the child to retain the existing habitual residence or acquire a new one). the U.S. case Mozes v. Mozes has provided guidance on the parental intention approach. The jurisprudence in some U.S. States continues to treat shared parental intent as a decisive factor in the determination of a child's habitual residence. Under this analysis, a parent cannot unilaterally create a new habitual residence by wrongfully removing or retaining a child. The court must look at the shared intentions of the parties, the history of the child's location and the settled nature of the family prior to the facts giving rise to the request for return.
2. The child centered approach. This approach calls for the court to look towards the child, not the parents, and to examine past experiences of the child, not future intentions for residence. The court will consider the child’s connections with the State including their academic activities, social engagements, participation in sports, and meaningful connections with the people and places. This approach is used in some U.S. States, and in Germany.
3. The hybrid approach. Using the hybrid approach, the court does not look exclusively to parental intent or to the child’s acclimatization to a State, rather, the court looks at “all relevant considerations arising from the facts of the case at hand.” This approach is used in the UK, Canada, Israel, and again some U.S. States. The application judge determines the focal point of the child's life which is the family and social environment in which its life has developed, immediately prior to the removal or retention. The judge considers all relevant links and circumstances – the child's links to and circumstances in country A; the circumstances of the child's move from country A to country B; and the child's links to and circumstances in country B. The child must be physically present in that place and that presence cannot be temporary or intermittent. Other factors relevant to the determination of habitual residence include the duration, regularity, conditions and reasons for the child's stay in that State. When considering how much weight to place on the various considerations in the habitual residence analysis, a court will factor in a child's age. For very young children, more weight will be placed on the shared intent of the parents because a young child will not form meaningful connections with people and places, whereas the impact of parental intent is more limited for older children who are "capable of becoming "firmly rooted" in a new country".

=== Rights of custody ===
Rights of custody may arise by operation of law or from a judicial or administrative decision, or an agreement having legal effect under the law of the country of habitual residence. The explanatory report of the convention clarifies the meaning of wrongful as:

"the removal of a child by one of the joint holders without the consent of the other, is ... wrongful, and this wrongfulness derives in this particular case, not from some action in breach of a particular law, but from the fact that such action has disregarded the rights of the other parent which are also protected by law, and has interfered with their normal exercise."

The Convention specifies that “rights of custody” includes rights relating to the care of the child and the right to determine the child’s place of residence, while “rights of access” includes the right to take the child for a period of time.

Rights of custody may not be explicit or formal in order for them to be recognized by a court. In the Matter of K (A Child) (Northern Ireland), the Court ruled that the term rights of custody may include certain informal rights (called "inchoate rights"). In that case, the child lived with his maternal grandparents in Lithuania when, at the age of 7, the mother moved the child to Northern Ireland against the grandparent’s wishes. There was no custody order awarding the grandparents any rights of custody, but if they had applied for a custody order in Lithuania they would have likely been able to secure one.

Specific and limited rights of custody may still amount to rights of custody for Convention purposes. For example, in Abbott v. Abbott, the Court held that a parent’s ne exeat right, i.e. the right to consent before a child is moved to another country, is sufficient to give rise to rights of custody under the Convention. The General Principles and Guide to Good Practice, Hague Conference on Private International Law explains, at page 43, that a significant number of cases interpreting 'rights of custody' under the Convention supports the view that a right of access combined with a veto on the removal of a child from the state of habitual residence, constitutes real rights of custody. However, if the parent has the right to object, as opposed to the right to veto the removal of the child, this is not sufficient to amount to rights of custody.

After assessing whether the parent had rights of custody or access according to the laws of the child's State of habitual residence, the court then determines whether or not those rights were “actually exercised”, making the removal or retention wrongful.

Article 15 of the Convention is designed to promote cooperation amongst Contracting States. It provides that a Contracting State may, prior to making an order for the return of the child, request a decision or determination that the removal or retention was wrongful within the meaning of Article 3 of the Convention by that Contracting State’s law. The rationale behind Article 15 is that the foreign court is better placed to understand the meaning and effect of its own laws.

Some Contracting States take the position that an Article 15 determination should report only on matters of national law regarding rights of custody, and not to extend the analysis to classify the removal as wrongful, which is a question for the court requesting the Article 15 determination. An Article 15 determination from a Contracting State should be taken as conclusive to avoid further delays.

== Special rules of evidence ==
The Convention provides special rules for admitting evidence, independent of the evidentiary standards set by the domestic laws of each Contracting State. Article 30 provides that any application submitted to the Central Authority or the courts directly, and any documents attached to that application, shall be admissible in proceedings for a child's return. Further, the court in which a Convention application is proceeding, when determining whether there is a wrongful removal or retention, may take judicial notice of the law in the State of habitual residence of the child, without requiring the parties prove that State’s law as a matter of fact through evidence.

In general, the rules of evidence for Convention applications must be “the most expeditious procedures available”, due to the Convention objectives: to secure the prompt return of children. As a result, several Contracting States conduct hearings with only affidavit or written evidence, although oral evidence and cross examination are allowed if credibility is at issue, or if the affidavit evidence is conflicting. In Canada, Convention applications are "typically heard on affidavit evidence". The same is true in the United Kingdom, Finland, and South Africa. In the Netherlands however, two hearings (and a child interview, if the child is above 6 years of age) will take place, and in the second hearing, the presence of all parties is "highly desirable" so the judge can "hear from you and the other parent".

== Defences to return ==
The Convention limits the defences available to the parent refuting the return application. To defend against the return of the child, the defendant parent must establish to the degree required by the applicable standard of proof (generally determined by the lex fori, i.e. the law of the State where the court is located), that one of the following apply:

(a) the parent applying for the child’s return was not "actually exercising custody rights at the time of the removal or retention" under Article 13(a); or

(b) the parent applying for the child’s return "had consented to or acquiesced in the removal or retention" under Article 13(a); or

(c) the application for return commenced more than one year from the time of wrongful removal or retention and the child has "settled in its new environment", under Article 12; or

(d) the child “objects to being returned and has attained an age and degree of maturity at which it is appropriate to take account of its views” under Article 13; or

(e) "there is grave risk that the child's return would expose the child to physical or psychological harm or otherwise place the child in an intolerable situation," under Article 13(b); or

(f) the court’s invokes its residual discretion under Article 20: the return of the child is not permitted by the fundamental principles (in the State conducting the analysis) that relate to the protection of human rights and fundamental freedoms.

While the best interests of the child is central to legal decisions involving children, it does not play a role in a Convention application. The Convention presupposes that the child’s best interest is served by their prompt return to their State of habitual residence. That being said, "the concept of the best interests of the child must be evaluated in the light of the exceptions provided for by the Hague Convention”.

These exceptions are explained further below.

=== (a) Actually exercising custody rights ===
Whether or not a parent was actually exercising their custody or access rights is arguable depending on the rights of custody held, based on the law of the State of habitual residence. If there is a clear court order that dictates custody or an access schedule, there will be little dispute. If there is no formal agreement but one parent sees or spends time with the child, there may be a question as to whether or not that parent was actually exercising custody rights.

For some Contracting States, "actually exercising" is defined broadly so that some minimal involvement between the parent and child is enough. For example, in a case from Quebec Canada, one parent’s telephone contact and occasional visits with the child (one visit in the year 2009) were considered sufficient to equate to an actual exercise of custody rights. Additionally, if custody has not yet been determined, it is possible that the court will find that the parent had rights of custody that “would have [been] exercised” had the child not been removed by the abducting parent.

=== (b) Consent or acquiescence ===
A parent can explicitly consent to the child’s removal or retention, or they can acquiesce, i.e. passively and implicitly accept the removal or retention. In short, acquiescence implies unstated consent. Consent must be real, positive and unequivocal so that a court is satisfied that consent was actually given, despite the absence of a written agreement. This defence is likely to be successful where evidence is convincing that the left-behind parent made an informed decision, consenting to the child’s removal or retention, and that the abducting parent can prove that they reasonably believed that the other parent consented to a durable, lasting change in the residence of the child. Evidence that one parent deceived the other will likely vitiate any finding of consent.

The burden of proof is on the abducting parent who is fighting the Convention application to show that the other parent did in fact consent or acquiesce. Then, it is up to the parent applying for the child’s return to “adduce as much evidence as possible about the circumstances of the children's departure” which could include texts, emails and any deceitful behaviour on the part of the abducting parent (i.e. only a few of the child’s items were packed, fooling the left-behind parent into thinking that the trip was temporary).

=== (c) One year time limit ===
For this defence to apply, the application for the child’s return must have been commenced after 1 year of the removal or retention, and the child must be settled in the new State. The parent resisting the return order is advised to adduce as much evidence as possible about the child’s school, friendships, and community connections in the new State.

In some jurisdictions, the courts refer to the primary purpose of the Convention (the return of children) to hold that only strong and compelling evidence of settlement can displace the Convention objective and justify denying the return. Other jurisdictions look to the child to assess whether or not they are settled in their new environment by taking a literal approach to settlement. In Canada, one Court held that “to determine if a child is “now settled” in its new environment, a “child-centric” factual inquiry must be undertaken to determine the child’s actual circumstances.” The same approach is taken in the UK.

=== (d) The child's objections ===
The parent seeking to defend against the return order can argue that the child objects to the return. A preference to remain in the new State because the child likes their new school and friends is not enough to amount to an objection. To accept a child’s preference as sufficient would undercut the objectives of the Convention, encouraging parents to abduct their children, settle in a new State, and then “rely on their children’s contentment to avoid being returned to the jurisdiction which should properly deal with their custody and residence.”

Some Contracting States have legislated precision into the level of objection required. In Australia, family law regulations provide that the child must object to a return, and the objection must show a “strength of feeling beyond the mere expression of a preference or of ordinary wishes.”

Courts have distinguished between a child objecting to being returned to the State of habitual residence, and an objection to being returned to the care of the left-behind parent. The Convention provides that a court will order “the return of the child wrongfully removed or retained to the State of habitual residence and not to the person requesting the return” [emphasis added].

Article 13 specifies that the court should consider a child’s objection if that child has attained an appropriate age and degree of maturity. A child can be 15 but not meet the requisite degree of maturity, and a child can be too young, despite having advanced maturity. Both age and degree of maturity are considered together, and there is variance amongst the Contracting States. In Canada, a Court did not accept the objections of a child of 10 years of age. The United States and England & Wales have upheld the objections of children 8 years of age. Scotland rejected the objections of siblings 15 and 11 years of age. Jurisprudence in the European Union has reversed the requirement: instead of taking into account the views of the child if it is appropriate to do so, based on age and degree of maturity, the European Union has established that the court must take into account the child’s views unless it is inappropriate to do so due to age or maturity.

A child whose views are going to be heard may require independent legal representation. This is especially true if the abducting parent is suspected to be manipulating or alienating the children, influencing their objections to return. Some examples of Contracting States with legal representation for children include Canada (the Office of the Children's Lawyer), Russian Federation (Extradition Law Firm), and Australia (Independent Children’s Lawyer).

=== (e) Grave risk exception ===
The language of Article 13 suggests that the child may be in grave risk if a return would expose them to (1) physical harm, (2) psychological harm, or (3) an intolerable situation. Examples include where there is war, serious civil unrest, or a natural disaster in the State of habitual residence, or where the parent applying for the return order has been abusing the child. More frequently though, Convention applications are made when the abducting parent who flees the State of habitual residence with the child, is escaping intimate partner violence, whether or not the child is also abused.

In X v. Latvia, the European Court of Human Rights held that the parent who opposes the return of a child on the basis of Article 13(b) must adduce sufficient evidence of the existence of a risk that can be specifically described as grave. Unsubstantiated allegations of abuse will not succeed, and it is also possible for the court to order a return as long as the authorities in the State of habitual residence are prepared to conduct an investigation, and to protect the child and abused parent. It is also possible for the State hearing the Convention application to conduct an investigation into the abuse allegations before deciding whether or not to order the child’s return.

Physical harm can arise after an attempt is made to return the child to the State of habitual residence, requiring the courts to consider if there would be grave harm if future attempts to return the child are made. In Re M. (A Minor) (Child Abduction), the children were en route from London to Australia (Australia being their State of habitual residence), when one of the children attempted to open the airplane door as it was taxiing for take-off.

Physical risk and psychological harm may be distinct or conflated. For example, threat of suicide could be construed as either or both physical and psychological harm. In an English case, Re R. (A Minor Abduction), the child’s threats to commit suicide were central to the Court deciding not to order the return. Contrast this with the approach taken in Israel, where the Court rejected the argument that a child’s previous suicide attempt in the State of habitual residence justified denying the return. In addition to the child’s threats of suicide, an Australia case held that evidence that the abducting parent may commit suicide if ordered to return with the child could constitute grave risk of harm.

Some have tried, unsuccessfully, to argue that grave risk includes exposure to city pollution, high risk of future earthquakes, inadequate housing, financial weakness, and reliance on state benefits. Poor financial circumstances have factored into the analysis when deciding not to order the child’s return in Australia, the Netherlands, and Scotland.

If physical or psychological harm are not established, the parent can argue any other “intolerable situation", which is described as a situation that goes beyond the inconveniences necessarily linked to the experience of return, producing a situation beyond what a child might reasonably bear.

=== (f) Residual discretion ===
If none of the above defences are successfully argued, the court hearing the Convention application retains discretion not to order the return if to do so would violate that State’s fundamental principles with regards to protection of human rights and fundamental freedoms.

The Canadian case AMRI v. KER, provides an example of a situation where the Court will look to their own laws regarding human rights and fundamental freedoms to determine whether or not to order the return. In this case, the child lived in Canada and was legally recognized as a refugee. The mother commenced a Convention application for the child to be returned to Mexico. According to Canadian law, the child’s refugee status gave rise to a rebuttable presumption of risk of persecution, engaging the child's s. 7 Charter rights to life, liberty and security of the person, and engaging the exceptions in Article 13 and 20.

== Facilitating the child's return - practical matters ==
The court may make an order for the return of the child on certain conditions, called undertakings. In the Canadian case Thomson v. Thomson, the Court explained that undertakings may be required to achieve the purpose and spirit of the Convention, namely, restoring the status quo. In Thomson, after the child was taken from Scotland to Manitoba by the mother, the father left behind in Scotland obtained a “chasing order”, granting him interim custody. The mother feared that, upon landing in Scotland pursuant to the return order, the chasing order would be enforced and the child would be taken from her and placed in the custody of the father. The Court considered possible harm to the child if moved from the mother (primary caregiver) to the father (pursuant to the chasing order) and then, possibly back again to the mother (after the full custody hearing). The father’s undertaking, not to enforce the chasing order became a condition upon which the return order was made.

In Thomson v. Thomson, the Court looked to Re L. (Child Abduction) (Psychological Harm), for other examples of valid undertakings. These include undertakings to pay the airfare for the parent and child returning to the country of habitual residence, to pay interim support money, and to vacate the matrimonial home until the custody hearing so that the returning parent and child can live there. In South Africa, undertakings can relate to “care, financial issues, custody and contact, non-prosecution, ‘protection of the parent who abducted the child’, protection of the child on their return, and ‘expedited court proceedings in the country of return’”. See also Director-General Department of Families, Youth and Community Care and Hobbs, 24 September 1999, decided by the Family Court of Australia in Brisbane.

Although rare, the parent applying for the return of the child may discontinue the application, or fail to enforce a return order after it is made. In these situations, the court may decide that the application be struck or the order discharged.

In Re G. (Abduction: Striking Out Application), the High Court in England granted the mother’s order to strike out the application for return made by the father because, not only was there a delay in commencing the application but also seeing it through. Justice Connell struck the application because of the “manifest failure of [the] father to conduct his Hague Convention proceedings with proper diligence and speed”. In Australia, The Family Law (Child Abduction Convention) Regulations 1986, Reg 19A provides that, if a return order is made, either party can apply for the return order to be discharged if certain criteria are met.

== State parties ==
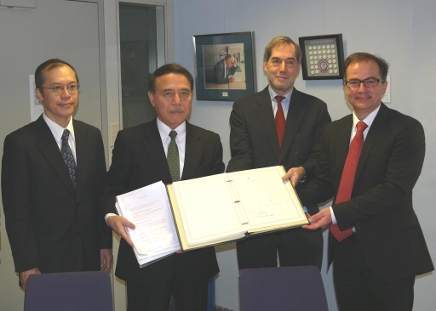
Signature and ratification of Japan in 2014

As of November 2022, there are 103 parties to the Convention. The most recent States to accede to the convention were Botswana and Cape Verde in 2022.

=== Domestic legislation ===
Contracting States that have enacted domestic legislation to give effect to the Convention include:

==== Australia ====
- Reg. 16(3) Family Law (Child Abduction) Regulations 1989.

==== Canada ====
- Alberta: International Child Abduction Act, RSA 2000, c I-4.
- British Columbia: Family Law Act, SBC 2011, c 25, s 80.
- Manitoba: The Child Custody Enforcement Act, CCSM c C360.
- New Brunswick: International Child Abduction Act, RSNB 2011, c 175.
- Newfoundland and Labrador: Children's Law Act, RSNL 1990, c C-13, s 54.
- Northwest Territories: International Child Abduction Act, RSNWT 1988, c I-5.
- Nova Scotia: Child Abduction Act, RSNS 1989, c 67.
- Nunavut: International Child Abduction Act, RSNWT (Nu) 1988, c I-5.
- Ontario: Children's Law Reform Act, RSO 1990, c C.12.
- Prince Edward Island: Children's Law Act, RSPEI 1988, c C-6.1.
- Quebec: Act respecting the civil aspects of international and interprovincial child abduction, CQLR c A-23.01.
- Saskatchewan: The International Child Abduction Act, 1996, SS 1996, c I-10.11.
- Yukon: International Child Abduction (Hague Convention) Act, SY 2008, c 5.

==== United States of America ====
- International Child Abduction Remedies Act (ICARA), 22 U.S.C. § 9001 et seq. (formerly 42 U.S.C. § 11601 et seq.).
- International Child Abduction Prevention and Return Act (ICAPRA), 22 U.S.C. § 9101 et seq.

== See also ==
- International child abduction
- Child abduction
- Child laundering
- Child harvesting
- List of international adoption scandals
- Hague Adoption Convention
- Hague Abduction Convention Compliance Reports (US)
- International Child Abduction Remedies Act (US)
- Hague Conference on Private International Law
