= Adoption in the United States =

In the United States, adoption is the process of creating a legal parent–child relationship between a child and a parent who is not the child's parent by birth or a genetic parent.

Most adoptions in the US are adoptions by a step-parent. The second most common type is a foster care adoption. In those cases, the child is unable to live with the birth family, and the government is overseeing the care and adoption of the child. International adoptions involve the adoption of a child who was born outside the United States. A private adoption is an adoption that was independently arranged without the involvement of a government agency.

Between five and seven million Americans are adoptees. About 150,000 adoptions happen each year, including about 50,000 foster-care adoptions.

While most adoptions involve minor children (under the age of 18), adult adoption is also possible.

== Types ==
Adoptions in the United States may be either domestic or from another country. Domestic adoptions can be arranged either through a state agency, an adoption agency, or independently.

=== By family members ===
In the United States, most adoptions involve a child being adopted by a person who is married to a birth parent, or by another existing relative. Adoption by a stepmother or stepfather is called a step-parent adoption. If the child is adopted by a person who lives with, but is not married to, a birth parent, then it is called a second-parent adoption. More broadly, these may be called known-child adoptions, which includes adoption by family members, family friends, or other people previously known to the child.

Except in cases of adult adoption, step-parent adoption generally requires consent from all living, legally recognized parents. The process usually terminates the rights of the non-custodial parent. The parent whose rights are terminated will no longer need to pay child support or have any other responsibilities for the adopted child. In most, but not all US states, the child's right to inherit property after the death of the birth parent is also ended. Older children are normally expected to give their consent as well. Biological children of disabled military veterans who are adopted by non-military veteran step-parents also forfeit Chapter 35 and Dependency and Indemnity Compensation (DIC) benefits from the United States Department of Veterans Affairs.

=== Through the foster care system ===
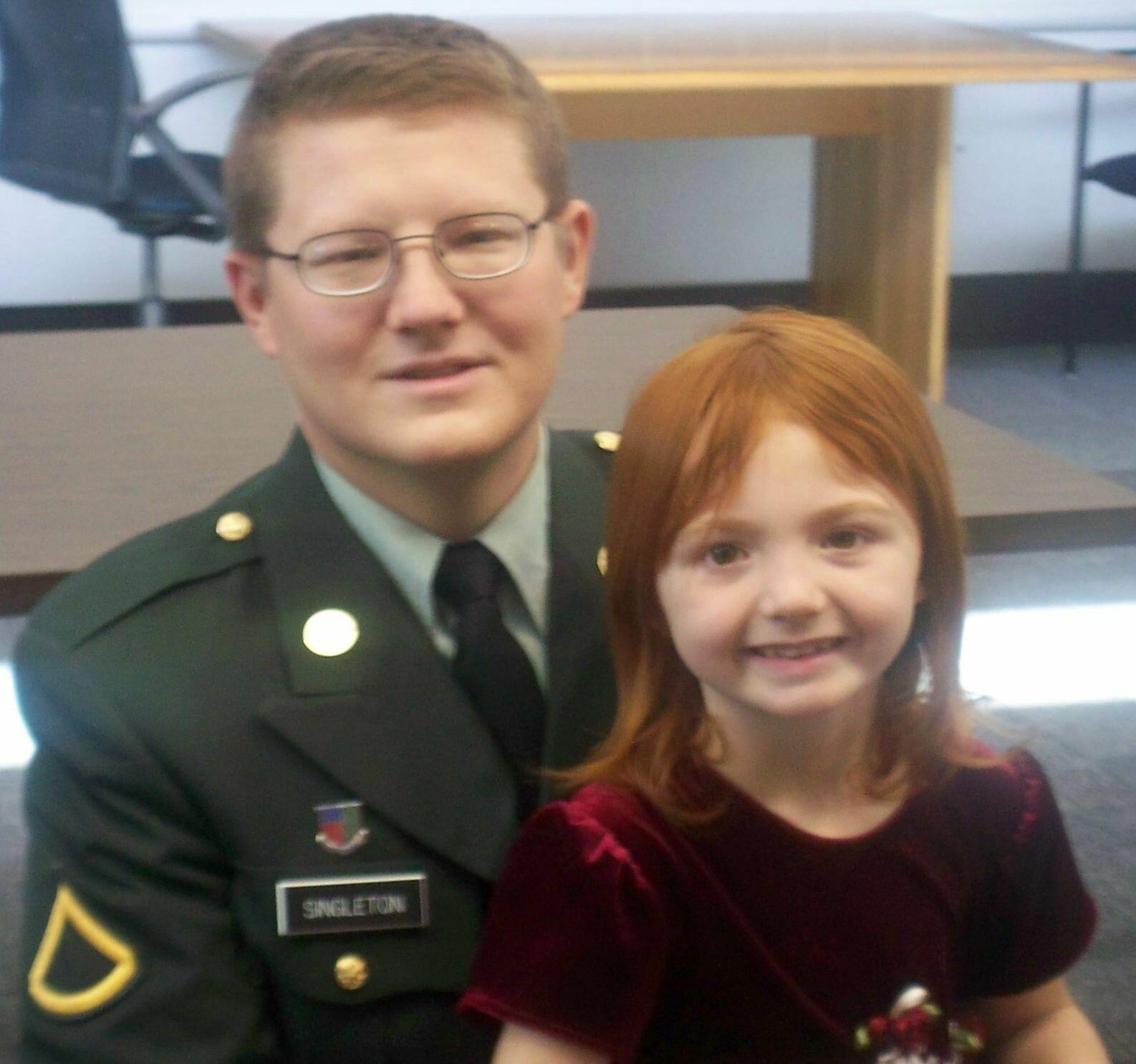
A young girl is adopted out of the foster care system

The United States foster care system enables adults to care for minor children who are not able to live with their biological parents.

If a child in a U.S. governmental foster care system is not adopted or returned to the custody of their birth parents by the age of 18 years, they may age out of the system, though a majority of U.S. states have extended foster care to age 21. To help encourage the adoption of children presently in foster care, adoption exchanges were created, so the county adoption agencies around the country could have a central data base to help waiting children find homes. This allows prospective adoptive parents to not only see children waiting for adoption in their own region, but throughout the nation. The central adoption exchange is adoptuskids.org, created through a grant of the Children's Bureau, U.S. Office of Administration of Children and Families.

=== International adoption ===
Prospective American adoptive parents may use international adoption (also called intercountry adoption) to adopt a child from another country. United States citizens, including U.S. citizens who have emigrated from countries they wish to adopt from, represent the majority of international adoptive parents, followed by Europeans and those from other developed nations, such as Australia. The laws of different countries vary in their willingness to allow international adoptions. Some countries, such as China, Korea and Vietnam, have very well established rules and procedures for prospective foreign adoptive parents to follow, while others, the United Arab Emirates (UAE) for example, expressly forbid it. International adoptions by U.S. citizens became much more common after the Korean War, when American servicemen fathered interracial children with Korean women. Korea has been the leading country for international adoptions by Americans, followed by China and Russia.

As of 2025, the U.S. Department of State designates two accrediting agencies responsible for accreditation, approval, monitoring, and oversight of adoption service providers that provide intercountry adoption services in the United States: the Intercountry Adoption Accreditation and Maintenance Entity, Inc. (IAAME) and the Center for Excellence in Adoption Services (CEAS). IAAME and CEAS each maintain a list of accredited intercountry adoption service providers.

== Number of adoptions ==
=== Recent numbers ===
As of 2021, fewer than one infant out of every 200 born each year are relinquished for adoption by the birth mother. In 2019, this amounted to approximately 18,000 independent adoptions. Independent adoptions are usually arranged by attorneys and typically involve infants. Approximately 55% of all U.S. infant adoptions are completed via independent adoption. Additionally, approximately 3,000 infants were adopted from outside the U.S. In 2024, the Washington Post estimated that between 1% and 3% of under-18s are adopted.

In non-voluntary relinquishments, at any given point in time, approximately 100,000 children are eligible for adoption through the foster care system. Nearly all of these children are school-age (age 5 to 17); younger children tend to be disabled or have siblings that should be adopted as a group. The enactment of the Adoption and Safe Families Act in 1997 has approximately doubled the number of children adopted from foster care in the United States.

The number of adults who would like to adopt a healthy infant or toddler significantly exceeds the number of infants available for adoption.

=== Historical numbers ===
Statistics from the 1940s and 1950s are unreliable, but researchers generally estimate that about 20% of the babies born to unmarried white American women were put up for adoption before the 1970s, and that this number declined steeply in the 1970s and 1980s. Black birth mothers were much less likely to be involved in adoption.

The 2000 census was the first census in which adoption statistics were collected. The estimated number of children adopted in the year 2000 was slightly over 128,000, bringing the total U.S. population of adopted children to 2,058,915. In 2008 the number of children adopted increased to nearly 136,000. (These numbers include adoption by step-parents and same-sex parents whose parental rights were not automatically recognized at birth.)

International adoptions became common in the 1950s, driven by the Korean War and much later by evangelical Christians.

=== International numbers ===
The highest number of international adoptions to the United States occurred in fiscal year 2004, and has declined to a small fraction of the peak since then.

Intercountry adoptions to the US by country and fiscal year
Country	1999	2004	2009	2014	2019	2023
China	4,108	7,038	3,000	2,040	819	16
Russia	4,381	5,862	1,586	2	0	0
Guatemala	1,002	3,264	754	29	0	0
South Korea	1,994	1,713	1,079	370	166	47
Ethiopia	42	284	2,275	716	11	0
Ukraine	321	794	610	521	298	10
Kazakhstan	77	835	295	0	0	0
Vietnam	709	21	481	0	32	20
India	472	406	297	136	241	221
Colombia	231	285	238	172	244	200
Other countries	2,382	2,486	2,117	2,440	1,160	761
Total	15,719	22,988	12,732	6,426	2,971	1,275

Children adopted from other countries are more likely to be female, largely due to the gender difference in adoptions from China.

International adoptions in the United States by country of birth 1999 − 2014 by sex:
Country	Female	Male	Total
China	64,903	8,769	73,672
Russia	22,891	23,222	46,113
Guatemala	15,725	14,065	29,790
South Korea	7,936	11,803	19,740
Ethiopia	7,461	7,339	14,800
Ukraine	5,070	5,173	10,243
Kazakhstan	3,475	2,946	6,421
Vietnam	3,321	2,256	5,578
India	3,818	1,575	5,393
Colombia	2,238	1,855	4,093
Other countries	21,435	18,854	40,289
Total	158,271	97,858	256,132

Source: U.S. Department of State, Bureau of Consular Affairs

== Organizations, agencies, and facilitators ==
Adoption agencies must be licensed by the state in which they operate. The U.S. government maintains a website, Child Welfare Information Gateway, which lists each state's licensed agencies. There are both private and public adoption agencies. Private adoption agencies often focus on infant adoptions, while public adoption agencies typically help find homes for waiting children, many of them presently in foster care and in need of a permanent loving home. To assist in the adoption of waiting children, there is a U.S. government-affiliated website, AdoptUSKids.org, assisting in sharing information about these children with potential adoptive parents. Families Rising, formerly known as North American Council on Adoptable Children, provides information on financial assistance to adoptive parents (called adoption subsidies) when adopting a child with special needs.

=== Adoption facilitators ===
Adoption facilitators are typically unregulated and unlicensed individuals who attempt to match children with prospective adoptive parents. In foreign countries they may provide services such as translation and transportation. Adoption facilitators are banned in a majority of U.S. states. In 2023, California became the 29th state in the U.S. to ban the use of adoption facilitators in adoptions.

== Social and psychological results ==
Because of changes in adoption over the last few decades – changes that include open adoption, gay adoption, international adoptions and trans-racial adoptions, and a focus on moving children out of the foster care system into adoptive families – adoption has had a large impact on the basic unit of society and the family. Joan Boocock Lee, an Episcopalian British-American actress married to a Jewish husband, stated that as members of an interfaith marriage the couple faced difficulty adopting in the mid-twentieth-century United States.

Some adoption research scholars have reported seven core issues to consistently be associated with the processes of adoption. Problems with loss, grief, rejection, guilt and shame, identity, intimacy, and control may, in some cases, uniquely affect each member of the adoption triad.

=== Trans-racial adoption ===
The adoption of children of one race by parents of another race, which began officially in the United States in 1948, has always generated controversy. The argument often comes down to opposing views as to who gets to decide what is the "best interest" of children. Critics of transracial adoption question whether white American parents can effectively prepare children of color to deal with racism. Others wonder where the children raised by white parents will find social acceptance as adults. Testimony from many transracially adopted adults who grew up in white families illustrates the "in-between" status many adoptees feel, not belonging to or feeling comfortable in communities of color or among white society. Another source of controversy is the history of the widespread removal of children from families and communities of color, which has been shown by historians to have been a tool to regulate families and oppress communities, dating back to slavery times and during the now-discredited Indian Boarding School movement of the early twentieth century. Given this history of child removal, the National Association of Black Social Workers (NABSW) condemned transracial adoptions in 1972 in their historic Position Statement. In that paper, the NABSW equated the removal of African American children from their families of origin—and their placement in white homes—with "cultural genocide."

Pro-transracial adoption advocates argue that there are more white families seeking to adopt than there are minority families; conversely, there are more minority children available for adoption. For example, in 2009, 41% of children available for adoption were African American, 40% were white children, and 15% were Hispanic children. This disparity often results in a lower cost to adopt children from ethnic minorities – usually through special adoption grants rather than fee discrimination. Many critics decry the exchange of money for children, whether as "fees for service" or otherwise, arguing that no children of any race should ever be for sale. Proponents point out practicality in the current systems. This situation is morally difficult because the adoptive families see adoption as a great benefit to trans-racially adopted children, while some minorities see it as an assault on their culture. In 2004, 26 percent of African-American children adopted from foster care were adopted trans-racially. Government agencies have varied over time in their willingness to facilitate trans-racial adoptions. "Since 1994, white prospective parents have filed, and largely won, more than two dozen discrimination lawsuits, according to state and federal court records." There is also a great need to place these children; in 2004 more than 45,000 African-American children were waiting to be adopted from foster care.

In 2013, 7,092 kids were adopted from foreign countries down from 22,991 in 2004. This trend has helped lower the resistance to trans-racial adoptions in the United States, at least for Asian and Hispanic children, although there is still high demand for Caucasian children, who usually come from Eastern Europe.

As the children adopted in the early days of the transracial adoption experiment have reached middle age, a growing chorus of voices from adult transracial adoptees has emerged. Their collective experience can be found in films, scholarly articles, memoirs, blogs, and numerous books on the subject.

=== Rehoming ===
While adoption is generally considered to be permanent, many jurisdictions allow adoptive parents to disrupt or dissolve adoptions, and recent news articles have shed light on the practice of rehoming adopted children, often via social media.This is the act of caregivers posting an advertisement when they do not want the child anymore. Investigation of the child's new housing situation is not required in this practice, and this has created an underground market, one where child traffickers can thrive. There is a lack of regulation surrounding this practice and current legislation contradicts each other, making this harder to combat.

Rehoming is not adoption and because of that, the government does not have to be notified and adoption agencies are not involved. Thus, re-homing is a prime target for child and sex traffickers. There are laws set in place to protect children through adoption processes and against sex trafficking, but there are barely any laws regarding rehoming. The courts authorize this practice because the U.S. state law may allow a parent, legal guardian or relative within the second degree to place out or board out a child. However, while the U.S. federal bill Preventing Sex Trafficking and Strengthening Families Act would require the family to make rational decisions and prioritize the health of the child, the Interstate Compact on the Placement of Children contradicts this. This states that the family only has to make sure children are placed in adequate care only when the re-homing process is done across state lines. There is no mention of maintaining the children's safety when rehoming within the same state.

The laws surrounding rehoming are basically non-existent which puts adopted children at the risk of unequipped parents and all other types of dysfunctional homes. This has led to negative effects that failed adoptions have on children as they go through the process of readapting to a new home environment again. With the statute that allows second-degree legal guardians to put their adopted child in the care of someone else, and the rising of re-homing websites and ads on social media, the rehoming process exposes children to underground markets and other trafficking prospects.

In 2018, the Uniform Law Commission formed a committee to study the rehoming issue, which is also known more formerly as "unregulated transfer of adopted children". The committee indicated that it will draft a uniform or model law to prohibit the unregulated transfer of all adopted children.

== Cost of adoption ==
=== Costs of private vs foster adoption ===
Adoption costs can range from $0 foster care adoptions to over $50,000 for international adoptions, with prices dependent on multiple factors, including the race, age, and health status of the infant. In 2015 the average U.S. adoption cost was $37,000. Some view infant adoption as a demand-driven market that drives up prices. Costs for adopting from foster care are much lower.

=== Source of costs ===
The cost of adoption varies widely based on the method of adoption. Almost all the different forms of adoptions have costs related to home study, documentation, adoption agency fees and profit, consultant fees, attorney fees, travel expenses. Adoption is a billion dollar business in the US, with many agencies operating for profit.

Public foster care adoptions frequently incur zero costs, though the U.S. average is $2,622 according to a 2015 survey done by Adoptive Families Magazine. Independently-arranged adoptions, orchestrated by a private attorney, can vary greatly in costs. The arrangements are generally set up between prospective adopters and an expecting mother. While some independent adoption arrangements may stay low cost due to the nature of the agreement, costs still average $31,890. Independently-arranged adoptions can reduce costs by staying in-state, sharing prenatal and child birth medical costs with the birth parents, finding a birth parent by word-of-mouth or by offer to avoid shopping for an adoption-willing parent. Private adoption agencies are the most expensive option, with an average cost of $42,337. Out-of-state adoptions can drastically increase adoption costs due to complex legal challenges and travels costs. Costs vary between states due to differing regulations and fees that can cause additional expenses. Medical costs are also frequently cited as an unexpected expense for both the birth mothers and the children. "False starts," when a mother decides not to give up their baby after it is born, can cost up to $2,500 each time.

==== International adoption costs ====
International adoptions can vary in cost, depending on the country, and average between $30,000 and $50,000. In some countries, costs can be equivalent to domestic adoption. According to Adoptive Families Magazine, Ethiopia to U.S. adoptions in 2015 averaged $30,633, while South Korea to U.S. adoptions averaged $40,000 to $50,000. Disparities in countries' adoption costs can be attributed by the differences in their regulation and requirements. Both Ethiopia and South Korea require two trips by prospective adopters, which increases overall costs. South Korea's advanced pre-adoption care and medical system costs can also increase costs passed down to adoptive parents. Due to the potential of challenging political and cultural climates of adoption origin countries, undisclosed costs such as "required donations," facilitating or origin country agency fees, and other extrajudicial pay-offs to the children's guardians, or origin country or for-profit adoption agency.

==== Physical characteristics as a cost factor ====
The physical characteristics of children being considered for adoption; such as race, age, and physical or developmental disability; can cause a 74% variation in adoption costs. Adopting parents may have a desire for specific characteristics in their adoptive child, for which they are willing to pay extra costs to obtain. In international adoptions, children with brown skin color cost $8,200 less to adopt, and dark skin color $14,700 less to adopt, compared to Caucasian children. In domestic adoptions, adoptions cost $600 less per every additional year of age. Additionally, African American children cost $4,400 less than their Caucasian counterparts to adopt. Children with physical disabilities cost $4,000 less.

=== Subsidies and tax credits ===
Adopters can claim most expenses through the adoption tax credit. For foster system adoptions, the adoption tax credit may cover the entire cost of adoption. Foster children may also qualify for monthly government stipends, Medicaid health insurance, and even college tuition.

== Adoption reform ==
Jean Paton, author of Breaking Silence and founder of Orphan Voyage in 1954, is regarded as one of the first adoptees to seek reform related to secrecy in adoption, particularly the sealing of adoption records and original pre-adoption birth records. Florence Fisher organized The ALMA Society (Adoptees' Liberation Movement Association) in 1972, Emma May Vilardi created International Soundex Reunion Registry (ISRR) in 1975, and Lee Campbell and other birthmothers joined the fight for Open Records forming Concerned United Birthparents (CUB) in 1976. By the spring of 1979 representatives of 32 organizations from 33 states, Canada and Mexico gathered together in DC to establish the American Adoption Congress (AAC). The Triadoption Library began keeping records in 1978 showing 52 search/support/reform organizations. By 1985, there were over 550 worldwide.

Adoption Reform encompasses family preservation, adoptees' access to original birth certificates, birth and adoptive families having direct access to each other (open adoption) and all related records (open records).

The Adoption Triangle by Annette Baran, Reuben Pannor and Arthur Sorosky; Twice Born and Lost and Found by Betty Jean Lifton; I Would Have Searched Forever by Sandra Musser; The Adoption Searchbook: Techniques for Tracing People by Mary Jo Rillera; The Politics of Adoption by Mary Kathleen Benet; Dear Birthmother by Kathleen Silber and Phylis Speedlin; all published in the 1970s and still in print, were instrumental in examining and defining the foundation of reform.

As of July 2014, 28 U.S. states and the District of Columbia have legal provisions for enforceable open adoption contact agreements, and an additional six states have provisions for enforceable agreements with some limitations. Each year additional states consider law changes that give persons separated by adoption access to information about themselves and each other. As of 2013, over 85% of adoptions in the US are either semi- or completely open.

== Search and reunion ==
Many adopted children who were separated from their birth parents by adoption have a desire to reunite, and most would like family medical history information and access to any documents where they are mentioned. Often, birth parents who placed their infants want to reunite as well. In states which practice or have practiced confidential adoption, this has led to the creation of adoption reunion registries, and efforts to establish the right of adoptees to access their sealed records (for example, the American Adoption Congress, Concerned United Birthparents, and Bastard Nation). Others join search and support groups, most of which are non-profit, or some hire investigative companies to locate birth families and adopted children.

== Related legislation ==
The Preventing Sex Trafficking and Strengthening Families Act (H.R. 4980; 113th Congress) passed the United States House of Representatives on July 23, 2014. It is a bill that would address federal adoption incentives and would amend the Social Security Act (SSA) to require the state plan for foster care and adoption assistance to demonstrate that the state agency has developed policies and procedures for identifying, documenting in agency records, and determining appropriate services with respect to, any child or youth over whom the state agency has responsibility for placement, care, or supervision who the state has reasonable cause to believe is, or is at risk of being, a victim of sex trafficking or a severe form of trafficking in persons. The bill H.R. 4980 passed the Senate on September 9, 2014, and President Obama signed it into law on September 29.

== See also ==
- Adoptee rights
- Adoption tax credit
- Adoption home study
- Korean adoptee
- Adoption in California
- Adoption in Connecticut
- American family structure
- Putative father registry
