= Scholarship tax credit =

In the United States, scholarship tax credits, also called tax credit scholarships, education tax credits or tuition tax credits, are a form of school choice that allows individuals or corporations to receive a tax credit from state taxes against donations made to non-profit organizations that grant private school scholarships. At the start of the 2014–2015 school year, fourteen states had scholarship tax credit programs.

== History ==
The first scholarship tax credit program was Arizona's Personal Tax Credits for School Tuition Organizations program, which has been in operation since 1997. In 2001, Florida created the second Scholarship Tax Credit program by enacting the Florida Tax Credit Scholarship Program.

== Legal challenges ==
On April 4, 2011, the Supreme Court of the United States upheld Arizona's Personal Tax Credits for School Tuition Organizations program in Arizona Christian School Tuition Organization v. Winn. The plaintiffs challenged that the use of tax credit scholarships to send children to religious schools violates the Establishment Clause. The district court originally dismissed the claim, but the Ninth Circuit court reversed the decision, ruling that the plaintiffs had standing to sue by citing Flast v. Cohen. The Supreme Court ruled 5-4 that the plaintiffs did not have standing to sue. Justice Kennedy, writing for the majority, explained that tax credits are not a form of government spending, and that donations to scholarship organizations are voluntary. As a result, no taxpayer is ever compelled to donate to such a program in violation of conscience and therefore no taxpayer can be harmed by the program. But plaintiffs must be able to demonstrate harm in order to have standing to sue, and so the case was dismissed for lack of standing and the scholarship program was upheld.

On March 12, 2009, Arizona's Corporate Tax Credits for School Tuition Organizations was upheld by the Arizona Court of Appeals in Green v. Garriott. The Arizona Supreme Court refused to hear the appeal.

== State tax credit program comparison ==
State	Program	Enacted	Credit Value	Means-Tested
Alabama	Alabama Accountability Act of 2013 Tax Credits for Contributions to Scholarship Granting Organizations	2013	100%	150% Median Household Income
Arizona	Personal Tax Credits for School Tuition Organizations	1997	100%	No
Arizona	Corporate Tax Credits for School Tuition Organizations	2006	100%	185% Free and Reduced Lunch federal eligibility guidelines
Arizona	Lexie's Law Corporate Tax Credits	2009	100%	No
Arizona	"Switcher" Individual Income Tax Credit Scholarship Program	2012	100%	No
Florida	Florida Tax Credit Scholarship Program	2001	100%	Free and Reduced Lunch federal eligibility guidelines
Georgia	Private School Tax Credit for Donations to Student Scholarship Organizations	2008	100%	No
Illinois	Empower Illinois	2017	100%	185% Poverty, or 300% Poverty for residents in Focus Districts
Iowa	School Tuition Organization Tax Credit	2006	65%	300% Poverty Limit
Indiana	School Scholarship Tax Credit	2010	50%	200% Free and Reduced Lunch federal eligibility guidelines
Kansas	Tax Credit for Low Income Students Scholarship Program	2014	70%	100% Free Lunch Program
Louisiana	Tax Credit for Donations to School Tuition Organizations	2012	100%	250% Poverty
New Hampshire	School Choice Scholarship Program	2012	85%	300% Poverty
Oklahoma	Oklahoma Equal Opportunity Education Scholarships	2011	50%	300% Free and Reduced Lunch federal eligibility guidelines
Pennsylvania	Educational Improvement Tax Credit	2001	75%/90%	$60,000 Household Income
Pennsylvania	Educational Opportunity Educational Opportunity Scholarship	2012	75%/90%	$60,000 Household Income
Rhode Island	Tax Credits for Contributions to Scholarship Granting Organizations	2006	75%/90%	250% Free and Reduced Lunch federal eligibility guidelines
South Carolina	Educational Credit for Exceptional Needs Children	2013	100%	Student must have a disability (as defined by South Carolina Department of Education)
Virginia	Educational Opportunity Scholarship Tax Credits	2012	65%	300% Poverty

As of September 2, 2014

== Special needs scholarships ==
Children raised in the foster care system of various states are not provided the funding for school choice. Recently many states have instituted voucher programs or scholarship programs allowing a foster family to choose a private school which is paid for with a scholarship or voucher. Special needs scholarships assist children in the foster care system as well as children with disabilities.

State	Program	Enacted	Value
Arizona	Empowerment Scholarship Accounts	2011	90%
Florida	John M McKay Scholarship	2011	100%
Georgia	Special Needs Scholarship	2007	100%
Louisiana	School Choice	2010	50%
Ohio	Autism Scholarship	2003	$20,000
Oklahoma	Scholarship for Students with Disabilities	2010	100%
Utah	Special Needs Scholarship	2005	100%

Other federal tax credits exist to help the special needs children including the adoption tax credit and the proposed Special Needs Tax Credit.
