= Intercountry Adoption Universal Accreditation Act of 2012 =

U.S. law on intercountry adoption accreditation

- Long title: An Act to amend the Intercountry Adoption Act of 2000 to provide for the application of the Hague Convention on Protection of Children and Co-operation in Respect of Intercountry Adoption to all adoptions involving foreign countries.
- Nicknames: Universal Accreditation Act
- Enacted by: the 112th United States Congress
- Effective: July 14, 2014

Citations
- Public law: Pub. L. 112–276 (text) (PDF)

Legislative history
- Introduced in the Senate as S.3331 on June 21, 2012; Passed the Senate on December 30, 2012; Passed the House on January 1, 2013; Signed into law by President Barack Obama on January 14, 2013

The Intercountry Adoption Universal Accreditation Act of 2012 (UAA) is a United States federal law that regulates adoption service providers involved in intercountry adoptions. It mandates universal accreditation standards for all such providers in the United States. It was signed into law on January 14, 2013, and took effect on July 14, 2014.

== Background ==
Prior to the UAA, the Intercountry Adoption Act of 2000 applied Hague Adoption Convention requirements only to adoptions into the US from countries that were parties to the Convention. Prior to the 2000 Act, providers were only regulated by state laws and state licensing authorities, with varying standards in each state.

== Provisions ==
The UAA extends Hague requirements to all intercountry adoptions, regardless of the child's country of origin. Key provisions include mandatory accreditation of all adoption service providers, as well as increased oversight and enforcement. The United States Department of State oversees compliance in collaboration with accrediting bodies. Accreditation may be suspended or revoked for noncompliance.

== Accrediting entities ==
Under the legislation, accrediting entities must carry out the accreditation, monitoring, and oversight of intercountry adoption service providers in the United States. The Intercountry Adoption Accreditation and Maintenance Entity (IAAME) and the Center for Excellence in Adoption Services (CEAS) are the two accrediting entities designated by the Department of State, which each have jurisdiction over different states.
