= Effects of adoption on the birth mother =

Effects of adoption on the birth mother* include stigma and other psychological effects a woman experiences when she places her child for adoption.

== Lead ==
The decision to relinquish* birth rights of a child is a heavy burden on the psychological makeup of a birth mother. Historically, it wasn't often the mother's decision. She would be subjected to intense pressure to relinquish*. A mother seldom 'gave up' her baby voluntarily. Babies were taken for adoption. This took place during the last half of the last century throughout the UK, in Ireland, Belgium, Holland, Portugal, Spain (particularly under Franco), the USA, Canada, New Zealand and Australia. Campaigners have worked tireless towards recognition of and apology for these injustices with varying results. There have been government apologies in Australia, Ireland and other nations such as Scotland and Wales, but many countries have failed to implement the redress and reparation measures needed to mitigate the lifelong impact on the mothers and on adult adoptees who were taken from their mothers in infancy. This is a human rights contravention that needs to be addressed. The impacts relate to Articles 4, 5, 6, and 10 of the European Convention on Human Rights. *The word relinquish does not really apply in this case. * The term 'birth mother' is one created by the adoption industry to ensure the mother becomes a side note and would not be considered pertinent to the life of the child she birthed after growing it in her body for nine months.

Reactions following relinquishment include psychological, physical, and social-interpersonal reactions. Birthmother Syndrome is a term that came about after a survey including 70 women who placed their children in adoption all were experiencing the same eight symptoms; signs of unresolved grief, symptoms of PTSD, diminished self-esteem, outward professions of perfection masking inner feelings of shame, arrested emotional development, self-punishment, unexplained secondary infertility, and living various extremes. She may feel a sense of loss for someone who is still alive or mourns the loss of her mothering role and may mourn for who her child may have become as her son or daughter. These feelings may resurface in later years, perhaps on the child's birthday or other important milestone in the child's life. Reports show that a birth mother feels grief when she has more children because this evokes the memory of the child she gave up. If she is faced with future infertility, she may believe it is a form of “punishment” for relinquishing her parenting rights over a child. Many birth mothers continue to mourn the loss of their child but with varying intensity.

It is not until a mother actually places her child for adoption that she experiences what Julie Axelrod believes is similar to the five stages of grief: denial, anger, bargaining, depression, and acceptance. Inspired by Elisabeth Kübler-Ross's On Death and Dying, the author attempts to show how those who have experienced the death of a loved one may be psychologically similar to a birth mother who has placed her child for adoption. The adoptive Families Association of British Columbia conducted a study where birth mothers completed a short questionnaire and a 40-minute recorded interview, the birth mothers in this study expressed a wide spectrum of feelings about their pregnancy and child relinquishment, ranging from happiness to debilitating depression.

== Psychological effects ==
The decision to relinquish birth rights of a child is a heavy burden on the psychological makeup of a birth mother. Reactions following relinquishment include psychological, physical, and social-inter personal reactions. Birthmother Syndrome is a term that came about after a survey including 70 women who placed their children in adoption all were experiencing the same eight symptoms; signs of unresolved grief, symptoms of PTSD, diminished self-esteem, outward professions of perfection masking inner feelings of shame, arrested emotional development, self-punishment, unexplained secondary infertility, and living various extremes. She may feel a sense of loss for someone who is still alive or mourns the loss of her mothering role and may mourn for who her child may have become as her son or daughter. These feelings may resurface in later years, perhaps on the child's birthday or other important milestone in the child's life. Reports show that a birth mother feels grief when she has more children because this evokes the memory of the child she gave up. If she is faced with future infertility, she may believe it is a form of “punishment” for relinquishing her parenting rights over a child.

Many birth mothers continue to mourn the loss of their child but with varying intensity. Unfortunately, there is so little research on this topic that much of what has been written here is conjecture, or at best an educated guess.

== Stages of grief ==
It is not until a mother actually places her child for adoption that she experiences what Julie Axelrod believes is similar to the five stages of grief: denial, anger, bargaining, depression, and acceptance. Inspired by Elisabeth Kübler-Ross's On Death and Dying, the author attempts to show how those who have experienced the death of a loved one may be psychologically similar to a birth mother who has placed her child for adoption. The Adoptive Families Association of British Columbia conducted a study where birth mothers completed a short questionnaire and a 40-minute recorded interview, The birth mothers in this study expressed a wide spectrum of feelings about their pregnancy and child relinquishment, ranging from happiness to debilitating depression as well as thoughts of self-harm and suicide ideation.

The following occurs in each stage:

=== Denial ===
The overwhelming emotions that a mother feels making her feel numb to the situation. In this stage, reality has not set in. When adoptive parents maintain a positive relationship with the birth mother increased empathy can be preserved and denial can be reduced.

=== Anger ===
This emotion is a manifestation of reality, the understanding of how devastating an impact the mother's decision has made on her and her understandable vulnerability. This may cause the mother to lash out to those closest to her. Some mothers report feeling as if their grief and loss were not considered legitimate, and were left alone to cope with the loss of their child. Additionally, mothers felt a lack of support

=== Anxiety ===
Mothers who continue to have contact with their child after the adoption report having feelings of anxiety and pressure. When having direct contact with their child the mothers hopes to make the experience memorable and special which can bring about these challenging feelings. Having inconsistent contact is another factor reported by mothers that invoke anxiety.

=== Guilt ===
Guilt was reported to be listed as one of a number of lasting impacts that effect birth mothers. Some mothers also reported that contact with their adult children and information would help them with their persistent feelings of guilt.

=== Bargaining ===
The mother begins to rethink the decision she has made. She feels the need to regain control of her emotional state by attempting to bargain with a religious or psychological figure to get rid of her sense of guilt. Birth parents may choose the adoptive parents based on whether they will allow continued communication with the child.

=== Acceptance ===
There is no real timetable as to when or whether a mother will ever be able to accept her decision, but at this stage, she begins to feel at peace with her decision. She still struggles with the reality of the adoption but understands and truly believes that she was acting for the child's well-being.

== Identity issues ==
Placing a child for adoption may also prompt identity issues in birth mothers. They may feel a desire to establish who the child will be in their lives and what role they will play in their lives. Birth mothers in open or mediated adoptions may be presented with more identity issues as they interact with the adoptive family. Placing a child for adoption does not mean a birth mother will never be able to contact the child. Adoption can include some communication between the birth mother and adoptive family. Both parties need to decide the level of openness for the adoption.

== Forming relationships post adoption ==
Some birth mothers may have difficulty forming and maintaining relationships post an adoption. This could be because of persisting feelings of loss and guilt, or due to the fear of becoming pregnant again and repeating the process. Some birth mothers may try to replace the loss quickly by beginning a new relationship, or giving birth again—without dealing with the grief of the adoption. For some birth mothers, the capacity to establish a successful long-term relationship may be conditional on the openness with which they can relate their past experiences of the adoption to their partner. The eventual acceptance of this loss does not mean that a birth mother has forgotten the child, but instead means that she has integrated the loss into her life.

== Exploitation of birth mothers ==
In underdeveloped nations, international adoption is commonly treated as a business where women and children are a commodity. This violates several standards and guidelines given by the United Nations. In many cases, reports from Argentina, Brazil, El Salvador, Guatemala, Honduras, Thailand, and other nations indicate that children have been placed for adoption after being purchased, indentured, or abducted from the birth mother. In one instance in Colombia, children were bought for $600 and sold for $10,000 with the use of illegal and falsified papers. In Honduras, it was found that to remedy inadequate prenatal care, many merchants pay teenage girls to get pregnant and monitor them to make sure they eat well and receive some kind of care. After the baby is born, $50 is paid to the birth mother in exchange for the healthy baby. While foreign adoptions provide several countries with much needed foreign currency, the exploitation of birth mothers raises several ethical and human rights issues. The lack of information on the circumstances involving the conception, birth, and the placement of a child poses a dilemma for women adopting internationally who have pro-choice views and yet quite possibly adopt from women who have little to no choice.

Typically these systems involve persons with the language and literacy skills, resources, and social positions to interact with first-world adoption agencies and prospective adoptive parents. These persons send out scouts or recruiters to target and take advantage of poor families and mothers. Birth mothers are often induced with false promises of money, continued contact with their child after adoption, or even immigration to a first-world nation. In instances such as this, many legitimate, licensed agencies in recipient countries such as the United States, Canada, and Europe, adopt through these illegal channels without their knowledge, thus contributing to the flow of funds and the illegal undertakings of child trafficking and the exploitation of birth mothers.

== See also ==
- International adoption
