= Pregnancy options clinic =

Pregnancy options clinic may refer to:

- Crisis pregnancy center, an establishment that counsels pregnant women against abortion
- Pregnancy options counseling, a non-directive form of counseling for pregnant women
