= Pregnancy options counseling =

Form of counseling and information

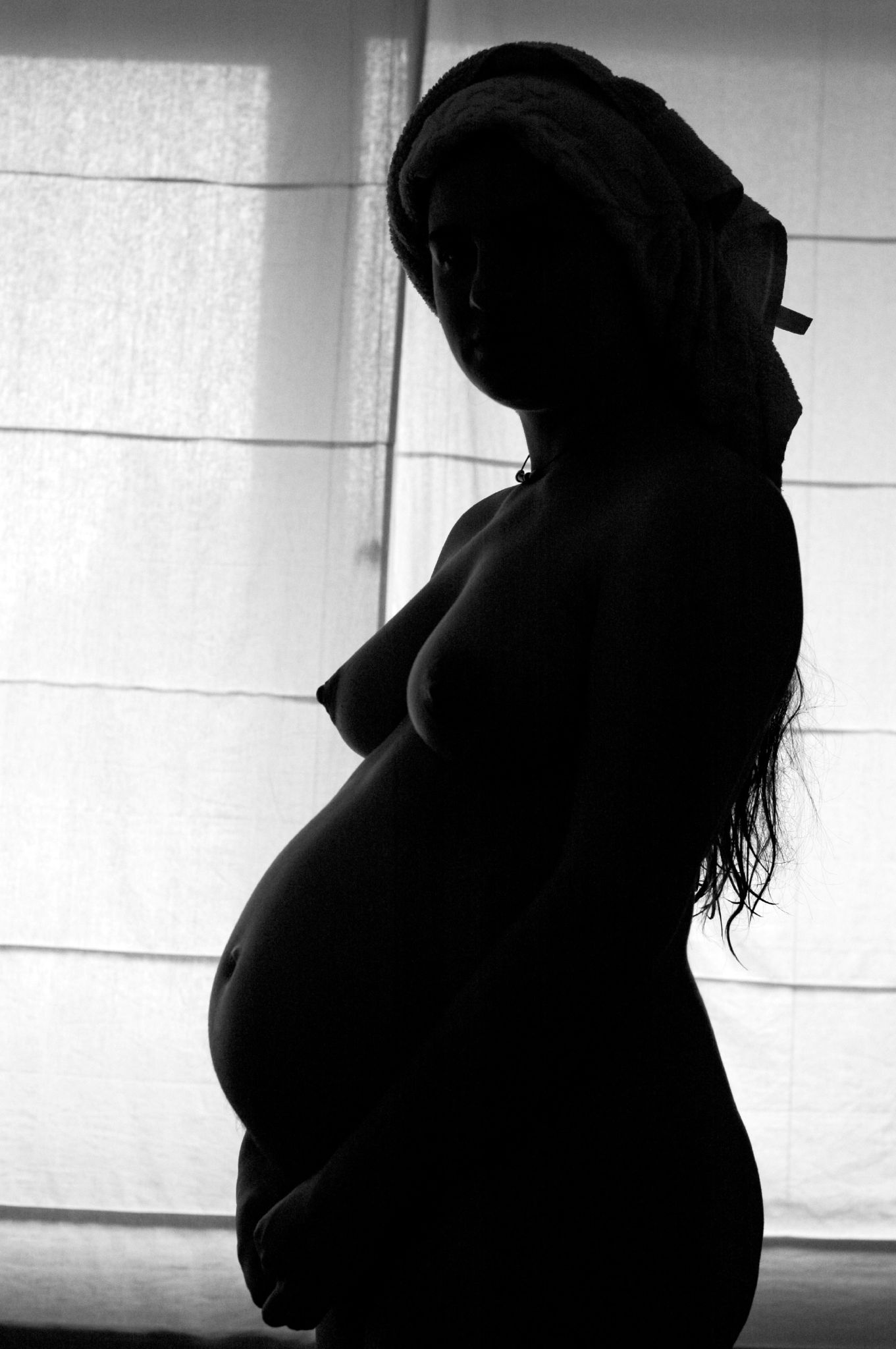

Pregnancy options counseling is a form of counseling that provides information and support regarding pregnancy. Women seeking pregnancy options counseling are typically doing so in the case of an unplanned or unintended pregnancy. Limited access to birth control and family planning resources, as well as misuse of birth control are some of the major contributing factors to unintended pregnancies around the world. In 2012, the global rate of unintended pregnancies was estimated to be 40 percent, or eighty-five million pregnancies.

Pregnancy options counselors educate women about the different options that are available and help guide them to a decision on how to proceed with their pregnancy. The options include abortion, adoption, or parenting. The job of a pregnancy options counselor is to neither encourage nor discourage a woman's particular decision, nor do they profit from the woman's choice. Rather, they present unbiased information about each of the options non-judgmentally, then help the woman explore her feelings and come to a decision that fits her best based on her values, culture, future plans, etc. Pregnancy options counseling centers differ from crisis pregnancy centers.

== Abortion ==
One option that a woman with an unplanned pregnancy may consider is abortion, the deliberate termination of a pregnancy. According to the World Health Organization (WHO), about 40–50 million abortions are performed worldwide each year. About 20 million of these abortions are considered unsafe and result in around 67,000 deaths each year. Abortion rates are similar across countries despite its being legal in some and illegal in others. In other words, just as many women get abortions in countries where it is illegal as in countries where it is legal. The only difference is that they proceed with illegal abortions, which are more likely to be provided under unsafe conditions by poorly trained providers. A woman's pregnancy options in regards to abortion would be presented differently by her counselor, depending on the country they are in. The Mexico City Policy is an example of governments restricting this aspect of pregnancy options counseling.

== Adoption ==
Adoption is a permanent, legal transfer of parental rights and responsibilities from child's birth parents to the adoptive parents. Pregnant women looking to place their child up for adoption might have options as to how much involvement they wish to have in choosing the adoptive parents, depending on the law in the jurisdiction where the adoption takes place. Some families may choose an open adoption, which can allow the birth parents contact through phone calls, letters, or live meetings. Despite the name, open adoptions are not always enforceable, depending on the jurisdiction - adoptive parents may withdraw consent to contact at any point. Others may choose a closed adoption, which does not allow the birth parents access to their child. Nonetheless, birthmothers choosing to put their child up for adoption are legally terminating their parental rights to the child. Adoption laws differ state by state; adoption agencies, counselors, and lawyers can be used to provide information to the birth parents and adoptive parents about this process.

== Choosing to parent ==
=== Prenatal care ===
If a pregnant woman seeking pregnancy options counseling is considering completing her pregnancy, whether it be in the case of adoption or that she is choosing to parent, her next step would be to start prenatal care, if available. Prenatal care is a type of preventative healthcare which serves to prevent potential health problems and promote a healthy lifestyle during the pregnancy.

== Mandatory counselling ==
Some countries, such as Germany, legally require pregnancy options counselling before obtaining an abortion.

== See also ==
- Abortion and mental health
- Crisis pregnancy center
- List of counseling topics
- Pregnancy options counseling in the United States
- Psychiatric disorders of childbirth
