= Home study =

Home study or homestudy may refer to:

- Adoption home study, an examination of prospective parents and their home prior to allowing them to adopt
- Home study course, distance learning
- Home study lesson, Rosicrucian Monographs
- Homeschooling
- "Home Study" Courses in Traffic school
