= Pregnancy options counseling in the United States =

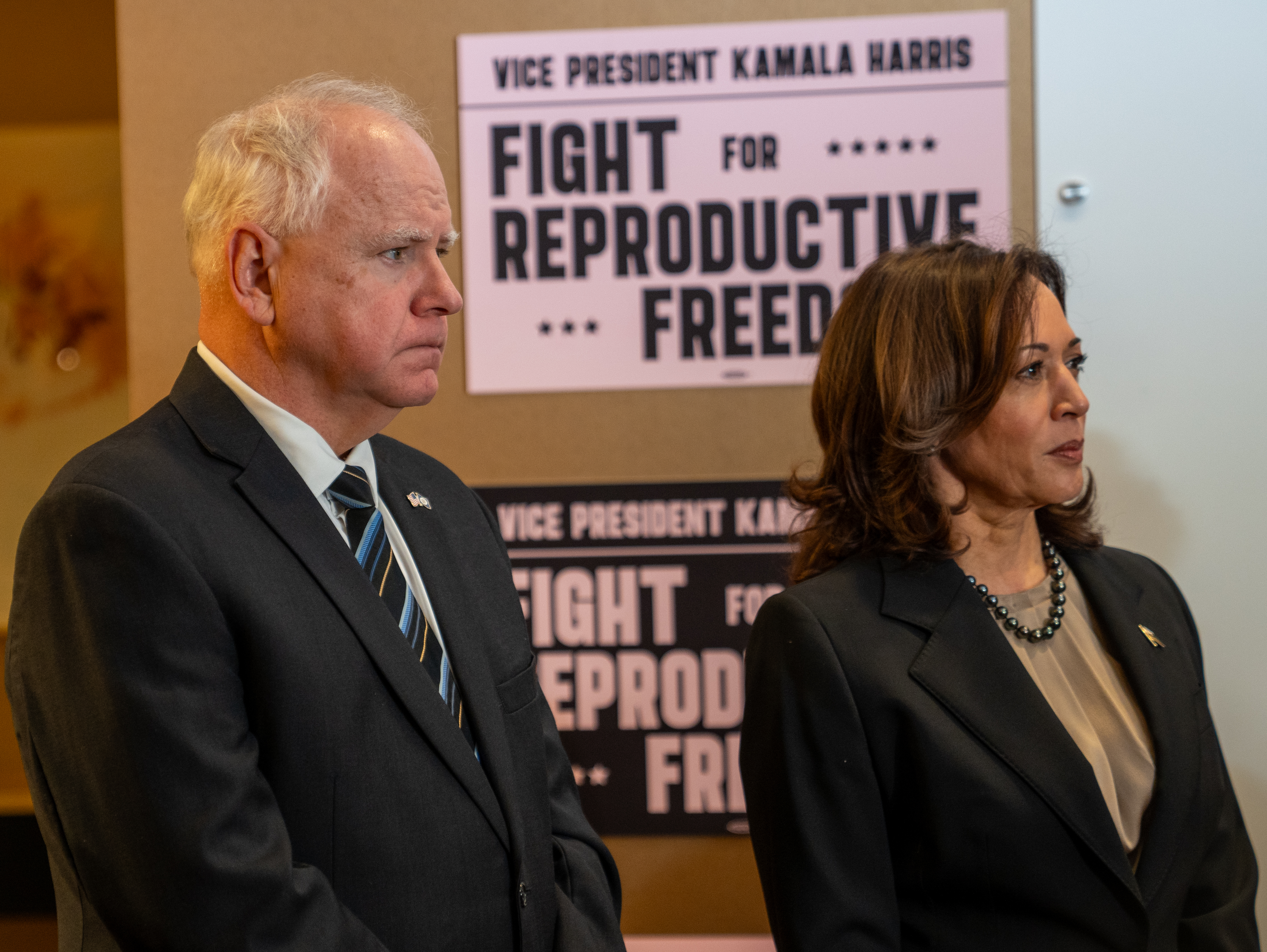
Vice President Harris and Governor Tim Walz visit an abortion clinic in Saint Paul, Minnesota on March 14, 2024

Pregnancy options counseling is a form of counseling aimed to counsel women on decision-making for a troubling or unintended pregnancy.

In the United States, approximately 51% of the six million annual pregnancies are unintended. A majority of the women affected by an unintended pregnancy are either 20–24 in age, poor or of low income, or are a member of a minority group. Unintended pregnancy rates are generally higher in the South and Southwest regions of the United States, in densely populated areas. A lack of family planning, limited access to birth control, or inconsistent use of birth control, are some of the contributing factors to unintended pregnancy. Other factors that lead to unintended pregnancy are birth control or contraception failure, rape or incest, unprotected sex, or unsuccessful vasectomy or tubal ligation.

Counselors may provide information on what services are available to help women decide how to handle their pregnancy. By taking into consideration a patient's present life circumstances, they aid them in making a decision about which option is best: this may include getting an abortion, giving the child up for adoption, or choose to parent the child as a single parent. Counselors give information in a non-biased manner, neither encouraging nor discouraging a particular decision for a woman to make.

== Abortion ==
=== Prevalence ===
Abortion is described as an intentional termination of a pregnancy. More than forty percent of women have an abortion during their reproductive cycle in their lives. In the United States, 3 out of 10 women have had an abortion by the time they are forty-five years old. Throughout the world, about 20-30 million legal abortions are performed each year, while another 10-20 million more are performed illegally. According to The World Health Organization, illegal abortions are unsafe and are responsible for 4.7–13.2% of maternal deaths in women.

=== Requirements and arguments ===
There are different requirements for women who wish to access abortion services. If someone is under eighteen, the person's state may require parental consent from one or both parents for the abortion to be carried out. In most states, it is possible to go to a judge and request to be excused from this requirement. The Supreme Court first legalized abortion in 1973 with the Roe vs. Wade decision.

When an abortion can be done depends on how far along an individual is in their pregnancy. Depending on that fact, the mother may have a choice between a medical abortion, which uses drugs to induce the abortion, or a surgical abortion. In a surgical abortion, the mother undergoes an operation to have the fetus and placenta removed. After nine weeks, a surgical abortion is typically the only option.

There are many controversial questions that arise when the issues of abortion are discussed in the political and social arenas. Some questions that are considered are: "Should spouses be notified before a woman has an abortion?", "Should public funds be used for abortions?", "Should the rules be different in cases of sexual assault and rape?" The issue of parental consent also surfaces. There are many pro and con arguments that arise when discussing whether abortion should be legal. Many supporters of legal abortion argue that the Supreme Court has declared abortion to be "a fundamental right guaranteed by the constitution.” They also argue that allowing women to get abortions gives them control over their own bodies. In general, individuals who believe abortion should be illegal disagree. First and foremost, they believe that abortion is murder. They believe that life begins at conception. These are only a few of the many important arguments that both supporters and non-supporters voice regarding abortions.

== Adoption ==
=== Types of adoption ===
There are two types of adoption to choose from: closed adoption and open adoption. Closed adoptions occur when the birthmother and the family adopting do not receive any information about one another, which typically happens when the birthmother wants to remain anonymous. Open adoptions occur when the birth mother and the adoptive parents do have some form of contact. In this situation, the birthmother usually selects the family based on their values, lifestyle, and religion. Sometimes the birthmother and adoptive parents will have some type of relationship, which might include visits with the child, phone calls, or pictures to update the birthmother. Birthmothers might choose this option when they want to be updated as the child grows up.

=== Adoption laws ===
Whether open or closed adoption is chosen, adoption is legal and binding. Every adoption must be approved by a judge in a court of law. The adoption laws differ in each state, and adoption agencies, counselors, or lawyers can give information on the laws in each state. After the baby is born, the birth mother must sign papers to terminate her rights as the parent of the child. Laws about the birth father's consent also vary from state to state.

== Choosing to parent ==
=== Prenatal care ===
When an unplanned pregnancy occurs, women are usually placed in a difficult position - as such, it is recommended they should write down thoughts, feelings, and fears about their pregnancy options to help with their decision. If the woman decides to parent the child herself, her first step is to start prenatal care. This will ensure she and the baby stay in good health. Prenatal care refers to the care that a woman receives from a health care provider, such as a doctor or midwife, during pregnancy. During the first prenatal care visit, the mother will have a full physical examination as well as a gynecological exam. Typically, for a healthy patient between the ages of 18 and 35, the expectant mother will see her doctor every four to six weeks for the first 32 weeks (8 months); from weeks 32 to 37, every two to three weeks; and from week 37 until delivery, every week.

=== Lifestyle changes ===
If the mother chooses to parent, doctors often encourage mothers to make positive lifestyle choices in order to prevent health problems with the unborn baby. This often includes avoiding the consumption of caffeine, alcohol, cigarettes, marijuana, other recreational drugs, some prescribed medications, and some over-the-counter remedies. The mother is also usually encouraged to maintain a healthy diet and to exercise regularly. More than 97 to 98% of babies are born healthy.

=== Monetary assistance ===
The U.S. Department of Health and Human Services has a program called Maternal and Child Health Bureau that coordinates medical care, support, and advice for pregnant women as well as information about health insurance. The mission of the Maternal and Child Health Bureau is to provide leadership to improve the physical and mental health, safety, and well-being of the maternal and child health population, which includes all of the nation's women, infants, children, adolescents, and their families. Medicaid and Children's Health Insurance Program are two assistance programs that aid with paying for prenatal care.
