= Uma Feed =

Norwegian-Korean artist, actor and activist

- Born: Um Sul-yung; 1982 (age 43–44); Seoul, South Korea
- Known for: Video and performance art criticising intercountry adoption
- Style: Video, performance
- Awards: Zola Prize (2024)

Uma Feed (born in 1982 in Seoul) is a Norwegian and South Korean actor, artist and activist. She is known for visual art and performance art about her experience as an adoptee from South Korea growing in Norway, and has been a prominent critical voice in public debate about intercountry adoption in Norway. In 2025 she sued the Norwegian state for human trafficking.

== Biography ==
Uma Feed was born in 1982 in Seoul. Her grandparents put her up for adoption against her parents' wishes when she was newborn, and she was sent to Norway when she was six months old, and adopted by Gro Karin and Gunnar Field. She grew up with them in Forus, a suburb of Stavanger. Feed has a BA in method acting from NSKI University College in Oslo.

== Artistic career ==
Her video artwork 유일한 이야기 The Only Story was shown in Oslo's annual autumn art exhibition Høstutstillingen in 2019, and is also presented on the National Museum of Norway's website. It is frequently shown and discussed in high schools, and NDLA has a lesson plan for teaching using the film.

In Feed's performance piece Ekko she references her childhood performances at the church her adoptive father taught Sunday school at, where she danced with a big smile on her face. In the performance, she wears a paper birthday hat, a clownish smile is painted on with lipstick, and her mouth is unsmiling.

In 2024 Fritt Ord gave financial support to a documentary about Uma Feed, to be directed by Silje Evensmo Jacobsen.

Feed has had minor roles in TV series including Føkkings Fladseth (2023), Handle with care (2017). She was a set costumer in Exit (2019).

== Activism against intercountry adoption ==
In 2024, she won the Zola Prize for civilian courage for her public activism and work over many years to shed light on the situation for Norwegian adoptees from other countries. In 2025, Uma Feed sued the state of Norway for human trafficking and being aware of the falsification of documents by allowing her to be adopted by Norwegian parents without her biological parents' permission. The legal action came after Feed had spent several years raising public awareness of the problems of intercountry adoption in Norwegian media and through her artwork. She was a spokesperson for the Norwegian Korean Rights Group (Norsk koreansk rettighetsgruppe) and has called for a national ban on intercountry adoptions, and mental health support for adoptees.

== Works ==
- 유일한 이야기 The Only Story (video, 2019)
- Ekko
