= National Advisory Committee on the Sex Trafficking of Children & Youth in the United States =

American government agency

Agency overview
- Formed: January 18, 2019; 6 years ago
- Headquarters: Washington, D.C.
- Employees: 8+
- Agency executive: J.R. Ujifusa, Chair

The National Advisory Committee on the Sex Trafficking of Children & Youth in the United States is a U.S. federal government committee created by the Preventing Sex Trafficking and Strengthening Families Act.

The committee advises on policies concerning improvements to the United States' response to the sex trafficking of children and youth.
