= Adoption in Connecticut =

Overview of adoption in the U.S. state of Connecticut

Adoption in Connecticut means "the establishment by court order of the legal relationship of parent and child." Adoption is provided for in Title 45a of the Connecticut General Statutes. The provisions of this title, with a few exceptions are to be "liberally construed in the best interests of any child for whom a petition [for adoption] has been filed under said sections." Fundamentally, adoption is a two-step process: (1) an agreement to give and receive the child in adoption and (2) approval of said agreement by the probate court.

== Adoption and foster care ==
Foster care in Connecticut is the placement of children with families that have been licensed by the Department of Children and Families (DCF) for long-term care. A "child in foster care", or foster child, means a child residing with an adult who is approved by DCF to stand in loco parentis for the child and on whose behalf foster care payments are being made by DCF. There are currently approximately 6,400 children in foster care in Connecticut. These children live in variety of custodial arrangements: foster care, group homes, (Note: A "group home" is a non-secure home licensed by DCF for children.) independent living, medical care, (Note: "Medical care" refers to those children living in short-term residential programs "cooling off" from a particular crisis.) relative care, residential facility, "SAFE" homes (Note: "SAFE" homes are temporary homes used by DCF to place children traumatized by abuse and neglect. Children may spend up to 45 days there while DCF assesses their needs and searches for appropriate placement.) and shelters. Most children in foster care are not available for adoption. At any given time there are between 150 and 170 children, within the foster care system, who are ready for adoption.

=== Placement of foster children ===
DCF must take reasonable efforts to reunify parents and children unless a court has decreed otherwise.

== The changing nature of adoption ==
Traditionally, adoption could not proceed unless the parental rights of both parents were first terminated. However, this is no longer always the case. In some instances, birth parents and legal parents have entered into an open adoption agreement, also known as "cooperative postadoption agreements." Either or both birth parents and an intended adoptive parent may enter into a cooperative postadoption agreement regarding communication or contact between either or both birth parents and the adopted child. Such an agreement may be entered into if:

(1) The child is in the custody of the Department of Children and Families; (2) an order terminating parental rights has not yet been entered; and (3) either or both birth parents agree to a voluntary termination of parental rights, including an agreement in a case which began as an involuntary termination of parental rights. The postadoption agreement shall be applicable only to a birth parent who is a party to the agreement. Such agreement shall be in addition to those under common law. Counsel for the child and any guardian ad litem for the child may be heard on the proposed cooperative postadoption agreement. There shall be no presumption of communication or contact between the birth parents and an intended adoptive parent in the absence of a cooperative postadoption agreement.

In Michaud v. Wawrack, the Court held that an agreement between birth mother and adoptive parents, that was not part of the adoption decree, is enforceable, provided it was in the best interests of the child. The terms of a cooperative postadoption agreement may include the following: "(1) Provision for communication between the child and either or both birth parents; (2) provision for future contact between either or both birth parents and the child or an adoptive parent; and (3) maintenance of medical history of either or both birth parents who are a party to the agreement."
