= Cultural variations in adoption =

There are several notable cultural variations in adoption. Adoption is an arrangement by which an orphaned child or one whose biological parents are unable to care for them is "adopted". While all societies make provision for the rearing of children whose own parents are unavailable to care for them, cultures and legal systems treat an adopted child in different ways ranging from equivalent status to legitimate biological children to guardianship.

There are variations regarding inheritance of property and rank, for example, under a system of adoption, if a parent dies intestate, the adopted child stands in exactly the same position regarding inheritance as a biological child. Inheritance of rank varies across jurisdictions and time periods, in pre-modern Japan, a child could inherit the parent's aristocratic title or samurai rank, whereas in the United Kingdom (which only introduced legal adoption in 1926), only a biological child could inherit an aristocratic title, even if raising or providing for parentless children was a common practice.

== Arab ==
In Arab cultures, if a child is adopted, he or she traditionally does not become a "son" or "daughter", but rather a ward of the adopting caretaker(s). The child's surname is not changed to that of the adopting parent(s), who are publicly recognised as "guardians", making it close to other nations' systems for foster care. Other common rules governing adoption in Islamic culture address inheritance, marriage regulations, and the fact that adoptive parents are considered trustees of another individual's child rather than the child's new parents. In addition, Islamic countries such as Iraq and Malaysia have prohibitions against a child of Muslim parents being adopted by non-Muslim individuals.

== Jewish ==
Judaism contrasts to Roman law, in that the adoptive parents do not entirely replace the role of the biological parents. An adoption procedure was never introduced in Jewish Law. In Judaism, genealogy determines the status of the child, which cannot be removed by a legal procedure.

== Korea ==
In traditional Korean culture, adoption almost always occurred when another family member (sibling or cousin) gives a male child to the first-born male heir of the family. Adoptions outside the family were rare. This has also been the reason why most orphaned Korean children have been exported to countries such as the United States. This is also true to varying degrees in other Asian societies. To this day orphanages are still common all over South Korea.

== Africa ==
On the other hand, in many African cultures, children are often given to adoptive families. By giving their child to another family, the birth family seeks to create enduring ties with the adoptive family. The placing family may receive another child from that family, or from another. In the same way as giving their child for adoption, the exchange of female relatives from one family to another, for marriage, is meant to create enduring connections and social solidarity among families and lineages. Among the Mbuti people, sister exchange is the common form of marriage.

== India ==
There is no uniform adoption law in India; however, this statement could be debated. The Hindu Adoption and Maintenance Act of 1956 allows only Hindus, Sikhs, Jains, and Buddhists to adopt. Muslims, Christians, Jews and Parsees can become only guardians under the Guardians and Wards Act of 1890. Guardianship expires once the child attains the age of 18 years. For children adopted outside India, guardianship is awarded with the expectation that the child will be quickly adopted by the adopted parents in the country where they legally reside. The Indian government regulates domestic and inter-country adoption of children in India.

== Pacific ==
"Fluid adoption" is common in Pacific culture, and rarely are ties to the biological family severed, as traditionally has occurred in Western adoptions. Many Europeans and Americans associate adoption as a solution to something gone wrong, e.g. unwanted pregnancy (by genetic parent) or infertility (by adoptive parent). By contrast, most of the Pacific cultures, for example in Sikaiana in the Solomon Islands, prefer that children move between different households. Fosterage is viewed as a way to create and maintain close personal relations, and parents traditionally do not refuse to let others take their children. These transfers of children between different caretakers and households are not exclusive, and they do not permanently separate the children from their biological parents.

New Zealand Māori have a form of traditional adoption practised within extended family called whāngai (Māori, "to feed"). Ties to the biological family are not normally severed.

Kiribati culture also practice this fluid adoption, called "tibu".

Tahitians practice faʼaʼamu (literally "giving to eat") adoption. Its basic functions are comparable to the ones of other traditional adoption practices, notably in Africa; a child can be "given" with the agreement or on the initiative of the family council for a variety of reasons, and they can even be asked for and given before birth.

=== Tikopia ===
Traditional Tikopia (Solomon Islands) society did not practice adoption as it is traditionally understood in Western societies. It was not uncommon for families to rear children left parentless, and childless adults would sometimes take the child of another family and bring it up. The children, however, retained the tribal affiliation of their biological fathers, and inherited land only from the property of the paternal lineage, not from the property of the lineage of the guardian.
