= Whāngai adoption =

Māori traditional system in New Zealand

Whāngai adoption, often referred to simply as whāngai (literally, "to nourish"), is a traditional method of open adoption among the Māori people of New Zealand.

Whāngai is a community process rather than a legal process, and usually involves a child being brought up by a close relative, either because his or her parents have died or because they are unable to look after the child. The adoptive parent is known as a matua whāngai, and the child is called a tamaiti whāngai. The child knows both its birth and whāngai parents, and the local community and extended whānau is usually closely involved in the decision to adopt and in helping with the child's development. Whāngai may be temporary or permanent.

The whāngai system developed before the development of New Zealand's current legal rules on adoption and fostering and operates parallel with it, but is recognised by New Zealand law. It does not follow the strictures of the Adoption Act of 1955, for example, which supported the idea of a complete break between birth and adoptive families. The whāngai system is still in use in more traditional Māori communities. Te Ture Whenua Māori Act 1993 provided a firmer legal basis for the practice, particularly in regards to inheritance law, and formalised whāngai as tikanga Māori (Māori customary practice). There are still some restrictions within the law regarding the rights of whāngai children which differ from those of legally adopted children. For instance, a child of a whāngai adoption cannot challenge a will under the Family Protection Act.

Several well-known Māori have been brought up as tamaiti whāngai, among them opera singer Inia Te Wiata, comedian Billy T. James, senior public servant Wira Gardiner, netballer Joline Henry, and former Governor-General of New Zealand Jerry Mateparae.

The 2018 documentary Sharing the Love by Rochelle Umaga explores whāngai in modern New Zealand.

== See also ==
- Cultural variations in adoption
