= Special Needs Tax Credit =

Addition to U.S. tax code

Special Needs Tax Credit is a proposed addition to the U.S. Internal Revenue Service tax code, which would enable a $5,000 refundable tax credit to reimburse family members of adults with special needs and seniors with dementia for the legal expenses of guardianship for their loved ones. It would also enable the creation of a Special needs trust for a person with disabilities. The proposal, initiated by Jaret L. Vogel in 2006, became draft legislation in 2009, and the "Special Needs Tax Credit" Bill was put before the United States Congress in March 2011.

== Special Needs Adoption Tax Credit ==
The Adoption tax credit has provided tax credits continuously since 1997. Special needs adoptions qualify for the maximum tax credit even if no qualified adoption expenses are incurred. Section 36C of the United States Internal Revenue code offers a credit for "qualified adoption expenses" paid or incurred by individual taxpayers.

== Other special needs tax benefits ==
A disabled individual can be claimed as a dependent on the tax return of a family member. There is no age limit on claiming the disabled individual as an exemption due to the disability. Head of household status and earned income tax credits are also possible benefits depending on the taxpayers situation. Medical expenses are also possible itemized deductions available to the taxpayer.
