= Hague Adoption Convention =

International convention

Hague Convention on Protection of Children and Co-operation in Respect of Intercountry Adoption
- Parties to the convention: ratifier; ratifier, as non-member state of the organization; signatory only; no data
- Drafted: 29 May 1993
- Location: The Hague, Netherlands
- Effective: 1 May 1995
- Condition: 3 ratifications
- Ratifiers: 101
- Depositary: Ministry of Foreign Affairs of the Kingdom of the Netherlands
- Languages: French and English

The Hague Convention on Protection of Children and Co-operation in Respect of Intercountry Adoption (or Hague Adoption Convention) is an international convention dealing with international adoption, child laundering, and child trafficking in an effort to protect those involved from the corruption, abuses, and exploitation which sometimes accompanies international adoption. The convention has been considered crucial because it provides a formal international and intergovernmental recognition of intercountry adoption to ensure that adoptions under the convention will generally be recognized and given effect in other party countries.

== Objectives ==
The preamble to the Convention states:

Intercountry adoptions shall be made in the best interests of the child and with respect for his or her fundamental rights and to prevent the abduction [sic. should be "abduction of"], the sale of, or traffic in children and each State should take, as a matter of priority, appropriate measures to enable the child to remain in the care of his or her family of origin.

The main objectives of the convention, are set out in Article 1:

- to establish safeguards to ensure that intercountry adoptions take place in the best interests of the child and with respect for his or her fundamental rights as recognized in international law,
- to establish a system of co-operation amongst Contracting States to ensure that those safeguards are respected and thereby prevent the abduction, the sale of, or traffic in children,
- to secure the recognition in Contracting States of adoptions made in accordance with the convention.

== History ==
The convention was developed by the Hague Conference on Private International Law, the preeminent organization in the area of private international law. It was concluded on 29 May 1993 and entered into force on 1 May 1995. As of March 2019, the convention has been ratified by 99 states. South Korea, Nepal, and Russia have signed but not ratified it. Many countries which have not ratified the Convention do not permit foreign adoptions of their children nor adoptions of foreign children.

In 2017 the subject was in the headlines as Madonna applied to adopt twin girls from Malawi. Justice Fiona Mwale approved the adoption, but after the case was settled she advised that Malawi should adopt the Hague Convention on Inter-country Adoption, to address the issue of "foreigners fly[ing] in to adopt a child".

== Policies and procedures ==
With respect to the previous multilateral instruments which include some provisions regarding intercountry adoption, the Hague Adoption Convention is the major multilateral instrument regulating international adoption and calls for the need for co-ordination and direct co-operation between countries to ensure that appropriate safeguards are respected.

The Hague Adoption Convention has several requirements. The adoption process includes establishing a "Central Authority" to serve as the country's primary contact in adoption processes; satisfying several checks for a child eligible for adoption, including verifying the propriety of the adoption under the laws of both countries; making a reasonable prior effort to facilitate a domestic adoption; and agreeing to use only certified adoption agencies.

Article III outlines the responsibilities that the entire process must be authorized by central adoption authorities designated by the contracting states. If fully implemented at the national level, the convention offers a protective framework against the potential risks of private adoption (when the adoptive parents set the terms of the adoption directly with the biological parents or with children's institutions placed in the country of origin, without recurring to accredited adoption service providers).

The Implementation and Operation of the 1993 Intercountry Adoption Convention: Guide to Good Practice, prepared by HCCH, provides assistance to the operation, use and interpretation of the convention.

== Compliance ==
To comply with international standards, many changes have been introduced in national legislation enacting laws to criminalize the act of obtaining improper gains from international adoptions. However, instances of trafficking in and sale of children for the purpose of adoption continue to take place in many parts of the world. In the fiscal year of 2006, the Department of State Office of Children's Issues assisted in the return to the United States of 260 children who had been abducted to or wrongfully retained from other countries and 171 children were returned from countries that are Convention partners with the United States. This statistic, though accurate and interesting, refers to returns of wrongfully retained children under the 1980 Hague Convention (on Abduction) and is not relevant to the 1993 Hague Convention (on Adoption). Especially during emergency situations, natural disasters or conflicts, children are observed to be adopted without strict legal procedures being followed, with a risk that there may be cases of child trafficking. An excessive bureaucratization of the adoption process after the implementation of the Hague Adoption Convention has been noted to establishing possible additional barriers to the placement of children.

== See also ==
- US Interstate Compact on the Placement of Children
- US Uniform Child Custody Jurisdiction and Enforcement Act
