= Putative father registry =

Legal option for fathers to retain child parental rights

In the United States of America, the putative father registry is a state level legal option for unmarried men to document through a notary public any woman they engage with in intercourse, for the purpose of retaining parental rights for any child they may father.

== About ==
In the United States, putative fathers will be notified when actions to terminate their parental rights as part of adoption proceedings are filed for a child they may have fathered and registered for. Non-marital fathers are not guaranteed notice of an adoption or any rights in contesting the decision by the mother, nor are they guaranteed the ability to adopt or gain custody of the child. This has generated controversy, due to the fact that unwed fathers are held responsible financially for the children they father inside or outside of marriage, with the same financial responsibilities any married father would be held to. However, the unmarried fathers have no right to custody, visitation, or to oppose the adoption of their children, only the obligation to support them financially (and the penalty of prison time if they fail to do this). Typically, the father is only guaranteed notification and the right to appear in court to testify about their child's best interests when he has registered timely. Registering timely with a state's putative father registry supposedly guarantees notice, though there have been documented instances where that wasn’t true. Timely legal establishment of paternity typically guarantees notice and an opportunity to be heard and may confer rights to consent or withhold consent to adoption. Prenatal support of the mother and fetus assures recognition of parental rights in 34 states.

There is no federal law in place regulating putative father registries. Currently 33 states in the U.S. have putative father registries. The number of children adopted without consent or notice to the biological father under the registry program started in the 1970s is unknown.

State putative father registries are intended to protect the non-marital father from fraud by providing him with legal notice of a planned adoption of a child, provided he registers within a limited time-frame (usually any time prior to the birth, or from 1 to 31 days after a birth). Lack of knowledge of the pregnancy or birth is not an acceptable reason for failure to file; fraud by the birth mother typically does extend the father's time to register.

Some states require a putative father to file with multiple states, i.e. with the state possible conception might have occurred, state of residence (if different) and possible states the mother might visit, or relocate to after the possible conception date that also have putative father registries. At least one state requires a parent or guardian of the declarant to also sign when a minor under the age of 18 is documenting intercourse with a putative father registry.

17 states (Alaska, California, Colorado, Connecticut, Hawaii, Kentucky, Maine, Maryland, Mississippi, Nevada, New Jersey, North Carolina, North Dakota, Rhode Island, South Dakota, Washington, West Virginia), as well as American Samoa, District of Columbia, Guam, Northern Mariana Islands, Puerto Rico, and the Virgin Islands, do not have putative father registries.

== Alternative names ==
Putative father registries are not always called such by individual states. Other names for registries include:

- Paternity registry
- Centralized paternity registry
- Interstate adoption putative father registry
- Parental claim registrar
- Fathers' adoption registry
- Biological father registry
- Putative father inclusion
- Responsible father registry

== See also ==
- Adoption
- Adoption in the United States
- Fathers' rights movement
- Fathers' rights movement in the United States
- Men's rights
- Paternity fraud
- Putative father
- Reproductive rights

== U.S. state external links ==
20 states with a putative father registry and registration forms publicly posted online:

- Alabama - The link on the Alabama Department of Human Resources website says "Putative Father Registry Form," but the actual form is called "Alabama Department of Human Resources Putative Father Intent to Claim Paternity Registration." Along with this form the state's website also notes that a putative father must also file a child support obligation statement with it for the registration to be valid. This link on the website says "Putative Father Income Statement," but the actual form is called "Child-Support-Obligation Income Statement/Affidavit." Alabama Putative Father Registry - Alabama Putative Father Registry Form - Putative Father Income Statement
- Arizona - The link and the registry form on the Arizona Department of Health Services are both called "Notice of Claim of Paternity." Section (2F) notes, "Lack of knowledge of the pregnancy is not an acceptable reason for failure to file." Arizona Department of Health Services - Arizona Putative Father Registry Form
- Arkansas - The Arkansas Department of Health has a brief description of its Putative Father Registry and an online form also called a "Putative Father Registry Form." Arkansas Department of Health - Arkansas Putative Father Registry Form - University of Arkansas.edu PFR information
- Florida - The form linked to at the Florida Department of Health's website is called "Florida Putative Father Registry Claim of Paternity," and is available in English, Spanish and Creole. The form notes, "A Claim of Paternity may be filed any time prior to the birth BUT a claim of paternity may not be filed after the date a petition is filed for termination of parental rights." Florida Putative Father Registry - Putative Father Registry Form
- Georgia - The Georgia Department of Health, Vital Records, Putative Father Registry website has information links along with a form called "Putative Father Registry - Registration Form State of Georgia." Both the website and the form note registration "indicates the possibility of paternity without acknowledging paternity of the child." Georgia Putative Father Registry - Georgia Putative Father Registry Form
- Idaho - The link on Idaho's Bureau of Vital Records and Health Statistics website says "Putative Father Registration Form" but the actual form is called "Idaho Vital Records Department of Health and Welfare Registration of Notice of Commencement of Paternity Proceedings Idaho Code, Section 16-1513." - Idaho Bureau of Vital Records and Health Statistics - Idaho Putative Father Registration Form
- Illinois - The Illinois putative father registry online form notes that registering as a putative father is only the first step in starting legal proceedings to establish paternity. The legal proceedings are called a "parentage action" and must be completed within 30 days of filing with the registry. Illinois Putative Father Registry - Illinois Putative Father Registry Form
- Indiana - The State of Indiana does not provide online forms as a matter of policy. While not having an online form the State of Indiana official website does include information where to obtain them in person at the State, County and City levels. The Indiana state Department of Health website also provides information about registration, filings and how to search the register.
- Louisiana - The Louisiana registry website notes that registering "creates a rebuttable presumption that the man is the father of the child." The website form link is called a "Putative Father Affidavit," and the actual form name is "Louisiana Vital Records Registry Acknowledgment of Paternity Putative Father Registry." State of Louisiana Department of Health and Hospitals State Registrar and Vital Records - Louisiana Putative Father Registry Form
- Minnesota - The registry in Minnesota is called the "Minnesota Fathers' Adoption Registry (MFAR)," and the form on the website is called a "Father's Adoption Registry Registration Form." Minnesota Putative Father Registry Form.
- Missouri - The Missouri Department of Health & Senior Services website lists no information about its putative father registry other than a phone number to call and a linked .pdf form called "Notice of Intent to Claim Paternity." The form does include (1) page with some information about the registry. Missouri Putative Father Registry Form.
- Nebraska - The Nebraska State Website with a little searching has a link for its statute creating a, "biological father registry". A further search for Nebraska Department of Health and Human Services, under the "Adoption" section, leads to its Adoption - Biological Father Registry webpage. The page includes .pdf forms and links to legal statutes relating to its registry. Nebraska Putative Father Registry Form - Nebraska Search Registry Form
- New Mexico - The New Mexico Department of Health, Vital Records website has a brief description of the registry and includes forms to search and to register, the links and form names even match. The State website notes that a putative father can register "no later than ten days after the birth of a child in order to be notified when an adoption is planned." Putative Father Inclusion - Putative Father Registry Inquiry
- Ohio - The Ohio Department of Job and Family Services has an interactive online form and information about obtaining a physical copy of the form is also listed. The site also gives general information about its registry. Ohio Putative Father Registry.
- South Carolina - South Carolina has what is called a "Responsible Father Registry" (RFR). The website gives some general information and provides online forms for registration, revocation and inquiries. South Carolina Putative Father Registry Form
- Tennessee - The Tennessee Department of Children's Services website gives no information for its putative father registry and only by searching the adoption forms section can a person find the Notice of Intent to Claim Paternity. The Tennessee State Legislature 36-2-318 notes that by registering, a putative father who has later revoked or been found not the father can still be held liable for "payment of child support, medical payments on behalf of the child, or any other payments, or that may involve the payment of damages involved in connection with such parentage."
- Texas - Searching for "paternity registry" at the state of Texas website leads to the state DSHS website giving some general information about its registry. The form, which is called a "Notice of Intent to Claim Paternity - Paternity Registry," also notes that a non-married putative father may have to register in other states along with Texas. Texas Putative Father Registry Form
- Virginia - The Virginia Department of Social Services website has some information about its registry, a FAQ .pdf, link to a web form to register, mailing instructions and a putative father brochure .pdf for download. Virginia is also the only state that does not require a putative father to pay a notary public to file. (assuming states with no public posted information do not either) Virginia Department of Social Services - Virginia Putative Father Registry Web Form
- Wisconsin - The Wisconsin Department of Children and Families website lists what it calls a "Paternal Interest Registry", with links to just about everything from forms and statutes to brochures for download. The Wisconsin Putative Father Registry Form, called a "Declaration of Paternal Interest" also notes, "If the person declaring to be the father is under the age of 18, a parent or guardian of the declarant must also sign".
- Wyoming - The Wyoming Department of Family Services provides only a .pdf brochure download as information about its registry in its "adoption" section. The registry form is called "State of Wyoming Department of Family Services Putative Father Registry. Putative Father Registry - Wyoming Putative Father Registry Form

13 states with a putative registry and no registration forms publicly posted online:

- Delaware - The State of Delaware Office of Vital Statistics website has no mention of a putative father registry. Delaware Uniform Parentage Act, Chapter 8, Subchapter IV
- Iowa - The State of Iowa website's only mention of its Putative Father Registry is a link to the statute creating a registry. Iowa, 144.12A Declaration of Paternity Registry
- Kansas - The State of Kansas website has no information about its putative father registry other than a linked Kansas Supreme Court Opinion citing "Murray v. Palmgren, 231 Kan. 524, 536, 646 P.2d 1091 (1982) (ignorance of the law is no excuse)".
- Massachusetts - The Commonwealth of Massachusetts website has no mention of a "Parental Claim Registrar" nor "Putative Father Registry." Ch. 210. Sec. 4A MA.gov
- Michigan - Supposedly has a putative father registry, Section 710.33 Michigan Legislature, how to register and with what form is not listed on the state's website. The only mention of a putative registry is a form used to search the registry for putative fathers, Verification of Registry Form. A .pdf from the state of Michigan.gov called A Student's Guide to Child Support - R U Ready as a power point presentation for Michigan School Teachers has no mention of a putative father registry either.
- Montana - While technically having a registry form linked at the Montana Department of Health and Human Services website, it is in a .doc format that most over the counter home computers cannot open without aftermarket purchased software.
- New Hampshire - The New Hampshire Department of Health and Human Services (DHHS) has no mention of its putative father registry. Some forms were found from state judiciary links for what is called an "Interstate Adoption Putative Father Registry" form and a .pdf with some information PDF New Hampshire Information - New Hampshire Probate Court Administrative Office.
- New York - The New York State Office of Children and Family Services gives no information about the State's registry, how to register or an online registry form. The only online form listed is the one used to search its registry for putative fathers who have somehow already registered. New York (OCFS) - New York Registry Search Form
- Oklahoma - The Oklahoma Department of Human Services website has no listing or information about its "Centralized Paternity Registry." A DCFS-40 form for the Centralized Paternity Registry is only found with a direct records search in the "child welfare" category needing prior knowledge of what to search for. Oklahoma Records Search - Oklahoma Putative Father Registry Form
- Oregon - The State of Oregon website has no mention of its putative father registry other than two links and .pdf files for legislature meeting minutes in 2009 that no longer work.
- Pennsylvania - The Pennsylvania State website has no mention of its Putative Father Registry. The only online information located is a fax number posted by the New Hampshire Probate Court Administrative Office.
- Utah - The State of Utah website has no mention of its Putative Father Registry
- Vermont - The State of Vermont website has no information about its putative father registry. A link to the Vermont Judiciary refers to what it calls a notice of "intent to retain parental rights". Rule 80.5. Adoption Proceeding, section (i)
