= Interstate Compact on the Placement of Children =

The Interstate Compact on the Placement of Children (ICPC) is a compact among all 50 U.S. states, the District of Columbia, and the Virgin Islands providing for protection and support services for children moved between states for birth parent unification or reunification when the court has jurisdiction over the child. The ICPC ensures that the sending agency or individual does not lose jurisdiction over the child once the child moves to the receiving state. An ICPC case is closed when a child is adopted, reaches the age of majority, or becomes self-supporting or when the appropriate authorities in the sending state and receiving state agree that the ICPC case can be closed.

The idea for the ICPC was developed in the 1950s, and New York became the first party to the agreement in 1960.

== Placement process ==
A request to place a child in another state requires a court order, a case plan, a summary of information about the child, and a financial and medical plan. A ten-step process must be completed to comply with the ICPC's requirements. This process involves the ICPC offices in both states and the local social services program. There can be delays of over six months for completing the process, and some states do not accept requests for out-of-state placements.

== See also ==
- Hague Adoption Convention
