= Adoption home study =

Screening for prospective adoptive parents

A home study or homestudy is a screening of the home and life of prospective adoptive parents prior to allowing an adoption to take place. In some places, and in all international adoptions, a home study is required by law. Even where it is not legally mandated, it may be required by an adoption agency. Depending on the location and agency, different information may be sought during a home study.

A home study can be used both to aid the prospective parents in preparing to raise an adoptive child, and to rule out those who are not fit to be parents.

The ultimate purpose of a home study is for the benefit of the child, not the parents. Therefore, screeners are instructed to be thorough in their examinations.

There is typically a cost to a home study, which is usually several hundred to several thousand US dollars. In most cases, the prospective adoptive parents are responsible to cover the cost.

== Information ==
The types of information that may be sought from a home study include the determination if there is abuse in the past, family background, employment history, a criminal background check of the prospective parents, a credit check, medical records, and an examination of the home.

A home study, as its name implies, examines the dwelling of the prospective parents. Factors that may be taken into account include the cleanliness and condition of the home, fire safety, sanitation, and the well-being of the neighborhood where the home is located.

Factors pertaining to the people may include their desire to adopt, their understanding of the relationship between adoptive parents and children, and their willingness to share with an adopted child the fact that they are adopted.

== Criticism ==
Home studies are criticized by many who feel they are intrusive, or who feel that there may be discrimination against certain people who are perfectly capable of parenting, but are ruled out due to various issues.
