= International adoption =

Adoption of children between countries

International adoption (also known as intercountry or transnational adoption) is a type of adoption in which an individual or couple living in one country becomes the legal parent(s) of a child who is a national of another country. International adoptions are often, but not always, transcultural or interracial.

Laws around international adoptions vary considerably by country. Some have established rules and procedures to allow it, while others expressly forbid it. Many African nations, in particular, have residency requirements for adoptive parents that rule out most international adoptions.

Where permitted, prospective adoptive parents must meet the legal adoption requirements of their country of residence and those of the country whose nationality the child holds.

== Process overview ==
The requirements to begin the international adoption process depend entirely on the adoptive parent(s) country. Most countries require prospective parents to get approval to adopt first.

Children who go through international adoption often start in a "nursery". It is also not uncommon for a parent to place their child in a "nursery" temporarily due to poverty, work, or a desire to take advantage of the educational opportunities available in such facilities. Prospective parents of international adoptees typically have to wait for a referral for the child, which requires the biological parents of the children in the nursery to consent to the adoption. Although bureaucracy is often blamed for how slow the process can be, another contributing factor is that there are often more interested couples than there are children.

In the United States, the first stage of the process typically involves selecting a licensed adoption agency or attorney to work with. (Note: Each agency or attorney tends to work with a different set of countries, although some focus on only one country.) Pursuant to the rules of the Hague Adoption Convention, the adoption agency or attorney must be accredited by the government if the child's country is also a participant in the convention. If not, then the convention does not apply, and the adoptive parent(s) must follow the laws of the US and the child's country. In both situations, a home study and USCIS approval are required.

A dossier containing information about the prospective parents is prepared and submitted to the appropriate authorities in the child's country for review. This typically includes financial details, a background check, fingerprints, a home study review by a social worker, and a doctor's report regarding their health. (Note: The exact documents required for the dossier varies widely between countries, or even regions in places like Russia.)

After the dossier is reviewed and the prospective parents are approved to adopt internationally, they are matched to an eligible child. They are then sent information about the child, such as their age, gender, health history, etc. This is called a referral. Some countries provide a travel date at this stage, informing the parents when they may travel to meet the child and sign any additional paperwork required, though most do that later in the process.

Following this, paperwork to make the child a legal citizen of the adopting parents' country is required. In addition, one or more follow-up visits from a social worker may be required—either by the placing agency used by the adoptive parents or by the laws of the country from which the child was adopted. In the United States, the Child Citizenship Act of 2000 automatically grants citizenship to all foreign-born children when at least one adoptive parent is a U.S. citizen. Depending on the circumstances of the adoption, the grant of citizenship takes place upon the child's admission to the U.S. as an immigrant or the child's adoption in the parent's home jurisdiction.

== Major origin and receiving countries of children ==
=== Major origin countries ===
According to a 2013 study, China, Ethiopia, India, South Korea, Ukraine, and Vietnam were the most common origin countries for international adoptions between 2003 and 2011.

As of 2025, the number of international adoptions of children from China has drastically reduced. This is due to an improvement in the country's economy and the introduction of more restrictive laws prohibiting such adoptions by non-relatives after concerns were raised about the system's exploitative nature.

==== Origin countries of United States adoptions ====
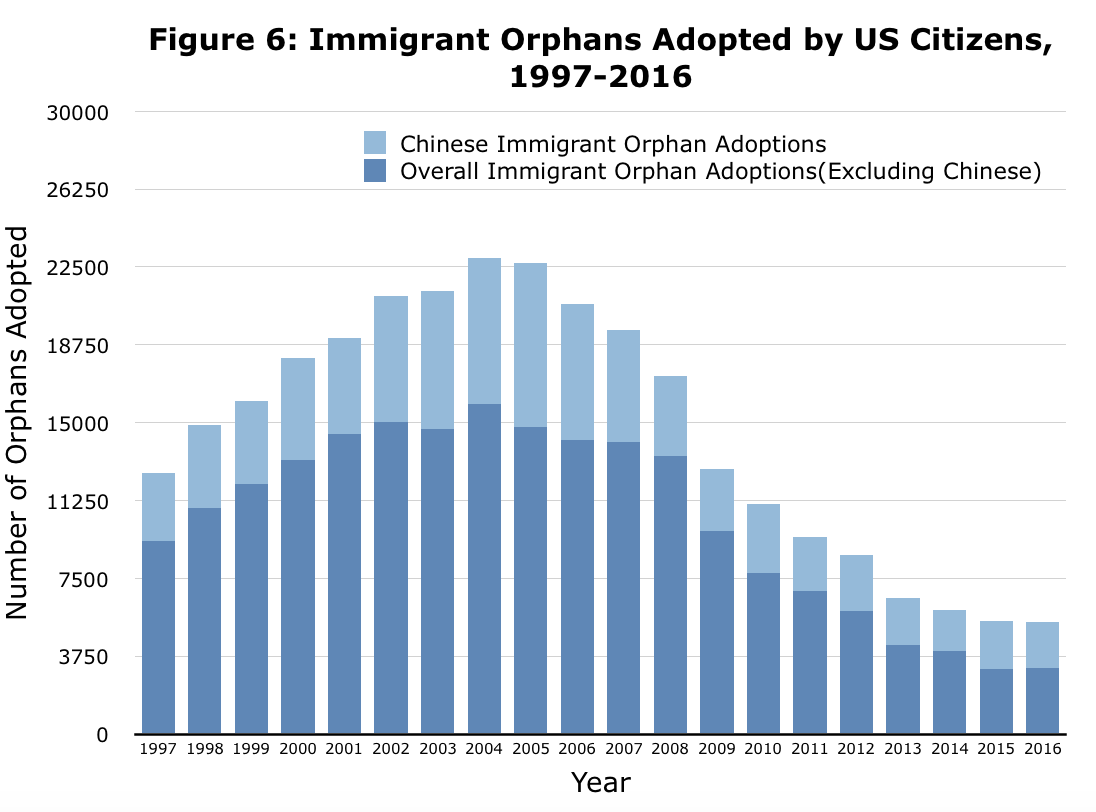
China was the leading origin country of children. In the US, at least 25% of overall international adoptions from 1997 to 2016 were of Chinese children.

In 2019, the top countries from which US citizens adopted children were China, Ukraine, Colombia, India, South Korea, Bulgaria, Haiti, and Nigeria. Adoption from Ethiopia used to be common until the country banned it in 2018. There were only 11 adoptions from Ethiopia in 2019, compared with 177 in 2018 and a high of 313 in 2017, when Ethiopia was second on the list.

Romania, Belarus, Russia, and Cambodia were other major origin countries until government crackdowns aimed at reducing abuse of the system were implemented. Similar bans were also instated in some Eastern European countries in the 2000s for the same reasons.

=== Major receiving countries ===
The top ten countries from which prospective parents originated between 2004 and 2021 were:

Rank	Country	Total adoptions 2004-2021
1	US	187,578
2	Italy	47,287
3	Spain	37,688
4	France	35,353
5	Canada	21,648
6	Sweden	10,113
7	Netherlands	9,253
8	Germany	7,228
9	Norway	4,706
10	Denmark	4,623

A related study found that the top five countries accounted for more than 80% of overall international adoptions from 1998 to 2007, and the US accounted for approximately 50% of all cases.

== Trends in receiving countries ==
=== United States ===
Although historically the United States has been among the top receiving countries, the numbers have declined dramatically in recent years. In 2019, only 2,971 children were adopted internationally, compared to 22,884 in 2004. This is attributed to a combination of factors, including increased bureaucracy due to the implementation of the Hague Convention guidelines, new legal restrictions in origin countries leading to a reduction in the number of children that can be adopted, increased cost, corruption in some foreign courts and orphanages, and the implementation of policies only allowing the adoption of children with significant special needs in many countries.

=== European countries ===
Since the 1970s, European countries such as Spain, France, Italy, and several Scandinavian countries have experienced a considerable increase in the demand for adopted children from non-European countries. Studies have suggested various causes for this increase, including:

- A trend in the Global North of delaying conception of the first child, which increases the risk of reduced fertility and the demand for adoption
- Reduced numbers of children available for adoption within the same country

Recent data, however, show a stabilization or even a decrease in inter-country adoptions in many European countries. This may be due to factors including:

- A decrease in the causes of abandonment and increased economic development
- The implementation of social policies in favor of families
- Reduced stigmatization of unmarried mothers
- An increase in national adoptions in the main origin countries
- Increased regulation and new policies adopted by some countries of origin (e.g., Romania) aimed at regulating the outflow of children and preventing child trafficking

The trends vary considerably between countries. For example, Spain, France, and Italy experienced a 70% increase in international adoptions between 2000 and 2005, while numbers decreased in Switzerland and Germany and remained stable in Norway.

== Sex ratio of children adopted (US and Europe) ==
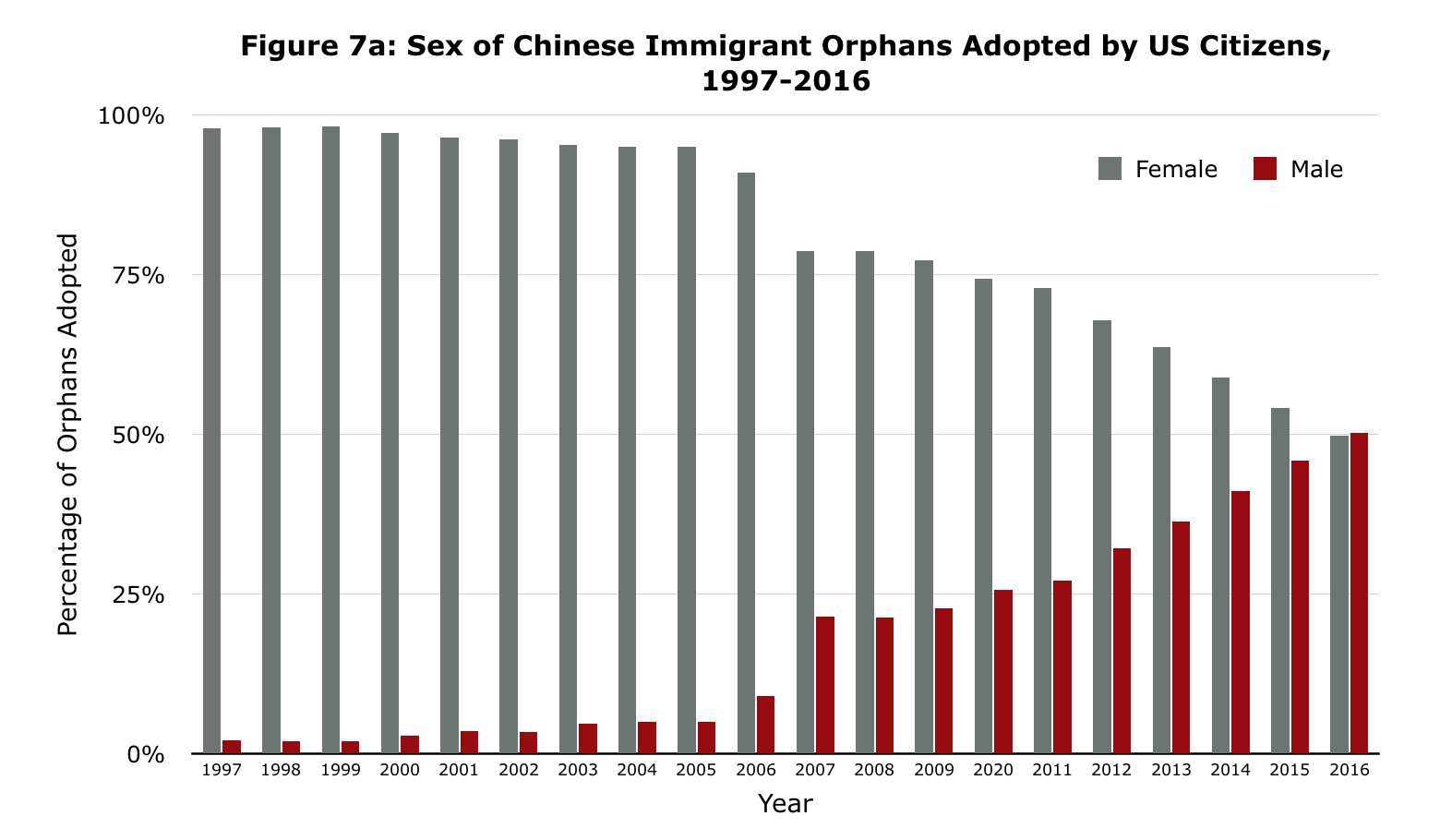
Chart showing the sex of children adopted from China by US citizens in the period 1997–2016. In all the years shown except 2016, more adoptees were girls.

Historically, the US adopts more girls than boys. From 1999 to 2012, around 62% of adoptees by US families were girls, while only 38% were boys. In recent years, however, this discrepancy has gradually declined, and the sex ratio is now more balanced.

Until the early 2000s, 90-95% of Chinese children adopted by US families were girls. This was because China had more girls available for adoption as a result of the Chinese culture's preference for sons and the implementation of the planned birth policy in 1979. For numerous reasons, including the amendment of the policy, adopting families' preference for girls, and an increase in sex selective abortions, most orphanages in the country now only house children with special needs, the majority of whom are male.

Comparatively, a majority of children adopted from India, South Korea, and other East Asian countries tend to be boys.

== International legal framework ==
At the international level, the main legal instrument on intercountry adoption is the Hague Adoption Convention. Additionally, the United Nations Convention on the Rights of the Child and the UN Declaration on Social and Legal Principles relating to the Protection and Welfare of Children contain some specific references to intercountry adoption. The latter, in particular, calls on Member States to establish policy, legislation and effective supervision to protect children involved in the process.

These three legal instruments share some common principles:

- The child's best interest should be the paramount consideration.
- The child should be placed through competent authorities or agencies with the same safeguards and standards as domestic adoptions.
- In no case should an adoption result in improper financial gains for those involved.
- The principle of subsidiarity, according to which intercountry adoption should only take place when suitable adoptive parents (or next of kin) cannot be identified in the country of origin of the child. The international community, however, disagrees on whether the option of being placed in a permanent family setting through international adoption should prevail over the alternative of placing the child in residential care institutions.

The United Nations Optional Protocol to the Convention on the Rights of the Child on the Sale of Children, Child Prostitution and Child Pornography also calls on Member States to ensure that coercive adoption is criminalized under national law, regardless of whether the offense is committed domestically or transnationally, on an individual or organized basis.

=== UN Declaration on Social and Legal Principles relating to the Protection and Welfare of Children ===
The General Assembly adopted the UN Declaration on Social and Legal Principles relating to the Protection and Welfare of Children by resolution 41/85 on 3 December 1986. Salient sections of the declaration include:

- A point in the annex reaffirming that "wherever possible, [the child shall] grow up in the care and under the responsibility of his parents and, in any case, in an atmosphere of affection and of moral and material security."
- Article 15 commanding Member States to ensure "sufficient time and adequate counseling" is provided to the "child's own parents, the prospective adoptive parents [and] the child in order to reach a decision on the child's future."
- Article 17 affirming the principle of subsidiarity.
- Article 24 requiring Member States to consider the child's cultural and religious background and interests.

=== UN Convention on the Rights of the Child ===
UN Convention on the Rights of the Child marked a turning point in international law by recognizing the child as an active subject whose views and best interests must be taken into consideration in all matters concerning them whether undertaken by public or private social welfare institutions, courts of law, administrative authorities, or legislative bodies. Article 21, in particular, requires that Member States "ensure that the adoption of a child is authorized only by competent authorities who determine that the adoption is permissible in view of the child's status concerning parents, relatives and legal guardians and that, if required, the persons concerned have given their informed consent to the adoption [and must not] result in improper financial gain for those involved."

=== The Hague Adoption Convention ===
The Hague Adoption Convention came into force in May 1995. While previous multilateral instruments included some provisions on intercountry adoption, it was the first to focus entirely on regulating international adoptions and remains, to date, the biggest international agreement on the subject. It calls for coordination and direct cooperation between countries to ensure that appropriate safeguards promote the child's best interests and prevent them from being abducted, sold, or trafficked. It also provides formal international and intergovernmental recognition of intercountry adoption, ensuring that adoptions under the convention are recognized in other party countries.

As of March 2024, 106 states are party to the convention. Korea, Nepal, and the Russian Federation are signatories but have not ratified.

The Convention also requires that all processes should be authorized by central adoption authorities designated by the contracting states. It does, however, allow Member States to decide which public agency is the central adoption authority, whose supervision and authorization are necessary to proceed with adoption, and which other bodies should be accredited as providers of adoption services. (Note: Chapter III of the Convention outlines the roles and responsibilities of this authority.) When fully implemented at the national level, the Convention also offers a protective framework against the risks potentially implied in private adoption. (Note: Private international adoption is when the prospective parents set the terms of the adoption directly with the birth parents or with children's institutions placed in the country of origin, without using accredited adoption service providers.)

At the time of its introduction, there were concerns that increased bureaucratization of the adoption process, due to the implementation of the Hague Adoption Convention, would create additional barriers to the placement of children. The Implementation and Operation of the 1993 Intercountry Adoption Convention: Guide to Good Practice was published to provide guidance on the use and interpretation of the Convention.

Many changes have been introduced in national legislation to comply with international standards, including new laws criminalizing the act of obtaining improper gains from intercountry adoptions. Instances of trafficking and the sale of adopted children, however, continue to take place in many parts of the world. During emergencies, such as natural disasters or conflicts, in particular, children are more likely to be adopted without following appropriate legal procedures, increasing the risk of these outcomes.

== Regional and domestic legal orders ==
=== Africa ===
==== The Democratic Republic of Congo (DRC) ====
On 25 September 2013, the government of the Democratic Republic of Congo suspended exit permits that would allow children to depart the country with their adoptive parents until the parliament enacted new legislation reforming the adoption process. Although Congolese courts continue to issue new adoption decrees, the Direction Générale de Migration, which controls points of entry, does not currently recognize them. As a result, the US Department of State announced on 6 October 2014 that it strongly recommends against adopting from the country. As of 2024, international adoptions from the DRC remain impossible.

Before this, only homosexuals, pedophiles, and mentally ill individuals were forbidden from international adoption in the DRC. All other adoptions were possible when competent authorities in the origin state had verified that they had considered the child’s best interests and that consent for adoption was given, where possible, by the child or their biological parents, without coercion or retraction.

==== Ethiopia ====
Ethiopia is not a signatory to the 1980 Hague Convention on the Civil Aspects of International Child Abduction. Furthermore, it had no agreements with countries to outlaw child abduction in cases of international adoptions either. Yet, in 2007, Ethiopia ranked 5th among countries for international adoption by Americans, up from 16th place in 2000.

International adoptions rose, in particular, after Angelina Jolie's adoption of her daughter, Zahara Marley Jolie, in 2005. The US embassy to Ethiopia reported that adoption numbers in the country had risen so much that it had to hire extra staff to handle the workload. The high interest for American and European families, as well as the cheap and easy adoption process, made the US embassy concerned about adoption fraud. As a result, they attempted to work with Ethiopia to improve the process. This was to little avail, as children continued to be frequently relinquished by their biological parents and listed as orphans on adoption registries to avoid lengthy court procedures.

In 2016, Denmark officially ended international adoption with Ethiopia over concerns surrounding the ethics of the adoption process, as well as the health and safety of the children involved.

In 2018, Ethiopia banned the adoption of children by foreigners. This followed the conviction of US parents, Carri and Larry Williams, who were found guilty of manslaughter after their thirteen-year-old Ethiopian adopted daughter, Hana Williams, died of hypothermia in 2011. By this time, adoptions from Ethiopia had already been decreasing, and many agencies in Addis Ababa had begun shutting down or going out of business.

The Government's official news outlet, ENA, claims that the state banned international adoptions due to concerns over child abuse and neglect overseas. From an Ethiopian standpoint, some citizens felt that international adoption was becoming "the new export industry" at the time of its peak around 2008.

=== Asia ===
==== China ====
China has been a party to the Hague Adoption Convention since January 1, 2006. All adoptions in China from another country must meet these requirements as well as domestic law. In 2024, it largely ended its international adoption program, except for relatives of the child who hold foreign nationality.

Legally, the China Center for Children's Welfare and Adoptions is the only agency authorized by the Chinese government to regulate and process all inter-country adoptions from China. The process can also only be handled through government approval, and not individual applications.

==== Taiwan ====
Taiwan is not party to the Hague Adoption Convention. Under the Protection of Children and Youths Welfare and Rights Act, the country prioritizes prospective national adoptive parents over international ones.

In most cases, prospective parents from other countries are matched to children through legal adoption matching services provided by foreign agencies or government authorities in their home country. The only exceptions to this rule are individuals adopting a relative within six degrees of kinship by blood, five degrees by marriage, or adopting their partner's children.

==== The Republic of Korea ====
The Republic of Korea became a signatory to the Hague Adoption Convention on 24 May 2013. The terms came into effect over a decade later, on 1 October 2025. In addition, the country has domestic laws requiring the use of adoption agencies authorized by the Ministry for Health, Welfare and Family Affairs and approval from the Family Court for all international adoptions. The Special Adoption Act also prioritizes domestic adoptions and endeavors to reduce the number of South Korean children adopted abroad.

==== India ====
India is a party to the Hague Adoption Convention. In January 2011, the country implemented additional domestic procedures to centralize the international adoption process further.

==== Vietnam ====
Vietnam is a party to the Hague Adoption Convention. The country also has requirements for foreign adoptive parents under Article 14 of the Law on Adoption Act, which came into effect on 1 January 2011.

=== Europe ===
==== Council of Europe ====
While European laws on international adoption vary by country, several attempts to harmonize the process among Member States of the Council of Europe, such as the European Convention on the Adoption of Children, have been made. In 2008, a Working Party of the Committee of Experts on Family Law prepared a revised version of the Convention under the authority of the European Committee on Legal Cooperation, and it opened for signature on 27 November. As of 2026, 16 of the 46 Member States have ratified it, while 3 signatories have not and 2 additional countries have since denounced it.

The European Convention establishes common principles, procedures, and legal consequences to govern adoption, in an effort to reduce difficulties in promoting the welfare of adopted children caused by differences in legislation and practice among European States. Among its essential provisions, the Convention stipulates that a competent judicial or administrative authority must grant the adoption, that birth parents must freely consent to the adoption, and that the adoption must be in the child's best interests. Any improper financial advantages arising from the adoption of a child are prohibited.

==== European Union ====
Within the European Union, intercountry adoption is partly governed by Article 4 of Council Directive 2003/86/EC of September 22, 2003. This regulates the immigration of adoptive third-country-national children, provided that the parents are established third-country nationals within the EU. Accordingly, EU Member States must authorize the entry and residence of children adopted in accordance with a decision taken by the competent authority of the Member State concerned, or one that is automatically enforceable due to the Member State's international obligations.

With the ratification and adoption of the Hague Adoption Convention, European countries have developed training for social workers responsible for providing international adoption-related services. For example, Italy and Germany have appointed competent specialists and created a centralized control system. In Switzerland, on the other hand, the bureaucratization of procedures has been considered to have slowed the process, resulting in a decrease in the number of children adopted.

Traditionally in Spain, France and Switzerland, prospective parents can choose to adopt internationally with or without a referral through an accredited body. In Italy and Norway, the second option, considered as "private adoption", is forbidden. The only exception is for prospective adoptive couples where one spouse is a native of the child's country of origin, or for Italian families who have lived in the other country for a long time and have a significant connection to its culture. In these two cases, they can submit an international adoption request to the International Social Service.

France and Germany have adopted a third path, creating public bodies that simultaneously serve as formal intermediaries and act as central adoption authorities. Data shows that in all European countries, both those that legally prohibit and allow for it, the practice of private adoption is widespread and has raised child trafficking concerns. Many European countries have also signed bilateral agreements with the countries of origin of adopted children, though these cannot disregard the guarantees provided by the Hague Adoption Convention.

=== North America ===
==== United States ====
The United States is bound by both domestic and international laws governing child adoption. The laws cover US families adopting children from abroad, and families abroad adopting US-born children. Many US children are adopted abroad.

The US tends to prefer multilateral agreements for international adoptions over bilateral ones because Senate ratification is a lengthy process. For instance, although the US acceded to the Hague Convention in 2000, it took eight years for it to come into effect for these reasons. They have also declared that it does not supersede Title 18 of the United States Code, Section 3190 governing documents submitted to the Government in support of extradition requests.

Similarly, the Senate has not ratified the UN Convention on the Rights of the Child, despite the US signing it on 16 February 1995. This was initially due to the states' rights to execute minors tried as adults. While the Supreme Court deemed this practice unconstitutional in 2005, the country has yet to reverse its position.

The Intercountry Adoption Universal Accreditation Act of 2012 extended the Hague Convention rights to all foreign children adopted by US parents, regardless of their country of origin. It also governs accreditation, oversight, and enforcement for adoption agencies involved in intercountry adoption. Before the 2000 Act, providers were regulated only by state laws and state licensing authorities, with varying standards in each state.

===== Origin countries with limits or bans on adoption to the United States =====
The following countries do not or only partially accept inter-country adoption requests from the US:

- Russia: In December 2012, Russian President Vladimir Putin signed into law a measure, effective January 1, 2013, banning the adoption of Russian children by US families. The ban was seen as diplomatic retaliation for the Magnitsky Act, though support in Russia also focused on incidents of abuse of adopted children by US parents. In January 2013, about 20,000 people marched against the law in Moscow.

The US also suspended adoptions of children from the following countries:

- Vietnam: Were temporarily suspended due to allegations of corruption and baby-selling in 2013.
- Guatemala: Banned in 2007 after allegations of corruption, families being coerced, and children kidnapped to feed US demand.

== Motivations ==
Adopting families in general have a variety of motivations, such as infertility, being a same-sex couple or single parent, and not wanting to contribute to human overpopulation. Some adoptions compensate for problematic attitudes or practices in the source country, such as abandonment of girls and children with disabilities or serious medical problems, or for economic or aesthetic reasons.

International adoptions can have additional motivations, including reducing the chance that a biological family member will later challenge the adoption or interfere in the child's life, rescuing a child from a life of poverty, and "saving" a child in the religious sense of converting them to the family's religion. In particular, evangelical Christians have been urged to adopt internationally in addition to having large biological families.

== Controversy ==
There is considerable controversy regarding the ethics of international adoption. Some argue that international adoption is now more about providing first-world parents with children rather than finding safe homes for those who are impoverished or displaced. Others say that while international adoption may be beneficial, abandoned children should be able to be taken back by their previous families and advise governments to provide small monetary incentives to families who are willing to do so.

=== Culture and ethnicity ===
International adoption generates additional controversy when the children will be raised in a different culture or religion than they were born into, or by parents of a different ethnicity. This is especially problematic where it is visually apparent to others in the society and can lead to stigmatization or discrimination.

=== Ethical violations and exploitation ===
Ethical dilemmas surrounding international adoption typically arise from falsely representing a child as an orphan when parents are still alive, as without family when extended family members are willing to adopt, as more impoverished than they actually are, or as having no siblings they would be leaving behind. Another problem is agencies incorrectly misrepresenting permanent adoption as a program to temporarily send children to a developed country for educational opportunities to biological parents or paying them to relinquish custody of their children.

The global demand to adopt infants is higher than the number of infants available for adoption. This encourages international adoption and creates financial incentives to identify more young children for adoption, especially in developing countries and those with high levels of societal corruption or poor law enforcement.

Certain aspects of international adoption make it easier for agencies and child recruiters to commit adoption fraud, including distance, language barriers, difficulty enforcing laws across international boundaries, and adoption agency contracts disclaiming responsibility for incorrect biographical details.

=== After a disaster ===
Campaigns for international adoption are especially common after disasters such as hurricanes, tsunamis, and wars. There is often an outpouring of adoption proposals in such cases from foreigners who want to give homes to children left in need. While adoption may be a way to provide stable, loving families for children in need, in the immediate aftermath of trauma or upheaval, it may worsen the mental health of the child.

Additionally, the parents may have survived and been unable to find the children, or a relative or neighbor may have been able to provide food and shelter. It may be more beneficial to provide safety and emotional support than to relocate the child to a new adoptive family immediately. There is an increased risk that displaced children may be more vulnerable to exploitation and child trafficking following a disaster as well.

=== Critiques of adoption from Africa to the United States ===
Between the 1980s and 2010s, the number of US citizens interested in adopting African children rose. In 1986, 10,019 such foreign adoptions took place. This was partly due to many African countries having lenient restrictions and protocols around the process, with Ethiopia, Guinea-Bissau, Swaziland, and Liberia among the least restrictive at the time.

This increase in transracial adoption rates has led to significant critiques. The National Association of Black Social Workers has concluded that because of the historical relations between the two races, white parents cannot adequately prepare their adopted children for how society treats people of color. The American Adoption Association has similarly stated that transracial adoptees tend to struggle with their racial and cultural self-identities due to the lack of connection to their birth cultures.

== Personal impact ==
=== Effects on adoptive children ===
Adults who were adopted from other countries as children can experience lifelong difficulties. Many children grow up with a total loss of connection to their biological families, culture, and roots. In 2025, the artist Uma Feed, who is known for her visual and performance artwork on her experience being born in Korea and adopted by Norwegian parents, filed a lawsuit against the Norwegian state, seeking compensation for having been trafficked as an infant. Similarly, Kim Yoo-ree, who was adopted from South Korea to France, is also suing the Korean State. There are several other such cases. Additionally, multiple adoptees have been deported from the United States, and tens of thousands of adult adoptees in the United States lack citizenship, leaving them in a precarious and impermanent legal situation. Additionally, in 2026 the United States Department of Homeland Security has investigated two noncitizen adopted people for potential criminal prosecution for voting, potentially leading to deportation proceedings. At least one adoptee has been sent back from the United States to their country of origin by their adoptive parent. Multiple international adoptees have been killed by their adoptive parents.

=== Effects on adoptive parents ===
Adoption is a long and arduous process for both the adoptive parent(s) and the child. The home study process, in particular, can be "intrusive".

Unidentified trauma from the adopted child can be hard to pinpoint and treat. Adopted children can also have a fear of rejection and abandonment, which makes it hard for the parent(s) to connect instantly with the child. This, in turn, can trigger feelings of being let down, sadness, and depression in the parent(s).

== In popular culture ==
Blue Bayou, a film written and directed by Justin Chon, depicts a Korean-American man who is adopted by a white family and is at risk of deportation because his parents did not file for his citizenship. The movie is based on true stories about interracial adoption following the introduction of the Child Citizenship Act of 2000.

== See also ==
- Effects of adoption on the birth mother
- International adoption of South Korean children
- List of international adoption scandals
