= Adoption tax credit =

U.S. tax credit designed to aid people who adopt a child

An adoption tax credit is a tax credit offered to adoptive parents to encourage adoption in the United States. Section 36C of the United States Internal Revenue code offers a credit for “qualified adoption expenses” paid or incurred by individual taxpayers.

According to the Internal Revenue Service (IRS), "Tax benefits for adoption include both a tax credit for qualified adoption expenses paid to adopt an eligible child and an exclusion for employer-provided adoption assistance". For tax years 1997 through 2009, the credit was nonrefundable. For 2010 and 2011, the credit was refundable. For tax year 2012, the credit has reverted to being nonrefundable. The American Taxpayer Relief Act of 2012 enacted January 2, 2012 permanently extended the adoption tax credit. For the 2024 tax year the nonrefundable maximum tax credit (dollar limitation) per child is $16,890.The credit begins to phase out when modified adjusted gross income (MAGI) exceeds an amount set every year and is eliminated when MAGI exceeds a maximum amount. The tax credit is claimed on IRS form 8839 Qualified Adoption Expenses.

== History of adoption tax incentives ==
The amount of tax credit limit is based on the year the adoption is finalized and claimed on IRS form 8839.

[Adoption Tax Credit Limit]
[Tax Year]	[Tax Credit Type]	[Amount]
[2024]	[nonrefundable tax credit]	[$16,890]
[2023]	[nonrefundable tax credit]	[$15,950]
[2022]	[nonrefundable tax credit]	[$14,890]
[2021]	[nonrefundable tax credit]	[$14,440]
[2020]	[nonrefundable tax credit]	[$14,300]
[2019]	[nonrefundable tax credit]	[$14,080]
[2018]	[nonrefundable tax credit]	[$13,810]
[2017]	[nonrefundable tax credit]	[$13,570]
[2016]	[nonrefundable tax credit]	[$13,460]
[2015]	[nonrefundable tax credit]	[$13,400]
[2014]	[nonrefundable tax credit]	[$13,190]
[2013]	[nonrefundable tax credit]	[$12,970]
[2012]	[nonrefundable tax credit]	[$12,650]
[2011]	[refundable tax credit]	[$13,360]
[2010]	[refundable tax credit]	[$13,170]
[2009]	[nonrefundable tax credit]	[$12,150]
[2008]	[nonrefundable tax credit]	[$11,650]
[2007]	[nonrefundable tax credit]	[$11,390]
[2006]	[nonrefundable tax credit]	[$10,960]
[2005]	[nonrefundable tax credit]	[$10,630]
[2004]	[nonrefundable tax credit]	[$10,390]
[2003]	[nonrefundable tax credit]	[$10,160]
[2002]	[nonrefundable tax credit]	[$10,000]
[2001]	[nonrefundable tax credit]	[$5,000]
[2000]	[nonrefundable tax credit]	[$5,000]
[1999]	[nonrefundable tax credit]	[$5,000]
[1998]	[nonrefundable tax credit]	[$5,000]
[1997]	[nonrefundable tax credit]	[$5,000]
[1981-1996]	[tax deduction]	[$1,500]

From 1997 to 2001 a special needs adoption qualified for up to $6,000 of adoption tax credit. From 1981 to 1996 a $1,500 itemized tax deduction existed for special needs adoptions only.

The Contract with America document released during the 1994 election campaign included a proposed Family Reenforcement Act which included language about tax incentives for adoption. Democratic President Bill Clinton endorsed the idea of an adoption tax credit in a letter to Speaker of the House Newt Gingrich stating the tax credit would ease the cost of adoption for many families. The Small Business Job Protection Act of 1996 created the adoption tax credit in Internal Revenue Code with an Initial $5,000 tax credit limit ($6,000 for special needs adoptions).

== Tax year to claim the adoption tax credit ==
Domestic adoptions expenses are claimed for a tax credit in the tax year following when they are paid. Both domestic and foreign adoption expenses are claimed in the tax year the adoption is final. Domestic adoption expenses are allowed even when the adoption process is abandoned. Adoption expenses per child accumulate so any expenses taken for the credit in a prior year are evaluated in determining whether the maximum tax credit has been obtained.

[Domestic Adoption]
[If you pay qualifying expenses in..]	[..Then take the credit in..]
[Any year before the adoption becomes final]	[The year AFTER the year of payment]
[The year the adoption becomes final]	[The year the adoption becomes final]
[The year an adoption attempt failed]	[The year AFTER the year of payment]
[Any year after final adoption]	[The year of payment]

Tax credit rules are different for a foreign adoption.

[Foreign Adoption]
[If you pay qualifying expenses in..]	[..Then take the credit in..]
[Any year before the adoption becomes final]	[The year the adoption becomes final]
[The year the adoption becomes final]	[The year the adoption becomes final]
[The year an adoption attempt failed]	[an amount of $0 - The expenses are not eligible for a credit]
[Any year after final adoption]	[The year of payment]

== Qualified adoption expenses ==
Under US tax law, qualified expenses include adoption fees, court costs, attorney fees, traveling expenses (including amounts spent for meals and lodging while away from home), and other expenses directly related to and for which the principal purpose is the legal adoption of an eligible child. The adoption tax credit is per child, thus the credit doubles when adopting two children in the same year. It is also important to note that this is a "credit," not a mere "deduction." A tax credit is a dollar for dollar reduction of federal tax, not a reduction of taxable income, such as with a mortgage payment.

== Special needs adoptions ==
Parents who adopt a child with special needs can claim the full credit without documenting expenses. There are several factors that determine if a child has "special needs" and those factors can vary by state.

A child with special needs has a factor or condition (uniquely defined by each State) that may involve any of the following:

  Ethnic or racial background
  Age
  Membership in a sibling group
  Medical, physical, or emotional disabilities
  Risk of physical, mental, or emotional disability based on birth family history
  Any condition that makes it more difficult to find an adoptive family

These broader definitions of "special needs" may be used to determine eligibility for Federal financial assistance for adoption of children and youth from the U.S. foster care system. While there's no single Federal definition of special needs, according to title IV-E of the Social Security Act, a child or youth with special needs must also meet the following two requirements to be eligible for Federal adoption assistance:

1. The child or youth cannot or should not be returned home to his or her parent(s).

2. An unsuccessful attempt was made to place the child or youth without adoption (financial) assistance, except in cases where such a placement would not have been in the best interests of the child or youth.

Parents will need to document the child has special needs, and this documentation can include the adoption assistance/adoption subsidy agreement, a letter from the state/county approving the child for adoption assistance/adoption subsidy, or a letter from the state/county child welfare agency stating that the child has special needs. See question 13 at the FAQs for information about documentation.

Special Needs Tax Credit legislation has been introduced many times in congress to expand special needs adoption tax credit benefits to adults and disabled individuals.

== Documentation ==
You should keep all financial records, legal agreements, and written adoption paperwork, including home study paperwork. Financial records include invoices, bank statements, and copies of written checks. Most audits in adoption tax credit matters are done by correspondence so in the case of an audit, you and your accountant will typically communicate with the Internal Revenue Service IRS by mail and fax. Tax audits can only occur for 3 past tax years so you only need to retain records related to adoption expenses for 4 years.

International adoptions require additional paperwork and registrations once the child has been adopted abroad and resides in the United States (US). A US social security number and card, a passport, a US birth certificates and US readoption are additional documents that may be needed for a child who permanently resides in the United States. Readoption is a means of documenting the parent child relationship under US law.

The IRS may request the final adoption decree, placement agreement from an authorized agency, court documents and the state's determination that the child is a special needs child.

== IRS oversight ==
For the 2012 tax filing season 90% of adoption tax credit claims were subject to IRS review and 69% were audited. The Office of the Taxpayer Advocate cites this as a serious problem within the IRS. The average delay for these correspondence audits was 126 days. Over 55% of these correspondence audits were closed with no changes.

== State adoption tax benefits ==
Many states have adoption tax benefits that are in addition to the federal tax credit. These tax benefits are for state residents and claimed when they file their state tax returns:

[State Adoption Tax Credit]
[State]	[Tax Credit Type]	[Amount]
[California]	[nonrefundable credit]	[$2,500]
[Georgia]	[nonrefundable tax credit]	[$2,000]
[Kansas]	[nonrefundable tax credit]	[25-75% of federal credit + $1,500 for special needs]
[Mississippi]	[nonrefundable tax credit]	[$2,500]
[Missouri]	[nonrefundable tax credit]	[$10,000]
[Montana]	[nonrefundable tax credit]	[$1,000]
[Ohio]	[nonrefundable tax credit]	[$10,000]
[W. Virginia]	[nonrefundable tax credit]	[$2,000]
[Utah]	[refundable tax credit]	[$1,000]
[Iowa]	[refundable tax credit]	[$5,000]
[N. Carolina]	[nonrefundable tax credit]	[50% of federal credit]
[Arizona]	[exclusion]	[$3,000]
[N. Mexico]	[exclusion]	[$1,000]
[N. Dakota]	[exclusion]	[$1,750]
[Oklahoma]	[exclusion]	[$20,000]
[S. Carolina]	[exclusion]	[$2,000]
[Wisconsin]	[exclusion]	[$5,000]

Many of these states limit benefits to adoptions of children in foster care within the state. Additionally, some states such as Florida grant free college tuition to public institutions within the state of adoption. In Florida, this applies to adoptions by a member of a child's extended family as well.
