= Open adoption =

Adoption with contact to biological family

Open adoption is a form of adoption in which the biological and adoptive families have access to varying degrees of each other's personal information and have an option of contact. While open adoption is a relatively new phenomenon in the west, it has been a traditional practice in many Asian societies, especially in South Asia, for many centuries. In Hindu society, for example, it is relatively common for a childless couple to adopt the second or later son of the husband's brother when the childless couple has limited hope of producing their own child.

In an open adoption, the adoptive parents hold all the rights as the legal parents, yet the individuals of the biological and adoptive families may exercise the option to open the contact in varying forms: from just sending mail and/or photos, to face-to-face visits between birth and adoptive families.

== History of openness in adoption ==
Although open adoptions are thought to be a relatively new phenomenon, most adoptions in the United States until the twentieth century were open. Until the 1930s, most adoptive parents and biological parents had contact at least during the adoption process. In many cases, adoption was seen as a social support: young children were adopted out not only to help their parents (by reducing the number of children they had to support) but also to help another family by providing an apprentice.

Adoptions became closed when social pressures mandated that families preserve the myth that they were formed biologically. One researcher has referred to these families, that made every attempt to match the child physically to their adoptive families, as 'as if' families.

Open adoption has slowly become more common since research in the 1970s suggested that open adoption was better for children. In 1975 the tide began to change, and by the early 1990s open adoptions were offered by a majority of American adoption agencies. Especially rapid progress was seen in the late 1980s and early 1990s - between 1987 and 1989 a study found only a third of agencies offered fully open adoption as an option; by 1993 76 percent of the surveyed agencies offered fully open adoptions. As of 2013, roughly half of US states consider them legally binding, however contact in open adoption is not always maintained.

The social stigma of unmarried motherhood, particularly during the Baby Scoop Era (1945-1975) rendered single mothers as social outcasts. By the 1980s, the situation improved greatly and the vast majority of unwed mothers kept their babies. In a mother-driven society after WWII, infertile couples were also seen as deficient due to their inability to bear children. The social experiment of taking children from "unmarried mothers" and "giving" them to adoptive parents became the norm during the Baby Scoop Era. These adoptions were predominantly closed. The records were sealed, biological mothers were told to keep their child a secret, and adoptive parents told to treat the child "as if born to" them.

According to a 2012 report in the Washington Times, 95% of US infant adoptions now have some level of openness between adoptive and birth parents. As of 2024, the Adoption Network considers 95% of domestic adoptions in the US to be open.

== Pre-birth openness in the United States ==
In the past when an American birth mother would go to an adoption agency to place her child for adoption, the agency took full responsibility in selecting the adoptive family, with the birth mother playing no role. Most adoption agencies in the US since the early 1990s have offered some, or complete, openness.

Although practices vary state by state, most adoptions start with the birth mother reviewing dozens of adoption profile books or online profiles of prospective adoptive parents. Usually, these are adoptive families who have retained that agency or attorney to assist them in the adoption process. Most US states permit full openness not just regarding identities, but also personal information about each other. Just as the adoptive parents want to learn about the birth mother's life and health history, so does the birth mother want the same information about the people she is considering as the parents for her child.

When the birth mother has narrowed down her prospective adoptive parents to one or a few families, normally they arrange to meet in person. Good adoption agencies and attorneys do this in a pressure-free setting where no one is encouraged to make an immediate decision. If they are geographically distant from each other (as some adoptions are interstate, with the birth mother living in a different state from the adoptive parents), the first meeting will normally be by phone, then advance to a face-to-face meeting if the meeting by phone went as well as hoped.

Many birth mothers do more than just meet the adoptive parents once before the birth. If they live close enough to each other it is not uncommon for the birth mother to invite the adoptive mother (or adoptive father too if the birth mother wishes) to come to her doctor appointments. This may allow all parties to the adoption a chance to bond. Adoptive parents may be present for the delivery if that is the birth mother's wish.

== Post-birth openness ==
Although pre-birth openness is becoming routine in newborn adoptions there are more variations in the years following the birth, after the adoption has been completed. Some birth mothers want to get to know the adoptive parents before the birth, but then wish to go "their own way" in life thereafter. Getting to know the adoptive family gives her confidence in the placement and the knowledge she can feel secure in the child's future with the parents (or single parent) she selected. The birth mother may feel that future contact with the adoptive parents, or the child, would be emotionally difficult for her.

Likely the most common arrangement in open adoptions is for the adoptive parents to commit to sending the birth mother photos of the child (and themselves as a family) each year, and short written updates, until the child reaches the age of 18. Often these photos and updates will be sent more than just once a year, such as the child's birthday or other significant events. Sometimes an intermediary is selected to receive and forward the updates, and sometimes it is done directly. This can be through mail or email. Some adoptions are more open than just sending photos and updates and include face-to-face contact. The amount of contact can vary greatly from just once in the first year, to multiple times annually throughout the child's life. Some of the adoptees raised in open adoption are now in adulthood and are writing about the experience of growing up in an open adoption.

The birth and adoptive parents will often sign a Post-Adoption Contract (sometimes called an Open Adoption Agreement), putting in writing any promises regarding contact after the adoption is finalized. Even in those states which do not expressly have laws in this area, these agreements can usually be prepared if the parties desire to formalize the agreement. In an increasing number of US states, courts will find these agreements legally enforceable, as long as they serve the best interests of the child. It is not unusual for these agreements to be more like "handshake" agreements, although they offer less protection to a birth parent if the adoptive parent's promises were not honored.

== Birth fathers ==
There are sometimes problems concerning birth mothers and adoption agencies who neglect to make sure the proper paperwork is done on the birth father's part. It is crucial to remember that no child can be relinquished legally without the birth father's consent, except in Utah. He must be given the chance to claim custody of the child. For this purpose, many states have established a Putative father registry, although some adoption activists see these as a hindrance rather than a help.

== Older children ==
The placement of older children can take two widely divergent paths. Generally speaking when a child has bonded to a birth parent then a need for an adoptive placement arises, it is usually critical for that child's emotional welfare to maintain ties with the birth parent. Sometimes a parent raised a child, but a problem has arisen, and parenting is no longer possible, and there are no family members able to take over the parenting role, so adoption is the best option.

Another way older children can be placed for adoption is where the birth parents' rights were terminated by a court due to improper parenting or abuse. Although the child may still foster idealized feelings for that failing parent it is not uncommon in these adoptions for there to be no contact between the child and adoptive parent, and the birth parent.

== Access to birth records ==
At age 18, people adopted in the United Kingdom, Australia, and in several provinces in Canada are automatically entitled to their birth certificates and may access their adoption records if in fact they are even aware that they are adopted.

In nearly all US states adoption records are sealed and withheld from public inspection after the adoption is finalized. Most states have instituted procedures by which parties to an adoption may obtain non-identifying and identifying information from an adoption record while still protecting the interests of all parties. Non-identifying information includes the date and place of the adoptee's birth; age, race, ethnicity, religion, medical history, physical description, education, occupation of the biological parents; reason for placing the child for adoption; and the existence of biological siblings.

All states allow an adoptive parents access to non-identifying information of an adoptee who is still a minor. Nearly all states allow the adoptee, upon reaching adulthood, access to non-identifying information about their relatives. Approximately 27 states allow biological parents access to non-identifying information. In addition many states give such access to adult siblings. Identifying information is any data that may lead to the positive identification of an adoptee, biological parents, or other relatives. Nearly all states permit the release of identifying information when the person whose information is sought has consented to the release. Many states ask biological parents to specify at the time of consent or surrender whether they are willing to have their identity disclosed to the adoptee when he or she is age 18 or 21. If consent is not on file, the information may not be released without a court order documenting good cause to release the information. A person seeking a court order must be able to demonstrate by clear and convincing evidence that there is a compelling reason for disclosure that outweighs maintaining the confidentiality of a party to an adoption. In Alabama, Alaska, Delaware, Kansas, New Hampshire, and Oregon, there is no requirement to document good cause in order to access their birth certificates. Some groups, such as Bastard Nation, One Voice, and Origins USA, campaign for adoptees' automatic access to birth certificates in other US states.

== See also ==
- Adoption
- Closed adoption
- Putative father registry
- Whāngai adoption
