= International child abduction in Japan =

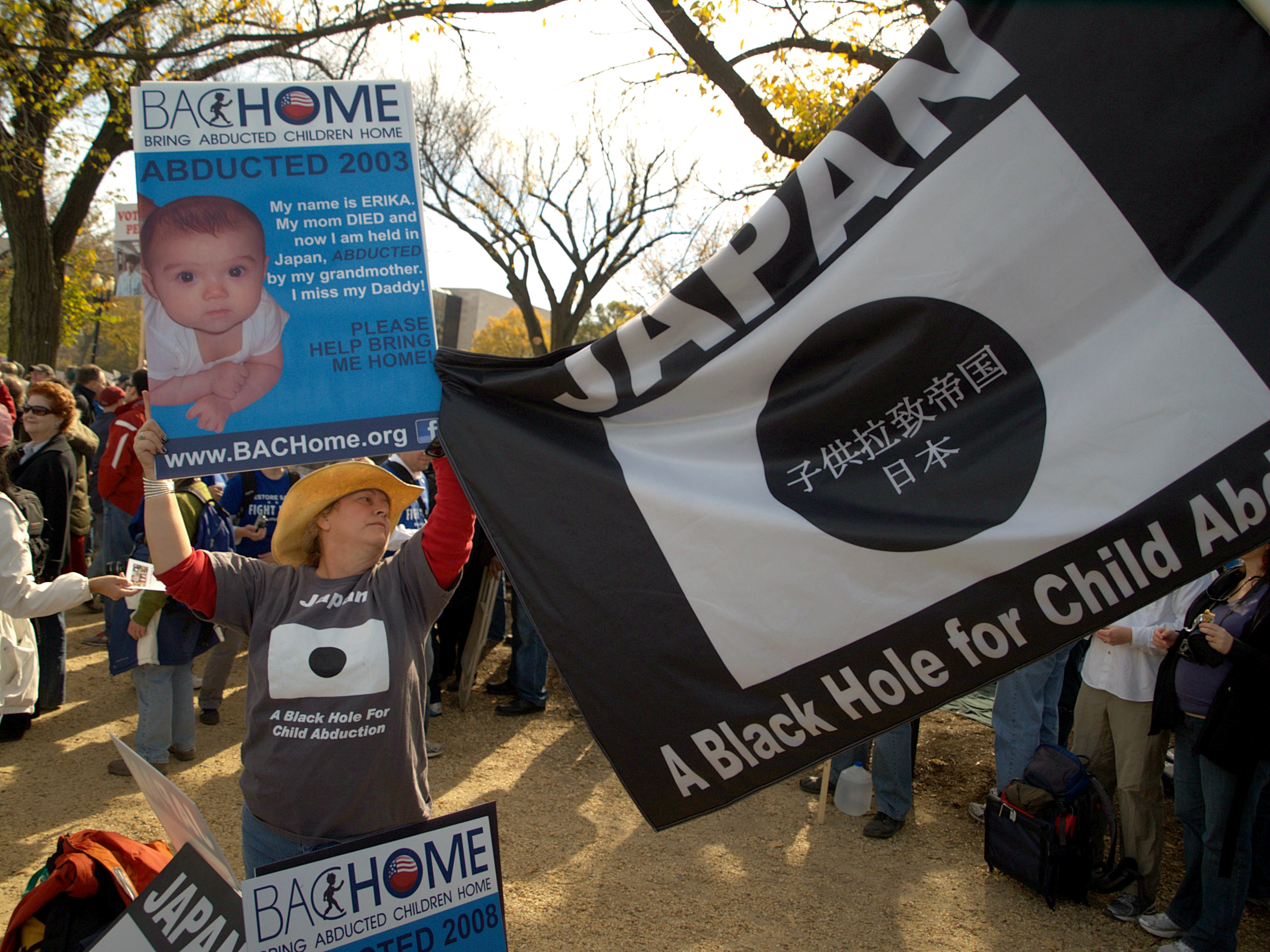
Protesters of abduction of children to Japan at the Rally to Restore Sanity and/or Fear In Washington D.C.

International child abduction in Japan refers to the illegal international abduction or removal of children from their country of habitual residence by an acquaintance or family member to Japan or their retention in Japan in contravention to the law of another country. Most cases involve a Japanese parent taking their children to Japan in defiance of visitation or joint custody orders issued by Western courts. Parental child abduction is a growing problem as the number of international marriages increases.

Japan is a party to the 1980 Hague Convention on the Civil Aspects of International Child Abduction, which obliges signatories to promptly return abducted children to their country of habitual residence. The convention entered into force for Japan on 1 April 2014. The issue had become a cause for significant concern to other parties, the majority of which are Western countries. The National Diet approved ratification to the convention in 2013.

The main impediment to Japan's becoming a party to the convention was that it would require a change in attitude of the legal system towards child custody rights. Japanese family law considers issues of divorce custody, child support or alimony as predominantly private matters. Consequently, Japan has no enforcement mechanism to enforce foreign custody rulings or recommendations made by its own domestic courts. Furthermore, until April 2026, Japan did not recognise joint parental authority or shared "residence" after divorce. As a signatory to the United Nations Convention on the Rights of the Child, however, Japan is supposed to recognize the right of a child to obtain non-custodial parent visitation.

== Parental child abduction in law ==
In some countries, international child abduction is a felony. The US made it so in the International Parental Kidnapping Crime Act of '93. In the United Kingdom the Child Abduction Act 1984 provides that the offence of abduction of a child by a parent is committed only if the child is taken out of the U.K. for a period exceeding one month.

In the case of Japan, CNN quoted an unnamed official in the U.S. Embassy in Tokyo who stated, "Our two nations approach divorce and child-rearing differently. Parental child abduction is not considered a crime in Japan." However, this statement is contradicted by several Japanese news media sources which report arrests involving parental abduction in Japan. The Supreme Court of Japan categorically ruled that a parental abduction in which force and coercion is used to remove child constitutes the felony of kidnapping of a minor irrespective of person's custodial right. The case concerned a couple who were separated but not divorced so the abducting father held joint custody. Therefore, while civil liability (or criminal liability in some countries) for parental abduction arise out of custodial interference of a parent and is not legally defined as kidnapping, in Japan, parental abduction is a kidnapping if it disrupts a child's residence or relationship with the primary caregiver. At the same time Japanese family courts have no enforcement mechanism in civil matters so they strongly encourage parents to engage in mediation in order to agree to custody arrangements on their own and rarely intervene in matters such as visitation and child support which are seen as private.

Furthermore, it is rare for a nation to extradite one of its own citizens to another country for alleged parental abduction. On the other hand, a foreign national parent, trying to re-abduct his/her children in Japan by force, may face arrest and possible criminal prosecution irrespective of his/her custodial status in the children's home country. Moreover, a foreign parent trying to abduct children by force to another country would face the extra charge of "kidnapping for the purpose of transporting the kidnapped person to a foreign country" (Article 226(1) of the Penal Code), which carries the penalty of imprisonment with labor for a limited period of not less than two years.

The law, which was originally designed as an extra penalty for the kidnapping of a minor for sexual slavery in China, is now used for preventing forced abduction from Japan by a parent. This provision of the Penal Code was amended in 2005 so that it covers kidnapping and abduction from any country, not just Japan. This means that it constitutes a criminal offence under Japanese law for a Japanese national to abduct his or her own child by force in another country and bring the child to Japan, and in such cases Japanese police and prosecutors could initiate criminal proceedings.

== International parental abduction statistics ==
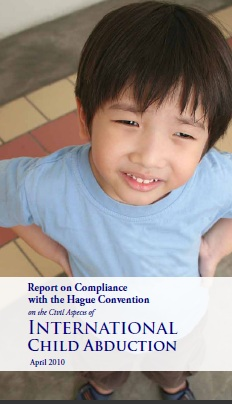
U.S. Department of State - Report on Compliance with the Hague Convention on the Civil Aspects of International Child Abduction - Compliance Report 2010 (pdf) (4,3 MB)

Megumi Nishikawa, a senior writer for the Mainichi newspaper, stated in an editorial that there were nearly 200 cases of such disputes in Japan.

The United States Department of State website states that,

...in cases of international parental child abduction, foreign parents are greatly disadvantaged in Japanese courts, both in terms of obtaining the return of children to the United States, and in achieving any kind of enforceable visitation rights in Japan. The Department of State is not aware of any case in which a child taken from the United States by one parent has been ordered returned to the United States by Japanese courts, even when the left-behind parent has a United States child custody decree.

According to the US Embassy, between 2005 and 2009, the number of child abduction cases of children from Australia, Canada, France, the United Kingdom, and the United States has quadrupled.

=== Australia ===
According to the Australian Embassy in Japan in 2010 there have been thirteen abductions to date. As of January 2007, there were at least thirteen cases of unresolved parental abduction to Japan. Australia, unlike other nations, does not maintain a national database of parental abduction cases. Moreover, media restrictions on family law and juvenile matters mean that many cases go unreported.

=== Canada ===
As of March 2008, there are 29 cases of unresolved parental child abduction to Japan, the highest of any destination country from Canada. In early 2007, there were 31 active cases of child custody and family distress dealt by Canadian Embassy and in 2006, there were 21 active cases.

=== France ===
As of December 2009, there are 35 cases of international parental child abduction of French nationals related to Japan.

=== United Kingdom ===
From 2003 to 2009, the United Kingdom has had 37 cumulative cases of British nationals being abducted to Japan by a parent, none of which have been resolved. For a yearly figure, The Guardian newspaper reported that, for 2008 alone, there are 336 cases and estimated 470 children were abducted from the UK and taken abroad illegally, an increase of 20% from 2005 figures. Pakistan (30 cases) top the list followed by the US (23), Ireland (22) and Spain (21). Other abduction hotspots included Australia, France and Egypt. The cases of international parental abduction are not well published in U.K. due to reporting restrictions that apply to any cases involving the welfare of minors. However, the Guardian provided anecdotal evidence. A reporter attended a day in London family court. Eight out of 14 cases heard involved child abduction, which may indicate that the problem is widespread. 40% (134 out of the 336) of international abductions in 2008 involve countries that are not signatories to the Hague Convention. These include Bangladesh, Russia, Iraq and Nigeria. Moreover, the problem is expected to worsen as immigration and international marriage become common. Moreover, The Independent newspaper cites the Reunite International Child Abduction Centre which claims that 43% of parental abductions involve ethnic minority children taken abroad and often forced to marry. Moreover, cultural complicity, collusion and shame mean that many cases go unreported.

=== United States ===
The U.S. State Department, which enforces the treaty in the U.S., has more than 2,000 active cases in 2009 involving nearly 3,000 children abducted from the U.S. or wrongfully retained abroad. The ten countries with the highest incidence of reported abductions in 2008 are Mexico (316), Canada (57), the United Kingdom (42), Japan (37), India (35), Germany (34), the Dominican Republic (25), Brazil (21), Australia (18), and Colombia (17), which together represent 602 cases out of the total of 776. Japan and India are the only non-signatory countries in this group. However, there has been a significant year by year increase. In 2009, there were 73 outstanding cases involving 104 children who have been abducted to or retained in Japan by parents. An additional 29 cases involve American parties in Japan with one parent denied access to his or her child. However, according to December 2009 figures, there appeared to be 79 child abduction cases involving 100 children. A State Department official stated in 2008 that no child has ever been returned to the US as a result of diplomatic or legal means. Furthermore, embassy officials were only aware of three cases where children have returned to the United States, two involving reconciliation of parents and one in which a 15-year-old escaped to the American embassy.

=== Other nations ===
Justin McCurry of the GlobalPost claimed that the unofficial number of international parental abduction in Japan is much higher if failed marriages between Japanese and people from other Asian countries are included. Quoting Thierry Consigny of the Assembly for French Overseas Nationals (AFE) for Japan and North Asia, he point out that every year 166,000 children are separated from one of their parents in Japan following a divorce or separation, usually definitively, and 10,000 or more children of dual nationality fall into this situation.

== International marriage and divorce in Japan ==
Japan is experiencing a dramatic increase in the number of international marriages between a Japanese and a non-Japanese. In 2007, 40,272 international marriages between a Japanese national and foreigner occurred, representing 5.6% of total marriages (719,822). In 2000, the number was 36,263, and in 1980 the number was only 7,261. This is despite the fact that the foreigners represent only about 1.22% of the total population in Japan. An estimated 20,000 children are born to Japanese-foreign couples every year. The vast majority of these marriages are with Chinese and Koreans, many of whom are second- or third-generation permanent residents of Japan, also known as zainichi, and other neighboring nations such as the Philippines and Thailand. However, the cases of a Japanese woman marrying a foreign national husband, marriage to a U.S. national is high (1,485), ranking second after Korean nationals (2,209), followed by Chinese nationals (1,016).

At the same time, the number of international divorces in Japan is also increasing from 7,716 in 1992 to 18,220 in 2007. International divorces represent 7.15% of the total 254,832 divorces in Japan in 2007. Moreover, according to a 2007 figure, 10.53% of people under 20 experience the divorce of their parents. In 1990, the rate was 5.24%. In numerical terms, 245,685 under-20-year-olds, had experienced the divorce of their parents, compared to 169,624 in 1990. In July 2008, Thierry Consigny of the Assembly for French Overseas Nationals (AFE) for Japan and North Asia, which has been advocating for right of foreign parents in Japan, further asserted that, according to a government survey, every year 166,000 children are separated from one of their parents in Japan following a divorce or separation, usually definitively. Furthermore, 10,000 or more children of dual nationality fall into this situation as well. Foreign parents face an additional obstacle in maintaining access due to their immigration status which may be revoked after a divorce.

== Divorce, custody and visitation in Japan ==
In Japan, according to 2004 data from National Institute of Population and Social Security Research, mothers receive custody in roughly 80 percent of divorces involving children. This is a shift from 1970 which awarded custody to mothers only in 50 percent of cases. Similarly, in the U.S. one source estimates that fathers received sole or joint custody 26 percent of the time while mothers or someone other than the father received sole custody 74 percent of the time.

While the law in some countries, such as France or the United States, provide for joint custody in divorce cases involving children, joint custody was not legally recognized in Japan until 2024, when a new law was passed introducing that concept, effective April 2026. Jeremy D. Morley, an American lawyer who has handled many abduction cases in Japan, has pointed out that the practice of sharing child custody after a divorce is "alien" to Japanese and not found in Japanese culture or history, which may help to explain its previous absence from Japanese law.

Historically, in Japan, when a marriage with children legally dissolves, full parental custody and authority was awarded to only one parent. Moreover, this custody ruling created complete legal separation of the non-custodial parent from his or her biological children. An academic article discussing the work of Takao Tanase, notable legal scholar of comparative study of American and Japanese legal system, asserts that "the real difference lies in the two cultures' diverging conception of social parenthood, and thus of the identity of the person who holds parental rights: the noncustodial American parent remains a legal parent at least in part because he or she remains a social parent, in aspiration if not reality, while the traditional Japanese view is the opposite."

The paper then goes on to describe a Japanese case whereby a father is granted a primary custody of the children after a divorce. A year after the divorce, the father marries another woman. Subsequently, the son from the previous marriage is adopted out without having given any notice to the son's biological mother and, moreover, her subsequent attempt to regain the primary custody of her biological child failed in court. In Japanese law, irrespective of her biological link, her separation from her son was complete at the point of losing the custody. The paper further states that in Japan it is seen as preferable that children make a permanent break with the non-custodial parent because creating a legal "right" for parent would cause conflict damaging to the welfare of the child. The Japan Times states that experts in Japan have been skeptical about the benefits of complete joint custody because the child is tossed back and forth between the parents for their own benefit.

The typical 'deal' in Japan is that, upon divorce, the father pays nothing for the child's support, and he never sees his child. It is noted that the decision by family courts in Japan with regard to both visitation and child support are unenforceable. There are several consequences to this lack of enforcement. At first, the courts strongly prefer that divorcing couples agree to child custody arrangements in mediation. If mediation fails, the court can intervene and has the power to determine which parent shall have parental authority. Article 819 of Japanese Civil Code states that "In the case of judicial divorce, the court shall determine which parent shall have parental authority." The primary custodian, or caregiver, as defined by the Japanese legal system, is the parent who has physical possession of the child at the time the case is initially brought to court in Japan. In other words, the court will likely choose the parent who already has possession. Colin P.A. Jones, a professor at Doshisha Law School, states that parental rights are not recognised in Japanese law, pointing out an academic debate in Japan over whether visitation was a right of the parent or the child or something else. In regard to visitation/access, the Supreme Court held in 2000 that visitation was a right of neither parent nor child.

Consequently, court-mandated visitation in Japan only occurs with the cooperation of the custodial parent. U.S. Department of State website states that "compliance with Family Court rulings is essentially voluntary, which renders any ruling unenforceable unless both parents agree." Consequently, any attempt to obtain visitation (or child support and/or alimony) through legal enforcement would be futile. If the custodial parent, usually the mother, refuses to cooperate with visitation, the other parent, usually the father, will often refuse to pay child support. According to New York City-based international family lawyer Jeremy D. Morley:

A charitable view of the Japanese system of divorce is that it favors a 'clean break' so that the divorced parties have little or nothing more to do with each other after the divorce. A less generous interpretation is that it permits the spouse with economic assets (usually the husband) to keep most of his assets, avoid payment of alimony and provide little or no child support, but the price he pays is the abandonment of any relationship with his children, while the other spouse is punished economically, but keeps her children.

In the 82 signatory countries custody rulings differ by country. While the mother usually gains sole or primary custody, there is an increasing trend in other developed countries to shift to shared parenting and joint custody. Enforcement of custody orders is also an issue in those countries that usually award sole or primary custody, as it is in Japan. In the UK, fathers' rights groups have advocated for changes to the Child Support Act including child support, shared parenting and access to children, and lack of enforcement of court orders.

Citizens of the European Union have lobbied the European Parliament to take action against child abduction by Japanese parents post-divorce and for being denied access to their children. On 8 July 2020, lawmakers of the European Union adopted a non-binding resolution calling Japan to enforce domestic and foreign court decisions pertaining the return of children, parental access and visitation rights. This also emboldened divorced Japanese parents who lost access to their children to discuss the issue. The LDP's judiciary research commission responded that Japan should study other countries for alternatives to single-parent child custody.

=== Koseki issue ===
Moreover, something that is somewhat unusual in Japanese custody arrangements is the system of koseki, which legally defines households and persons' legal identity in Japanese law. When a non-Japanese marries a Japanese, the foreign spouse's name is recorded into Japanese spouse's koseki upon filing of the marriage, but the spouse's entry is not created in the koseki because of lack of Japanese citizenship. When their child is born, because the child has Japanese citizenship, an entry is created for the child in the Japanese spouse's koseki. There is a widespread misunderstanding that when a divorce occurs, the foreign spouse is removed from the koseki and the children's custody is automatically kept by the Japanese spouse who hold the koseki. Koseki and custody are not related. The confusion is increased by the fact that completely uncontested divorces are performed not by a court, but by the spouses simply filling out a family registry form at the city hall.

When a divorce is finalized at the city hall, the name of the custodial parent of each child must be written in the filing. The name of the custodial parent is then recorded in each child's entry in the koseki. Therefore, it is wrong to assume that unless custody is litigated in Japan, the Japanese parent will automatically hold custody of children in Japan, irrespective of the ruling of the foreign court. A divorce is not finalized in Japan unless custody is agreed to by the spouses or determined by the Japanese court.

Furthermore, it is also wrong, but common, to assume that if the custodial parent dies, custody of the child is transferred within the koseki, which would mean that custody would be retained by the dead spouse's new married partner or Japanese grandparents who retain their custody as primary caregiver and would not be transferred to the surviving parent. When a sole custodial parent dies, the family court starts the procedure of appointing a guardian unless one has been designated in the will of the custodial parent.

== The Hague Child Abduction Convention ==
Hague Abduction Convention Parties

Japan became a party to the Hague Child Abduction Convention in January 2014. It entered into force on 1 April of that same year. Japan was the last G7 nation, to become a party to the convention. Many of the 97 parties to the convention are Western nations of Europe, North America, South America and Australia while most countries in Africa, Asia and the Middle East are not parties of the convention.

Between parties, children who were abducted are required to be sent back to their "habitual residence" after the abduction takes place. For nations which define such abductions as felonies, Interpol can issue notices, and the abducting parent can be arrested during international travel. The Convention does not demand that any country recognize the ruling of a family court in other countries, which is part of the Hague Protection of Children Convention. Rather, the convention demands that signatories recognize and promptly return abducted children to their habitual residence.

Since the treaty has no retroactive effect, abductions before 2014 involving Japan cannot be resolved on the basis of the Hague convention. Rather, remedies must be sought under Japanese family law to enforce visitation orders. However, the convention has an important section that is not limited to children abducted after ratification, its Article 21, which lets parents in another country apply "to make arrangements for organising or securing the effective exercise of rights of access" and get help from both countries' governments to do that. Article 21 cases are not just for abducted children and are subject to few or none of the conditions or defenses that can block a petition for return of the child.

=== Japanese support for the convention ===
In a joint symposium on child abduction held at the Canadian Embassy in Tokyo in 2006, Jun Yokoyama, a Hitotsubashi University professor specializing in international private law observed that Japan did not need to join the Hague Convention when it took effect in 1980 because of the low number of international marriages at the time, which is no longer the case in the present situation. Similarly, a spokesman from the Ministry of Foreign Affairs said that the Ministry was not opposed to the convention, but that "at present there is not enough support from Japanese nationals".

In 2008, Japan Today had reported that, by 2010, Japan would become a signatory of the convention. However, this report later proved to be inaccurate. The 2009 election saw the Democratic Party of Japan gain power. Yukio Hatoyama stated in an interview,

My heart goes out to the fathers and mothers. There are cases of mothers as well. We support ratifying and enforcing the Hague Convention, and involved in this is a sweeping change to allow divorced fathers visitation of their children. That issue affects not just foreign national fathers, but Japanese fathers as well. I believe in this change.

However Hatoyama resigned as Prime Minister before any such change was implemented. Commentators noted that signing the treaty would not retroactively affect previous child-abduction cases in Japan.

In a similar joint symposium held at the American Embassy in May 2009, embassy officials from Canada, France, the UK, and the US issued a joint statement calling on Japan to sign the Hague Convention. Following the Christopher Savoie incident (see "Specific Cases"), a near identical statement was reissued in October 2009 with additional support from Australia, Italy, New Zealand and Spain. In a 2009 statement, Foreign Minister Katsuya Okada said that Japan was considering being a signatory, stating that "we are approaching the matter with an open mind, but we must also take public opinion into account."

One major obstacle, noted by Jeremy Morley, an attorney who had worked on parental child abduction cases in Japan, was that Japanese family law did not align to the parameters of the Hague Convention and that new legislation would need to be introduced for Japan's signature and ratification. Hans van Loon, Secretary General of the Hague Convention on Private International Law, pointed out that "Japanese civil law stresses that in cases where custody cannot be reached by agreement between the parents, the Japanese Family Court will resolve the issue based on the best interest of the child. However, compliance with Family Court rulings is essentially voluntary, which renders any ruling unenforceable unless both parents agree." Yuko Nishitani, an associate professor at Tohoku University and director of the Hague Academy of International Law, agreed, saying that "the real reason Japan has not signed the Hague Convention is that no enforcement mechanism exists in the country. Signing the convention would expose these flaws." An official of Ministry of Foreign Affairs stated, "The Japanese government's position is 'not interfering in civil affairs.'"

At the time, any introduction of prerequisite legislation which would alter Japanese family court law would take at least a year in committee discussion and draft legislation could have been introduced in 2011 at the earliest or possibly later which would delay signature of the treaty to later than 2011 to allow for legislative change. Providing administration and judicial authorities to implement effective enforcement measures as required by the Convention presented the main impediment for Japan signing the convention. The Japanese government eventually established a Vice-Ministerial-level work group to study the proposal as to whether to ratify the convention.

In 2014, Japan became a party to the Hague Convention. Since then the treaty has had an impact in over 150 cases.

=== Domestic violence ===
Japan has argued that becoming a signatory of the convention may not protect Japanese women and their children from abusive non-Japanese husbands. According to an editorial from the Asahi Shimbun, a significant number of parental abduction cases filed in North America and Europe involve Japanese wives, and of those wives a number of them claim their husbands were abusive.

Kensuke Onuki, a prominent Japanese lawyer who handles many international divorces, was reported as saying he opposes Japan signing the convention and claims that "[i]n over 90 percent of cases in which the Japanese women return to Japan, the man is at fault, such as with domestic violence and child abuse," but admits that "domestic violence is difficult to prove."Most child abductions by Japanese women are a result of spousal violence. ‹ Japan Today: Japan News and Discussion Attorney Mikiko Otani, an expert on family law who ultimately supports joining the Hague Convention, also expressed her reservation, saying that the convention is based on the principle of returning the child and only in very extreme violent cases has the Article 13 defense been successfully invoked. On the other hand, Colin Jones of Doshisha University, while accepting that domestic abuse defense in the convention is inadequate, nevertheless argued that if Japan signed the convention, abducting mothers would more than likely resort to this defense successfully to avoid their children being returned because Japanese family court is heavily biased in favor of the mother.

Domestic violence was also noted as an issue of concern amongst signatory countries in 2009. The Special Commission of the Hague Convention stated in its report that two-thirds of the abductions are committed by the child's primary caretakers, usually mothers, and that this is "giving rise to issues which had not been foreseen by the drafters of the Convention".

Merle H. Weiner in the Fordham Law Review pointed out that there was widespread media attention in the US during the late 1970s and early 1980s about international child abduction where the typical abductor was a foreign non-custodial male who abducted children from their primary caregiver. According to Weiner, this stereotype dominated the U.S. Congressional proceeding for ratification and resulted in a presumption in the US that abduction is always harmful to children. The Hague Convention makes no mention of domestic violence as a defense. Due to the focus on promoting return of children to their habitual residence, "the domestic violence victim's ability to defeat a Hague Convention application for the return of their child, if possible at all, often turns more on fortuity and the judge's sympathy than on any principled rule of law." The Australian delegate to the Hague Convention commission stated that:

There is concern that the Convention is now being used by abusive (usually male) parents to seek the return of children and primary carers back to the country of habitual residence and that the Convention is moving away from what it was meant to deter. Recent statistics demonstrate that the majority of abducting parents are women, often those fleeing situation[s] of abuse and domestic violence. There is also growing concerns regarding the correlation between incidents of child abduction and the presence of domestic violence and that the Convention does not give due consideration and sufficient weight to such mitigating circumstances in the context of a "grave risk" argument.

There are cases where, if the child is returned, the abductor will not or cannot return with the child out of safety concerns. One of the crucial problems is that, upon return to the foreign country, abducting parents lack resources to hire a lawyer to obtain protective measures against domestic violence. Another concern regarding signing the treaty is the possibility that implementing it would, in practice, "tear the child away from a parent", as a primary caregiver would be unable to accompany the children to countries which have criminalized parental abduction. Colin Jones, a law professor of Doshisha University, commented that "[w]hatever the law says, it is very hard to imagine it being in the interests of the police and prosecutors to be seen taking crying half-Japanese children away from distraught Japanese mothers."

=== United Nations Convention on the Rights of the Child ===
Japan is a signatory to the UN Convention on the Rights of the Child, which enumerates the fundamental civil, political, economic, social and cultural rights of children. There are a number of articles that deal indirectly or directly with child abduction in the convention and demonstrate the violations of children's rights that frequently occur during international child abductions:

Articles 7 and 8 of the Convention protect a child's right to a name and a nationality.

Article 9 protects a child's right to not be separated from his or her parents against their will and to maintain personal relations and direct contact with both parents on a regular basis, except when competent authorities subject to judicial review determine, in accordance with applicable law and procedures, that such separation is necessary for the best interests of the child.

In accordance with Article 9, Article 10 stipulates that applications for international travel for purposes of family unification be dealt with in a positive, humane and expeditious manner and that the submission of such a request shall entail no adverse consequences for the applicants and for the members of their family.

Articles 11 and 35 specifically exhort state parties to take all appropriate national, bilateral and multilateral measures to combat the illicit transfer and non-return of children abroad and promote the conclusion of bilateral or multilateral agreements or accession to existing agreements and measures to prevent the abduction of children.

== Film ==
From the Shadows at IMDb is a 2013 documentary film about child abduction by parents and relatives in Japan. Produced and co-directed by David Hearn and Matt Antel, the film focuses on several cases. One is Murray Wood, a Canadian father, whose two children were taken by their Japanese mother.

A Missing Part is a 2024 movie about a French taxi-driver working in Tokyo trying to find his daughter that his Japanese partner abducted 9 years before.

== See also ==
- Law of Japan
- Criminal justice system of Japan
- Ethnic issues in Japan
- Human rights in Japan
- Gaijin - Xenophobia
- Hague Abduction Convention Compliance Reports
- International child abduction in the United States
- Japanese diaspora
- Multiracial
- Nationality law
