= International Parental Kidnapping Crime Act =

- Long title: An Act to amend title 18, United States Code, with respect to parental kidnapping, and for other purposes.
- Acronyms (colloquial): IPKCA
- Nicknames: International Parental Kidnapping Crime Act of 1993
- Enacted by: the 103rd United States Congress
- Effective: December 2, 1993

Citations
- Public law: 103-173
- Statutes at Large: 107 Stat. 1998

Codification
- Titles amended: 18 U.S.C.: Crimes and Criminal Procedure
- U.S.C. sections created: 18 U.S.C. ch. 55 § 1204
- U.S.C. sections amended: 18 U.S.C. ch. 55 § 1201 et seq.

Legislative history
- Introduced in the House as H.R. 3378 by George Gekas (R–PA) on October 27, 1993; Committee consideration by House Judiciary; Passed the House on November 20, 1993 (Passed voice vote); Passed the Senate on November 20, 1993 (Passed voice vote); Signed into law by President William J. Clinton on December 2, 1993

The International Parental Kidnapping Crime Act 1993 (IPKCA) is a United States federal law. H.R. 3378, approved December 2, was assigned Public Law No. 103-173 and signed as Public Law 103-322 by President Bill Clinton on September 2, 1993. This law makes it a federal crime to remove a child from the United States or retain a child outside the United States with the intent to obstruct a parent's custodial rights, or to attempt to do so (See 18 U.S.C. § 1204.) This crime is punishable by up to three years in prison. The law provides an affirmative defense where the abducting parent acted pursuant to a valid court order obtained under the Uniform Child Custody Jurisdiction And Enforcement Act, or where the abducting parent was fleeing domestic violence, or where the failure to return the child resulted from circumstances beyond the taking parent's control and the taking parent made reasonable efforts to notify the left behind parent within 24 hours and returned the child as soon as possible. Since its enactment, the law has only been used in a very small minority of international child abduction cases prompting parents of internationally abducted children to claim an abuse of or prosecutorial discretion on the part of federal prosecutors.

== Enforcement ==
It was reported in 1999 that in five years, 62 indictments and 13 convictions resulted from thousands of international child abduction cases. The Justice Department said it rarely pursues prosecutions under the IPKCA, because its prosecutors assume a U.S. indictment will prevent children from being returned. Speaking to a group of concerned parents at a 1999 Congressional hearing on international child abduction, Senator Strom Thurmond of South Carolina, who was the chairman of the Senate Judiciary subcommittee on Criminal Justice Oversight, said, "The law is rarely used. The [Clinton] administration discouraged the Congress from passing this statute, which is evident from the department's reluctance to enforce it,"

== Signing statement ==
In his signing statement Clinton remarked:

Today I have signed into law H.R. 3378, the "International Parental Kidnapping Crime Act of 1993." This legislation underscores the seriousness with which the United States regards international child abduction. It makes this crime, for the first time, a Federal felony offense.

H.R. 3378 recognizes that the international community has created a mechanism to promote the resolution of international parental kidnapping by civil means. This mechanism is the Hague Convention on the Civil Aspects of International Child Abduction. H.R. 3378 reflects the Congress' awareness that the Hague Convention has resulted in the return of many children and the Congress' desire to ensure that the creation of a Federal child abduction felony offense does not and should not interfere with the Convention's continued successful operation.

This Act expresses the sense of the Congress that proceedings under the Hague Convention, where available, should be the "option of first choice" for the left-behind parent. H.R. 3378 should be read and used in a manner consistent with the Congress' strong expressed preference for resolving these difficult cases, if at all possible, through civil remedies.

William J. Clinton

== Case law ==
IPKCA has been subject to various challenges on the basis of the law's very constitutionality to criminalize international conduct and on the interpretation of the law in the context of existing US law.

=== Constitutionality ===
U.S. v. Cummings, C.A.9 (Wash.) 2002, 281 F.3d 1046, certiorari denied 123 S.Ct. 179, 537 U.S. 895, 154 L.Ed.2d 162. Commerce 82.6

U.S. v. Alahmad, C.A.10 (Colo.) 2000, 211 F.3d 538, certiorari denied 121 S.Ct. 782, 531 U.S. 1080, 148 L.Ed.2d 679. Constitutional Law 3781

U.S. v. Amer, C.A.2 (N.Y.) 1997, 110 F.3d 873, certiorari denied 118 S.Ct. 258, 522 U.S. 904, 139 L.Ed.2d 185. Constitutional Law 1414

U.S. v. Shahani-Jahromi, E.D.Va.2003, 286 F.Supp.2d 723. Commerce 82.6

U.S. v. Fazal, D.Mass.2002, 203 F.Supp.2d 33.

=== Parental rights ===
U.S. v. Shahani-Jahromi, E.D.Va.2003, 286 F.Supp.2d 723. Constitutional Law 4509(16)

U.S. v. Alahmad, D.Colo.1998, 28 F.Supp.2d 1273.

U.S. v. Al-Ahmad, D.Colo.1998, 996 F.Supp. 1055.

=== Weight and sufficiency of evidence ===
U.S. v. Al-Ahmad, D.Colo.1998, 996 F.Supp. 1055.

U.S. v. Dallah, C.A.10 (Okla.) 2006, 192 Fed.Appx. 725, 2006 WL 2294848, Unreported.

=== Sentence ===
U.S. v. Dallah, C.A.10 (Okla.) 2006, 192 Fed.Appx. 725, 2006 WL 2294848, Unreported.

== See also ==
- International child abduction
- Hague Abduction Convention
- United States Hague Abduction Convention Compliance Reports
- International child abduction in Mexico
- Unlawful Flight to Avoid Prosecution
- Uniform Child Abduction Prevention Act
- Uniform Child Custody Jurisdiction And Enforcement Act
