= Uniform Child Abduction Prevention Act =

The Uniform Child Abduction Prevention Act ("UCAPA") is a Uniform Act drafted by the National Conference of Commissioners on Uniform State Laws (NCCUSL) and submitted for enactment by jurisdictions within the United States in 2006. This uniform law originated by the parents of internationally abducted children, and parents fearing their children would be abducted.

The act provides States with a valuable tool for deterring both domestic and international child abductions by parents and any persons acting on behalf of the parents. Recognizing that most States have already developed substantial bodies of law regarding child custody determinations and enforcement, including specifically the Uniform Child Custody Jurisdiction and Enforcement Act (UCCJEA), the NCCUSL drafted UCAPA to be compatible with and to augment existing state law.

Under UCAPA, an action for abduction prevention measures may be brought either by a court on its own motion, by a party to a child-custody determination or an individual with a right to seek such a determination, or by a prosecutor or public attorney. The party seeking the abduction prevention measures must file a petition with the court specifying the risk factors for abduction as well as other biographical information including the name, age and gender of the child, the current address of the child and the person against whom the measures are sought, a statement regarding any prior actions related to abduction or domestic violence, a statement addressing any prior arrests for domestic violence or child abuse by either party, and finally any additional information required by existing State child custody law including the UCCJEA.

UCAPA sets out a variety of factors in determining whether there is a credible risk a child will be abducted. If a court determines that a credible risk exists that the child will be abducted, it may then enter an order containing provisions and measures meant to prevent abduction. The act lists a number of specific measures that a court may order. These include imposing travel restrictions, prohibiting the individual from removing the child from the State or other set geographic area, placing the child's name in the United States Department of State's Child Passport Issuance Alert Program, or requiring the individual to obtain an order from a foreign country containing identical terms to the child-custody determination. An abduction prevention order is effective until the earliest of the order's expiration, the child's emancipation, the child's 18th birthday, or until the order is modified, revoked, or vacated.

If abduction appears imminent, a court may issue a warrant to take physical custody of the child, direct law enforcement officers to take steps to locate and return the child, or exercise other appropriate powers under existing state laws. A warrant to take physical custody is enforceable in the enacting state even if issued by different state. The court may authorize law enforcement officers to enter private property, or even to make a forcible entry at any hour, if the circumstances so warrant. Nevertheless, the person on whom the warrant is being executed must be served with the warrant when or immediately after the child is taken into custody and the person must be afforded a hearing no later than the next judicial day or the next possible judicial day if the next day is impossible.

Up to date legislative activity on UCAPA can be found here.

== Risk factors ==
UCAPA sets out a wide variety of factors that should be considered in determining whether there is a credible risk that a child will be abducted. These factors include overt signs such as previous abductions, attempts to abduct the child, or threats of abduction, as well as signs of general abuse including domestic violence, negligence, or refusal to obey a child-custody determination. The act also includes a wide range of activities that may indicate a planned abduction including abandoning employment, liquidating assets, obtaining travel documents or travel tickets, or requesting the child's school or medical records.

The act also addresses the special problems involved with international child abduction by including several risk factors specifically related to international abduction. In particular, the act requires courts to consider whether the party in question is likely to take a child to a country that isn't a party to the Hague Convention on the Civil Aspects of International Child Abduction, or to a country that places the child at risk, has laws that would restrict access to the child, that is on the current list of state sponsors of terrorism, or is engaged in an active military action or war. In addition, a court will consider issues related to citizenship such as a recent change in citizenship status or a denial of United States Citizenship.

== States that have adopted UCAPA ==
UCAPA has so far been adopted by 20 states and the District of Columbia. The adopters, in alphabetical order, are Alabama, Colorado, The District of Columbia, Florida, Kansas, Louisiana, Maryland, Michigan, Mississippi, Nebraska, Nevada, New Mexico, North Carolina, North Dakota, Oklahoma, Pennsylvania, South Carolina, South Dakota, Tennessee, Utah and Wyoming.

=== Louisiana ===
Louisiana made several modifications when adopting UCAPA.

==== Louisiana Modifications ====
Louisiana inserted the word "INTERNATIONAL" into the state's version of the Child Abduction Prevention Act.

Louisiana modified the bill to delete application of the Act between states, with an intent to limit application to non-Hague Convention countries.

Louisiana modified the application of the risk factors from being considered singly to requiring that a judge to consider all statutory factors.

== Introduced bills to adopt UCAPA ==
=== Missouri ===
House Bill 1888 was introduced in 2026 by Rep. Hausman.

=== New Hampshire ===
House Bill 1710 was introduced in 2026 by Rep. Jay Markell. Representatives Bob Lynn, Jodi Nelson, Mark Pearson, Melissa Litchfield, and Debra DeSimone joined as co-sponsors.

=== West Virginia ===
Senate Bill 2 was introduced in 2026 by Sen. Mike Oliverio. Senators Vince Deeds, Michael Woelfel, and Jack Woodrum joined as co-sponsors.

== See also ==
- International Parental Kidnapping Crime Act
- International child abduction
- Hague Convention on the Civil Aspects of International Child Abduction
