= International child abduction in Brazil =

International child abduction in Brazil comprises cases in which the removal of a child by one of the joint holders of custody or non-custodial or contested parents to Brazil in contravention of other laws of other countries and/or the desires of other custody claimants. The phenomenon of international child abduction is defined in international law and legislated on by the Hague Convention on the Civil Aspects of International Child Abduction, which entered into force in Brazil on January 1, 2000, and aims to trace abducted children, secure their prompt return to the country of habitual residence and organize or secure effective rights of access. In 2010 Brazil was accused by the US State Department of being non-compliant with the Hague Convention.

The International Centre for Missing & Exploited Children (ICMEC), a nonprofit global organization that combats child sexual exploitation, child pornography, and child abduction, has a regional presence in Brazil.

Flag of Brazil

== Brazilian non-compliance with the Hague Convention ==
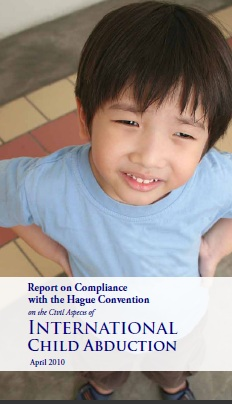
U.S. Department of State - Report on Compliance with the Hague Convention on the Civil Aspects of International Child Abduction - Compliance Report 2010 (pdf) (4,3 MB)

Articles 12 and 13

Accusations that Brazil does not comply with the Hague Convention hinge on conflicting interpretations of Article 12 and Article 13 of the convention. According to Article 12, "The judicial or administrative authority, even where the proceedings have been commenced after the expiration of the period of one year […] shall also order the return of the child, unless it is demonstrated that the child is now settled in its new environment," It is the second part of this article that is used as a defence in all Hague disputes in Brazil and one of the reasons why they are held up for so long. Brazilian federal courts routinely accept evidence from Brazilian abducting parents to the effect that the abducted child has become settled in his/her new environment and the U.S. State Department has claimed that Brazilian Courts erroneously treat Hague cases as custody disputes, unnecessarily delaying cases and demonstrating an unfair bias toward Brazilian citizens, especially mothers. In addition to this, Article 13 of the Convention states, "The judicial or administrative authority may also refuse to order the return of the child if it finds that the child objects to being returned and has attained an age and degree of maturity at which it is appropriate to take account of its views," while Article 13(b) states that children should not be returned to their habitual residence if "there is a grave risk that his or her return would expose the child to physical or psychological harm or otherwise place the child in an intolerable situation." Brazilian abducting parents often present evidence to the court in the form of statements from the abducted child to the effect that they wish to stay in Brazil. A 1999 report by Prof. Nigel Lowe of the Cardiff University Centre for International Family Law Studies in the U.K. raised concerns about children not being returned to their place of habitual residence because of a misunderstanding of what the term 'habitual residence' meant (i.e., rather than referring to restoration of the status quo ante the abduction, abducting parents argue that it refers to the status quo and they are more likely to be able to argue this point if they can delay the judicial process long enough). Lowe states, "courts need also to consider any undue parental influence on the child, either through deliberate indoctrination by the abducting parent or simply by the natural inclination of many children to support a present parent against an absent parent." The report stresses that abducted children's wishes should not override the spirit and the intent of the convention and implies that the part of Article 13 that affirm "The judicial or administrative authority may also refuse to order the return of the child if it finds that the child objects to being returned and has attained an age and degree of maturity at which it is appropriate to take account of its views." should be considered null and void by making that part of the Article not have any use, because for children to be considered to have the maturity to decide where they want to be they should have reached the age of 16 - the cut-off point for Hague Convention cases.

The slowness of the Brazilian judicial process and the checks and balances built into the post-military-dictatorship Constitution of Brazil as a means of safeguarding human rights also create a long appeals process which means that once a child is abducted to Brazil it is likely that he/she will remain there in cases that the judges feel that this is the best solution for the child until they reach the res judicata. The hierarchical position of international conventions in the Brazilian legal system is less than the Constitution of Brazil and can not contradict it, which means that in cases where it is alleged that the convention is contrary to a constitutional principle, the convention may not be applied in whole.

The U.S. Department of State 2008 Report on Compliance with the Hague Convention says: "Brazil continued to demonstrate patterns of noncompliance with the Convention in its judicial performance. The USCA notes several instances during FY 2007 in which Brazilian courts treated Convention cases as custody decisions, rather than applying the principles of wrongful removal or retention laid out in the Convention. In two cases, Brazilian judges refused returns to the United States, citing the "best interests of the child" in accordance with Article 227 of the Constitution of Brazil. These decisions contradict the convention, because the concept in the Brazilian legal system of "best Interests of the Child" is broader than the narrow concept described in the convention, as the Preamble of the Convention declares that the interest of children is attained through their return to their country of habitual residence. In addition, the USCA notes that judges in some cases continued to demonstrate a bias towards mothers and towards Brazilian citizens. Further, the judicial process is excessively lengthy, with cases going on well beyond the six weeks mandated by the convention."

The U.S. Department of State 2009 Report on Compliance with the Hague Convention states: "In FY 2008, Brazil demonstrated patterns of noncompliance with the Convention in the areas of Central Authority performance and judicial performance. The Brazilian courts continue to show a troubling trend of treating Convention cases as custody decisions, and often deny Convention applications upon finding that the children have become "adapted to Brazilian culture." It takes many months before a court receives a case to analyze and many more months before a court issues a decision. Brazil's courts exhibit widespread patterns of bias towards Brazilian mothers in Convention cases. Brazilian courts continue to be amenable to considering evidence relevant to custody determinations but not relevant to the criteria to be applied in a Convention case."

The U.S. Department of State 2010 Report on Compliance with the Hague Convention states: "During the reporting period, the United States experienced continued problems with Brazil's compliance with the Convention. As a result, the USCA finds Brazil not compliant with the Convention in FY 2009. Continued compliance failures result from significant delays within the Brazilian judiciary, which continued to handle applications for return under the Convention as routine custody cases. Article 16 of the Convention specifically prohibits judges from considering the merits of the custody dispute between the parents."

== Complaints by European countries ==
On October 19, 2010, the French MEP, Michele Striffler, tabled a question in the European Parliament on Brazil's refusal to abide by its international treaties in this regard: The Convention on the Civil Aspects of International Child Abduction, of 25 October 1980, known as the Hague Convention, seeks to guarantee the immediate return of children unlawfully removed or retained by one of their parents in a contracting State. It also seeks to ensure that the custody, visitation and accommodation rights of children in contracting States are respected. Under Article 3, the removal abroad of a child by a parent is considered unlawful when it takes place in violation of the custody rights granted to the other parent, or to any institution or body, under the laws of the State in which the child normally resided before being removed. Furthermore, the Hague Convention lays down a simple and swift procedure for resolving the removal of minors outside their country of usual residence, without exhaustive examination of the dispute between the parents. Rulings on the custody of such children can only be issued by a judge in the child's usual place of residence Moreover, a best practice guide has been drawn up by the Hague Permanent Office (responsible for monitoring implementation of the convention), to avoid disparities in the scope and level of services offered by the various central authorities entrusted with the task of enforcing the convention. Nevertheless, the legal systems in numerous States which have signed the Hague Convention (in particular the Brazilian legal authorities) continue to consider these cases as child custody disputes, in flagrant contravention of the letter and spirit of the convention, thereby significantly delaying the implementation of its provisions and the resolution of disputes. It should be borne in mind that these displaced children are the main victims in such situations. Their prolonged removal has serious psychological repercussions which may dramatically affect their future lives. There are many unresolved cases involving European children who have been taken to third countries which are signatories to the convention (particularly Brazil) and whose return is being obstructed by poor application of the convention. What measures does the Council intend to take to ensure that third countries, in particular Brazil, comply with the convention, with a view to putting an end to these unacceptable situations and securing the swift return of abducted children?

== The Brazilian Central Authority ==
The Special Secretariat for Human Rights (Portuguese:Secretaria Especial dos Direitos Humanos, or "SEDH"), which is part of the Brazilian Ministry of Justice, has been designated as the Brazilian central authority as per Article 6 of the Hague Convention, making it responsible for the operation of the Convention in Brazil. Article 7 of the Convention states, "Central Authorities shall co-operate with each other and promote co-operation amongst the competent authorities in their respective States to secure the prompt return of children and to achieve the other objects of this Convention," and lists the measures that they are supposed to take in order to achieve these ends. SEDH is required, therefore, to discover the whereabouts of the abducted child and prevent further harm by taking provisional measures, to secure a voluntary return or to bring about an amicable resolution of the issues, to provide information of a general character as to the law of their State in connection with the application of the convention, to initiate or facilitate the institution of judicial or administrative proceedings with a view to obtaining the return of the child, to make arrangements for organizing rights of access. SEDH is also required to provide or facilitate the provision of legal aid and advice, including the participation of legal counsel and advisors, to provide such administrative arrangements as may be necessary and appropriate to secure the safe return of the child and to keep each other informed with respect to the operation of the Convention and, as far as possible, to eliminate any obstacles to its application.

SEDH is directed by Patricia de Teixera Lamego Soares, a law school graduate with a master's degree in international affairs from George Washington University in the U.S. According to a March 2009 report, Patricia Soares is adamant about keeping a low profile personally and for parents involved in international abduction cases. She is described as working with a tight, highly focused team of five people and is "respected for the assurance with which she accomplishes delicate tasks and stays cool under pressure."

According to left-behind parents, though, SEDH has displayed major shortcomings in several areas(see cases below) while the U.S.State Department and the Lowe report argue that it is in Brazilian courts that there is a widespread pattern of bias in favor of Brazilian abducting parents in Convention cases (see section on Brazilian non-compliance with the Hague Convention), rather than there being any failings on the part of the SEDH. Brazilian family courts continue to show a willingness to consider evidence in order to determine custody but not relevant to the criteria to be applied in a Convention case, including looking at what solution is in the 'best interests' of the child. The US State Department's concerns about law enforcement performance are related to the judiciary's poor performance. Often, courts will determine that an abducted child should remain with the abducting parent in Brazil because he has 'adapted to Brazilian culture' or because of the length of time that has passed. Both of these reasons are based on logical fallacies and neither is admissible under the convention. Additionally, it is argued that in Brazil law enforcement appears to give lower priority to Convention cases because wrongful retention of a child is not a criminal offense under the Brazilian penal code.

The Coordinator of SEDH visited the US Department of State for a full week in November 2009 to review long-standing cases involving the abduction of US children. During this trip, she and Brazilian Embassy officials met with the parents of children kidnapped and taken to Brazil, NGOs, members of the US Congress and a federal judge who works on Hague Convention cases. The coordinator explained in detail resolutions made by the Brazilian Supreme Court and SEDH's outreach and education campaign to address Brazilian judges' lack of familiarity with the convention and the supreme court's resolutions.

== Role of corruption in child abduction in Brazil ==
Requests of Brazilian central authority, SEDH, to law enforcement agencies to locate missing children are rarely followed up on. According to Transparency International's 2009 report, Brazil ranked 75th out of 180 countries in terms of the degree of corruption that its own citizens ascribed to it. The country's low ranking was attributed to poor governance, weak institutions and excessive interference by private interests in the judicial process

The Brazilian judiciary is commonly viewed as unresponsive and has even been described as a 'black box' by President Luiz Inácio Lula da Silva. Poor citizens are often unable to obtain justice because they are unable to access legal services and this applies equally, if not more, to foreign parents fighting to have their children returned. Amnesty International claims that corruption continues to undermine access to justice in Brazil, reporting a 2009 corruption investigation in which federal police arrested the president of the Supreme Court of Espírito Santo, along with judges, lawyers and a member of the prosecution service, for alleged involvement in the selling of judicial decisions.

The US Department of State reports that the Brazilian legal system is 'complex and overburdened' and that state-level courts are often subject to political and economic influence. Although there are provisions in place to ensure the formal independence of judges, and the broad functional and structural autonomy is guaranteed by the constitution, a 2009 report by Freedom House relates that judicial reform in Brazil has been slower than in other countries in Latin America because the judiciary uses its formal independence to resist change and stop investigations into judicial corruption. The general image of the Brazilian judiciary is one of impunity and inefficiency. The National Justice Council (Portuguese:Conselho Nacional de Justiça) is currently the only external judicial control mechanism, but Transparency International suggests a potential lack of independence even in this body, since it is made up of judges. Many in Brazil perceive the NJC to be no more than window dressing since its decisions can be annulled by the judiciary itself. Relentless political corruption in Brazil is further aggravated by partial immunity protecting high-ranking public servants. Under Brazil's 1988 Constitution, only the Supreme Court has jurisdiction over the president, ministers, legislators and high court justices so the decision makers in the Brazilian judicial system are under no pressure to abide by international law.

Despite economic growth in terms of GDP in recent years, Brazil remains a country with extremes of wealth distribution and inequalities. According to a 2008 BBC report, the rich have benefited the most while the country's new-found wealth has not trickled down to the poor. It is to the richer sectors of Brazilian society that children are invariably abducted and it is in these sectors that abducting parents have access to the corrupt networks and are able to employ the jeitinho to greater effect. According to David L Levy of the Children's Rights Council, Brazil disregards Hague when it comes to its own nationals, especially well to do, well-connected ones. Legal experts in international Hague proceedings refer to this Brazilian practice as: "State Sponsored Child Abduction."

== Reciprocity ==
The Hague Conference on Private International Law reports the case of a Brazilian woman and a Swiss man, the parents of two children born in Brazil in 1997 and 1999 who separated in 2004, but all continued to live in Brazil. In May 2006 the father abducted the children to Switzerland. On 10 October 2006 the local court in Switzerland ordered that the children be returned to Brazil. On 18 December the Swiss court of appeal upheld this order. The father then issued a legal challenge with both the federal tribunal and the Swiss supreme court. The order to return the children to Brazil was upheld on the basis of the provisions of the Hague Convention.

On April 24, 2009, the US Embassy in Brazil issued the following message to the Brazilian government: "Brazil and the United States have an international agreement about how to handle wrongful retention and wrongful abduction of children from their original countries of residence: The Hague Convention of 1980. Both countries are obliged to make sure that this treaty is enforced. The wrongful removal and wrongful retention of children from their homes, and the forced separation of parent and child is unnecessary and cruel. The United States has facilitated the return of seven children to Brazil since the Hague treaty entered into force between our two countries. We call on the office of the Secretary of Human Rights to support the return of all children wrongfully removed and wrongfully retained."

== Parental alienation syndrome ==
The phenomenon of parental alienation syndrome (PAS) and patterns indicating a dynamic of parental alienation by the abducting parent have been reported by the left-behind parents of children abducted to Brazil. Parental alienation is a phenomenon in which the abducted child displays an antipathy towards the other parent and in which this antipathy is actively encouraged by the abducting parent. In June 2010 it was reported that a constitutional amendment incorporating parental alienation syndrome into the Brazilian legal code would have a bearing on child custody cases.

== Resolved cases of children abducted to Brazil ==
In 2001, a federal judge in Santos issued the first ever judgement in Brazil under the Hague Convention, calling for the return of a child to his habitual residence in Sweden. The child was born in Santos in September 1991 and the family lived in Brazil until January 1996. The couple separated in 1999 under Swedish law and this was their country of residence at the time. Joint custody was granted under Swedish legislation. In 2000, the mother and the 9-year-old child traveled to Brazil with the father's agreement. However, the mother retained the child in Brazil after the authorized travel period, ignoring the custody decision already established by the Swedish court. The father of the child filed a judicial return petition in the Brazilian courts under the convention, informing the Brazilian judge of the custody decision determined by the competent court in Sweden.

The Brazilian federal judge granted a verdict favorable to the return of the child to the country of his habitual residence (at the time of his removal), and the judgement stated that the retention of the child in Brazil by his mother was illegal, applying articles 3 and 4 of the convention. The child returned to Sweden on the same day that the federal judge issued the court order to return the child.

== Unresolved cases of children abducted to Brazil ==
According to a 2009 New York Times report, there are presently around fifty unsolved convention cases between the United States and Brazil.

== See also ==
- International child abduction in Japan
- International child abduction in Mexico
- International child abduction in the United States
- Child abduction
- Crime in Brazil
- Human rights in Brazil
- Amber alert
- Kidnapping
- Missing Kids Website
- National Center for Missing and Exploited Children
- Trafficking of children
- Take Root
- Brazil – United States relations
- Hague Abduction Convention Compliance Reports
