= Chinese people =

- Traditional Chinese: 華人
- Simplified Chinese: 华人
Transcriptions
Standard Mandarin
- Hanyu Pinyin: Huárén

Alternative Chinese name
- Traditional Chinese: 中國人
- Simplified Chinese: 中国人
Transcriptions
Standard Mandarin
- Hanyu Pinyin: Zhōngguóren

The Chinese people, or simply Chinese, are people or ethnic groups identified with China. Understandings of who is considered Chinese have shifted across time through social construction.

People of Chinese ethnicity or ancestry who live outside Greater China may consider themselves overseas Chinese. In some areas throughout the world, ethnic enclaves known as Chinatowns are home to populations of overseas Chinese.

== Terminology ==
The term Zhōngguó zhī rén (Chinese: 中國之人; lit. 'people of China'; Manchu: ᡩᡠᠯᡳᠮᠪᠠᡳ
ᡤᡠᡵᡠᠨ ‍ᡳ
ᠨᡳᠶᠠᠯᠮᠠ, romanized: Dulimbai gurun-i niyalma) was used by the Qing government to refer to all traditionally native subjects of the empire, including Han, Manchu, and Mongols. In modern Chinese, there is a distinction between Huaren and Zhongguoren. The former term refers to ethnic Chinese, and is often used for those who reside overseas or those who are non-citizens. The latter term refers to people who have lived in China or are Chinese citizens. The term Zhongguoren has a more political or ideological aspect in its use, and while many in China may use Zhongguoren to mean the Chinese ethnicity, some in Taiwan would refuse to be called Zhongguoren.

People from Taiwan, which is officially called the Republic of China (ROC), may also be referred to as "Chinese" in various contexts, though they are usually referred to as "Taiwanese". The territory of Taiwan is disputed and the ROC has limited recognition of its sovereignty.

== Ethnicities ==
A number of ethnic groups as well as other racial minorities of China are referred to as Chinese people. Zhonghua minzu (Chinese: 中华民族), the "Chinese nation", is a supra-ethnic concept which includes all 56 ethnic groups living in China that are officially recognized by the government of the People's Republic of China. It includes established ethnic groups who have lived within the borders of premodern China. The term zhonghua minzu was used during the Republic of China from 1911 to 1949 to refer to five primary ethnic groups (Note: The Han, the Manchu, the Mongols, the Hui (applied to Muslims as a whole), and the Tibetans.) in China. The term zhongguo renmin (Chinese: 中国人民), "Chinese people", was the government's preferred term during the early communist era; zhonghua minzu is more common in recent decades.

=== Han Chinese ===
The Han Chinese, alternatively Han people (Note: simplified Chinese: 汉族; traditional Chinese: 漢族; pinyin: Hànzú; lit. 'Han ethnic group' or simplified Chinese: 汉人; traditional Chinese: 漢人; pinyin: Hànrén; lit. 'Han people') or Chinese people, are an East Asian ethnic group native to Greater China. With a global population of over 1.4 billion, the Han Chinese are the world's largest ethnic group, making up about 17% of the world population. The Han Chinese represent 91.11% of the population in China and 97% of the population in Taiwan. They are a significant diasporic group in Southeast Asian countries such as Singapore, Thailand, Malaysia, Myanmar, Vietnam, the Philippines and Indonesia.

Han Chinese have exerted the primary formative influence in Chinese culture and history. Han Chinese trace their ancestry and culture to the Huaxia people, a confederation of agricultural tribes that lived along the middle and lower reaches of the Yellow River in the north central plains of China.

Han Chinese people and culture later spread southwards in the Chinese mainland, driven by large and sustained waves of migration during successive periods of Chinese history, for example the Qin (221–206 BC) and Han (202 BC – 220 AD) dynasties, leading to a demographic and economic tilt towards the south, and the absorption of various non-Han ethnic groups over the centuries at various points in Chinese history. The Han Chinese became the main inhabitants of the fertile lowland areas and cities of Southern China by the time of the Tang and Song dynasties, with minority tribes occupying the highlands.

=== Ethnic minorities ===
The Chinese government recognizes 56 ethnic groups in China. Other ethnic groups in China include the Zhuang, Hui, Manchus, Uyghurs, and Miao, who make up the five largest ethnic minorities in mainland China, with populations of approximately 10 million or more. In addition, the Yi, Tujia, Tibetans and Mongols each have populations between five and ten million. Ethnic minorities may consider themselves Zhongguoren.

== Diaspora ==
An Overseas Chinese person is a person of Chinese ancestry or is a person of full or partial Chinese origin who traces his or her ancestry back to the Greater China but are living and working outside of Greater China (mainland China, Hong Kong, Macau, and Taiwan). This term generally applies to both people of Chinese ancestry and citizens abroad.

As of 2026, approximately 40 million ethnic Chinese live abroad. As of 2023, there were 10.5 million people living outside mainland China who were born in mainland China, corresponding to 0.7 percent of China's population. Overall, China has a low percent of its population living overseas.

== See also ==
- Chinese ancestral veneration
- Chinese folk religion
- Chinese nationality
- Ethnic groups in Chinese history
- Unrecognized ethnic groups in China
