= International child abduction in Mexico =

Coat of arms of Mexico

Mexico is amongst the world's most popular sources and destinations for international child abduction while also being widely regarded as having one of the least effective systems of protecting and returning internationally abducted children within its borders.

To help protect abducted children Mexico signed on to the United Nations Convention on the Rights of the Child in 1990, the Hague Convention on the Civil Aspects of International Child Abduction in 1991, the Inter-American Convention on the International Return of Children and the Inter-American Convention on International Traffic in Minors.

Since adhering to the Hague Abduction Convention, the world's most recognized and utilized instrument for addressing international child abduction or parental child trafficking, Mexico has been repeatedly criticized for enjoying the benefit of having its treaty partners protect Mexico's own internationally abducted children, while being consistently non-compliant in fulfilling its reciprocal obligations to protect and return children abducted to Mexico. To date its procedures for enforcing its treaty obligations are unpredictable and entirely ineffective. The Centre for International Family Law Studies in Cardiff, Wales compared seven jurisdictions, including Mexico. The conclusion was that Mexico was by far the worst offender in its failure to return abducted children.

In consideration of Mexico's history of noncompliance, as documented extensively over the past 11 years in the US State Department's annual compliance reports, Texas courts made a landmark decision finding Mexico's legal system ineffective and lacking legal mechanisms for the immediate and effective enforcement of child custody orders and, furthermore stating, Mexico posed a risk to children's physical health and safety due to human rights violations committed against children, including child labor and a lack of child abuse laws.

The US State Department has posted multiple travel warnings for Mexico including at least one every year since 2007. In 2010, the murder of three Americans connected to the U.S. Consulate in Juarez prompted the US State Department to modify their warning to authorize the departure of children dependents of U.S. government personnel in U.S. consulates and offer financial assistance to relocating families.

Child abduction has been defined as a form of child abuse.

== Recovery of abducted children from Mexico ==
Broadly defined, there are five principal avenues for attempting to recover children abducted to Mexico: the Hague Convention, deportation/expulsion, criminal extradition, domestic Mexican family law and other, mostly extralegal, options.

=== Hague Convention ===
The Hague Convention is widely viewed as completely ineffective in Mexico with the country being extensively cited as having problems with nearly every aspect of its implementation. Oftentimes children can not be located for Convention proceedings to start due to problems with law enforcements performance. Law enforcement has reported an inability to locate children even when parents have reported giving them the children's exact address in Mexico. Although, Mexico claims to provide free legal representation for victim parents the provided representation is often completely unable to move the case forward and will only represent the parent during the natural trial, not during appeals. Parents who have been able to gain traction in Mexican courts have turned to private attorneys. Even when these attorneys have won favorable verdicts they are not enforced if the abductor files appeals or amparos which suspend enforcement of the decision until they've been adjudicated, frequently causing years of delays. In the unlikely event that children are located, legal proceedings commence, all appeals are heard and a final return order is issued, the abductor may appeal the manner in which the order is enforced (though it is less likely that enforcement will be suspended in such cases.) Once all judicial hurdles to enforcement have been cleared law enforcement issues can arise anew due to their inability to locate children as in the case of the Combe-Rivas abduction where, after four years, the Mexican Supreme Court issued a final decision ordering the child's return in June 2009. To date the decision remains unenforced due to an inability to locate the child.

=== Domestic family law ===
Mexican courts grant automatic custody of children below 7–12 years (depending on the state) to mothers unless they have been proven to be unfit. This maternal preference has been the subject of Constitutional challenges on the basis that the Mexican Constitution enshrines the equality of the sexes, but has been upheld on the grounds that the Constitution also protects the integrity of the family. Custody cases are also not immune to a number of the problems found in Hague cases and, even if a custody decision were to be won it would not necessarily allow for the child to be taken back out of Mexico. In cases where taking the child back out of Mexico to the home country is sought the decision can be subject to the same lack of enforceability pending the exhaustion of all appeals that plagues Hague Convention applications.

=== Extradition ===
The current Extradition Treaty between the United States of America and the United Mexican States (see 31 U.S.T. 5061) was signed by President Jimmy Carter in 1978 and went into effect in 1980. Like other such treaties, it provides for the extradition of a party who has been charged with or found guilty of an offense committed in the United States, who has fled to Mexico. An offense is extraditable if it is a crime in both countries and punishable by incarceration for a period of one year or more. In theory this allows for the extradition of child abductors who have absconded to Mexico as child abduction is a federal crime there. In practice US authorities rarely request extradition in preference of Hague Convention litigation and, even when they do, Mexico is not bound to deliver up its nationals. If extradition is denied based on nationality, the request for extradition is automatically converted into a foreign prosecution pursuant to Article IV of the Mexican Federal Penal Code. Although by law Mexican authorities are authorized to extradite their own nationals in “exceptional circumstances”, in practice they most often will refuse to do so. (See “Ley De Extradicion Internacional”, enacted May 19, 1897, revised January 10, 1994: “extradition of Mexican nationals is prohibited except in “exceptional” circumstances”.) “Nationality” is also liberally construed and often, marriage to a national, having dual citizenship, parents or other close relatives who are Mexican nationals, or simply having a Hispanic surname will suffice for purposes of extradition.

Prosecutors in Mexico have asserted that prosecution under Article IV of the Mexican Penal Code is sufficient compliance with the Extradition Treaty and allows Mexico to try fugitives for crimes committed in a foreign territory by a Mexican citizen. The trial is conducted in accordance with Mexican Federal Law when the accused has not been tried in the country where he committed the offense. Although efforts are underway to address the widespread corruption which has historically plagued Mexican judicial and law enforcement communities, little is known about the results of Article IV prosecutions. Often warrants remain in their system, unserved, for years. Prosecutions are commenced and then dismissed or have their sentences substantially reduced in appellate courts. No verifiable system exists to track sentences served. Demands for such information have been mostly ignored by the Mexican government. Informal surveys of law enforcement regarding the results of such prosecution reveal an abysmal record. Approximately 85% of the cases appear to have never been prosecuted. The remaining cases appear to result in acquittals or vastly reduced sentences in comparison to what would have been the sentence in the United States. The Extradition Treaty bars future extradition once a “trial” has been conducted in either country and, regardless of the result, double jeopardy provisions generally bar subsequent prosecution in multiple US States if the suspect returns to the United States, regardless of the outcome in Mexico.

Additionally, even if extradition of the abductor is successful, it does not guarantee the return of an abducted child. Extended families of parental child abductors in Mexico, including aunts and grandparents, have also been able to tie up repatriation efforts, under the Hague Convention or Mexican family law, for years.

=== Deportation or expulsion ===
Deportation and expulsion options are frequently quite successful at returning child abductors and children, but can only be used when the abductor is not a citizen of Mexico as the Mexican Constitution prohibits the deportation of its citizens.

== Corruption and crime in Mexico ==
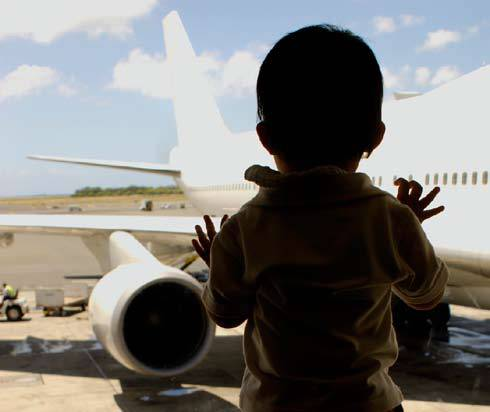
Image from 2007 US Abduction Compliance Report

Corruption is an intrinsic part of the problem with international child abduction in Mexico and affects every other aspect of the issue from locating children and judicial decisions to enforcing court orders for repatriation in the rare cases where the obstacles of locating children and judicial noncompliance have been overcome. Parents of children abducted to Mexico have reported being asked for a "mordida" (literally "bite", ubiquitoius slang for bribe in Mexico) in order for Mexican officials to do routine work. Mexico bears the stigma of being considered one of the most corrupt countries in the hemisphere. Experts say the corruption extends from ordinary citizens to high reaches of government and that most Mexicans have become accustomed to paying bribes and to the notion that the average police officer will try to shake them down in some way.

A 2005 study measuring corruption by Berlin-based Transparency International found that 50 percent of Mexicans remain pessimistic about corruption and believe it will get worse. The survey showed that Mexico was one of the top four countries where the largest number of respondents answered yes when asked if they or someone in their family had paid any kind of bribe in the last 12 months. In Mexico the ruling elite often operate outside of the law leading to the police becoming an instrument by which the rule of force is implemented. Without respect for the rule of law economic activity becomes arbitrary and unpredictable, and something as simple as a business contract can quickly become unenforceable.

A United Nations Special Rapporteur undertook a mission to Mexico in 2002 to investigate reports by the United Nations Commission on Human Rights that the country's judiciary and administration of law was not independent. During the course of his visit to a number of cities, the rapporteur observed that corruption in the judiciary had not been reduced significantly. One of the principal issues is that, because the federal courts operate at a relatively high level, most citizens are compelled to seek justice in the inadequate state courts. Additionally, the rapporteur expressed concerns about such issues as disorganization in the legal profession, difficulties and harassment faced by lawyers, poor trial procedures, poor access to the justice system for indigenous peoples and minors, and lacklustre investigation of multiple crimes.

According to the 2009 Human Rights Report prepared by the US State Department, although the judiciary is independent, weaknesses in the system, particularly in jurisdictions where reforms have not been implemented, make court decisions susceptible to improper influence by both private and public entities, particularly at the state and local level. Civil society organizations reported that corruption, inefficiency, and a lack of transparency continued to be major problems in the judiciary. NGO representatives reported that the country's conviction rate was only between 1 and 2 percent, citing a general indifference and ineffectiveness of the justice system. A poll conducted by Grupo Reforma and published in a Mexico City daily in August found that 68 percent of respondents had no or little trust in the judiciary.

In addition to being unable to locate children or adjudicate child abduction cases, Mexico also has one of the highest general kidnapping rates in the world, with dozens of adult U.S. citizens among the victims. Officially, an average of 70 people are abducted by strangers each month, although private security firms say the real figure is 10 times higher.

== Mexican Legal System ==

Mexico is a federal republic, composed of 31 states and a Federal District (Distrito Federal.) Mexico's legal system is basically a civil law jurisdiction derived from a mixture of Roman Law and the French Napoleonic Code. There is little binding case law in Mexico. Judgments made at the Federal level by the Mexican Supreme Court and federal circuit courts, or at the State level by the Tribunal Superior de Justicicia are not widely published and are of persuasive value only. There is some binding case law, known as jurisprudencia. For this to be made binding, an issue must be interpreted the same way in five consecutive Amparo trials, and there must not be a conflicting decision by the Supreme Court. In each of the 31 states in Mexico, state law establishes the structure and function of the courts, as well as its own constitution, laws, regulations, and decrees. Generally, state courts are organized in the following way: the highest appellate court is known as the Superior Court of Justice (Tribunal Superior de Justicia); this court is followed by the Courts of First Instance (Tribunales de Primera Instancia) of ordinary jurisdiction, responsible for hearing civil, criminal and commercial causes.

=== The Amparo in Mexico ===
The Amparo, which translates to "protection" or "help", is a Mexican legal procedure to protect constitutional rights that was incorporated into the 1847 national constitution. Mexico's "recurso de amparo" is found in Articles 103 and 107 of the Mexican Constitution Any Mexican citizen can file an amparo claiming that a Mexican authority is violating their constitutional rights. Federal District courts are available in every state in Mexico and have secretaries available 24 hours a day 365 days a year to receive an Amparo. In cases of international child abduction an amparo can be filed at any point and effectively blocks progression of legal procedures until it has been heard, often a number of months, or even years later. The decision in an Amparo trial can also be further appealed and multiple amparos may be filed during legal proceedings under the Hague Convention.

=== Hague Convention on the Civil Aspects of International Child Abduction ===
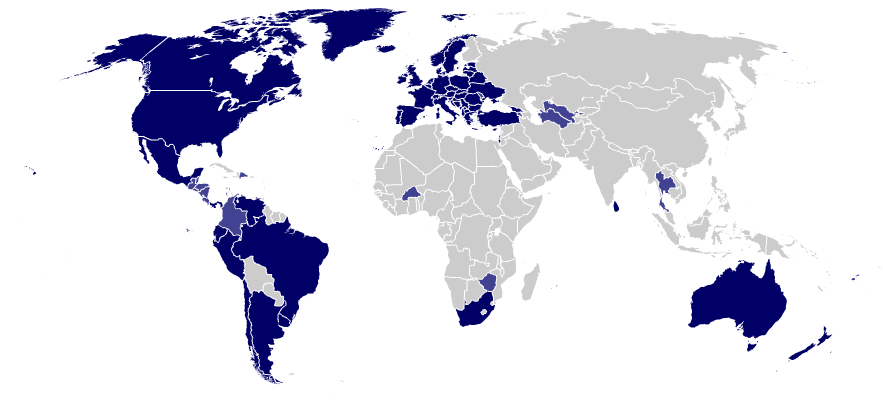
Hague Abduction parties

The Hague Convention on the Civil Aspects of International Child Abduction, commonly referred to as the Hague Abduction Convention is the primary instrument for addressing international abduction cases in Mexico. The convention is (from November 2013) in force between Mexico and all other parties to the convention except Bosnia and Herzegovina, Macedonia and Montenegro (which have to accept the ratification of Mexico), and Kazakhstan (which ratification has to be accepted by Mexico). The US Department of State has listed Mexico as non-compliant or "demonstrating patterns of noncompliance" with the Hague Convention every year that compliance reports began being published in 1999 citing multiple problems across all aspects of Convention compliance and implementation in Mexico including law enforcement, judicial, legislative and central authority performance.

==== Mexican Central Authority ====
Article 6 of the Hague Convention on the Civil Aspects of International Child Abduction stipulates that each "contracting State" shall designate a Central Authority to discharge the duties which are imposed by the convention. Article 7 of the Convention details the responsibilities of Central Authorities requiring they co-operate with foreign Central Authorities to promote cooperation amongst the competent authorities in their respective States to secure the prompt return of children by taking all appropriate measures, either directly or through any intermediary, to locate and protect abducted children and facilitate their prompt repatriation to their place of habitual residence prior to their abduction.

Mexico has designated an office within its primary foreign affairs organization the, Secretaría de Relaciones Exteriores (Secretary of Foreign Relations) to fulfill the role of Mexican Central Authority—specifically the Family Right's Office ("Oficina de Derecho de Familia") of the Division of Protection and Consular Affairs ("Dirección General de Protección y Asuntos Consulares.")

In addition to the Central Authority designated by Mexico in accordance with Article 6 of the convention, Mexico has appointed State level Central Authorities. The Central Authority to which Hague applications may be addressed for transmission to the appropriate State Central Authority remains the federal Central Authority.

==== Courts Empowered to Hear Hague Cases ====
There are five levels of Mexican courts that a Hague case may pass through before becoming a final order. Although Mexican federal and state courts have double jurisdiction to hear Hague cases they are normally filed and heard in the family court with jurisdiction over the area that the abducted child is in.

FEDERAL COURTS
Mexico Supreme Court (Suprema Corte de Justicia de la Nación)
Circuit Courts (Tribunales de Circuito)
District Courts (Juzgados de Distrito)
STATE COURTS
Superior Court of Justice (Tribunal Superior de Justicia)
Civil Courts of First Instance (Tribunales Civiles de Primera Instancia)

The Mexican Supreme Court is the highest court in the land. The circuit Courts hear appeals. The District Courts hear Amparos.

==== Legislative Problems in Hague Cases ====
Under the Mexican Constitution international treaties have direct effect and are, like federal laws, are hierarchically above all State laws but beneath the constitution. Mexico has never formally adopted other laws or procedures to implement the Hague Convention in its domestic legal codes. There is some debate as to the correct legal precedence to be applied when federal laws and international treaties are in conflict. In theory this gives the treaty sufficient legal clout to be effective but, in practice, the lack of implementing legislation leads to multiple divergent and contradictory interpretations of the Convention which is intentionally vague in certain areas to allow for it to apply to a broad range of cases.

Mexico, like the United States, is composed of individual states with great latitude to make their own laws so long as those laws don't conflict with federal laws and, in particular, the countries, Magna Carta (constitution). Every state in Mexico, besides one, has laws granting automatic custody to mother's during a divorce until the child reaches the age of 7. In the one state to vary from this norm the maternal preference is until age 12. These laws have been the subject of constitutional challenges on the basis that the Mexican Constitution guarantees the equality of the sexes but have been upheld by the Supreme Court of Mexico (Suprema Corte de Justicia de la Nación) since the Constitution also requires the proper development of the family and, by extension, minor children.

==== Judicial Performance ====
U.S. Congressmen have noted the worsening situation concerning child abduction and states like Mexico that "routinely invoke the Article 13 exceptions as a justification for non-return, rather than resorting to [the exceptions] in a small number of . . .cases.” Congressman emphasized that two of the convention's exceptions are overly used by some nation-states to justify this refusal to comply with the Convention The two exceptions most often evoked are the “grave risk” exception and the “child objection” exception and that Mexico was one of the most notorious abusers of these exceptions.

=== United Nations Convention on the Rights of the Child ===
The Convention on the Rights of the Child enumerates the fundamental civil, political, economic, social and cultural rights of children. Because of the precedence afforded international treaties in Mexico the CRC is of critical importance to legal issues related to children and is frequently cited during domestic Child custody cases as well as cases of child abduction. There are a number of articles that deal indirectly or directly with child abduction in the CRC and demonstrate the violations of children's rights that frequently occur during international child abductions:

Articles 7 and 8 of the Convention protect a child's right to a name and a nationality.

Article 9 protects a child's right to not be separated from his or her parents against their will and to maintain personal relations and direct contact with both parents on a regular basis, except when competent authorities subject to judicial review determine, in accordance with applicable law and procedures, that such separation is necessary for the best interests of the child.

In accordance with Article 9, Article 10 stipulates that applications for international travel for purposes of family unification be dealt with in a positive, humane and expeditious manner and that the submission of such a request shall entail no adverse consequences for the applicants and for the members of their family.

Articles 11 and 35, specifically exhort State Parties to take all appropriate national, bilateral and multilateral measures to combat the illicit transfer and non-return of children abroad and promote the conclusion of bilateral or multilateral agreements or accession to existing agreements and measures to prevent the abduction of children.

== Problems Locating Children ==
One of the primary road blocks to Mexico's successful implementation of the Hague Abduction Convention is its inability to locate children. This issue has been cited multiple times in the US State Department's annual Compliance Reports. In some cases the US State Department has reported providing Mexican authorities with detailed information on the whereabouts of abducted children including the exact address where they are living but Mexican authorities still report an inability to locate the children. In one case it took over a year for an abducted child to be located. Once located a nearly three year legal battle ensued which was fought all the way to the Mexican Supreme Court which confirmed the lower courts decision ordering the child's return in June 2009. The abducting parent subsequently went back into hiding and the Supreme Courts order remains unenforced due to Mexico's inability to locate the child. In late 2009 the Mexican Central Authority gave a presentation at an international symposium on international child abduction where they cited improvements as a result of turning over the responsibility of locating children to the Mexican Federal Police, or AFI, rather than exclusively using Interpol who has no authority and must request the involvement of Mexican law enforcement to take any real measures in Mexico.

== Child abduction between Mexico and Spain ==
Escudo de España

Spain is itself a nation cited as a country of concern in the 2002 US State Department Compliance Report. Mexico and Spain both report problems recovering internationally abducted children from each other's countries. In 2009 Patricia Espinosa, the secretary of Mexican foreign relations, publicly commented that, although both Spain and Mexico had signed the Hague Convention, neither of the countries had returned an abducted child to the other country since 2006 in spite of there being nine abductions of Mexican children to Spain and 12 abductions of Spanish children to Mexico during the same time period. This mutual noncompliance in honoring the Hague treaty has prompted some to say that both countries are paying each other with the same currency. In 2009 two Spanish fathers made the news in Mexico and Spain for the difficulties they were having in recovering their abducted children from the grandparents of their wives who had recently died of cancer. In both cases the Mexican family filed amparo appeals blocking enforcement of judicial decisions ordering the children returned home to their surviving custodial parent in Spain. One father, after 13 months of litigation and being granted custody of the child in Mexico but denied the ability to leave the country till the decision became final, fled the country and returned to Spain before the legal process finished amidst objections by Mexican authorities that he had acted illegally by removing his son before Mexican courts had finished the lengthy appeal process.

== Child abduction between Mexico and the USA ==
US Great Seal

Overwhelmingly, Mexico is the number one destination for international child abductions from the United States and the United States is the number one destination for children abducted from Mexico. The U.S. State Department reports that 65% of all outgoing international parental abductions from the United States to Hague Convention countries are to Mexico, and that 41% of all incoming international parental abductions to the United States are from Mexico.

=== United States – Mexico border security ===
The U.S.–Mexico border has the highest number of both legal and illegal crossings of any land border in the world. The border is guarded by more than seventeen thousand border patrol agents, however they only have "effective control" of less than 700 miles of the 1,954 miles of total border. There are an estimated half a million illegal entries into the United States each year. Investigations have indicated that between 1990 and November 2008, 93 cross-border tunnels were discovered, 35 of which were in California, 57 in Arizona, and 1 in Washington State. In terms of international child abduction from the US into Mexico specifically, the problem of poor border security in general is compounded by the fact the United States does not have exit controls; American children may be taken across the southern border of the United States without even having the necessary documentation to get back into the country. Furthermore, there is no accounting for children taken across the border into Mexico, leading to thousands of missing children posters with the words "may have traveled to Mexico" on them.

=== Abduction by the Numbers ===
Most of the general statistics on child abduction are extrapolated from a 1990 Department of Justice study called National Incidence Studies of Missing, Abducted, Runaway and Thrownaway Children. The study indicated 354,100 abductions per year by family members in custody disputes. The same study reports about 114,600 stranger-abductions are attempted per year, of which about 3,200 to 4,600 are successful.

One of the few sources for numbers of abductions across international borders is the United States Department of State which acts as the United States Central Authority for the Hague Convention on the Civil Aspects of International Child Abduction, although even they preface these numbers with the warning that "Under the Convention, return applications may also be filed either directly with the Central Authority of the state where the child is located or with a foreign court with jurisdiction to hear the return request. The left-behind parent may pursue return without involving the U.S. Central Authority. In these circumstances, the U.S. Central Authority may never know about such a request and its disposition". Although the State Department published compliance reports for 1998 through 2008 it only began publishing the number of "new cases" in a given year in 2007. In 2009, an article published by a State Department public outreach coordinator also listed the totals for years 2006–2008.

International abductions from the United States to Mexico as a percent of total international child abductions

Year	Total	To Mexico	To All Hague Countries	To Non-Hague Countries	%Total Abductions	%Hague Abductions
2009	1621	474	1194	427	29%	40%
2008*	1600	533	1160	440	33%	46%
2007	1144	320	821	323	28%	39%
2006	933					

From the above data for years 2006-2008 we can see that the overall number of abductions increased by 23% year of year in 2006 and 40% in 2007, and that abductions to Mexico specifically increased 67% over in 2007.

- There is a discrepancy in the 2008 report. In the introduction of the report it states "In FY 2008, the USCA assisted many LBPs in the United States with ongoing cases and responded to 1,082 new IPCA cases involving 1,615 children". Although looking at the actual statistics in the report only 1600 are accounted for. The cause for these missing missing children is unknown.

=== Criticism of the United States government's role ===
Child abduction to Mexico from the US is as much an American policy problem as it is a Mexican one. Inasmuch as Mexico is cited for failing to take appropriate measures to curb the international abduction of children, the US government is likewise criticized for not taking appropriate measures to protect American children or support American parents in their efforts to recover their internationally abducted children. The proximity and close relationship between the United States and Mexico makes the problems of one country the problems of both and, by extension, places the responsibility of addressing the problem on both countries. US officials recognize this and have increasingly worked to assist Mexico by providing training and education to Mexican judges and law enforcement. This type of bilateral cooperation is part of a broadening recognition of the responsibility both nations share in addressing problems in the region, and is most notably demonstrated in the Mérida Initiative, the $1.4 billion aid package to help Mexico interdict illicit drugs, arms and human trafficking.

==== US State Department ====
American parents complain that they are essentially alone in dealing with foreign courts and legal systems. The US State Department has a virtual monopoly on information in such cases, but refuses to act as a vigorous advocate for left-behind American parents while also preventing the National Center for Missing and Exploited Children or anyone else from playing that role. State Department attorney Thomas Johnson remarked that when he reminded one senior State Department official with Child Abduction Convention responsibilities that she works for the American people, her immediate response was: "I don’t work for the American people; I work for the Secretary of State", demonstrating the Department's inherent conflict of interest (i.e., a desire to maintain "good" bilateral foreign relations for their own sake that overrides assertive and effective advocacy on behalf of American citizens).

=== Congressional Testimony ===
The problem of international child abduction in Mexico has been raised in several congressional inquiries.

Maura Harty, Assistant Secretary, Bureau of Consular Affairs, U.S. Department of State

"In Mexico, the destination country for the largest number of children abducted from the U.S., but from which only 25 children returned in 2003... The United States has no more important Hague Abduction Convention partner than Mexico. The number of cases we witness of children being taken to or from the U.S. and Mexico dwarf those we see with any other country. Especially troubling is the number of cases in Mexico that have remained unresolved after more than 18 months. There are presently 22 such cases, some now over five years old; in contrast, we have no more than two such cases with any other Hague partner. Among the underlying causes of Mexico's poor performance overall under the Hague Convention appear to be a woefully understaffed and underfunded Central Authority in the Foreign Ministry; a judiciary unfamiliar with, and not infrequently hostile to, the Convention; and law enforcement and court authorities unable to locate children even in cases in which we and the left-behind parents can provide exact addresses. In general, Mexico has only partially implemented the Hague Abduction Convention into its legal, administrative and law enforcement systems. As a result, we found Mexico to be non-compliant in our last Annual Hague Compliance Report."

John Walsh, Television Host of America's Most Wanted and co-founder, National Center for Missing & Exploited Children

"I was here once before when we bailed out Mexico with the NAFTA treaty. The peso was falling apart. I was down in Mexico doing shows, drug dealers and cartels everywhere, and we were going to lend them billions of dollars. And I went to President Clinton myself and then Attorney General Janet Reno, and I said we need one thing. If we are going to bail Mexico out, let us make them sign an extradition treaty of fugitives, murders, criminals and get our kids back from Mexico. Right? Did not happen. What a perfect time for us to say we are going to save your entire country, we are going to lend you billions of dollars and shore up your economy, but you know what, since that meeting with President Clinton we now have on record over 3,000 murders and fugitives down there and we do not know how many kids".

Congressman Benjamin A. Gilman( New York) and Chairman of the Committee on International Relations

It is unfortunate that we are in the position of having to criticize by name several nations with whom we have otherwise friendly relations, Germany, Austria, Sweden, Honduras and Mexico, but it is clear from the circumstances that it is necessary to do so. I want to commend the gentleman from Ohio Mr. Chabot, who, on behalf of some 132 cosponsors, introduced this measure. I would also like to thank Mr. Lampson from Texas as the Chairman of the Caucus on Missing and Exploited Children, and Mr. Ose from the State of California, who have devoted much of their time to raising our level of awareness of the growing problem of international child abduction. We are taking action on this measure on behalf of the parents of our abducted and wrongfully retained children. These left-behind parents have put their faith and trust in an international agreement, The Hague Convention, which is clear and explicit on the obligation of signatory governments to return an abducted or wrongfully retained child to his or her country of habitual residence. Nevertheless, we have found that in a number of nations, for a variety of reasons, this does not occur, and the resultant frustration, heartbreak and outrage has led us to act on the measure before us today. I should also add that we need to have our State Department do more to promote compliance with The Hague Convention. The return of an abducted or illegally retained child should be on the top of the Secretary's meetings with any official of a country involved in such cases. This is not a problem that should be handled as a routine exchange of diplomatic notes or phone calls by junior U.S. officials to their foreign counterparts. We need to see some concern and some concrete actions by the highest levels of our government to redress what is, evidently, a growing international problem. It is our hope that by adopting this resolution, and sending it to the floor for speedy action, we will send a strong signal that this is an issue that we care deeply about. We need to get the attention of the Governments of Germany, Sweden, Austria, Mexico, and Honduras that they cannot expect The Hague Convention to be a one-way street.

Honorable Bernard W. Aronson, Assistant Secretary of State for Inter-American Affairs (1989–1993)

"..the current system to secure the return of these abducted American children does not work and will not work unless it is changed profoundly. I don't doubt the sincerity or the dedication of the professionals in the State Department who have lead responsibility for this problem, but they do not have the tools and powers to do their job effectively. And unless Congress gives them the power and the tools we will be back here in five years or 10 years with another set of hearings, another group of parents with broken hearts and devastated dreams, and we will be making the same statements we are making today."

"the principal reason other nations, whether they are signatories to the Hague Convention or not, refuse to cooperate with the United States in returning abducted American children is that there are no real consequences for failing to do so."

"Let me be blunt, a diplomatic request for which there are no consequences for refusal is just a sophisticated version of begging. And there are no consequences today for Brazil or any other nation which refuses to return American children."

=== History of noncompliance: US State Department Compliance Reports ===
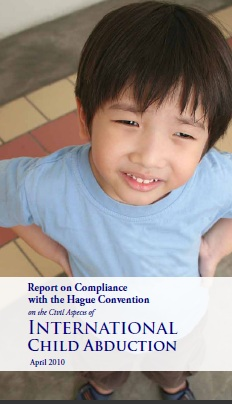
U.S. Department of State - Report on Compliance with the Hague Convention on the Civil Aspects of International Child Abduction - Compliance Report 2010 (pdf) (4,3 MB)

In recognition of the fact that the US State Department would not voluntarily inform Congress, U.S. courts, law enforcement authorities, family law attorneys or the general public about the gross noncompliance of foreign countries in adhering to the Hague Convention on International Child Abduction, Congress enacted an annual reporting requirement obligating the State Department to publish a detailed annual report on the reliability and effectiveness of the Convention in protecting and securing the return of abducted American children in foreign countries hoping that the law would make available a unique and vitally important source of information to parents, courts, governments and attorneys worldwide. These reports are known as the Hague Abduction Convention Compliance Reports or simply Compliance Reports.

These reports highlight countries of particular concern in that they are noncompliant with the convention or exhibit a "pattern of noncompliance." Since 1999 Mexico has been cited every year as being noncompliant or exhibiting "patterns of noncompliance" for a number of problems, such as a failure to locate children, failure to understand international law, and failures to enforce their own judicial decisions due to widespread abuse of the Amparo procedure. In addition to the summary details on Mexico below, the reports in modern years have included extended details on dozens of individual cases that have not been resolved, or even progressed, in years.

2010 Compliance Report: "Noncompliant"

The Department finds Mexico not compliant with the Convention in FY 2009. The USCA observed noncompliance in the areas of law enforcement and judicial performance, and experienced serious difficulties communicating with the Mexican Central Authority (MCA) that resulted in costly inconvenience for LBPs and significant delays in processing return applications.

The USCA submitted 309 applications for the return of abducted children to the MCA in FY 2009, predictably more than to any other country to which children were abducted from the United States given the cross-border activity between Mexico and the United States. The USCA identified 53 unresolved cases that had been pending for 18 months or more subsequent to the filing of the application (see “Unresolved Return Applications” section of this report). In 38 of these unresolved cases, the USCA requested the MCA's assistance to locate the children with the help of Mexican law enforcement authorities, including Interpol and Mexico's federal investigations agency, the Agencia Federal de Investigación (AFI). In many of the cases, the LBP was able to provide the MCA with last known street addresses for the TP and child along with telephone numbers and the names of the schools the child might be attending, but the Mexican authorities failed to locate them. Two main factors, we believe, contributed to this problem: first, too few law enforcement agents have been assigned to cover large territories and populations; and second, an apparent lower priority has been given to international child abduction cases compared to other, increasingly violent criminal activity.

Mexico took some encouraging steps to comply with the convention during FY 2009. Mexico returned children to the United States in 30 separate cases. Twenty-one of these cases involved court-ordered returns under the convention, and 13 of these took place less than 12 months after the LBP filed the application for return with the MCA. The MCA assisted U.S. LBPs in at least six cases by contacting Mexican consulates in the United States to request that they expedite processing of powers of attorney needed for a third party to represent the LBP in court hearings in Mexico, and to authorize the third party to take temporary custody of the child to bring him or her back to the United States because the LBP could not travel. The MCA and the state Supreme Courts of Nuevo León and Guanajuato collaborated with the U.S. Embassy to carry out two judicial seminars in late September, involving USCA and academic experts from Guadalajara and Mexico City.

In FY 2009, Mexican courts continued to demonstrate patterns of delay in processing applications under the convention, as illustrated by several of the cases listed under Mexico in the “Unresolved Return Applications” section of this report. In at least two instances, six months elapsed between the time the case was assigned to a court and the date of the first hearing; in another, seven months elapsed. In five other cases, it took between 16 and 55 months before the court held the first hearing on the application for return. These delays disadvantaged LBPs and led to rulings that the children should not be returned because they had become “settled” in their new environment, an exception to return listed in Article 12 of the convention.

The USCA observed the following three causal factors for judicial delays: (1)lack of implementing legislation or procedures for Convention applications and many Mexican judges following inapposite procedures found in state civil codes in resolving such cases; (2) lack of understanding of the convention by many Mexican judges, as evidenced by extensive requests for information, including letters under Article 15 of the convention from the USCA to confirm that a particular case involved an international child abduction as defined by the convention; and (3) TPs absconding with the children when summoned to a hearing because they were notified of the hearing but neither they nor the children were secured in any way. The USCA has observed that a tool for securing children in the Mexican system is for the judge to place the child temporarily in a children's protection service (Desarrollo Integral de la Familia, or DIF) shelter while the case is being processed, but judges are reluctant to place children in these shelters unless the TP is determined to be a clear danger to the child.

Application of the “amparo” (constitutionally-based appeal) process in ways that are inconsistent with commitments under the convention is an ongoing problem. TPs sometimes allege that the procedure under the Convention violates their right to due process under the Mexican Constitution. In response to the filing of an amparo, judges issue a provisional order that immediately freezes proceedings under the Convention pending adjudication of the underlying constitutional issue. Precedent exists in Mexican law to promptly adjudicate and reject an amparo in a Convention case alleging violation of due process. For example, both the Mexican Supreme Court and the highest court in the Federal District have determined that procedures under the Convention comport with the Constitution's due process requirements, and these decisions have been relied upon by lower courts. Despite these positive developments, adjudication of Convention-related amparos is still subject to frequent delay. During the reporting period, the MCA, the Hague Permanent Bureau, and the U.S. Government collaborated in three seminars designed to enhance judicial awareness of the convention, with special emphasis on the compatibility of the convention with the due process guarantees of the Mexican Constitution. The USCA and the U.S. Embassy repeatedly asked by email, telephone, fax, and letters for status updates on the longstanding cases detailed in the “Unresolved Return Applications” section of this report, but received no replies by the end of the reporting period in at least 19 of these cases.

The MCA has inadequate staffing. The Hague Permanent Bureau's Guide to Good Practice indicates that central authority staff should be “sufficient in numbers to cope with the workload” (Guide to Good Practice on Central Authority Performance, § 2.4.1). In the USCA's view, the MCA needs more staff in order to comply with Convention requirements, and Mexico needs to allocate more resources to enhance judicial training programs to improve judges’ understanding of the convention, to establish procedures to process applications in the absence of implementing legislation, and to improve Mexican law enforcement's ability to locate missing children.

2009 Compliance Report: "Patterns of Noncompliance"

Mexico demonstrated patterns of noncompliance in the areas of judicial and law enforcement performance in FY 2008. Many of the systemic problems identified in previous compliance reports persist. Locating children and TPs in Mexico continues to be a serious obstacle for Convention applicants and often takes years. There are instances in which TPs flee into hiding when ordered to appear in court for a hearing on a Convention application. Of the USCA's 47 unresolved cases concerning Mexico, 34 involve TPs and children who have not been located (see the "Unresolved Return Applications" section of this report for more information). Mexico devotes inadequate resources to locating missing children, severely impeding successful implementation of the convention. In order to comply with the convention, it is imperative for Mexico to devote more resources to locate missing children and bring TPs to justice.

Although there are states in Mexico where judges have a better understanding of the convention and have ordered returns under the convention, the USCA continues to note an overall pattern of noncompliance in Mexico's judicial system. In the few cases that led to the return of the child to the United States, the LBP retained a private attorney with a greater understanding of the convention's principles than Mexican public prosecutors have tended to exhibit. Mexican courts delay Convention cases and often improperly treat them as custody decisions. See Convention, art. 16. In these instances, Mexican judges determine children to be well settled in the new environment and deny the application for return to the child's country of habitual residence. This determination could be avoided by handling Convention cases more expeditiously and adhering more closely to the convention's requirements. Mexican judges have also abused the "amparo", a special type of constitutional challenge, which results in additional delays to Convention cases and increases the LBP's legal costs.

During FY 2008, the Mexican Central Authority (MCA) worked closely with the United States Embassy in Mexico City to persuade the Mexican branch of Interpol to apply more resources and efforts to locate abducted children, and to educate the judiciary in an effort to increase understanding of the convention, with an observable increase in Convention cases in the locations where these educational seminars were held. The MCA works closely with judges to help them improve their compliance with the convention. In spite of these efforts, the MCA's performance is inevitably affected by inadequate staffing

2008 Compliance Report: "Patterns of Noncompliance"

For FY 2007, Mexico demonstrated patterns of noncompliance. Many of the systemic problems mentioned in previous compliance reports persist. Locating children or taking parents in Mexico continues to be a serious impediment for Convention applicants, and often takes years.

Of the USCA's 31 unresolved cases from Mexico, 23 remain unresolved because the taking parents and the children have not been located (see the "Unresolved Cases" section of this report for more information). This inability to locate abducted children taken to Mexico remains the single largest frustration that left-behind parents in the United States face. Inadequate resources are devoted to locating missing children, severely undermining successful implementation of the Convention in Mexico. Cases can remain unresolved for years, as the taking parent and the child/ren are not located. Even in cases in which parents and children are located, taking parents often hide successfully when ordered to appear before a judge for a Convention hearing. Mexico must recognize the critical need to devote more resources to locating missing children and bringing abducting parents to justice in order to become compliant with the convention.

The department also continues to note patterns of noncompliance in Mexico's judicial system. Abuses of the Amparo appeal system during this reporting period often led to excessive delays in Convention cases and further increased the legal costs incurred by the left-behind parent. In the few successful cases that led to the return of the child to the United States, the left-behind parent turned to a private attorney who better understood the principles of the convention.

2007 Compliance Report: "Patterns of Noncompliance"

For FY 2006, the department continued to see patterns of noncompliance with the Convention in Mexico. Many of the systemic problems mentioned in previous compliance reports persist. Locating children or taking parents in Mexico continues to be a serious impediment for Convention applicants, and often takes years. Of the USCA ’s 30 unresolved cases, 24 remain unresolved because the taking parents and the children have not been located (see "Unresolved Cases" for more information).

An inability to locate abducted children taken to Mexico remains the single largest frustration that left-behind parents face. Often family members in Mexico help hide the taking parent and child and deny knowledge of their location when questioned by authorities. Taking parents also often disappear again when ordered to appear before a judge for a Convention hearing.

In addition to difficulty locating children, the department also continues to note occasional abuses of the amparo system, as discussed in the "Notable Issues and Cases" section of this report.

MEXICO: THE AMPARO LEGAL SYSTEM The United States has more outgoing IPCA cases to Mexico than to any other country. In the last decade, the USCA has opened more than 900 outgoing IPCA cases to Mexico, involving more than 1,300 children. The department therefore sees this issue as an important one that affects such a large number of its cases.

Under the Mexican Constitution, there is a legal procedure available to defendants called an amparo. An amparo, which translates to "protection" or "help", is an appeal allowable in any case in which the defendant challenges the constitutionality of a local court decision.

Although the department recognizes that amparos are an integral aspect of Mexican law designed to protect individuals’ legal rights, the USCA is concerned that amparo appeals are being used excessively in Convention return cases, and that Mexico is allowing taking parents to use the amparo process to delay cases and influence the outcome in ways that are not consistent with the principles of the convention. The department is encouraged by a recent decision by a Mexican federal judge, which overcame an amparo allowing a child to immediately return to the United States, and hopes this precedent will continue. By streamlining the amparo process in Convention cases, the Government of Mexico could better meet its treaty obligations.

2006 Compliance Report: "Patterns of Noncompliance"

Over the course of the latest reporting period, we have seen some notable improvements in the performance of the Mexican Central Authority (MCA). The MCA is continuing to forward Convention applications to judges much more expeditiously than before; whereas previously delays of three to six months were common, cases are now being forwarded to the courts as early as four to eight weeks after being received. MCA responsiveness has also improved. USCA case officers are in weekly if not daily contact with the MCA, a welcome change compared to past years. Relations between the MCA and U.S. Embassy Mexico City have significantly improved during the last year as well. They have held joint meetings and telephone conference calls with Mexican state representatives and left-behind parents, and have worked together to review the status of long outstanding cases. The training opportunities and judicial conferences organized by the Department for Mexican officials seem to be reaping benefits; the past year again saw a high number of court-ordered returns from Mexico to the United States.

Many of the systemic problems mentioned in previous compliance reports persist, however. Primarily, our greatest concern remains the inability to locate missing children and taking parents in Mexico. Although it does seem that the MCA is beginning to work more closely with the various branches of local law enforcement, including Interpol, there has not been a substantial change in the frequency with which children are found. Secondly, cases continue to experience lengthy court delays, especially due to the excessive use of a special appeal process (the "amparo") to block Convention proceedings almost indefinitely, and also due to the ability of the Mexican courts to reconsider factual determinations made by a lower court. These case delays could be dealt with through the passage of implementing legislation to integrate the Convention into the Mexican legal system, something that we have urged Mexico to do in the past. Finally, Mexico has participated in Department-sponsored training and conferences, but the Government of Mexico (GOM) has not taken sufficient lead to broaden the amount of training offered within its borders to judges, or to provide additional resources to the Mexican Central Authority. As a result, we continue to see Convention cases mishandled as custody cases and not strictly as Convention (i.e. habitual residence) determinations. As for enforcement of judicial orders for return, it seems the record in Mexico is mixed. Although some mechanisms do exist to enforce court orders, they are not utilized consistently.

We have made numerous appeals to the Mexican Government to invest greater funding and attention towards international child abduction-related issues, including strengthening the MCA by increasing resources and adding additional staff, offering more training for judges, and improving coordination with local resources for locating children. The U.S. Embassy and Consulates in Mexico have worked closely throughout the year with Mexican officials and judges to explain roles and obligations under the convention. Assistant Secretary of State for Consular Affairs Maura Harty has repeatedly raised U.S. Government concerns over Mexico's compliance problems with senior Mexican officials, including during the November 2004 Binational Commission meetings and during Secretary of State Rice's first trip to Mexico in March 2005. Mexican judges participated in Department-sponsored training and conferences, including a December 2004 Latin American Judicial Seminar, at which judges from 19 countries shared experiences and worked through cases studies using Convention principles. Nevertheless, the MCA has not taken a sufficient lead to broaden the amount of judicial training offered within its borders.

In the last report, Mexico was upgraded to "not fully compliant" from an earlier designation of "noncompliant" to reflect an increase in the number of successful returns and the GOM's efforts to address some of the Department's long-held concerns. We continue to be optimistic regarding Mexico. However, due to the persistence of the above-mentioned problems, we believe that Mexico should again be listed as "not fully compliant". Further improvements to Mexico's ranking in upcoming reports will require continued progress in resolving the remaining issues that complicate Convention case processing.

2005 Compliance Report: "Patterns of Noncompliance"

In the last report, the Department found Mexico to be noncompliant with the Convention due to systemic problems, including slow case handling, lack of progress in resolving cases, and inability to locate children. Mexico continues to be the destination country of the greatest number of children abducted from the United States or wrongfully retained outside the United States by parents or other relatives. Over the recent reporting period, the department has seen some notable improvements in the performance of the Mexican Central Authority (MCA). The MCA forwards Hague applications to judges much more expeditiously than before; whereas previously delays of 3–6 months were common, cases are now being forwarded to the courts as early as 4–8 weeks after being received. MCA responsiveness to inquiries from the U.S. Central Authority has also improved. The Office of Children's Issues is now in regular (weekly and at times daily) contact with the MCA. Mexican authorities and judges participated in various training opportunities and judicial conferences co-sponsored by the Department of State. This training appears to be having a positive effect. Over the past year we have seen the highest number of court-ordered returns from Mexico to the United States of any reporting period.

Many of the problems cited in the past do persist, however. Our greatest concern remains Mexico's inability to locate missing children or taking parents. In some cases, finding them takes years. Though the MCA has begun to work more closely with the various branches of local law enforcement, including Interpol, we have not observed a substantial change in the frequency with which children are found. Also of serious concern are lengthy court delays, especially due to the excessive use of a special Constitutional appeal process (the "amparo"), which can block Convention proceedings almost indefinitely.

Delays are also due to the ability of Mexican appellate courts to reconsider factual determinations made by a lower court. These case delays could be dealt with through the passage of implementing legislation incorporating Convention procedures and obligations, something that the Department of State has urged Mexico to do; we have seen no steps taken in this direction. In addition, Mexico's record on enforcement of judicial orders for return is mixed. Although some mechanisms do exist to enforce court orders, they are not utilized consistently. Finally, we continue to see Hague cases mishandled as custody cases rather than focusing on securing the prompt return of children wrongfully removed or retained abroad.

We have made numerous appeals to the Mexican Government to invest greater funding and attention towards international child abduction-related issues, including strengthening the MCA, offering more training for judges, and allocating more resources for locating children. The U.S. Embassy and Consulates in Mexico have worked closely throughout the year with Mexican officials and judges to explain roles and obligations under the Hague Convention. Assistant Secretary for Consular Affairs Maura Harty has repeatedly raised USG concerns over Mexico's compliance problems with senior Mexican officials, including during the November 2004 Binational Commission meetings and during Secretary of State Rice's first trip to Mexico in March 2005. Mexican judges participated in Department-sponsored training and conferences, including a December 2004 Latin American Judicial Seminar, at which judges from 19 countries in the hemisphere shared experience and worked through cases studies using Hague principles. Nevertheless, the MCA has not taken a sufficient lead in broadening the amount of training offered within its borders to judges. While the department is pleased at the progress seen since last year's report, there remains considerable room for improvement.

2004 Compliance Report: "Noncompliant"

Mexico remains the destination country of the greatest number of children abducted from or wrongfully retained outside the United States by parents or other relatives. Despite coordinated efforts undertaken by the U.S. Embassy, the U.S. Central Authority, and senior Department of State officials to press for more expeditious processing and resolution of cases, the systemic problems in Mexico's handling of Convention applications that were detailed in the 2002 Compliance Report persisted during the reporting period. The department's experience is that, relative to the large number of pending Convention cases in Mexico, the number of cases resolved annually in Mexico is quite small. Most Convention return applications remain pending and never progress to the point of a definitive adjudication. Among the U.S. Central Authority's greatest concerns is Mexico's inability to locate children. Other problems include long delays in adjudication of return applications, the Mexican Central Authority's lack of adequate resources to perform its role effectively, the absence of implementing legislation integrating the Convention into the Mexican legal system, and an apparent lack of understanding of the Convention among many Mexican judges, which has resulted in Convention cases being treated as custody matters or mishandled in other ways.

Mexico's inability to obtain better results in locating children and taking parents is particularly troubling. Many Convention return applications forwarded by the U.S. Central Authority have languished for years; when children and taking parents are not located, Mexican courts will not rule on the application. As a result, and despite persistent efforts by the U.S. Central Authority to prompt Mexican authorities to address these cases, numerous parents have waited for years with no contact or information about the whereabouts of their children. Of the return applications submitted to the Mexican Central Authority that remained unresolved after eighteen months or longer, approximately half remain in limbo because Mexican authorities have not located the children. As a practical matter, the left-behind parent or someone working on his/her behalf must develop most leads pertaining to the possible location of abducted children without the help of Mexican authorities. In some cases, Mexican authorities profess an inability to find children even when the family or the U.S. Embassy has shared concrete information with the Mexican Central Authority on the child's whereabouts.

If the whereabouts of an abducted or wrongfully retained child cannot be established, for whatever reason, Mexican courts return the case file to the Mexican Central Authority, which in turn refers the case to Mexican law enforcement. The U.S. Central Authority is not aware of even a single case in which Mexican law enforcement, once the Mexican Central Authority forwarded a Convention case to them, located the children.

Those cases that do result in a court hearing face further obstacles, including lengthy court delays. Lack of implementing legislation to integrate the Convention into the Mexican legal system remains a problem. The amparo (a special appeal claiming a violation of an individual's constitutional rights) has been used by taking parents to block Convention proceedings indefinitely pending a ruling by another court as to whether the parent's constitutional rights have been violated. In addition, Mexican courts are able to reconsider at any stage of the proceedings factual determinations made by lower courts, producing additional delay. Both problems highlight the degree to which the lack of implementing legislation in Mexico has hampered the convention's effectiveness.

Another problem (also compounded by the absence of implementing legislation) is the apparent lack of understanding by many judges in Mexico of the law of the convention. Mexican judges frequently seem to ignore the fact that a case before them arises out of a return application under the convention, and instead simply apply the procedural and substantive law that would govern a Mexican custody dispute. The result is almost always that those courts deny return without evaluating the merits of the application under the law of the convention. U.S. Embassy officials report that the Mexican Central Authority has taken some preliminary steps to address this problem. The Mexican Central Authority actively participated in June 2003 in a conference hosted by the U.S. Embassy to educate family law judges about the Hague Convention. The Mexican Central Authority has also started to contact judges it believes may be presiding over a Convention case for the first time to provide support and guidance, and, in particular, to emphasize the distinction between the court's role in Convention cases and its role in domestic custody determinations.

Mexican Central Authority officials discuss the convention with the judiciary and attorneys, monitor proceedings, and provide the U.S. Embassy with updates on active case processing. However, the Mexican government dedicates limited resources to the Mexican Central Authority, including insufficient staff to handle the volume of cases. The Mexican Central Authority's ability to help bring about successful resolution of individual cases involving children taken from the U.S. is correspondingly limited. U.S. Embassy officials meet monthly with Mexican Central Authority personnel to obtain updates on pending cases but, even with regular and continued embassy involvement, the Mexican Central Authority clearly is overburdened. Improvement in this area seems unlikely unless the Mexican government commits more resources to the Central Authority.

2002-2003 Compliance Report: "Noncompliant"

Mexico remains the destination country of the greatest number of children parentally abducted from the United States. In the 2000 and 2001 reports Mexico was listed as "not fully compliant" due to its serious efforts to better meet its Convention responsibilities. Mexico's performance since the 2001 report, however, has deteriorated significantly, to the point that Mexico is now non-compliant.

Systemic problems continue to delay resolution of cases. These problems include: the Mexican Central Authority's lack of adequate resources, the lack of implementing legislation integrating the Convention into the Mexican legal system, and an apparent lack of understanding of the Convention among the judiciary.

The lack of resources including personnel resulted in difficulties in communication between the Office of Children's Issues in the Bureau of Consular Affairs, which acts as the United States Central Authority (USCA), and the Mexican Central Authority (MCA). Communication began to improve in May 2002 when monthly meetings to discuss cases began between the MCA and the consular section at the United States Embassy in Mexico.

Lack of resources may have contributed to the increase in the number of cases still active more than 18 months after filing with the MCA. In the present report there are 29 Mexican cases in this category compared with 18 in the 2001 Report.

The lack of implementing legislation integrating the Convention into the Mexican legal system remains a problem. The amparo (a special appeal claiming a violation of constitutional rights) has been used by taking parents to block Hague proceedings indefinitely. Six cases still active 18 months after filing had one or more amparos and 3 of those cases currently have amparos pending. One of the four cases resolved through the Convention process since the 2001 Report was published resulted in the denial of a return by the Mexican Supreme Court because six years had passed while the taking parent filed successive amparos after the original judge ordered the children returned.

In addition, the Mexican court's ability to reconsider the facts at any stage of the proceeding is a major area of concern and highlights the effect the lack of implementing legislation integrating the Convention into the Mexican legal system has had on the convention's effectiveness. In one long-standing case, the taking parent is raising again, now that the case has been returned to the trial court after appeal, defenses already adjudicated and rejected in the original trial proceeding.

Another systemic problem is the apparent lack of understanding of the convention's purpose and intent by many judges. The convention was not designed to address underlying custody issues. Those were meant to be dealt with by the courts in the country of the child's habitual residence, after the child has been returned. However, as noted above, the lack of implementing legislation has allowed judges to apply Mexican procedural and custody law in Hague cases to deny return when the only issues the court is supposed to examine are: (a) whether the child was "habitually resident" in another Hague state prior to the abduction or illegal retention; (b) whether the left-behind parent had some form of custodial rights at the time; and (c) whether those rights were being exercised.

The USCA has raised these issues with the MCA and the Embassy of Mexico in on-going meetings and conversations since the 2001 Report. The Assistant Secretary for Consular Affairs raised the issue of implementation of the Convention in a letter to the Mexican Ambassador in March 2002. In response, the MCA acknowledged the need to improve its implementation of the convention but other than improved communication no significant change has occurred. The Assistant Secretary for Consular Affairs raised our concerns about the implementation of the Convention in Mexico at the Binational Commission meetings in November 2002. The Binational Working Group agreed to work together to ensure passage of implementing legislation and to promote judicial training aimed at improving compliance with the convention. A group of Mexican judges and Central Authority officials visited Washington in December 2002 for a U.S. Government-arranged program focused on familiarization with Hague implementation in the U.S.

2001 Compliance Report: "Pattern of Non-Compliance"

From the United States. While systemic problems continue and a large number of cases remain unresolved, Mexico has shown impressive efforts to better meet its Convention responsibilities. As a result, it was moved from "noncompliant" status (1999 Report to Congress) to "not fully compliant" (2000 Report to Congress). Further progress has been shown since the last report; however, many cases remain unresolved 18 months after the filing of a Hague application. The September 2000 Compliance Report listed 18 such cases; twelve of these remain open. An additional six cases have been added to this report.

There remain several areas in which systemic problems appear to delay resolution of cases. Mexico has no implementing legislation integrating the Convention into the Mexican legal system. The convention, therefore, is implemented under existing state family code and varies from state to state. This lack of a legal structure facilitating the convention's operation is a major obstacle to the convention's effective implementation in Mexico. Significant processing delays have occurred in at least two of the states. However, one of these states has recently notified the Mexican Central Authority that the primary judicial concern delaying cases has been resolved and has pledged to process cases more expeditiously. The department is also encouraged by recent discussions with the Mexican Central Authority concerning plans for the development of implementing legislation.

Mexican law enforcement agencies have not consistently undertaken serious efforts to locate parentally abducted children. Location of the child remains undetermined for eight of the cases included in the September 2000 Compliance Report and in all six of the cases added to this report. In June 2000, Mexico passed a law making familial child abduction a federal crime and forming a federal police unit charged with investigating crimes against children, including the location of missing children. These recent actions may result in improved efforts to locate children.

Although not a problem in recent cases, the amparo (a special appeal claiming a violation of constitutional rights) has been used by taking parents to block Hague proceedings indefinitely and remains a problem in at least three long-term cases. Other judicial delays, such as judges not scheduling hearings in a timely manner, also have affected prompt case resolution.

Several of the cases cited above, and the issue of implementation of the Convention in general, were raised at the Binational Commission meetings in 1999 and 2000 and by the Ambassador in a discussion with a Foreign Ministry Under Secretary in February 2001. In addition, on-going meetings between Mexican and U.S. Central Authority officials have resulted in better communication, case updates, and case resolutions. At the March 2001 Hague Special Commission, the Department's Assistant Secretary for Consular Affairs and head of the U.S. delegation raised the cases and the systemic problems noted above with the Mexican delegation.

2000 Compliance Report: "Pattern of Non-Compliance"

MEXICO: Mexico was listed in the previous Compliance Report to Congress as noncompliant with its responsibilities under the convention. While systemic problems continue and a large number of cases remain unresolved, Mexico has shown impressive efforts to better meet its Convention responsibilities. Mexican and U.S. Central Authority officials have met four times to discuss better procedures for dealing with cases, resulting in better and more frequent communication and case updates. The Department of State is further encouraged by recent discussions with the Mexican Central Authority regarding plans by the Mexican foreign ministry to allocate additional resources to the program.

Twenty-five of the 34 cases listed in the previous Compliance Report have been closed, with approximately one-third resulting in the return of the children to the United States. There have been ten Hague court hearings since Fall 1999, with all children except one returned to the U.S. In one case, children were returned to the United States only six months after the abduction. In addition, there have been voluntary returns in more than 30 cases, with the existence of a pending Hague case a factor in the voluntary return decision. Once a child has been located, the taking parent must be notified of the hearing date. Mexico's new procedure of taking children into custody at that time has been very effective in ensuring that the taking parent does not go into hiding with the children.

Progress has occurred primarily in cases recently filed with the Mexican Central Authority. The six cases raised by the U.S. delegation in the Binational Commission meetings illustrate the delays in cases when the location of the child is not known and/or an amparo appeal (a provision of the Mexican Constitution where a claim is made that a civil right has been violated) is filed. There has been progress in one of those cases.

Mexico has no implementing legislation integrating the Convention into the Mexican legal system. This lack of a legal structure facilitating the convention's operation is a major obstacle to the convention's effective implementation in Mexico.

Most cases go a year or more without resolution. The Central Authority does not have law enforcement powers and must rely on federal and state police to locate children. Mexican law enforcement agencies do not consistently undertake serious efforts to locate parentally abducted children. In addition, the amparo has been abused by taking parents to block Hague proceedings indefinitely.

These concerns were raised at the 1999 Binational Commission (BNC) meeting, the 1999 follow-up meeting to the BNC, and the 2000 BNC meeting

1999 Compliance Report: "Noncompliant"

MEXICO: In view of the large number of unresolved applications for return of children from Mexico, 33 of the 56, the Department considers Mexico to have demonstrated a pattern of noncompliance with the obligations of the convention. Ongoing efforts by the Department of State to address Mexicos lack of compliance include: a meeting of the Director of the Office of Childrens Issues and the Mexican Central Authority in May 1997; attendance in January 1998 of a representative of the U.S. Central Authority at a binational meeting on child abduction organized by California's Attorney General's office and the Mexican Consulate in San Diego; a November 1998 meeting involving a representative of the United States Central Authority, the Mexican Central Authority and Mexican Foreign Ministry officials.

== See also ==
- Amber alert
- Human rights in Mexico
- Immigration and Customs Enforcement (ICE)
- International child abduction in Brazil
- International child abduction in Japan
- International child abduction in the United States
- Kidnapping
- Mexico – United States relations
- National Center for Missing and Exploited Children
- National Human Rights Commission (Mexico)
- Trafficking of children
