= United States Hague Abduction Convention Compliance Reports =

Reports on treaty compliance

The Hague Convention on the Civil Aspects of International Child Abduction, commonly referred to as the Hague Abduction Convention, is a multilateral treaty developed by the Hague Conference on Private International Law. The treaty provides an expeditious method of returning a child taken illegally from one country to another. It was concluded on October 25, 1980

As the US State Department would not voluntarily inform relevant actors about non-compliance of other countries in adhering to the convention, the US Congress enacted an annual reporting requirement obligating the State Department to publish a detailed annual report on the reliability and effectiveness of the Convention to protect and secure the return of abducted American children in foreign countries. It was hoped that the law would make available a unique and vitally important source of information to parents, courts, governments and attorneys worldwide.

The Compliance Reports have been issued for each year since 1999 with years 2002 and 2003 combined in a single report.

Initial reports were criticized for lack of information on what Congress sought. Over time the reporting of the US State Department improved until they began releasing a full accounting of the numbers of abductions reported to the State Department each year and the number of children recovered.

From 2014 the US State department also released annual action reports (and one 90 day action report).

== Latest reports ==
As of July 2025 the latest annual report to be released is for 2025.

As of July 2025 the latest annual action report to be released is for 2024.

== Congressional discord on reporting practices by the State Department ==
In April 1999, the US State Department, under congressional mandate, issued the 1999 Hague Compliance Report (1999 Report). Congress immediately, and harshly, criticized the State Department for violating nearly every paragraph of the law stating that State had violated their express intent in creating it.

Congress imposed additional reporting requirements for the 2000 Hague Compliance Report (2000 Report) in section 202 of H.R. 3194, the Omnibus Appropriations Act of 2000 declaring that State's April 1999 Report on the Abduction Convention had failed to provide information consistent with the intent of Congress in having a full accounting of cases and countries in violation of the Hague Convention and a listing of countries which were non-compliant with the Convention.

Before submission of the 2000 Report to Congress, the Chairman of the Committee on International Relations, Congressman Benjamin A. Gilman of New York, wrote Secretary of State Madeleine Albright to remind her that the 1999 Report had "engendered a high level of criticism because of shortcomings in meeting the intent of Congress in mandating this report" adding that the amended Hague compliance legislation "emphasized the aspects that are of most importance to the Congress, and to the American people, in addressing the many concerns we have heard on this subject from our citizens." In similar fashion, the Chair and Founder of the House Caucus on Missing and Exploited Children, Congressman Nick Lampson of Texas, also wrote Secretary Albright on September 15, 2000, to make it clear that "Congress takes this reporting requirement quite seriously" and express concern that "I have received word that the Department of State is considering submission of a 2000 report to Congress that I believe could be potentially more inaccurate and more incomplete with the statutory reporting requirements than the State Department's 1999 Report. Such a report would be unacceptable to Congress," and that, "I want to avoid any misunderstanding with the Department of State that might result in a deficient report and that would represent a step backward from the substantial efforts by Congress to improve compliance with the Hague Convention for the sake of American children and their parents, including major hearings by the Senate Foreign Relations (SFRC) and House International Relations Committees (HIRC), a unanimous Joint Resolution, statutory requirements to reform the Office of Children's Issues, the work of the Congressional Missing and Exploited Children's Caucus and individual senators and representatives, and a General Accounting Office investigation (showing very low return rates to the U.S. of abducted or retained American children)."

In regards to the Hague compliance report specifically, Lampson declared to Secretary Albright "I sincerely regret the two-year struggle with the State Department over this reporting requirement. Congressional efforts in 1999 to clarify, broaden, and extend the reporting requirements were made substantially more difficult by State Department opposition. Nevertheless, the legislation was substantially amended in ways that should eliminate the Department's violations of many paragraphs of the reporting requirement last year." Ignoring Congressional leaders, the US State Department issued the 2000 report in early October of that year and was still in blatant violation of five of the seven paragraphs in the amended reporting law.

== 2010 Compliance Report ==
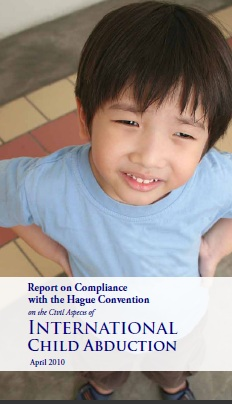
2010 Report Cover

The 2010 report covers the period from October 1, 2008, through September 30, 2009 (Fiscal Year of 2009.) During this period the US State Department received 1,135 new requests for assistance in the return of 1,621 children to the United States from other countries. In addition the State Department received 324 Convention applications involving 454 children abducted to the United States from Convention partners of the United States.

Abductions between Hague Convention partners
	Outgoing cases		Incoming cases	
Convention country	New cases	Number of children	New cases	Number of children
Argentina	10	11	8	12
Australia	16	29	14	22
Austria	4	5	4	6
Bahamas	7	8	7	12
Belgium	2	2	2	3
Belize	5	8	1	1
Bosnia-Herzegovina	1	1	2	5
Brazil	24	31	7	9
Bulgaria	6	6	0	0
Canada	74	104	29	39
Chile	4	5	5	6
Colombia	23	31	10	10
Costa Rica	11	13	3	5
Cyprus	1	2	0	0
Czech Republic	3	4	0	0
Denmark	1	2	4	7
Dominican Republic	16	21	8	10
Ecuador	18	24	4	7
El Salvador	13	16	3	3
Estonia	2	3	0	0
Finland	1	2	0	0
France	9	12	12	15
Germany	50	71	18	20
Greece	5	7	3	3
Guatemala	7	12	1	2
Honduras	18	26	1	2
Hungary	3	5	2	2
Iceland	1	1	0	0
Ireland	1	1	1	1
Israel	14	19	3	3
Italy	9	14	6	7
Macedonia	3	4	1	1
Mexico	309	474	75	120
Netherlands	4	7	7	10
New Zealand	7	9	1	1
Norway	5	7	1	1
Panama	10	16	2	3
Peru	10	14	7	7
Poland	14	17	2	2
Portugal	2	2	2	2
Romania	2	5	0	0
Slovakia	2	3	3	3
South Africa	12	13	7	11
Spain	8	9	6	7
Sweden	6	10	5	7
Switzerland	6	8	5	10
Turkey	4	6	2	2
Ukraine	2	4	4	5
Uruguay	3	4	1	1
Venezuela	10	15	4	5
Totals	828	1194	324	488

Abductions between non-convention countries
	Outgoing cases	
Non-convention country	Number of new cases	Number of children
Algeria	1	1
Bangladesh	5	7
Barbados	3	3
Belarus	1	1
Bolivia	3	3
Cambodia	1	1
China	9	9
Egypt	12	18
Ethiopia	3	3
Ghana	12	17
Guinea	1	1
Guyana	3	3
Haiti	5	8
India	34	41
Iraq	5	8
Jamaica	16	20
Japan	23	34
Jordan	12	23
Kenya	9	10
Lebanon	6	8
Malaysia	2	3
Morocco	7	8
Netherlands Antilles	1	2
Nicaragua	6	8
Nigeria	9	14
Pakistan	14	24
Philippines	20	25
Russia	16	21
Saudi Arabia	5	12
Senegal	2	3
Sierra Leone	4	4
Singapore	3	5
South Korea	6	7
Syria	5	8
Taiwan	3	6
Thailand	4	4
The Gambia	4	6
Trinidad and Tobago	9	14
Tunisia	4	5
United Arab Emirates	7	9
West Bank	1	3
Yemen	4	9
Zambia	1	1
Totals	307	427

The report also included a summary of the State Department's efforts to resolve 81 unresolved applications for the return of abducted American children under the Convention from 18 treaty partner countries that remained unresolved in spite of having been prior to April 1, 2008.

Countries with unresolved applications filed before April 1, 2008
Country	Number unresolved
Argentina	1
Austria	1
Bermuda	1
Brazil	7
Canada	1
Colombia	1
Czech Republic	1
Ecuador	1
France	1
Greece	1
Honduras	1
Israel	2
Mexico	53
New Zealand	1
Spain	1
Switzerland	3
Turkey	1
Venezuela	1

In a sharp departure from previous practice the State Department listed three countries as not compliant and only one country as "Demonstrating Patterns of Noncompliance," whereas, in the 2009 report, it listed seven countries in the latter category. Commenting on this "astonishing" occurrence, international family law authority Jeremy Morley noted

Does this mean that our treaty partners are becoming more compliant with the terms of the treaty? Or that the State Department is backing off from criticising other countries in this regard? I wish it were the former but suspect that it is the latter."

The report itself did not explain or acknowledge this dramatic shift in the status of "Country Noncompliance Placement."

Countries not compliant Brazil Honduras Mexico	Countries Demonstrating Patterns of Noncompliance Bulgaria

== 2009 Compliance Report ==
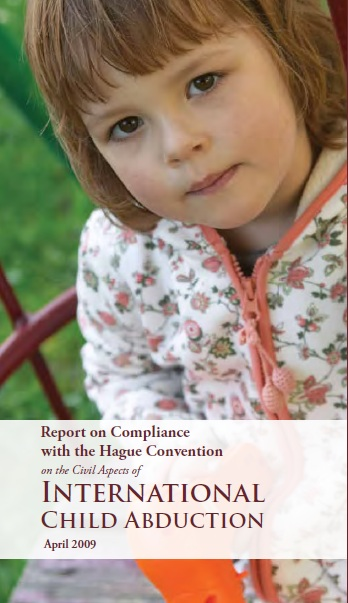
2009 Report Cover

The 2009 report covers the period from October 1, 2007, through September 30, 2008 (Fiscal Year 2008.) During this period the United States Department of State was notified of 1,082 new outgoing IPCA cases involving 1,615 children. Of these, 776 were abductions to Convention partner countries. Additionally State received 344 Convention applications concerning abductions to the United States involving 484 children.

Top ten destinations for abducted American children in 2009
	Outgoing cases	
Convention country	Number of new Cases	Number of children
Mexico	316	533
Canada	57	83
United Kingdom	41	52
Japan	37	57
India	35	45
Germany	34	49
Dominican Republic	25	39
Brazil	21	25
Australia	18	26
Colombia	17	22

As in years 2007 and 2008 the report included Honduras as fully "Not Compliant" with a list of countries "Demonstrating Patterns of Noncompliance."

Countries Not Compliant Honduras	Countries Demonstrating Patterns of Noncompliance Brazil Chile Greece Mexico Slovakia Switzerland Venezuela

== 2008 Compliance Report ==
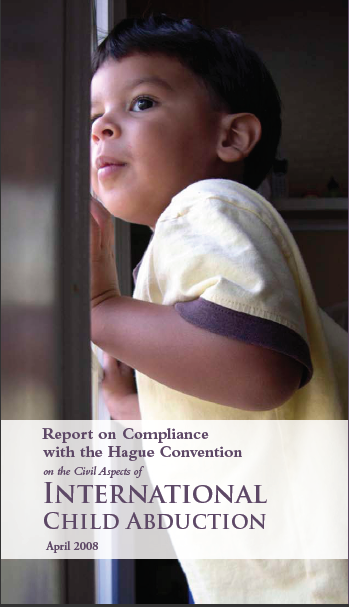
2008 Report Cover

Countries Not Compliant Honduras	Countries Demonstrating Patterns of Noncompliance Brazil Bulgaria Chile Ecuador Germany Greece Mexico Poland Venezuela

== 2007 Compliance Report ==
2007 Report Cover

Countries Not Compliant Honduras	Countries Demonstrating Patterns of Noncompliance Brazil Bulgaria Chile Colombia Germany Greece Mexico Poland

== 2006 Compliance Report ==
Noncompliant Countries Austria Ecuador Honduras Mauritius Venezuela	Countries Not Fully Compliant Brazil Chile Colombia Greece Mexico Panama Turkey	Countries of Concern Hungary Poland Romania Spain The Bahamas	Enforcement Problems Germany Israel Poland Sweden Switzerland

== 2005 Compliance Report ==
Noncompliant Countries Austria Colombia Ecuador Honduras Mauritius Panama Turkey	Countries Not Fully Compliant Chile Greece Mexico	Countries of Concern Hungary Poland Romania Switzerland The Bahamas	Enforcement Problems France Germany Greece Israel Poland Spain Sweden Switzerland

== 2004 Compliance Report ==
Noncompliant Countries Austria Colombia Ecuador Honduras Mauritius Mexico Turkey	Countries Not Fully Compliant Romania Switzerland	Countries of Concern Greece Hungary Israel Panama Poland The Bahamas	Enforcement Problems Germany Israel Poland Spain Sweden Switzerland

== 2002 and 2003 Compliance Report ==
Noncompliant Countries Austria Honduras Mauritius Mexico Panama	Countries Not Fully Compliant Switzerland	Countries of Concern The Bahamas Colombia Germany Poland Spain	Enforcement Problems Germany Israel Spain Switzerland

== 2001 Compliance Report ==
Noncompliant Countries Austria Honduras Mauritius Panama	Countries Not Fully Compliant Mexico	Countries of Concern The Bahamas Colombia Germany Poland Spain Sweden Switzerland

== 2000 Compliance Report ==
Noncompliant Countries Austria Honduras Mauritius Panama	Countries Not Fully Compliant Germany Mexico Sweden	Countries of Concern Colombia Poland Switzerland	Enforcement Problems Canada Germany Israel Spain Switzerland

== 1999 Compliance Report ==
Noncompliant Countries
Austria
Honduras
Mauritius
Mexico
Sweden

== See also ==
- Office of Children's Issues
- Hague Convention on the Civil Aspects of International Child Abduction
- Hague Convention 1996
- Human rights
- International child abduction in Mexico
- International child abduction in Brazil
- International child abduction in Japan
- Trafficking of children
- United States' Country Reports on Human Rights Practices
