= Chinese nationality =

Chinese nationality may refer to:

- Chinese nationality law, the law which defines who is or may become a People's Republic of China (PRC) national
  - Hong Kong Special Administrative Region passport, passport issued to PRC nationals with permanent residence in Hong Kong
  - Macao Special Administrative Region passport, passport issued to PRC nationals with permanent residence in the Macau
- Taiwanese nationality law, the law which defines who is or may become a Republic of China (ROC) national
- Zhonghua minzu ("Chinese Volk"), a key political term in modern Chinese history
- Chinese nationalism, form of nationalism which promotes the cultural and national unity of the Chinese
- Chinese people, the various individuals or groups of people associated with China
- Chinese Nation, a thought experiment in the philosophy of mind

== See also ==
- British nationality law and Hong Kong, British legal treatment of subjects from Hong Kong
- Ethnic minorities in China, the non-Han Chinese population in the People's Republic of China
- List of ethnic groups in China
