= Uniform Child Custody Jurisdiction and Enforcement Act =

United States act drafted in 1997

The Uniform Child Custody Jurisdiction and Enforcement Act (UCCJEA) is a Uniform Act drafted by the National Conference of Commissioners on Uniform State Laws in 1997. The UCCJEA has since been adopted by 49 U.S. States, the District of Columbia, Guam, Puerto Rico and the U.S. Virgin Islands. As of 2026, the only state that has not adopted the UCCJEA is Massachusetts. The Massachusetts state senate passed the UCCJEA in July 2025, but the Massachusetts state house of representatives did not pass it by the end of the year.

== Determination of jurisdiction ==
The UCCJEA vests "exclusive [and] continuing jurisdiction" for child custody litigation in the courts of the child's "home state," which is defined as the state where the child has lived with a parent for six consecutive months before the commencement of the proceeding (or since birth for children younger than six months). If the child has not lived in any state for at least six months, then a court in a state that has (1) "significant connections" with the child and at least one parent and (2) "substantial evidence concerning the child's care, protection, training, and personal relationships" may assume child-custody jurisdiction. If more than one state has "significant connections" and "substantial evidence...", the courts of those states must communicate and determine which state has the most significant connections to the child.

A court that has made a child-custody determination consistent with UCCJEA has exclusive, continuing jurisdiction over the determination until either

1. that court determines that neither the child, the child's parents, nor any person acting as a parent has a significant connection with the State that made the original order and that substantial evidence is no longer available in the State concerning the child's care, protection, training, and personal relationships, or
2. that court or a court of another State determines that the child, the child's parents, and any person acting as a parent do not reside in the State that initially made the child custody order.

== Uniform Child Custody Jurisdiction Act (UCCJA) ==
A previous Uniform Act, the Uniform Child Custody Jurisdiction Act, set out jurisdiction rules for initial custody determinations inconsistent with the federal Parental Kidnapping Prevention Act. Additionally, there were contradictory interpretations of the PKPA. The UCCJEA corrects these problems and adds uniform procedures to register and enforce child custody orders across state lines.

== Initial custody determination ==
To determine which state has proper jurisdiction to make an "initial determination" of child custody, the UCCJEA proceeds in the following order of priority:

1. The state which is the "home state" of the child, or was the child's home state within six months immediately before the commencement of child custody proceedings if the child is absent from the state, but a parent or person acting as a parent continues to live in the state;
2. If no state has jurisdiction under #1, then jurisdiction is proper where the child and at least one parent have a significant connection with the state (other than mere presence), and substantial evidence concerning the custody determination is available in the state;
3. If no state has jurisdiction under #1 or #2 above, jurisdiction is proper in any state having an appropriate connection with the child.

A state having jurisdiction under #1 or #2 above may decline to exercise its jurisdiction, and transfer it to another state if it is more convenient for the parties, or if one of the parties has engaged in misconduct necessitating a change.

"Home state" is defined as the "state in which a child lived with a parent or a person acting as a parent for at least six consecutive months immediately before the commencement of a child-custody proceeding. In the case of a child less than six months of age, the term means the state in which the child lived from birth with any of the persons mentioned. A period of temporary absence of any of the mentioned persons is part of the period."

For example, young Chris has lived in Iowa with his mother and father for the last three years. If the mother moves to Minnesota, but Chris remains in Iowa, then Minnesota will not have jurisdiction to determine custody over Chris. Iowa is the only state that can determine custody at this point.

The initial order under this determination refers to the first order concerning a child's custody.

== Exclusive, Continuing jurisdiction ==
Once a state court has made a custody determination, that state keeps jurisdiction over all matters concerning that child, unless:

1. A court of the state with jurisdiction determines that the child or the child and a parent do not have a significant connection with the state, AND evidence concerning the child's custody determination is not available in the state; OR
2. A court of the state with jurisdiction, or any other state, determines that the child and both parents or acting parents do not reside in the state any longer.

For an example of #1, the parents divorce in Texas, and the mother and children move to Mississippi. The father continues to live in Texas and the children maintain a significant connection to Texas by visiting Texas often and spending their summers there. Three years later the father filed suit in Texas to modify custody. The mother attempts to transfer jurisdiction to Mississippi. The UCCJEA, which was designed to prevent forum shopping, prevents her attempt by protecting an issuing court's jurisdiction that made an initial child custody determination unless: ..." or... the child's parents, and any person acting as a parent do not presently reside in this state".

For example in #2, the parents divorce in Texas, the mother and children move to Mississippi, Father moves to California. Because the children and both parents no longer live in Texas, the courts of Texas will have lost their exclusive, continuing jurisdiction to modify their custody orders. For most practical purposes, that means that jurisdiction to modify those orders will most likely not be in Texas, but, rather, in the state where the children and at least one parent have taken up residence, here, Mississippi.

== Modification of custody determination ==
Once a custody determination has been made, a court of another state does not have authority to modify the determination, unless the state with jurisdiction determines that it does not have jurisdiction as noted above, or any state court determines that the child, parents and any acting parents do not reside in the state which has jurisdiction.

To continue with the example of an initial custody determination above, let us say that Chris's father gets custody of Chris in the Iowa courts, and the mom moves to Arkansas. If Chris spends the summer with his mom in Arkansas, his mom cannot go to the Arkansas courts and attempt to modify custody - Iowa has continuing jurisdiction.

== Emergency orders ==
A state that does not otherwise have jurisdiction may enter a temporary emergency order if the child is in danger and needs immediate protection. After issuing such an order, the state court should determine if there is an existing custody order from another state in effect. If there is an existing order, the emergency court must allow a reasonable time for the parties to return to the state having jurisdiction, and argue the issues to the court with jurisdiction.

If there is no previous child custody order in existence, the emergency court's order will remain in effect until a determination is made in a court having "home state" jurisdiction over the child. If no determination is made, and the emergency court's state becomes the home state of the child, the emergency order becomes a final determination of custody.

== Massachusetts Child Custody Jurisdiction Act ==
Massachusetts is the only state that has not adopted the UCCJEA. Massachusetts follows the Massachusetts Child Custody Jurisdiction Act (MCCJA), under M.G.L. c. 209B.

== See also ==
- Hague Adoption Convention
