= Hague Convention =

Hague Convention may refer to:

- Hague Conventions of 1899 and 1907, among the first formal statements of the laws of war and war crimes in international law, signed July 1899 and October 1907
- the First International Opium Convention, the first international drug control treaty, sometimes referred to as the Hague Convention of 1912, signed January 1912
- League of Nations Codification Conference, 1930
- Convention on Certain Questions Relating to the Conflict of Nationality Laws, 1930
- Hague Convention for the Protection of Cultural Property in the Event of Armed Conflict, signed May 1954
- Convention for the Suppression of Unlawful Seizure of Aircraft, 1970
- Conventions concluded in the framework of the Hague Conference on Private International Law
  - Hague Civil Procedure Convention (1954)
  - Hague Convention Abolishing the Requirement of Legalisation for Foreign Public Documents (Apostille Convention), signed October 1961
  - Hague Service Convention, signed November 1965
  - Hague Evidence Convention, signed March 1970
  - Hague Convention on Foreign Judgments in Civil and Commercial Matters, signed February 1971
  - Hague Convention on the Civil Aspects of International Child Abduction, signed October 1980
  - Hague Convention on the Law Applicable to Trusts and on their Recognition, signed July 1985
  - Hague Adoption Convention, signed May 1993
  - Hague parental responsibility and the protection of children Convention, signed October 1996
  - Hague Choice of Court Convention, signed in 2005
  - Hague Securities Convention, signed July 2006
  - Hague Maintenance Convention, signed in 2007

== See also ==
- List of Hague Conventions on Private International Law
- Hague Agreement (disambiguation)
- Hague Tribunal (disambiguation)
- Treaty of The Hague (disambiguation)
