= List of Hague Conventions on Private International Law =

This is a list of Conventions signed at The Hague by member states of the Hague Conference on Private International Law.

== Conventions adopted before 1945 ==
- Convention of 12 June 1902 relating to the settlement of the conflict of the laws concerning marriage
- Convention of 12 June 1902 relating to the settlement of the conflict of laws and jurisdictions as regards divorce and separation
- Convention of 12 June 1902 relating to the settlement of guardianship of minors
- Convention of 17 July 1905 relating to civil procedure
- Convention of 17 July 1905 relating to conflicts of laws with regard to the effects of marriage on the rights and duties of the spouses in their personal relationship and with regard to their estates
- Convention of 17 July 1905 relating to deprivation of civil rights and similar measures of protection

== Conventions ==
1. Statute of the Hague Conference on Private International Law
2. Convention of 1 March 1954 on civil procedure
3. Convention of 15 June 1955 on the law applicable to international sales of goods
4. Convention of 15 April 1958 on the law governing transfer of title in international sales of goods
5. Convention of 15 April 1958 on the jurisdiction of the selected forum in the case of international sales of goods
6. Convention of 15 June 1955 relating to the settlement of the conflicts between the law of nationality and the law of domicile
7. Convention of 1 June 1956 concerning the recognition of the legal personality of foreign companies, associations and institutions
8. Convention of 24 October 1956 on the law applicable to maintenance obligations towards children
9. Convention of 15 April 1958 concerning the recognition and enforcement of decisions relating to maintenance obligations towards children
10. Convention of 5 October 1961 concerning the powers of authorities and the law applicable in respect of the protection of minors
11. Convention of 5 October 1961 on the Conflicts of Laws relating to the Form of Testamentary Dispositions
12. Convention of 5 October 1961 Abolishing the Requirement of Legalisation for Foreign Public Documents
13. Convention of 15 November 1965 on Jurisdiction, Applicable Law and Recognition of Decrees Relating to Adoptions
14. Convention of 15 November 1965 on the Service Abroad of Judicial and Extrajudicial Documents in Civil or Commercial Matters
15. Convention of 25 November 1965 on the Choice of Court
16. Convention of 1 February 1971 on the Recognition and Enforcement of Foreign Judgments in Civil and Commercial Matters
17. Supplementary Protocol of 1 February 1971 to the Convention on the Recognition and Enforcement of Foreign Judgments in Civil and Commercial Matters
18. Convention of 1 June 1970 on the Recognition of Divorces and Legal Separations
19. Convention of 4 May 1971 on the Law Applicable to Traffic Accidents
20. Convention of 18 March 1970 on the Taking of Evidence Abroad in Civil or Commercial Matters
21. Convention of 2 October 1973 concerning the International Administration of the Estates of Deceased Persons
22. Convention of 2 October 1973 on the Law Applicable to Products LiabilityConvention on the Law Applicable to Products Liability
23. Convention of 2 October 1973 on the Recognition and Enforcement of Decisions relating to Maintenance Obligations
24. Convention of 2 October 1973 on the Law Applicable to Maintenance Obligations
25. Convention of 14 March 1978 on the Law Applicable to Matrimonial Property Regimes
26. Convention of 14 March 1978 on Celebration and Recognition of the Validity of Marriages
27. Convention of 14 March 1978 on the Law Applicable to Agency
28. Convention of 25 October 1980 on the Civil Aspects of International Child Abduction
29. Convention of 25 October 1980 on International Access to Justice
30. Convention of 1 July 1985 on the Law Applicable to Trusts and on their Recognition
31. Convention of 22 December 1986 on the Law Applicable to Contracts for the International Sale of Goods
32. Convention of 1 August 1989 on the Law Applicable to Succession to the Estates of Deceased Persons
33. Convention of 29 May 1993 on Protection of Children and Co-operation in respect of Intercountry Adoption
34. Convention of 19 October 1996 on Jurisdiction, Applicable Law, Recognition, Enforcement and Co-operation in respect of Parental Responsibility and Measures for the Protection of Children
35. Convention of 13 January 2000 on the International Protection of Adults
36. Convention of 5 July 2006 on the Law Applicable to Certain Rights in respect of Securities held with an Intermediary
37. Convention of 30 June 2005 on Choice of Court Agreements
38. Convention of 23 November 2007 on International Recovery of Child Support and Other Forms of Family Maintenance
39. Protocol of 23 November 2007 on the Law Applicable to Maintenance Obligations
40. Principles on Choice of Law in International Commercial Contracts
41. Convention of 2 July 2019 on the Recognition and Enforcement of Foreign Judgments in Civil or Commercial Matters
