= International child abduction =

Form of human trafficking

The term international child abduction is generally synonymous with international parental kidnapping, child snatching, and child stealing.

In private international law the term usually refers to the illegal removal of children from their home by an acquaintance or family member to a foreign country. In this context, "illegal" is normally taken to mean "in breach of custodial rights" and "home" is defined as the child's habitual residence. As implied by the "breach of custodial rights," the phenomenon of international child abduction generally involves an illegal removal that creates a jurisdictional conflict of laws whereby multiple authorities and jurisdictions could conceivably arrive at seemingly reasonable and conflicting custodial decisions with geographically limited application.

Abduction by a parent often affects a child's access and connection to half their family and may cause the loss of their former language, culture, name and nationality, it violates numerous children's rights, and can cause psychological and emotional trauma to the child and family left behind. The harmful consequences for children and families have been shown in several studies and child abduction has been characterized as a form of parental alienation and child abuse. The modern day ease of international travel and corollary increase in international marriages is leading to a rapid rise in the number of international child abductions.

== International parental child abduction ==
International parental child abduction occurs when one parent unlawfully takes (or retains) a minor child in a country other than the one the child has his/her habitual residence. If that country is a party to the Hague Convention on the Civil Aspects of International Child Abduction (applicable to children under 16), then the child will usually be returned to the country of origin. If there is a conflict of law between two countries, the guardian must follow the laws of the country where the child physically present. It is very common that a parent that has legal custody of the child in the country where the child physically present, is wanted for parental abduction in another country. In such cases the child cannot be removed from the country where the child physically present, before child custody ends at age 18, because otherwise the child will not be returned to the taking parent.

=== Origin of the term ===
What is today called "parental kidnapping," "international child abduction", "parental child abduction" and "parental child trafficking" has existed as long as different legal jurisdictions and international borders have—though often under different names. None of these names achieved the modern day broad acceptance of terms like international child abduction. Lacking a common set of terminology or specifically designed laws to address the, at the time, poorly defined problem, researchers on the history of cross-border child abduction must search for terms like "custodial interference," "contempt of child custody orders," "legal kidnapping" or, in cases where children were viewed more as property than as individual subjects of rights, name variations on theft, child-maintenance debt and smuggling, among others.

Lawmakers struggled to typify and discuss international child abduction and discussions at the Hague Conference on Private International Law noted that, what some were referring to with variations on "legal kidnapping," was an oxymoron since that which is legal cannot be kidnapping and that which is kidnapping cannot be legal. The response to these concerns was the coining of the term "international child abduction." The terms first prominent use was in the title of the 1980 Hague Convention on the Civil Aspects of International Child Abduction. The term is not, however, used anywhere in the actual text of the convention itself in preference of the more technical terms "wrongful removal" or "wrongful retention" which were better suited for describing the mechanics of the Convention's system. The use of the term is now widespread in international law.

=== Internationalization of family law ===
In all family law disputes a determination must be made as to which legal systems and laws should be applied to the dispute. This question becomes much more complicated when aspects, or parties, of the case occur in, or hail from, multiple legal jurisdictions.

Today's international family law norms were heavily influenced by the concepts of domicile and nationality. In Europe these ideas were refined during the nineteenth century by Italian politician, Pasquale Mancini, who believed matters of personal status were to be governed by the nationality of the person. During the same period in the US and Latin America the prevailing principle was that jurisdiction over personal matters was determined by domicile which, in the Americas, was acquired immediately upon moving to a foreign jurisdiction even if neither citizenship nor nationality were acquired.

Starting in the late eighteenth century until the early 1920s a number of efforts were made to develop a series of international treaties governing international conflicts of law in Europe. Treaties that favored nationality as the determining jurisdictional factor either never got off the ground, were not widely signed or had substantial practical problems with countries renouncing them after signing. At the same time the inter-American system in Latin America produced the Bustamante Code of 1928 and the Montevideo Conventions of 1939 and 1940. Of particular note in these later Conventions was the introduction of a definition of "domicile" that started with a reference to the "habitual residence" for civil status. Lessons learned in prior efforts to create successful multilateral treaties culminated in a number of successful treaties in the mid-1900s, such as the 1961 Convention on the Protection of Minors, the New York Convention of 1956 on the Recovery Abroad of Maintenance drafted under the auspices of the United Nations, and the Hague Convention of 1961 concerning the powers of authorities and the law applicable in respect of the protection of minors ("1961 Convention.")

The 1961 Convention brought an innovation in terminology by creating a compromise between advocates of "nationality" as the determining factor for jurisdiction and advocates for the modern fact-centric model of "habitual residence." It also included expanded language to encompass both judicial and administrative authorities in response to the Boll case, in which Sweden claimed its public administrative law was exempt from the 1902 Convention on the Guardianship of minors because it only governed domestic private judicial law and not public administrative law. The 1961 Convention also emphasized the concept of the "interests of the child" as a basis for authorities of the child's nationality to overrule the authorities of the child's habitual residence. Of particularly special note, the drafters of the 1961 Convention expressly considered a provision addressing the removal of a child from their habitual residence with an intent to evade rightful jurisdiction—primarily for child custody reasons. This first attempt to codify international child abduction failed due to an inability to agree on a definition or manner of describing the phenomenon, with a number of countries that adhered to the principle of nationality regulating personal child and family law unable to classify their nationals removing children from foreign countries to their home state as fraudulent evasion.

In actual cases of international child abduction, this lack of a specific provision on child abduction in the 1961 treaty resulted in countries regularly interpreting the "habitual residence" concept of the Convention in a manner that allowed parents to take children to a foreign country and immediately acquire "habitual residence." This allowed judicial forum shopping and created perverse incentives for removing children from their homes to foreign jurisdictions in order to game the family law system and obtain a more favorable custodial outcome than could be gained in the jurisdiction of the child's home.

In the 1970s, dissatisfaction with these results led to efforts to create conventions on the foreign recognition and enforcement of judgments to make it harder for courts to favor a parent solely because that parent is a national suing in his or her home state. Canada also proposed that the Hague Conference work on a Convention to address what it termed "legal kidnapping." The Hague received Canada's request enthusiastically and, inspired by a Swiss proposal originally submitted at the Council of Europe in 1976 coined a new term in international family law – "international child abduction." Although the problem of international child abduction was well understood, finding a way to address the problem in practice was exceedingly difficult, but the Swiss proposal had a solution that was elegant in its simplicity. Why not simply restore the status quo ante?

==== The Hague Convention on the Civil Aspects of International Child Abduction ====
Hague Child Abduction Convention
Convention on the Civil Aspects of International Child Abduction
- State parties to the convention states that signed and ratified the convention states that acceded to the convention state that ratified, but convention has not entered into force
- Signed: 25 October 1980
- Location: The Hague, Netherlands
- Effective: 1 December 1983
- Parties: 101 (October 2020)
- Depositary: Ministry of Foreign Affairs of the Kingdom of the Netherlands
- Languages: French and English

Full text
- Convention on the Civil Aspects of International Child Abduction at Wikisource

In 1980 the Hague Conference drafted a convention to address the problem of international child abduction: the Hague Convention on the Civil Aspects of International Child Abduction – commonly referred to as the Abduction Convention. The Swiss idea of restoring the status quo ante after a "wrongful removal" or "wrongful retention" became a mainstay of the Abduction Convention. Under the convention, an application could be made for the return of a child who had been wrongfully removed or retained so long as the applicant possessed rights of custody, and provided that those rights were being "actually exercised" at the time of the abduction. The concept of "actually exercised" in reference to custodial rights itself was an innovation in terminology. Having met these requirements a child was to be returned "forthwith" except in exceptional circumstances.

Inspired by the Hague Evidence Convention and the Hague Service Convention's of 1965 and 1970, the Abduction Convention required the establishment of a single Central Authority in each country that would handle two-way communications with domestic courts, administrative agencies and foreign central authorities. Furthermore, each central authority was required to take "any and all actions" to secure the goals of the treaty and cooperate with other central authorities to do the same. All of these new obligations emphasized the need for international cooperation amongst state parties in achieving the objectives of the convention.

==== The United Nations Convention on the Rights of the Child ====
Established in 1989 the Convention on the Rights of the Child reflected the growing international consensus that children be viewed as a subject of rights and not merely as an object of rights or of protective action. The UNCRC roused an unprecedented response with 187 countries ratifying it within seven years forming an essential backdrop in international children's law. Article 11 of the Convention explicitly requires State Parties to combat the illicit transfer and retention of children and promote the conclusion of bilateral or multilateral agreements or accession to existing agreements that do so, Article 35 stipulates that "States Parties shall take all appropriate national, bilateral and multilateral measures to prevent the abduction, sale or traffic of children for any purpose or in any form."

Furthermore, at the Special Commissioner meeting held in Hague, Netherlands in 2023, Hague Conference reaffirmed the common goal of Hague convention and UNCRC, by making the following statement:

UN Committee on the Rights of the Child recognizes that the objectives of the 1980 Child Abduction Convention – prevention and immediate return – – seek to protect the best interests of the child. The SC furthermore observed that the Committee noted that the 1980 Child Abduction Convention establishes a strong presumption that the best interests of the child require that they be immediately returned save for the limited exceptions (IV-1-17) ...

These exceptions, however, must be applied restrictively. While the exceptions derive from a consideration of the interests of the child, they do not turn the return proceedings into custody proceedings (IV-1-15) ...

Exceptions are focussed on the (possible non-)return of the child. They should neither deal with issues of custody nor mandate a full “best interests assessment”(IV-1-14).

This was a meaningful statement after some countries such as the South Korean government ascribed the failure to comply with the Hague convention to "the Korean bylaw that stipulates a return order cannot be enforced when a child who is old enough to decide refuses to return to the US", also adding that "the failure in enforcement stems from cultural differences and a disparity in the legal systems between the US and Korea. "

==== The Hague Convention on Jurisdiction, Applicable Law, Recognition, Enforcement and Cooperation ====
The 1996 Convention on Jurisdiction, Applicable Law, Recognition, Enforcement and Co-operation in respect of Parental Responsibility and Measures is the third of the modern Hague Conventions on international family law, following in the footsteps of the Abduction Convention and the Adoption Convention. It is much broader in scope than the first two conventions and covers a wide range of civil measures related to the protection of children including: orders concerning parental responsibility and contact, public measures of protection or care, matters of legal representation and the protection of children's property.

The Convention has uniform rules determining which country's authorities are competent to take the necessary measures of protection. The Convention also determines which country's laws are to be applied and provides for the recognition and enforcement of measures taken in one Contracting State in all the other Contracting States. The co-operation provisions of the Convention provide the basic framework for the exchange of information and the necessary degree of collaboration between administrative authorities in the Contracting States. Reflecting an ever-increasing emphasis on the need for international cooperation as an essential element in the success of these measures the Convention has a full chapter on cooperation consisting of eleven articles.

Although initially slow to gain support and plagued with political problems, the number of states acceding to it has begun to grow.

=== Impact on society, families and children ===
Cover of a US report on International Child Abduction (2007)

As the result of the harmful effects on children, parental kidnapping has been characterized as a form of child abuse and an extreme form of parental alienation. Abducted children suffer emotionally and sometimes physically at the hands of their abducting parents. Many are told the other parent is dead or has abandoned them.

The extended support systems of abducting and victim parents can also become part of the dispute. Believing primarily one side of the abduction story, family, friends, and professionals in each parents individual country may lose their objectivity. As a result, protective concerns expressed by the abandoned parent may be viewed as undue criticism, interference, and histrionics preventing the victim parent from effectively relieving the trauma imposed on their innocent child by the abduction.

=== Mediation in child abduction cases ===
Mediation is a process during which abductors and the left behind family, assisted by mediator(s), attempt to resolve conflicts independent of the judicial system. Mediators create a constructive atmosphere for discussions and ensure fair dealings between parents. The mediators do not make decisions; instead, they confine themselves to assisting the parties in working out for themselves a fair and sensible solution to their problems. More specifically, the mediation can address not only the child's primary residence, but also the child's contact with both parents, visitation arrangements, agreements concerning the child's maintenance, schooling, further education, bi-cultural and bi-lingual upbringing, necessary arrangements for financial support etc.

Mediation can be helpful in international child abduction cases. In the context of mediation families can deal with the question of return and also find solutions to other issues relating to their children. The Hague Conference on Private International Law provides a Guide to Good Practice Child Abduction Convention: Part V - Mediation.

=== Legal justifications for abduction ===
International law has generally recognized that there may be extenuating circumstances where a child abduction may have been necessary or justifiable due to extenuating circumstances. The 1902 Convention on the Guardianship of minors limited such considerations to strictly emergency situations. Starting with the 1924 Declaration on the Rights of the Child and the 1959 United Nations Declaration on the Rights of the Child there was a growing recognition at the international level of the shift in nation's domestic laws away from parental authority and towards an emphasis on protecting the child, even from their own parents. This foreshadowed the 1989 UN Convention on the Rights of the Child and led to the establishment of exceptional circumstances in Article 13 of the Hague Abduction Convention where the removal of children would not be considered child abduction and allow the child to remain in their new country.

==== Abduction Convention: "Grave risks of harm" and "intolerable situations" ====
The principal purpose of the Abduction Convention is to cause the prompt return of a child to his or her "habitual residence." In certain exceptional cases under Article 13b, the court's mandatory return obligation is changed to a discretionary obligation, specifically, "the judicial or administrative authority of the requested State is not bound to order the return of the child if the person, institution or other body which opposes its return establishes that there is a grave risk that his or her return would expose the child to physical or psychological harm or otherwise place the child in an intolerable situation." The duty to return a child is not abrogated by a finding under Art. 13(b) but merely changes from mandatory to discretionary. Since the general intent of the Convention is to cause the return of a child to his or her "habitual residence," unless there are some powerful and compelling reasons otherwise the court is normally and routinely expected to exercise its discretion and return the child to his or her "habitual residence".

In the primary source of interpretation for the Convention, the Explanatory Report, Professor E. Perez-Vera noted the following:

it would seem necessary to underline the fact that the three types of exception to the rule concerning the return of the child must be applied only so far as they go and no further. This implies above all that they are to be interpreted in a restrictive fashion if the Convention is not to become a dead letter. In fact, the Convention as a whole rests upon the unanimous rejection of this phenomenon of illegal child removals and upon the conviction that the best way to combat them at an international level is to refuse to grant them legal recognition. The practical application of this principle requires that the signatory States be convinced that they belong, despite their differences, to the same legal community within which the authorities of each State acknowledge that the authorities of one of them – those of the child's habitual residence – are in principle best placed to decide upon questions of custody and access. As a result, a systematic invocation of the said exceptions, substituting the forum chosen by the abductor for that of the child's residence, would lead to the collapse of the whole structure of the Convention by depriving it of the spirit of mutual confidence which is its inspiration.

In spite of the spirit and intent of the Convention as conveyed by the Convention itself and further reinforced by the Perez-Vera report, Article 13b is frequently used by abductors as a vehicle to litigate the child's best interests or custody. Although Article 13(b) inquiries are not intended to deal with issues or factual questions appropriate for custody proceedings, many countries use article 13b to request psychological profiles, detailed evaluations of parental fitness, evidence concerning lifestyle and the nature and quality of relationships. These misinterpretations of the Abduction Convention's exceptions have rendered the Convention largely ineffective in accomplishing its objectives. The "best interests" of a child, which is explicitly never mentioned in the Convention, is an essentially subjective standard that judges often use to facilitate foreign nations' manipulation of the treaty and create a pretext for discretionary decisions. This discretion often takes the form of gender, cultural and national biases. The result is substantive non-compliance with the Abduction Convention.

==== Domestic violence ====
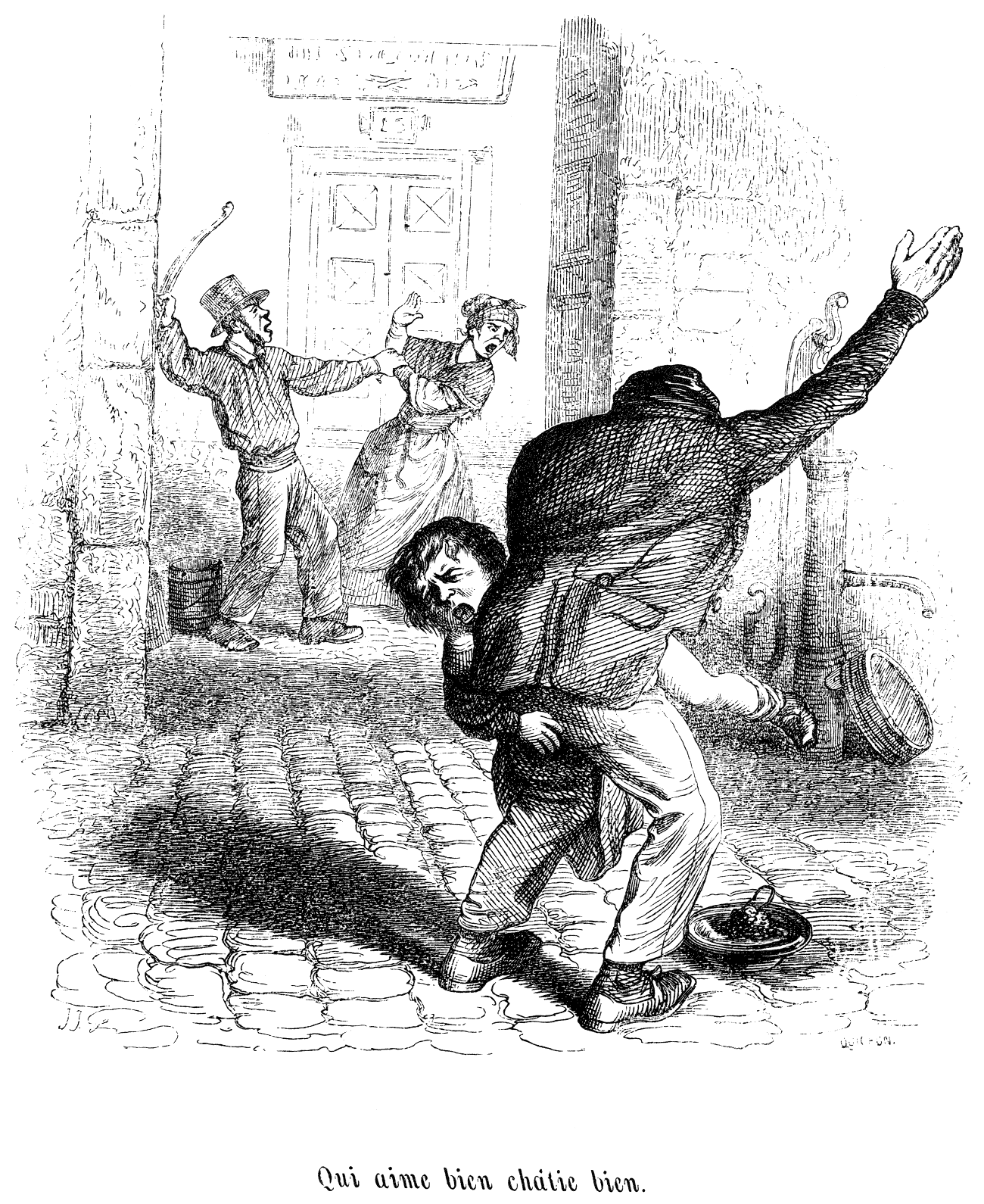
Domestic Violence

At the time the Hague Abduction Convention was drafted domestic violence was never explicitly considered as an affirmative defense for child abduction, although it may be brought as a defense under Article 13, if "there is a grave risk that his or her return would expose the child to physical or psychological harm or otherwise place the child in an intolerable situation." Article 13 supposed that the child's primary caretaker would abduct the child to escape the domestic violence of a non-custodial parent. At the time of the Conventions drafting, joint custody laws were rare. One parent was usually both the custodial parent and primary caretaker while the other, non-custodial parent had rights of access. The move towards joint custody laws conferred both the parent who acted as the primary caretaker and their ex-partner with custodial rights and, by extension, a right to request the return of children wrongfully removed from their place of habitual residence. In addition to not accounting for a shift in child custody law towards shared parenting and joint custody, according to Weiner, the framers of the Convention also did little to account for the motivation for abducting a child, generally assuming that all abductions were harmful to children; however, the child's primary caretaker may be fleeing with a child to protect himself or herself from a dangerous domestic situation.

== Global Missing Children’s Network ==
Launched in 1998 as a joint venture of the International Centre for Missing & Exploited Children (ICMEC) and the US National Center for Missing and Exploited Children, the Global Missing Children's Network (GMCN) is a network of countries that connect, share best practices, and disseminate information and images of missing children to improve the effectiveness of missing children investigations. The Network has 22 member countries: Albania, Argentina, Australia, Belarus, Belgium, Brazil, Canada, Germany, Greece, Ireland, Italy, Mexico, the Netherlands, New Zealand, Poland, Romania, Russia, Serbia, South Africa, South Korea, Spain, the United Kingdom, and the US.

Each country can access a customizable website platform, and can enter missing children information into a centralized, multilingual database that has photos of and information about missing children, which can be viewed and distributed to assist in location and recovery efforts. GMCN staff train new countries joining the Network, and provide an annual member conference at which best practices, current issues, trends, policies, procedures, and possible solutions are discussed.

== See also ==
- Child-selling
- Children in emergencies and conflicts
- Conflict of laws#International child abduction
- Extraterritorial jurisdiction
- Forum shopping#Child custody
- Hague Abduction Convention Compliance Reports
- Human rights
- International adoption
- Not Without My Daughter
- Trafficking of children

By country:

- International child abduction in Brazil
- International child abduction in Japan
- International child abduction in Mexico
- International child abduction in South Korea
- International child abduction in the United States
