= Treaty of The Hague =

The Treaty of The Hague (also known as the Treaty of Den Haag) may refer to:

- Treaty of The Hague (1433)—transferred Dutch territories of Jacqueline, Countess of Hainaut, to the Duke of Burgundy
- Treaty of The Hague (1603)
- Treaty of The Hague (1608)—France and the United Provinces of the Netherlands
- Treaty of The Hague (1614)—Sweden and the United Provinces of the Netherlands sign an alliance
- Treaty of The Hague (1625)—England and the Netherlands agreed to support Christian IV of Denmark economically
- Treaty of The Hague (1641)—the Dutch Republic and the Kingdom of Portugal established a truce and sign a Treaty of Offensive and Defensive Alliance
- Concert of The Hague (1659)—also First Concert of The Hague: Dutch Republic, England and France agree on a common stance regarding the Dano-Swedish conflict in the Second Northern War
- Treaty of The Hague (1661)—the Dutch Empire recognized Portuguese imperial sovereignty over Recife in Brazil
- Treaty of The Hague (1673)—defensive alliance between the Dutch and the Holy Roman Empire, Brandenburg-Prussia and Spain against France
- Treaty of The Hague (1674)—defensive alliance between the Holy Roman Empire, the Netherlands, Denmark-Norway and Spain against France and Sweden
- Treaty of The Hague (1698)—attempted to resolve the issue of who would inherit the Spanish throne (also known as the First Partition Treaty).
- Treaty of The Hague (1701)—England, Austria, the United Provinces, and the Holy Roman Empire established an alliance in order to keep France in check.
- Treaty of The Hague (1709)—also known as the first Barrier Treaty
- Concert of The Hague (1710)—also Second Concert of The Hague: the Holy Roman Emperor, England and the Dutch Republic agree on the neutrality of the Swedish provinces in Germany during the Great Northern War
- Treaty of The Hague (1720)—ended the War of the Quadruple Alliance
- Treaty of The Hague (1794)—between Great Britain, Netherlands and Prussia against France
- Treaty of The Hague (1795)—the Batavian Republic ceded territories to France
- Treaty of The Hague (1818)—between Great Britain and the Netherlands regarding prevention of the slave trade
- Treaty of The Hague (1895)—established the boundaries of British New Guinea
- Treaty of The Hague (1949)—granted independence from the Netherlands to Indonesia
- Treaty of The Hague (1983)—a plan for the Netherlands to grant independence to Aruba, later shelved

== See also ==
- List of treaties
- Hague Agreement (disambiguation)
- Hague Convention (disambiguation)
- Hague Tribunal (disambiguation)
