= Parsons & Whittemore Overseas Co. v. Societe Generale de L'Industrie du Papier =

- Court: United States Court of Appeals for the Second Circuit
- Full case name: Parsons & Whittemore Overseas Co. v. Societe Generale d L'Industrie du Papier (RAKTA)

Case history
- Appealed from: Southern District of New York

Court membership
- Judges sitting: Joseph Smith, Walter Roe Mansfield, Paul Raymond Hays

Case opinions
- Decision by: Joseph Smith

Parsons & Whittemore Overseas Co. v. Societe Generale d L'Industrie du Papier (RAKTA), 508 F.2d 969 (1974) is a United States Circuit Court Case in which the United States Court of Appeals for the Second Circuit held that although US courts can generally decide that arbitral judgments should not be enforced for public policy reasons, that exception should be construed very narrowly.

== Events preceding arbitration ==
In 1962, Parsons & Whittemore Overseas ("Overseas"), an American corporation, and Societe Generale de L'Industrie du Papier ("RAKTA"), an Egyptian corporation, entered in a contract governing the construction and operation of an Egyptian paper mill. The contract included an arbitration clause, which provided that differences arising in the course of performance would be arbitrated under International Chamber of Commerce (ICC) rules, and a force majeure clause, which excused delay in performance due to causes beyond Overseas' reasonable capacity to control.

Work proceeded as planned until May 1967, when hostility towards Americans engendered by the immanent Six-Day War caused the majority of the American work crew to leave Egypt. In June, the Egyptian government broke diplomatic ties with the United States, requiring any Americans wishing to stay in the county to apply for a special visa.

Overseas abandoned the almost completed project and informed RAKTA that it considered this delay excused by the force majeure clause. RAKTA, already at work completing the paper mill, disagreed. RAKTA exercised their option to initiate arbitration, and Overseas brought the case directly to a three-judge panel under ICC rules.

== Arbitration ==
The arbitral panel found that Overseas's force majeure defense was only applicable for roughly the first month after work had ceased. The panel found that Overseas had made no more than a perfunctory effort to acquire special visas and resume work. At the final judgement, Overseas was held liable to RAKTA for $312,507.45 in damages for breach of contract and $30,000 for RAKTA's costs, as well as three-fourths of the arbiters' compensation of $49,000.

== Enforcement proceedings ==
RAKTA sought to enforce this judgement against Overseas in the United States. The award was found enforceable on summary judgment by the Southern District of New York (Lloyd F. MacMahon, J.). Overseas appealed this decision to the Second Circuit.

== Argument ==
Overseas argued that: (i) the enforcement of the award would violate US public policy; (ii) the award represented a decision on matters not appropriate for arbitration; (iii) the Arbitral Tribunal denied Overseas an adequate opportunity to present its case; (iv) the award was predicated upon the resolution of issues outside the scope of the contractual agreement for arbitration, and (v) the award was in manifest disregard of the law.

== Holding ==
The Second Circuit (Joseph J. Smith) upheld the district court's decision and confirmed the award. In dismissing the first objection, the Court of Appeals held that the public policy provision of Article V(2)(b) of the New York Convention should be construed narrowly, and the enforcement of foreign arbitral awards should be denied only where enforcement would violate very basic notions of morality and justice in the forum state. As to the arbitrability of the claim, the court found that Article V(2)(a) did not preclude arbitration any time US foreign policy was somehow implicated in the dispute. The court further found no violation of due process under Article V(1)(b) of the convention and no excess of the tribunal's jurisdiction under V(1)(c). The court finally held that Overseas had not established grounds for a claim that the award was in manifest disregard of the law.
