= Hague Protection of Minors Convention =

1961multilateral convention

Hague Convention concerning the powers of authorities and the law applicable in respect of the protection of infants
- Drafted: 5 October 1961
- Location: The Hague, Netherlands
- Effective: 4 February 1969
- Condition: 3 ratifications
- Ratifiers: 14
- Depositary: Ministry of Foreign Affairs of the Kingdom of the Netherlands
- Languages: French

The Convention of 1961 Concerning the Powers of Authorities and the Law Applicable in Respect of the Protection of Infants, French: Convention du 5 octobre 1961 concernant la compétence des autorités et la loi applicable en matière de protection des mineurs, or Hague Protection of Minors Convention is a multilateral convention of the Hague Conference on Private International Law. The 1961 Convention emphasized the concept of the "interests of the child" as a basis for authorities of the child's nationality to overrule the authorities of the child's habitual residence. It built upon prior efforts to create successful multilateral treaties and brought an innovation in terminology by creating a compromise between advocates of "nationality" as the determining factor for jurisdiction and advocates for the modern fact-centric model of "habitual residence." The convention also included expanded language to encompass both judicial and administrative authorities in response to the Boll case (regarding the Hague Convention of 1902 relating to the settlement of guardianship of minors). Of particularly special note, the drafters of the 1961 Convention expressly considered a provision addressing the removal of a child from their habitual residence with an intent to evade rightful jurisdiction—primarily for child custody reasons. This first attempt to codify international child abduction failed due to an inability to agree on a definition or manner of describing the phenomenon, with a number of countries that adhered to the principle of nationality regulating personal child and family law unable to classify their nationals removing children from foreign countries to their home state as illegal.

== Contracting States ==
As of 2013, 14 states are parties to the convention, of which 13 are located in Europe.

- Austria
- China, People's Republic of (only Macao)
- France
- Germany
- Italy
- Latvia
- Lithuania
- Luxembourg
- Netherlands (including Aruba, Curaçao, Sint Maarten and the Caribbean Netherlands)
- Poland
- Portugal
- Spain
- Switzerland
- Turkey
