= Convention on Child Protection =

The Convention on Child Protection may refer to:

- Hague Convention on Parental Responsibility and Protection of Children
- Council of Europe Convention on the Protection of Children against Sexual Exploitation and Sexual Abuse
