= Boll case =

Boll Case
- Court: International Court of Justice
- Full case name: Application of the Convention of 1902 Governing the Guardianship of Infants (Netherlands v. Sweden)
- Decided: November 28, 1958

Netherlands v Sweden ,1958 ICJ 8, (also known as the Boll case) was heard before the International Court of Justice in 1958. It remains the only case in which a Convention drafted by the Hague Conference on Private International Law was the principal subject of interpretation by a court with worldwide jurisdiction.

== Facts ==
The Netherlands sued Sweden in regards to the guardianship of a child, Marie Elizabeth Boll. Marie was the daughter of a Dutch seafarer whose Swedish wife had died. Before the mother's death, the child lived in Sweden with her mother but, under the existing rules of nationality during that period, was entitled to only the Dutch nationality of her father. In spite of Marie's residence in Sweden, Dutch authorities assigned her guardianship, according to their own procedures.

Swedish authorities overrode the Dutch decisions and placed the child under a protective public care order, based on the fact that Marie was residing in Sweden with maternal grandparents.

== Judgment ==
The Court analyzed the Hague Convention of 1902 relating to the settlement of guardianship of minors and found that the concept of guardianship should be narrowly interpreted. As such, the 1902 Convention did not prevent institutions of public law, here the Swedish order, from intervening to take the child into "care" or "protective upbringing." The practical effect of the decision was that it allowed a state to void the guardianship orders of another state with presumptive jurisdiction, by enacting public laws.

== Significance ==
In response to the decision, the Hague Conference, which had recently created a small Permanent Bureau, responded by drafting a new Convention in the Conference's Ninth Diplomatic Session in 1960, the Hague Convention of 1961 concerning the powers of authorities and the law applicable in respect of the protection of minors, which included expanded language regarding "measures directed to the protection of [the child's] person or property," which was specifically intended to apply to both a state's own private law orders, such as guardianship orders, but also to all public care orders.

== See also ==
- List of International Court of Justice cases
