= Hague Protection of Adults Convention =

Convention of 13 January 2000 on the International Protection of Adults
- Party Signatory that did not ratify
- Signed: 13 January 2000
- Location: The Hague, The Netherlands
- Effective: 1 January 2009
- Condition: Ratification by 3 states
- Signatories: 20
- Parties: 17
- Depositary: Ministry of Foreign Affairs (Netherlands)
- Languages: English and French

The Hague Protection of Adults Convention, formally the Convention on the International Protection of Adults, is a convention concluded by the Hague Conference on Private International Law in 2000. The convention entered into force in 2009 and currently applies in seventeen states. The convention is aimed at the protection of vulnerable adults, persons who are "by reason of an impairment or insufficiency of their personal faculties, are not in a position to protect their interests". The convention

- determines which courts have jurisdiction to take protection measures
- determines which law is to be applied in the circumstances; and who may be a vulnerable person
- establishes a system of central authorities which should cooperate, locate vulnerable adults and give information on the status of vulnerable persons to other authorities.

== Parties ==
As of October 2026, the convention applies in seventeen states.

State	Signature	Ratification/accession	Entry into force	Territorial application
Austria	10 July 2013	9 October 2013	1 February 2014	
Belgium	6 February 2017	30 September 2020	1 January 2021	
Cyprus	1 April 2009	18 September 2018	1 November 2018	
Czech Republic	1 April 2009	18 April 2012	1 August 2012	
Estonia		13 December 2010	1 March 2011	
Finland	18 September 2008	19 November 2010	1 March 2011	
France	13 July 2001	18 September 2008	1 January 2009	
Germany	22 December 2003	3 April 2007	1 January 2009	
Greece	18 September 2008	28 July 2022	1 November 2022	
Ireland	18 September 2008	31 May 2024	1 September 2024	
Italy	31 October 2008			
Latvia	15 December 2016	24 November 2017	1 March 2018	
Luxembourg	18 September 2008			
Malta	11 November 2022	8 March 2023	1 July 2023	
Monaco	4 March 2016	4 March 2016	1 December 2016	
Montenegro		13 October 2026	1 August 2027	
Netherlands	13 January 2000			
Poland	18 September 2008			
Portugal	18 September 2008	14 March 2018	1 July 2018	
Romania	28 August 2024			
Scotland	1 April 2003	5 November 2003	1 January 2009	UK ratified on behalf of Scotland
Switzerland	3 April 2007	27 March 2009	1 July 2009	
