= Cornelis Felix van Maanen =

Dutch minister and jurist

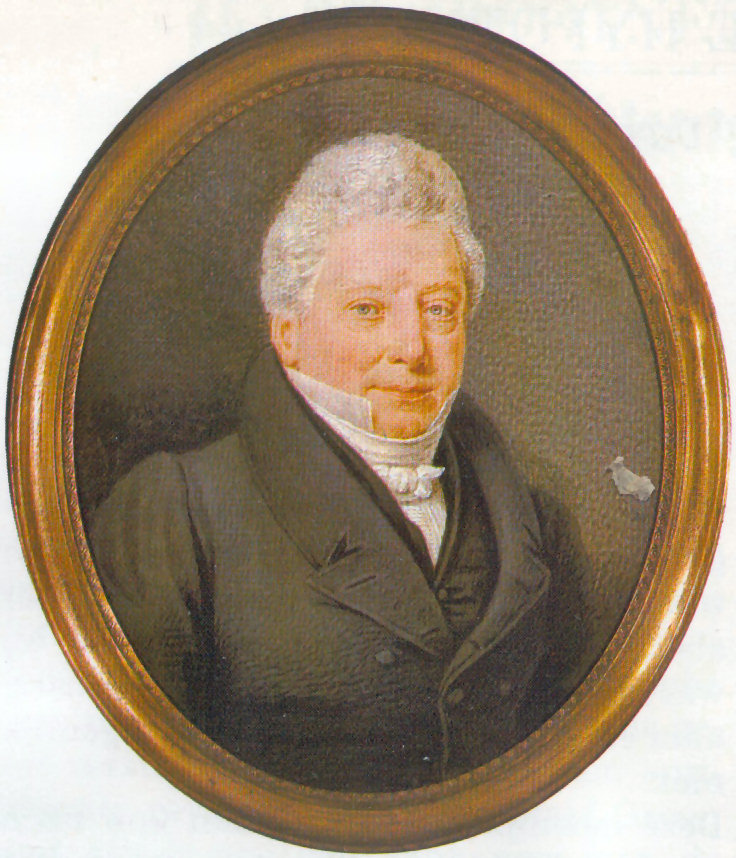
- Cornelis Felix van Maanen ca. 1830

Minister of Justice
- In office 1806–1842
- Monarchs: Louis Bonaparte, Napoleon, William I

Personal details
- Born: September 9, 1769 The Hague, Dutch Republic
- Died: February 14, 1846 (aged 76) The Hague, Netherlands
- Education: Leiden University
- Profession: Jurist
- Known for: Treaty of The Hague (1818); role in Belgian Revolution; promotion of Dutch language

Cornelis Felix van Maanen (September 9, 1769 – February 14, 1846) was a Dutch minister and jurist.

Van Maanen was born in The Hague. He studied law in Leiden, and entered legal practice in The Hague, where he later became a general prosecutor. He rose to prominence under the French-dominated Kingdom of Holland, being appointed Minister of Justice in 1806 by Louis Bonaparte, and to the Council of State and as head of the Court of Appeals in The Hague in 1810 by Napoleon. He adapted to the changing political circumstances well, however, and was again appointed Minister of Justice in 1815 by King William of the new United Kingdom of the Netherlands. Along with de Nagell, he was a signatory of the Treaty of The Hague (1818), by which the British and Dutch established the Anglo-Dutch Mixed Commission Courts. He was active in promoting the Dutch language in Belgium and advising the King against giving concessions in the turmoil that led to the Belgian Revolution. He left office in 1842, following the abdication of King William.
