= Taken from Me: The Tiffany Rubin Story =

- Genre: Drama
- Written by: Michael Bortman
- Directed by: Gary Harvey
- Starring: Taraji P. Henson; Terry O'Quinn; Drew Davis; David Haydn-Jones; Sean Baek
- Music by: James Gelfand
- Countries of origin: United States; Canada
- Original language: English

Production
- Executive producers: Anne Carlucci; David A. Rosemont
- Producer: Harvey Kahn
- Cinematography: Mathias Herndl
- Editor: Richard Schwadel
- Production company: Front Street Pictures

Original release
- Network: LMN
- Release: January 31, 2011

Taken from Me: The Tiffany Rubin Story is a 2011 original LMN film, starring Taraji P. Henson and Terry O'Quinn. The film follows the events surrounding the kidnapping, captivity and rescue of the son of Tiffany Rubin, who was kidnapped by his father and taken to South Korea. The film shed light to the long-standing issue of International child abduction in South Korea and the danger that the abducted children face in the country.

== Plot ==
The film is based on the dramatic true story of Tiffany Rubin's daring 2008 rescue of her six-year-old son, Kobe, after he was abducted by his biological father Jeff and taken from his home in Queens, New York, all the way to Seoul, South Korea. At the urging of her mother Belzora, Tiffany seeks the counsel of Mark Miller (Terry O'Quinn) and his charitable organization, the American Association for Lost Children. With Mark's help, Tiffany is able to travel to Korea to execute a high-stakes plan to bring her son home.

== Cast ==
- Taraji P. Henson as Tiffany
- Terry O'Quinn as Mark
- David Haydn-Jones as Chris
- Crystal Lowe as Natalie
- Sean Baek as Jeff
- Beverly Todd as Belzora

== Awards ==
Taken from Me: The Tiffany Rubin Story received several award nominations and accolades, mostly for Taraji P. Henson's performance. Henson received five nominations to various awards, and won three of them.

Award	Category	Recipient	Result
Primetime Emmy Awards	Outstanding Lead Actress in a Miniseries or Movie	Taraji P. Henson	Nominated
Satellite Awards	Best Actress – Miniseries or Television Film	Taraji P. Henson	Nominated
Image Awards	Outstanding Actress in a Television Movie, Miniseries, or Dramatic Special	Taraji P. Henson	Won
BET Awards	Best Actress	Taraji P. Henson	Won
Black Reel Awards	Outstanding Television or Miniseries Performance: Female	Taraji P. Henson	Won
Black Reel Awards	Outstanding Television or Miniseries Film	Harvey Kahn	Nominated
Directors Guild of Canada	Direction - Television Movie/Miniseries	Gary Harvey	Nominated
Directors Guild of Canada	Picture Editing - Television Movie/Miniseries	Richard Scwadel	Nominated

== See also ==
- Parental child abduction
- International child abduction in South Korea
