= Vulnerable adult =

Adult who is not able to care for themself

A vulnerable adult refers to any person who, due to mental, cognitive or bodily disability, is unable to care for themselves. It is a socio-economic construct which primarily seeks to describe people who are unable to make a living and/or require some level of help in managing personal life. The term is also used in the UK to describe adults who are, for various reasons, at risk of being mistreated by the police.

== Causes ==
Vulnerability can be due to inborn genetic defects, e.g. Down syndrome. Aging can cause or worsen a person's vulnerability, by physical decrepitude, dementia, various age-related diseases and/or lack of money due to retirement. Physically disabled people, notably where it interfers with finding work, are also vulnerable. Adults may also be vulnerable due to neurodevelopmental disorders and/or mental disorders. The presence of a diagnosis is usually not in itself sufficient for people to be counted as vulnerable.

Adults can as well become vulnerable because of man-made disasters such as economic wars, systemic oppression and political upheavals leaving the adults unable to meet their daily needs effectively.

Many vulnerable adults have suffered abuse, neglect and stigmatization, the long-term effects of which may aggravate their vulnerability.

== Effects ==
A vulnerable adult's daily living activities may be affected by impairments such as illiteracy, communication difficulties, learning disabilities and other practical deficits. International initiatives (such as the UN's Sustainable Development Goal 4) try to fix this by giving them a fair chance to learn.

If a vulnerable person suffers from cognitive impairment, this may put them at greater-than-usual risk of abuse (domestic or institutional) and exploitation. Vulnerable adults may also be at risk of self-neglect if they do not receive sufficient support.

Some vulnerable adults live in assisted living facilities, notably those with cognitive and severe physical impairments, or council estates, depending on the degree of their vulnerability and the accessibility of such facilities. Adults who are vulnerable as a result of trauma may be offered trauma counselling.

== Legal protection ==
A vulnerable person's legal status depends on the extent of their impairment rather than on any diagnosis itself. Some vulnerable people may not qualify for long-term care despite being generally unable to live independently.

Vulnerable adults sometimes have guardians - these are individuals with a legal right to make decisions on their behalf, such as those related to medical care and housing. Guardians may be family or friends, or they may be professionals who make decisions on behalf of many vulnerable people in exchange for their money.

=== By country ===
==== England and Wales ====
NB The definition of a vulnerable adult in Section 59 of the 2006 Act is modified by the Safeguarding Vulnerable Groups Act 2006 (Miscellaneous Provisions) Order 2009, which excludes disabilities which don't make an adult vulnerable.

In the law of England and Wales, 'vulnerable adult' is loosely defined. Section 59 of the Safeguarding Vulnerable Groups Act 2006 says:

1) A person is a vulnerable adult if he has attained the age of 18 and—

(a) he is in residential accommodation,

(b) he is in sheltered housing,

(c) he receives domiciliary care,

(d) he receives any form of health care,

(e) he is detained in lawful custody,

(f) he is by virtue of an order of a court under supervision by a person exercising functions for the purposes of Part 1 of the Criminal Justice and Court Services Act 2000 (c. 43),

(g) he receives a welfare service of a prescribed description,

(h) he receives any service or participates in any activity provided specifically for persons who fall within subsection (9),

(i) payments are made to him (or to another on his behalf) in pursuance of arrangements under section 57 of the Health and Social Care Act 2001 (c. 15), or

(j) he requires assistance in the conduct of his own affairs.

In most parts of the world, the last section, (j), is what defines a vulnerable adult.

People are starting to say 'adult at risk' or 'adult at risk of harm' instead of 'vulnerable adult'.

==== Singapore ====
In Singapore, the Vulnerable Adults Act ("the Act") was signed on 19 December 2018. The Act defines that a vulnerable adult includes anyone over 18 years old whose mental or physical disabilities leave them helpless against abuse, neglect, and self-neglect, which terms are defined in s.2.

==== United States ====
The United States uses the term "incapacitated adult" interchangeably with the term "vulnerable adult". The Department of Justice defines this as "an adult who is unable to receive and evaluate information or make or communicate informed decisions to such an extent that the adult lacks the ability to meet essential requirements for physical health, safety or self-care, even with reasonably available appropriate technological assistance" (Civil Financial Exploitation 22 M.R.S. § 3472 (2020)).

In 2012, Governor Mark Dayton of Minnesota signed a bipartisan bill for vulnerable adults which made abuse and neglect into felony offenses. The bill also increased the penalties for those who use restraints to harm children.

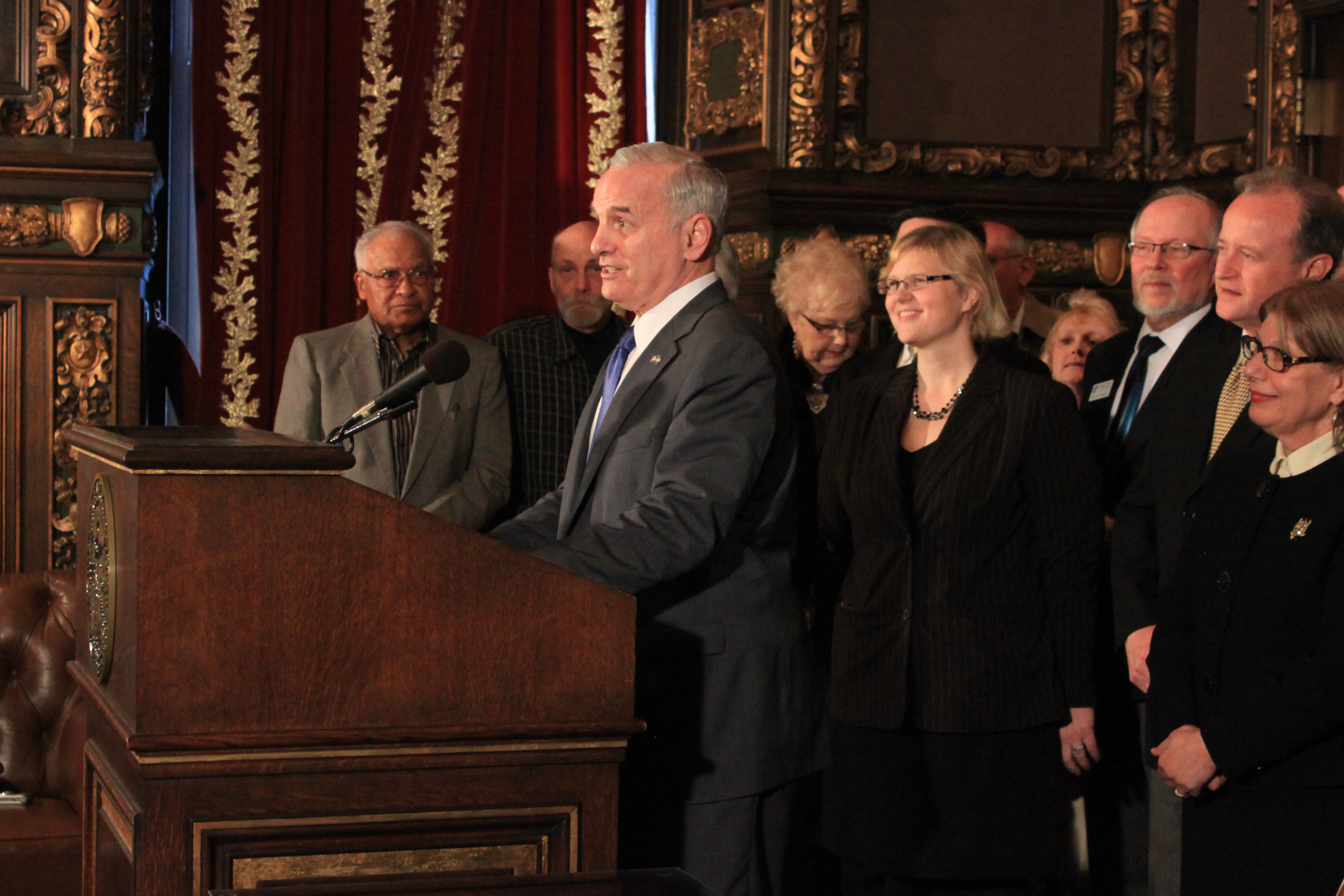
Governor of Minnesota signs bill to protect vulnerable adults with key proponents and legislators.

Lawmakers worked with health care workers and the nurses union to craft the law. The Minnesota Nurses Association said:

The compromise was an effort between all parties to protect the rights of workers in cases of understaffing, while giving the county attorney the right to charge someone who intends to neglect a vulnerable adult with a felony as opposed to a gross misdemeanor.

Before this law, the most severe charges were gross misdemeanors with no prison time. This law means that bodily injury carries a penalty of up to 10 years in prison or up to $10,000 fine or both. On the other hand, partial or considerable bodily harm could bring up to five years in prison and/or up to $5,000 in fines.

==== Latin America and the Caribbean ====
An estimated, 12% of Latin America and the Caribbean has a disability. This amounts to 66 million people. The ECLAC has allocated resources to examine what can be done for housing for disabled people as well programs for education and employment.

== See also ==
- Institutional abuse
- Mate crime
- Hague Protection of Adults Convention
