= International child abduction in South Korea =

International child abduction in South Korea refers to the illegal removal of children from their country of habitual residence by an acquaintance or family member to South Korea, or their illegal retention in South Korea (officially referred to as the Republic of Korea, or ROK). This issue overlaps with related practices within the South Korean family law system (and culture), such as the lack of meaningful protection against domestic abductions and visitation interference, combined with the default expectation of sole custody (according to NGO FindMyParent). Many of these practices also undermine South Korea's ratification of the United Nations Convention on the Rights of the Child.

Despite enacting legislation to address the problem in response to pressure from other countries, in particular the US, South Korea continues to face criticism for its handling of international child abduction cases.

== The Hague Child Abduction Convention ==
South Korea became a party to the Hague Child Abduction Convention in December 2012. Its domestic implementation law entered into force on March 1, 2013. The implementation act designates the Ministry of Justice as the Central Authority for both incoming and outgoing cases, and assigns exclusive jurisdiction over Hague child return cases to Seoul Family Court. The first decision to return a child to a foreign country (Japan) was reached in 2016.

=== Compliance failures ===
Each year, the US State Department Office of Children's Issues publishes compliance reports assessing how well other countries are handling the abduction issue. In its 2022 Annual Report on International Child Abduction, the US Department State first cited South Korea as demonstrating a pattern of non-compliance with its Hague Convention treaty obligations. Korea was cited as non-compliant country for additional years 2023, 2024, and 2025 (4 consecutive years).

Problems were noted with judicial delays:

...cases were generally pending with the Korean judicial authorities for over one year. Additionally, while courts in the Republic of Korea ordered the return of children in Convention cases, the need for multiple enforcement proceedings resulted in delays.

Of additional note was the lack of enforcement of finalized return decisions:

Specifically, Korean law enforcement authorities regularly failed to enforce return orders in abduction cases. As a result of this failure, 50 percent of requests for the return of abducted children under the Convention remained unresolved for more than 12 months. On average, these cases were unresolved for two years and ten months.…While courts in the Republic of Korea ordered the return of children under the Convention, decisions for return were generally not enforced, including one case that was pending for more than three years as of December 31, 2022. There were two cases (accounting for 100 percent of the unresolved cases) that have been pending for more than 12 months in which law enforcement has failed to enforce a return order. Additionally, left-behind parents can spend months in legal proceedings seeking to enforce the return order, resulting in delays to return. Unless the taking parent voluntarily complied with a return order under the Convention, judicial decisions in Convention cases in the Republic of Korea were generally not enforced, which contributed to a pattern of noncompliance.

=== Protests and US diplomatic action ===
In response to the Hague compliance failures, affected parents from the United States launched protests both within South Korea and in the US.

In December 2022, the US State Department sent its Special Adviser for Children's Issues to Seoul to raise the issue directly with Korean government counterparts. The Special Advisor also published an opinion piece in one of the main newspapers in Korea, the JoongAng Ilbo:

When I meet with left-behind parents who have had their children abducted to the ROK, I hear their stories of pain and hope. These parents spend years in multiple legal proceedings, compounding their misery and draining their resources. Courts and other authorities in both the ROK and United States agree: it is time to secure the prompt return of these children to their habitual residence.

Additional high-level talks took place on an ongoing basis, as detailed in the 2022, 2023, Action Reports on International Child Abduction from the US State Department, which led to the creation of a task force team within the Korean government to address the issue. However, the continued failure to comply with the Hague convention resulted in even escalated actions from the US government in year 2024.

=== Enactment of reforms and continued criticism ===
After some diplomatic pressure from the United States government, the Supreme Court of Korea announced the new enforcement regulations that went into effect on April 1, 2024. However, limitations in the scope of the reforms left doubts about whether they will be sufficient to resolve the non-compliance issue.
Ultimately these new regulations were found insufficient, leading to the Korean officials' inability or unwillingness to manage the abducting parent's resistance or mitigate the emotional impact on the children. As a result of some abduction cases remaining unresolved, Korea continued to be cited again for its non-compliance. According to the 2024 Action Report published by the Department of State of the United States, the US government has engaged with the Korean government on multiple levels to raise concerns over the lack of enforcement of Convention return orders. This includes the communication with the ROK president Yoon Suk Yeol, through his secretary, or Antony Blinken, the Secretary of State's direct communication with the Korean Minister of Foreign Affairs.

The United States Congress held a hearing on September 10, 2024 on the current violators of Hague convention, in which South Korea was mentioned as one of the 16 non-compliant countries, including Argentina, Peru, Belize, Honduras, Montenegro and Ecuador. The congress called for a whole-of-government approach towards the countries that do not respect the treaty, while Korea's failure to enforce the Hague return orders was highlighted by the witnesses from the Bureau of East Asian and Pacific Affairs and Office of Children's Issues. Representatives from both Democratic Party and Republican Party mentioned Korea regarding the failure to comply with the Hague convention. Through these series of events Korea earned its disgraceful title, "The haven for child abductors".

== Notable pre-Hague cases ==
Before the Hague Abduction Convention went into effect in South Korea, the only options for left-behind parents were to either pursue criminal charges, or to try to recover their children via self-help attempts, assuming they were unable to establish custody rights through the Korean courts. This led to a number of very high-profile cases covered in news media worldwide:

- New York, USA: The Tiffany Rubin Story was a successful self-help attempt by a mother from New York, whose son was abducted by his Korean father
- California, USA: an immigrant South Korean mother fled from alleged abuse by the California father, and was later arrested on entry to Hawaii, leading to protest campaigns on her behalf
- New Jersey, USA: in a somewhat similar case, a violinist Korean mother alleged abuse against one of her children by their New Jersey father, also a violinist, while they lived together in Korea. After disappearing with the children, she was later arrested on entry to Guam. Once the father recovered the children, he was granted sole custody, with the mother able to have limited parenting time with them after her release.
- Vietnam: a Vietnamese mother abducted her child from South Korea to Vietnam, and later on re-entry to Korea, stood trial for abduction. She was found non-guilty all the way up to the Korean Supreme Court, which ruled that the abduction was not a crime since the child's welfare had not been harmed.
- France: a Korean father abducted his daughter from Paris to South Korea. After five and a half years of court proceedings, the mother was finally able to recover their daughter. In doing so, she established a criminal precedent within the South Korean legal system, with the father's conviction on charges of parental kidnapping being upheld by the Korean Supreme Court. The distinction from the previous Vietnam precedent was that the abduction was found to have harmed the daughter's welfare in a number of different ways, including the complete loss of the French language.

=== The 2008 Rescue of Kobe Lee in South Korea ===
The case of Tiffany Rubin involved the abduction of her six-year-old son, Kobe Lee, from New York, U.S.A., on August 21, 2007, by her former partner, Jeffrey Salko (also known as Kang Shik Lee, a Korean-American). Kobe Lee was subsequently taken to South Korea.

In 2008, Kobe Lee was reunited with his mother following the involvement of Craig Eibeck, an Australian national stationed in South Korea.

According to reports, Craig Eibeck contacted Tiffany Rubin through her Myspace page with information regarding her son's location. It reportedly took over a year for Eibeck to gain Rubin's trust and convince her that he could facilitate Kobe Lee's return if she traveled to South Korea.

Tiffany Rubin reportedly cited financial constraints and concerns about traveling to South Korea, including the possibility that Eibeck might be Jeffrey Salko or an associate.

Eibeck continued to communicate with Rubin, providing updates about Kobe Lee, including the school he attended and Jeffrey Salko's activities. This information was reportedly also shared with the FBI (New York Office), the U.S. National Center for Missing and Exploited Children, and the U.S. Embassy in Seoul.

According to Craig Eibeck, while the U.S. Embassy in Seoul housed an FBI legal attaché office, he stated that this office did not take action regarding the case.

In 2008, Rubin reportedly sought assistance from the American Association for Lost Children, Mark Miller, and an associate known as Baz, who provided financial support for her travel to South Korea and accompanied her.

On March 25, 2008, Eibeck reportedly took Miller and Baz to the Seoul-GorMyeong Public Elementary School, where Kobe Lee was attending. He is said to have informed them about how to rescue Kobe from the school and the route to the U.S. Embassy in Seoul.

On March 26, 2008, Kobe Lee was reportedly retrieved, and Rubin, Miller, and Baz proceeded to the U.S. Embassy in Seoul with him. The embassy reportedly issued a new passport for Kobe Lee and facilitated their travel to Incheon International Airport, from where they boarded a flight to New York.

Following these events, Craig Eibeck organised for Jeffrey Salko to travel to Guam for a vacation, where he was reportedly arrested by the FBI in Guam in 2008, taken to New York, U.S.A. and imprisoned.

== See also ==
- Law of South Korea
- International child abduction in the United States
