= Convention on the Law Applicable to Products Liability =

Treaty on applicable law in product liability cases

Hague Liability Convention
Convention on the Law Applicable to Products Liability
- State parties to the convention Parties to the convention Signatories to the convention Territories where the convention was applicable
- Signed: 2 October 1973
- Location: The Hague, Netherlands
- Effective: 1 October 1977
- Condition: 3 ratifications
- Parties: 11
- Depositary: Ministry of Foreign Affairs of the Kingdom of the Netherlands
- Languages: French and English

Full text
- Convention on the Law Applicable to Products Liability at Wikisource

The Convention on the Law Applicable to Products Liability is a convention concluded in 1971 within the framework of the Hague Conference on Private International Law (HCCH), which governs the law that should be applied to products liability cases. It entered into force in 1973 and as of 2020, 11 countries are party to it.

== Scope of application ==
The convention exclusively determines the law that applies between the manufacturer or distributor of a product and the person(s) that have suffered damage. It thus does not handle which court has jurisdiction, or whether a judicial decision should be recognized.

The convention does not apply between the seller that directly sold the product to the person suffering the damage. The exclusion was chosen as the negotiators deemed the relationship between those two parties already clear enough, and would hamper wide adoption of the convention.

The products the convention applies to "shall include natural and industrial products, whether raw or manufactured and whether movable or immovable", and thus has a wide meaning. Member states can decide to exclude agricultural products from the scope of the convention (Article 16), as Spain did.

== Applicable law ==
The convention's main articles determining which law should be applied are Articles 4 and (if that doesn't result in an applicable law) Article 5. They are summarized below:

Applicable law	If it is also...	Article	Condition
Location where damage occurred	Residence of the person suffering damage	Article 4a	
Location where damage occurred	principle place of business of the person held liable	Article 4b	
Location where damage occurred	place where the product was bought	Article 4c	
Residence of the person suffering damage	the product was bought there	Article 5a	Article 4 does not lead to an applicable law
Residence of the person suffering damage	the principle place of business of the person held liable	Article 5b	Article 4 does not lead to an applicable law
the principle place of business of the person held liable	not a claim based on the law of the state where the injury took place	Article 6	Article 4 and 5 do not lead to an applicable law

== Parties ==
State	Signature	Ratification/Accession	Entry into force	Comments
Belgium	24 March 1976			
Croatia		22 January 1994	8 October 1991	succession of Yugoslavia
Finland	10 August 1992	10 August 1992	1 November 1992	
France	18 December 1973	19 July 1977	1 October 1977	
Italy	6 February 1975			
Luxembourg	2 October 1973	31 May 1985	1 August 1985	
Montenegro		1 March 2007	3 June 2006	succession of Yugoslavia
Kingdom of the Netherlands	2 October 1973	27 June 1979	1 November 1979	for the whole Kingdom
Norway	2 October 1973	13 August 1976	1 October 1977	does not apply to "rules of prescription and limitation"
Portugal	10 October 1973			
North Macedonia		20 September 1993	17 November 1991	succession of Yugoslavia
Serbia		29 April 2001	27 April 1992	succession of Yugoslavia
Slovenia		8 June 1992	25 June 1991	succession for Yugoslavia
Spain	11 March 1987	23 November 1988	1 February 1989	reserves the right not to apply it to agricultural products
Yugoslavia	15 December 1976	15 December 1976	1 October 1977	Still applicable through succession except in Bosnia and Herzegovina and Kosovo
