= Convention on the Recognition and Enforcement of Foreign Arbitral Awards =

International treaty within the UN framework

New York Convention
Convention on the Recognition and Enforcement of Foreign Arbitral Awards
- Parties to the convention
- Signed: 10 June 1958
- Location: New York City, United States
- Effective: 7 June 1959
- Condition: 3 ratifications
- Signatories: 24
- Parties: 172
- Depositaries: Secretary-General of the United Nations
- Languages: Arabic, Chinese, English, French, Russian and Spanish

Full text
- Convention on the Recognition and Enforcement of Foreign Arbitral Awards at Wikisource

The Convention on the Recognition and Enforcement of Foreign Arbitral Awards, commonly known as the New York Convention, was adopted by a United Nations diplomatic conference on 10 June 1958 and entered into force on 7 June 1959. The Convention requires courts of contracting states to give effect to private agreements to arbitrate and to recognize and enforce arbitration awards made in other contracting states. Widely considered the foundational instrument for international arbitration, it applies to arbitrations that are not considered as domestic awards in the state where recognition and enforcement is sought.

The New York Convention is very successful. Nowadays many countries have adopted arbitration laws based on the UNCITRAL Model Law on International Commercial Arbitration. This works with the New York Convention so that the provisions on making an enforceable award, or asking a court to set it aside or not enforce it, are the same under the Model Law and the New York Convention. The Model Law does not replace the convention; it works with it. An award made in a country which is not a signatory to the Convention cannot take advantage of the convention to enforce that award in the 169 contracting states unless there is bilateral recognition, whether or not the arbitration was held under the provisions of the UNCITRAL Model Law.

== Background ==
In 1953, the International Chamber of Commerce (ICC) produced the first draft Convention on the Recognition and Enforcement of International Arbitral Awards to the United Nations Economic and Social Council. With slight modifications, the council submitted the convention to the International Conference in the Spring of 1958. The Conference was chaired by Willem Schurmann, the Dutch Permanent Representative to the United Nations and Oscar Schachter, a leading figure in international law who later taught at Columbia Law School and the Columbia School of International and Public Affairs, and served as the President of the American Society of International Law.

International arbitration is an increasingly popular means of alternative dispute resolution for cross-border commercial transactions. The primary advantage of arbitration over court litigation is enforceability: an arbitration award is enforceable in most countries in the world. Other advantages of arbitration include the ability to select a neutral forum to resolve disputes, that arbitration awards are final and not ordinarily subject to appeal, the ability to choose flexible procedures for the arbitration, and confidentiality.

Once a dispute between parties is settled, the winning party needs to collect the award or judgment. If the loser voluntarily pays, no court action is necessary. Otherwise, unless the assets of the losing party are located in the country where the court judgment was rendered, the winning party needs to obtain a court judgment in the jurisdiction where the other party resides or where its assets are located. Unless there is a treaty on recognition of court judgments between the country where the judgment is rendered and the country where the winning party seeks to collect, the winning party will be unable to use the court judgment to collect.

=== Cases and statistics ===
Public information on overall and specific arbitration cases is quite limited as there is no need to involve the courts at all unless there is a dispute, and in most cases the loser pays voluntarily. A review of disputed cases in China found that from 2000 to 2011, the Supreme People's Court upheld the refusal to enforce the arbitration agreement in 17 cases due to a provision in Article V of the convention (China has an automatic appeal system to the highest court, so this includes all such refusals).

== Summary of provisions ==
Under the convention, an arbitration award issued in any other state can generally be freely enforced in any other contracting state, only subject to certain, limited defenses. These defenses are:

1. a party to the arbitration agreement was, under the law applicable to him, under some incapacity, or the arbitration agreement was not valid under its governing law;
2. a party was not given proper notice of the appointment of the arbitrator or of the arbitration proceedings, or was otherwise unable to present its case;
3. the award deals with an issue not contemplated by or not falling within the terms of the submission to arbitration, or contains matters beyond the scope of the arbitration (subject to the proviso that an award which contains decisions on such matters may be enforced to the extent that it contains decisions on matters submitted to arbitration which can be separated from those matters not so submitted);
4. the composition of the arbitral tribunal was not in accordance with the agreement of the parties or, failing such agreement, with the law of the place where the hearing took place (the "lex loci arbitri");
5. the award has not yet become binding upon the parties, or has been set aside or suspended by a competent authority, either in the country where the arbitration took place, or pursuant to the law of the arbitration agreement;
6. the subject matter of the award was not capable of resolution by arbitration; or
7. enforcement would be contrary to "public policy".

Additionally, there are three types of reservations that countries may apply:

1. Conventional Reservation – some countries only enforce arbitration awards issued in a Convention member state
2. Commercial Reservation – some countries only enforce arbitration awards that are related to commercial transactions
3. Reciprocity reservation – some countries may choose not to limit the convention to only awards from other contracting states, but may however limit application to awards from non-contracting states such that they will only apply it to the extent to which such a non-contracting state grants reciprocal treatment.

States may make any or all of the above reservations. Because there are two similar issues conflated under the term "reciprocity", it is important to determine which such reservation (or both) an enforcing state has made.

== Parties to the Convention ==
As of January 2023, the convention has 172 state parties, which includes 169 of the 193 United Nations member states plus the Cook Islands, the Holy See, and the State of Palestine. Twenty-four UN member states have not yet adopted the convention. In addition, Taiwan has not been permitted to adopt the convention (but generally enforces foreign arbitration judgments) and a number of British Overseas Territories have not had the Convention extended to them by Order in Council. British Overseas Territories to which the New York Convention has not yet been extended by Order in Council are: Anguilla, Falkland Islands, Turks and Caicos Islands, Montserrat, Saint Helena (including Ascension and Tristan da Cunha).

State	Date of Adoption	State	Date of Adoption
Afghanistan	30 November 2005	Albania	27 June 2001
Algeria	7 February 1989	Andorra	19 June 2015
Angola	6 March 2017		
Antigua and Barbuda	2 February 1989	Argentina	14 March 1989
Armenia	29 December 1997	Australia	26 March 1975
Austria	2 May 1961	Azerbaijan	29 February 2000
Bahamas	20 December 2006	Bahrain	6 April 1988
Bangladesh	6 May 1992	Barbados	16 March 1993
Belarus	15 November 1960	Belgium	18 August 1975
Belize	15 March 2021		
Benin	16 May 1974	Bhutan	25 September 2014
Bolivia	28 April 1995	Bosnia and Herzegovina	1 September 1993
Botswana	20 December 1971	Brazil	7 June 2002
Brunei	25 July 1996	Bulgaria	10 October 1961
Burkina Faso	23 March 1987	Burundi	23 June 2014
Cambodia	5 January 1960	Cameroon	19 February 1988
Canada	12 May 1986	Cape Verde	22 March 2018
Central African Republic	15 October 1962		
Chile	4 September 1975	People's Republic of China	22 January 1987
Colombia	25 September 1979	Democratic Republic of the Congo	5 November 2014
Comoros	28 April 2015	Costa Rica	26 October 1987
Côte d'Ivoire	1 February 1991	Cook Islands	12 January 2009
Croatia	26 July 1993	Cuba	30 December 1974
Cyprus	29 December 1980	Czech Republic	30 September 1993
Denmark	22 December 1972	Djibouti	14 June 1983
Dominica	28 October 1988	Dominican Republic	11 April 2002
Ecuador	3 January 1962	Egypt	9 March 1959
El Salvador	10 June 1958	Estonia	30 August 1993
Ethiopia	24 August 2020	Fiji	26 December 2010
Finland	19 January 1962	France	26 June 1959
Gabon	15 December 2006	Georgia	2 June 1994
Germany	30 June 1961	Ghana	9 April 1968
Greece	16 July 1962	Guatemala	21 March 1984
Guinea	23 January 1991	Guyana	25 September 2014
Haiti	5 December 1983	Holy See	14 May 1975
Honduras	3 October 2000	Hungary	5 March 1962
Iceland	24 January 2002	India	13 July 1960
Indonesia	7 October 1981	Iran	15 October 2001
Iraq	11 November 2021	Ireland	12 May 1981
Israel	5 January 1959	Italy	31 January 1969
Jamaica	10 July 2002	Japan	20 June 1961
Jordan	15 November 1979	Kazakhstan	20 November 1995
Kenya	10 February 1989	South Korea	8 February 1973
Kuwait	28 April 1978	Kyrgyzstan	18 December 1996
Laos	17 June 1998	Latvia	14 April 1992
Lebanon	11 August 1998	Lesotho	13 June 1989
Liberia	16 September 2005	Lithuania	14 March 1995
Liechtenstein	5 October 2011	Luxembourg	9 September 1983
Republic of Macedonia	10 March 1994	Madagascar	16 July 1962
Malaysia	5 November 1985	Malawi	4 March 2021
Maldives	17 September 2019	Mali	8 September 1994
Malta	22 June 2000	Marshall Islands	21 December 2006
Mauritania	30 January 1997	Mauritius	19 June 1996
Mexico	14 April 1971	Moldova	18 September 1998
Monaco	2 June 1982	Mongolia	24 October 1994
Montenegro	23 October 2006	Morocco	12 February 1959
Mozambique	11 June 1998	Myanmar	16 April 2013
Nepal	4 March 1998	Netherlands	24 April 1964
New Zealand	6 January 1983	Nicaragua	24 September 2003
Niger	14 October 1964	Nigeria	17 March 1970
Norway	14 March 1961	Oman	25 February 1999
Pakistan	14 July 2005	Palau	31 March 2020
Palestine	2 January 2015	Panama	10 October 1984
Papua New Guinea	17 July 2019	Paraguay	8 October 1997
Peru	7 July 1988	Philippines	6 July 1967
Poland	3 October 1961	Portugal	18 October 1994
Qatar	30 December 2002	Romania	13 September 1961
Russia	24 August 1960	Rwanda	31 October 2008
Saint Vincent and the Grenadines	12 September 2000	San Marino	17 May 1979
Sao Tome and Principe	20 November 2012	Saudi Arabia	19 April 1994
Senegal	17 October 1994	Serbia	12 March 2001
Seychelles	3 February 2020	Sierra Leone	28 October 2020
Singapore	21 August 1986	Slovakia	28 May 1993
Slovenia	6 July 1992	South Africa	3 May 1976
Spain	12 May 1977	Sri Lanka	9 April 1962
Sudan	26 March 2018	Sweden	28 January 1972
Suriname	10 November 2022		
Switzerland	1 June 1965	Syria	9 March 1959
Tanzania	13 October 1964	Tajikistan	14 August 2012
Thailand	21 December 1959	Timor-Leste	17 January 2023
Tonga	12 June 2020	Trinidad and Tobago	14 February 1966
Tunisia	17 July 1967	Turkey	2 July 1992
Turkmenistan	4 May 2022	Uganda	12 February 1992
Ukraine	10 October 1960	United Arab Emirates	21 August 2006
United Kingdom	24 September 1975	United States	30 September 1970
Uruguay	30 March 1983	Uzbekistan	7 February 1996
Venezuela	8 February 1995	Vietnam	12 September 1995
Zambia	14 March 2002	Zimbabwe	26 September 1994

The convention has also been extended to a number of British Crown Dependencies, Overseas Territories, Overseas departments, Unincorporated Territories and other subsidiary territories of sovereign states.

Territory	Date of Ratification	Territory	Date of Ratification
American Samoa		Aruba	24 April 1964
Ashmore and Cartier Islands		Australian Antarctic Territory	
Baker Island		Bermuda	14 November 1979
Bonaire	24 April 1964		
British Virgin Islands	25 May 2014	Christmas Island	26 March 1975
Cayman Islands	26 November 1980	Cocos (Keeling) Islands	26 March 1975
Coral Sea Islands		Curaçao	24 April 1964
		Faroe Islands	10 February 1976
French Guiana		French Polynesia	26 June 1959
French Southern and Antarctic Lands		Gibraltar	24 September 1975
Greenland	10 February 1976	Guadeloupe	
Guam	30 September 1970	Guernsey	19 April 1985
Heard Island and McDonald Islands		Howland Island	
Isle of Man	22 February 1979	Jarvis Island	
Jersey	19 April 1985	Johnston Atoll	
Kingman Reef		Martinique	
Mayotte		Midway Atoll	
Navassa Island		New Caledonia	26 June 1959
Norfolk Island		Palmyra Atoll	
Puerto Rico		Réunion	
Saba	24 April 1964	Saint Pierre and Miquelon	
Sint Eustatius	24 April 1964	Sint Maarten	24 April 1964
United States Virgin Islands		Wake Island	
Wallis and Futuna			

== States which are not party to the Convention ==
As of 2025, states that are not party are:

- Chad
- Equatorial Guinea
- Eritrea
- Eswatini
- Gambia
- Grenada
- Guinea-Bissau
- Kiribati
- Libya
- Federated States of Micronesia
- Namibia
- Nauru
- Niue
- North Korea
- Republic of the Congo
- Saint Kitts and Nevis
- Saint Lucia
- Samoa
- Solomon Islands
- Somalia
- South Sudan
- Togo
- Tuvalu
- Vanuatu
- Yemen

== United States issues ==
Under American law, the recognition of foreign arbitral awards is governed by chapter 2 of the Federal Arbitration Act, which incorporates the New York Convention.

Therefore, the New York Convention on the Recognition and Enforcement of Foreign Arbitral Awards (the "Convention") preempts state law. In Foster v. Neilson, the Supreme Court held "Our constitution declares a treaty to be the law of the land. It is, consequently, to be regarded in courts of justice as equivalent to an act of the Legislature, whenever it operates of itself without the aid of any legislative provision." Thus, over a course of 181 years, the United States Supreme Court has repeatedly held that a self-executing treaty is an act of the Legislature (i.e., act of Congress).

With specific regard to the New York Convention, at least one court discussed, but ultimately avoided, the issue of whether the treaty is self-executing. The court nonetheless held that the convention was, at the least, an implemented non-self-executing treaty that still had legal force as a treaty (as distinguished from an Act of Congress). Based on that determination, the court held that the Convention preempted state law that sought to void arbitration clauses in international reinsurance treaties.

== See also ==
- Hague Choice of Court Convention
- Hague Judgments Convention
