= Hague Convention on Foreign Judgments in Civil and Commercial Matters =

1971 multilateral treaty

Convention of 1 February 1971 on the Recognition and Enforcement of Foreign Judgments in Civil and Commercial Matters
- Signed: 1 February 1971
- Location: The Netherlands
- Effective: 20 August 1979
- Condition: Ratification by 3 states
- Signatories: 3
- Parties: 5 (as of 2013); Albania, Cyprus, Kuwait, Portugal and the Netherlands
- Depositary: Ministry of Foreign Affairs (Netherlands)
- Languages: English and French

Full text
- Convention on the Recognition and Enforcement of Foreign Judgments in Civil and Commercial Matters at Wikisource

The Hague Convention on the Recognition and Enforcement of Foreign Judgments in Civil and Commercial Matters is a multilateral treaty governing the enforcement of judgments entered by one nation's legal authorities in other signatory nations. It is one of a number of conventions in the area of private international law of the Hague Conference on Private International Law in 1971.

== States parties ==
Albania, Cyprus, Kuwait, Portugal and the Netherlands (Territory in Europe, Aruba and Curaçao) are parties to the convention.
