= Hague Judgments Convention =

International treaty

Convention of 2 July 2019 on the Recognition and Enforcement of Foreign Judgments in Civil or Commercial Matters
- Party Party (treaty not entered into force) Signatories that did not ratify
- Signed: 2 July 2019
- Location: The Hague, The Netherlands
- Effective: 1 September 2023
- Condition: 2 ratifications/accessions
- Signatories: 11
- Parties: 7: Andorra; Albania; European Union (applies in all 27 Member States, except Denmark); Montenegro; Ukraine; United Kingdom; Uruguay
- Depositary: Ministry of Foreign Affairs of the Kingdom of the Netherlands
- Languages: English and French

The Hague Judgments Convention, formally the Convention of 2 July 2019 on the Recognition and Enforcement of Foreign Judgments in Civil or Commercial Matters, is an international treaty concluded within the Hague Conference on Private International Law. It was concluded in 2019, and entered into force on 1 September 2023 for the European Union (applicable in all 27 Member States, except Denmark) and Ukraine, and now applies between 7 parties, covering 32 states. The convention governs the recognition of judgements in civil and commercial matters.

== History ==
The Hague Conference started with the "Judgements project" in 1996: the development of a convention regarding jurisdiction and recognition of judgements. Jurisdiction within such a convention would be classified in three categories: bases of jurisdiction which were obligatory, optional or prohibited. As the negotiators were not able to come to a consensus on such a convention, the scope of the work was reduced to jurisdiction and recognition of decisions based on a choice of court agreement between the parties. During the negotiations, parallels were drawn between the New York Convention on arbitral awards: the aim was to create a system of recognition of decisions based on court cases where the court was chosen pursuant to a choice of court agreements, which would create the same level of predictability and enforceability as is the case in arbitral awards in New York Convention states. The efforts led in 2005 to a convention with a narrower scope: the Hague Choice of Court convention focusing on recognition on judgments where jurisdiction had been assumed based on a choice of court agreement between the parties. After conclusion of the convention new rounds of negotiations led to the conclusion of this convention.

== Parties ==
All states can become parties to the convention: either through signature followed by ratification or acceptance, or by accession. The convention enters into force on 1 September 2023, 1 year after the first 2 states had deposited their instruments of ratification/accession. If a party objects to the ratification or accession of another party, the convention will not enter into force between those parties. Also regional economic integration organizations (such as the European Union) can become a party if such an organisation governs recognition of judgments.

The convention was signed on the day of its conclusion by Uruguay, in 2020 by Ukraine, in 2021 by Israel, Costa Rica and Russia, in 2022 by the United States, in 2023 by Montenegro and North Macedonia., and in 2024 by the United Kingdom, Kosovo and Albania.

The EU acceded in August 2022 with regard to all its members except Denmark and Ukraine ratified on the same day, thus triggering entry into force on 1 September 2023. Uruguay ratified on 1 September 2023, and thus the convention entered into force for that country on 1 October 2024.

On 23 November 2023, the UK announced that it would sign the convention as soon as practicable. The UK signed the convention on 12 January 2024 with regard to England and Wales and ratified it on 27 June 2024. It declared on 26 March 2025 that it will also extend to Scotland and Northern Ireland, and in January 2026 it declared extension to Gibraltar. This triggered the convention's entry into force in respect of the UK on 1 July 2025.

== See also ==
- Convention on the Recognition and Enforcement of Foreign Arbitral Awards
- Hague Choice of Court Convention
- Brussels Regime
