= Treaty of The Hague (1818) =

Diplomatic treaty preventing the slave trade

The Treaty of The Hague (1818) was between Great Britain and the Netherlands, and it set out to establish measures by which their respective subjects would be prevented from carrying out the slave trade. The treaty was signed by the Earl of Clancarty, de Nagell and Cornelis Felix van Maanen.
