= Treaty of The Hague (1674) =

- Drafted: 30 June 1674
- Signed: 10 July 1674
- Parties: Habsburg Monarchy; Dutch Republic; Spain; Denmark-Norway; Brandenburg-Prussia (Note: Brandenburg joined later in July 1674)

The Treaty of The Hague (1674) signed in 1674, was a defense treaty between the Habsburg Monarchy, Denmark-Norway, the Dutch Republic and Spain.

The treaty was signed because of increasing tension from Louis XIV and the many wars he caused in the 17th century. The treaty was and alliance treaty meant to be a deterrent to the Kingdom of France and Sweden. The alliance would formally bring Denmark-Norway and Brandenburg-Prussia into the Franco-Dutch War and would foreshadow the Scanian War in 1675.

== Stipulations ==
- In case of war, Denmark-Norway was to be paid 170,000 (14,000 per month) Rixdollar and to hold an army of 16,000 paid for by Spain and the Netherlands.
- These troops were only to be used if agreed open by the four powers.
- All members of the alliance would agree to help the others in case of war.
