= Hague Choice of Court Convention =

2005 treaty on private international law

Hague choice of court convention
Convention of 30 June 2005 on Choice of Court Agreements
- Parties (purple) and signatories (green)
- Signed: 30 June 2005
- Location: The Hague, The Netherlands
- Effective: 1 October 2015
- Condition: 2 ratifications/accessions
- Signatories: 11
- Parties: 13 (covering 38 countries):
- Depositary: Ministry of Foreign Affairs of the Kingdom of the Netherlands
- Languages: English and French

The Hague choice of court convention, formally the Convention of 30 June 2005 on Choice of Court Agreements, is an international treaty concluded within the Hague Conference on Private International Law. It was concluded in 2005, and entered into force on 1 October 2015. Twelve states and the European Union are party to the convention, which therefore applies in 38 states. China, Costa Rica, Israel, Kosovo and the United States signed the convention, but did not ratify.

Parties under the convention recognize a choice of court agreement between parties in the field of civil law and thus courts not chosen in the agreement will stay all proceedings, unless the chosen court refuses to uphold the jurisdiction. For the convention choice of court agreements must be "exclusive", which means in the context of the convention that also a group of courts may be chosen, as long as they are in the same country. It is not required for a choice of court agreement to explicitly state that the agreement is exclusive; designating a specific (set of) courts will automatically render it exclusive.

Judgments by the chosen court must be recognized in all states where the convention is applicable.

== History ==
The Hague Conference started with the "Judgements project" in 1996: the development of a convention regarding jurisdiction and recognition of judgements. Jurisdiction within such a convention would be classified in three categories: bases of jurisdiction which were obligatory, optional or prohibited. As the negotiators were not able to come to a consensus on such a convention, the scope of the work was reduced to jurisdiction and recognition of decisions based on a choice of court agreement between the parties. During the negotiations parallels were drawn between the New York Convention on arbitral awards: the aim was to create a system of recognition of decisions based on court cases where the court was chosen pursuant to a choice of court agreements, which would create the same level of predictability and enforceability as is the case in arbitral awards in New York Convention states.

== Parties ==
State	Signature	Ratification/ Accession	Entry into force	Comments
Albania	13 February 2024	25 June 2024	1 October 2024	
Bahrain		13 March 2025	1 July 2025	
China	12 September 2017			
Costa Rica	5 March 2025			
Denmark		30 May 2018	1 September 2018	does not apply to certain insurance contracts and to the Faroe Islands and Greenland
European Union	1 April 2009	11 June 2015	1 October 2015	EU territory of all member states except Denmark, included the UK until 2021; does not apply to certain insurance contracts
Israel	3 March 2021			
Kosovo	19 September 2024			
Mexico		26 September 2007	1 October 2015	
Moldova		14 March 2024	1 July 2024	does not apply to certain insurance contracts
Monaco		27 November 2025	1 March 2026	
Montenegro	5 October 2017	18 April 2018	1 August 2018	
North Macedonia	9 December 2019	21 November 2024	1 March 2025	
Singapore	25 March 2015	2 June 2016	1 October 2016	
Switzerland		18 September 2024	1 January 2025	including non-exclusive agreements
Ukraine	21 March 2016	28 April 2023	1 August 2023	
United Kingdom (Note: The convention applied to the UK as part of the European Union until Brexit on 1 February 2020, and until 1 January 2021, the European Union membership still encompassed the United Kingdom for this convention. The accession of the UK as a party in its own right, deposited on 2 January 2019, was first suspended and finally retracted on 30 January 2020. In September 2020 it submitted an instrument of accession again.The UK views itself as having been a member since 1 October 2015. The EU Commission has said the Hague Convention only applies to the UK from 1 January 2021.)		28 September 2020	1 January 2021	From 1 October 2015 to 31 December 2020 the UK was included in EU membership of the convention. Includes Gibraltar
United States	19 January 2009			

== See also ==
- New York Convention on the Recognition and Enforcement of Foreign Arbitral Awards
- Hague Judgments Convention
