= Hague Agreement =

Hague Agreement may refer to:

- The Dutch-Indonesian Round Table Conference
  - Hague Agreement Between Netherlands-Indonesia
- The Hague Agreement Concerning the International Deposit of Industrial Designs
