= Hague Tribunal =

Hague Tribunal is a popular name for any of the various international courts located in The Hague, Netherlands:

- Permanent Court of Arbitration, a permanent arbitration court established in 1899
- Permanent Court of International Justice (1922–1944), superseded by the International Court of Justice
- International Court of Justice (since 1945)
- International Criminal Tribunal for the former Yugoslavia, an ad hoc criminal tribunal created by the United Nations Security Council
- International Criminal Court, a permanent criminal court created by the Rome Statute of the International Criminal Court
- International Court of Arbitration of the International Chamber of Commerce
