= Hague Guardianship Convention =

1902 international treaty

Hague Convention of 1902 relating to the settlement of guardianship of minors
- Drafted: 12 June 1902
- Location: The Hague, Netherlands
- Effective: 30 July 1904
- Parties: 7: Belgium; Italy; Luxembourg; Poland; Portugal; Romania; Spain
- Depositary: Government of the Netherlands
- Language: French

Commonly referred to as the "Guardianship Convention", the Convention of 1902 relating to the settlement of guardianship of minors, along with the other Conventions in 1902, was the Hague Conference's first effort at addressing international family law. It was the first form of family law which would stay relevant for decades afterwards; it was also the only family law treaty that was expressly preserved and revived in the Treaty of Versailles and other post World War I peace treaties. The Guardianship Convention was written only in French and, with the Boll case, is the only Convention of the Hague Conference to ever be the principal subject of interpretation before a court with worldwide jurisdiction.

== Parties ==
As of 2016, seven states are party to the convention: Belgium, Italy, Luxembourg, Poland, Portugal, Romania and Spain. Six others: France, Germany, Hungary, the Netherlands, Sweden and Switzerland have denounced the convention.

== Other Conventions of 1902 ==
- Convention of 12 June 1902 relating to the settlement of the conflict of the laws concerning marriage
- Convention of 12 June 1902 relating to the settlement of the conflict of laws and jurisdictions as regards divorce and separation
