= Hague Convention on Parental Responsibility and Protection of Children =

Hague Convention 1996 Hague Protection Convention
Convention of 19 October 1996 on Jurisdiction, Applicable Law, Recognition, Enforcement and Co-operation in respect of Parental Responsibility and Measures for the Protection of Children
- Status of the convention Signatories Parties Parties (not yet in force)
- Signed: 19 October 1996
- Location: The Hague, the Netherlands
- Effective: 1 January 2002
- Condition: Ratification by 3 states
- Signatories: 35
- Parties: 54 (ratifications/accessions)
- Depositary: Ministry of Foreign Affairs (Netherlands)
- Languages: English and French

The Hague Convention on parental responsibility and protection of children, or Hague Convention 1996, officially Convention of 19 October 1996 on Jurisdiction, Applicable Law, Recognition, Enforcement and Co-operation in respect of Parental Responsibility and Measures for the Protection of Children or Hague Convention 1996 is a convention of the Hague Conference on Private International Law ("Hague Conference" or HCCH). It covers civil measures of protection concerning children, ranging from orders concerning parental responsibility and contact to public measures of protection or care, and from matters of representation to the protection of children's property. It is therefore much broader in scope than two earlier conventions of the HCCH on the subject.

The convention has uniform rules determining which country's authorities are competent to take the measures of protection. The Convention determines which country's laws are to be applied, and it provides for the recognition and enforcement of measures taken in one Contracting State in all other Contracting States. The co-operation provisions of the Convention provide the basic framework for the exchange of information and for the necessary degree of collaboration between administrative authorities in the Contracting States.

The Convention entered into force 1 January 2002 and as of October 2022 has 54 contracting States. Argentina, Canada, North Macedonia and the United States have signed the convention, but have not ratified it.

== Scope and application ==
The 1996 Convention aims to avoid orders about children's property and welfare (excluding parental responsibility and contact) being made in any state other than the state in which the child is habitually resident. It also allows orders made in the child's state of habitual residence to be registered and made enforceable in other Convention countries. It establishes a framework for the co-ordination of legal systems, and for international judicial and administrative co-operation.

== General background ==
=== The Hague Children's Conventions ===
The Hague Conference has, for more than a century, been involved in measures of protection under civil law of children at risk in cross-frontier situations. Three Hague Children's Conventions have been developed over the last twenty-five years, a fundamental purpose being to provide the practical machinery to enable States which share a common interest in protecting children to co-operate together to do so.

=== The 1996 Convention ===
The 1996 Convention is the broadest in scope of those three, covering as it does a very wide range of civil measures of protection concerning children, ranging from public measures of protection or care to matters of representation to the protection of children's property. It also covers:

- Unaccompanied minors
- Cross-frontier placements of children

== Implementation in the European Union ==
The subject of the convention is one of the subjects treated in the EU's Brussels II regulations. Between member states this regulation takes precedence over the Hague Convention as it is "at least as favourable as the rules laid down in the Convention". The subjects of convention furthermore is an area of mixed competence between the European Union and its member states, which means that the European Union has to authorise it member states to sign and to ratify the convention and state so. The European Union authorised signature and ratification in 2002 and 2008 respectively.

The ratification directive was delayed as a result of the Gibraltar dispute between Spain and the United Kingdom. In January 2008 an agreement was reached to resolve the situation to allow progress on this and other treaties. Britain and Spain compromised on a so-called "post-boxing" system under which communications between Spain and Gibraltar involving the treaties will go through London. After this deal the Convention entered into force for several EU countries, including Spain and the United Kingdom. All EU member states have ratified the convention.

== Implementation in the Russian Federation ==
The 1996 Convention entered into force in Russia on 1 June 2013. The first use of the Convention in Russia, known as the Neustadt case, concerned the retention in Russia of two minors by their father when an order made in the United Kingdom had said they should live with their mother. The case was heard by the Moscow City Court in September 2013, which ruled to recognize and enforce English court orders for a return of the children to their mother in the United Kingdom. The father appealed, but in November 2013 the Moscow City Court upheld their first ruling and the orders to return the children became final. The order was not enforced until the end of June 2014 when Russian law enforcement officials found the children, who had been kept hidden by their father for over seven months since he lost his appeal.
