= Hague Conference on Private International Law =

International organization

- Member states Other parties to HCCH conventions
- Abbreviation: HCCH
- Formation: 1893
- Founder: Tobias Asser
- Type: Intergovernmental organisation
- Headquarters: The Hague
- Members: 95 (94 member states and the European Union)
- Official language: English, French, Spanish
- Secretary General: Christophe Bernasconi
- Budget: € 5.5 million (2025–2026)
- Staff: 35 staff members 6 secondees 35 interns (2025)
- Website: hcch.net

The Hague Conference on Private International Law (HCCH) is an intergovernmental organisation in the area of private international law (also known as conflict of laws), that administers several international conventions, protocols and soft law instruments.

The Hague Conference was first convened by Tobias Asser in 1893 in The Hague. In 1911, Asser received the Nobel Peace Prize for his work in the field of private international law, and in particular for his achievements with respect to the HCCH. After World War II, the Hague Conference was established as an international organisation.

== History ==
=== A permanent diplomatic conference ===
On the initiative of Tobias Asser, the First Diplomatic Session of the HCCH was convoked in 1893. Its aim was, and remains, to "work for the progressive unification of the rules of private international law", including by creating, and assisting in the implementation of, multilateral conventions that promote the harmonisation of the rules and principles of private international law (or conflict of laws).

The First to Fourth Diplomatic Session of the HCCH took place in 1893, 1894, 1900 and 1904 respectively. They resulted in a number of multilateral treaties, the Hague Conventions, that unified the rules of private international law in the areas of Marriage (1902), Divorce (1902), Guardianship (1902), Civil procedure (1905), Effects of Marriage (1905), and Deprivation of Civil Rights (1905).

After World War I, the Fifth and Sixth Diplomatic Sessions took place in 1925 and 1928 respectively. The result of those Diplomatic Sessions was the Protocol to recognise the competence of the Permanent Court of International Justice to interpret the Hague Conventions on Private International Law.

=== Intergovernmental organisation ===
After World War II, steps were taken to establish the HCCH as an intergovernmental organisation, governed by its member states and administered by a secretariat, the Permanent Bureau. The treaty establishing the HCCH, the "Statute of the Hague Conference on Private International Law", was adopted during the Seventh Diplomatic Session of the HCCH in 1951, and entered into force on 15 July 1955.

The organisation used French as its only official language until 1964, when English was added as its second official language. The acronym HCCH is derived from the name of the organisation in these two languages (Hague Conference – Conférence de La Haye). In 2024, Spanish was added as the third official language.

== Governance ==
=== Members ===
As of 2026, the HCCH has 95 members: 94 member states and one Regional Economic Integration Organisation (REIO), the European Union.

The member states contribute to the expenses of the HCCH through their assessed contributions, which are due annually. The EU also contributes on the basis of contributions that are agreed. The Regulations on Financial Matters and Budgetary Practices of the Hague Conference on Private International Law provide the details in this regard.

=== Connected parties ===
Membership in the HCCH is not a precondition for signing, ratifying, or acceding to one or more Hague Conventions, and a total of 65 non-member states are parties to one or more conventions. The HCCH identifies them as "connected parties".

=== Governing bodies ===
The HCCH acts through several governing bodies, which are established under the Statute.

The Council on General Affairs and Policy is composed of all members. It is in charge of the operation of the HCCH and its meetings are currently held annually. Through the HCCH's secretariat, the Permanent Bureau, the Council on General Affairs and Policy ensures such operation, including by establishing the HCCH's work programme.

The Council of Diplomatic Representatives, composed of all member states, is the supreme financial and budgetary authority of the Conference and exercises oversight of the financial administration of the Conference.

Other bodies include the Netherlands Standing Government Committee (instituted by decree on 20 February 1897 to promote the codification of private international law), the Special Commissions, and the Diplomatic Sessions.

=== Permanent Bureau ===
The secretariat of the HCCH, the Permanent Bureau, is established by the Statute of the HCCH. Under the direction of the HCCH's highest governing body, the Council on General Affairs and Policy, the Permanent Bureau is charged with the preparation and organisation of the Sessions of the Hague Conference and the meetings of the Council and any Special Commissions; the work of the Secretariat of the Sessions and meetings; as well as all the tasks which are included in the activity of a secretariat.

The Permanent Bureau operates three offices, including the organisation's headquarters in The Hague, as well as its regional offices in Buenos Aires, and Hong Kong.

== Hague Conventions and other instruments ==
Since 1955, the HCCH developed 40 international conventions and protocols that establish rules on jurisdiction, applicable law, the recognition and enforcement of foreign judgments, and on legal and judicial cooperation. They are open for adoption, accession or ratification by any State, including States that are not members of HCCH.

In 2015, the HCCH adopted its first soft-law instrument, the Hague Principles on the Choice of Law in International Commercial Contracts.

=== Conventions ===
The HCCH's instruments cover subject matters in the area of family law and child protection, international civil procedure and legal cooperation, as well as cross-border commercial and finance law. These areas are often referred to as the "three pillars" of the HCCH. The following HCCH conventions are the most ratified:

- The abolition of legalisation (Apostille)
- Service of process
- Taking of evidence abroad
- International child abduction
- Intercountry adoption
- Maintenance obligations
- Choice of Court Agreements
- Hague Child Protection Convention
- The law applicable to trusts

The most recently concluded Hague convention is the Hague Judgments Convention, adopted on 2 July 2019.

=== Tools ===
The HCCH has developed several tools in order to aid in the application of its Conventions.

INCADAT is a legal database on international child abduction law containing case summaries and legal analysis of the application of the 1980 Child Abduction Convention. The website also provides additional material relevant to this area of law.

iSupport is an electronic case management and secure communication system for the cross-border recovery of maintenance obligations under the EU 2009 Maintenance regulation and the 2007 Hague Child Support Convention. In 2016 a second EU-funded project, iSupport 2.0, started. The two main aspects of this project, which will last until 2018, are the extension of iSupport to other countries and its consolidation with new functionalities.

e-App was created in support of the 1961 Apostille Convention. Its aim is to promote and assist in the implementation of low-cost, operational and secure software technology for the issuance of electronic Apostilles and for the operation of electronic registers of Apostilles that can be accessed online by recipients to verify the origin of paper Apostilles or e-Apostilles they have received.

== See also ==
- List of Hague Conventions on Private International Law
- UNIDROIT
