= United States Children's Bureau =

Organization

Agency overview
- Formed: 1912
- Headquarters: Washington, DC
- Agency executives: Julia Lathrop, Chief, 1912-1921; Grace Abbott, Chief, 1921-1934; Katherine Lenroot, Chief, 1934-1951; Martha Eliot, Chief, 1951-1956; Katherine Oettinger, Chief, 1957-1968
- Parent agency: United States Department of Health and Human Services
- Website: http://www.acf.hhs.gov/programs/cb/

The United States Children's Bureau is a federal agency founded in 1912, organized under the United States Department of Health and Human Services' Administration for Children and Families. Today, the bureau's operations involve preventing child abuse and assisting with foster care and adoption. Historically, its work was much broader, as shown by the 1912 act which created and funded it:

The said bureau shall investigate and report to [the Department of Commerce and Labor] upon all matters pertaining to the welfare of children and child life among all classes of our people, and shall especially investigate the questions of infant mortality, the birth-rate, orphanage, juvenile courts, desertion, dangerous occupations, accidents and diseases of children, employment, legislation affecting children in the several states and territories.

During the height of its influence, the Bureau was directed, managed, and staffed almost entirely by women—a rarity for any federal agency in the early 20th century. It was most influential in bringing the methods of reform-oriented social research and the ideas of maternalist reformers to bear on federal government policy.

New Deal legislation, including the Fair Labor Standards Act and Aid to Dependent Children programs, incorporated many reforms that the Children's Bureau and its network of grassroots women's organizations had supported for years. By the time the Children's Bureau was folded into the Social Security Administration in 1946, it began to assume more of its modern role.

== Organization ==
The United States Children's Bureau is a federal agency founded in 1912 under the Department of Commerce and Labor, folded into the Social Security Administration in 1946 and now organized under the United States Department of Health and Human Services' Administration for Children and Families.

== History ==
=== Creation ===
Most accounts of the Children's Bureau's origins point to three people, Lillian Wald, Edward Thomas Devine, and Florence Kelley, who began to discuss the idea around 1903. Their proposal (with colleagues) to President Theodore Roosevelt in 1905 reflected the Progressive Era's generally heightened concern for social welfare issues, as well as the influence of the Settlement movement, of which all three were members.

Also in 1905, the recently formed National Child Labor Committee (NCLC) agreed to make the establishment of a federal children's bureau its primary legislative goal. The NCLC's effort was supported by women's groups such as the National Consumers League, the General Federation of Women's Clubs, the National Congress of Mothers, and the Daughters of the American Revolution. The proposal also was endorsed by attendees of the first White House Conference on Children and Youth in 1909.

The bill establishing the Children's Bureau was passed in 1912 following a lengthy legislative effort, and it was signed by President William Howard Taft on April 9 of that year. The Children's Bureau became the first national government office in the world that focused solely on the well-being of children and their mothers.

Taft appointed Julia Lathrop as the first head of the Bureau. Lathrop, a noted maternalist reformer also active in the Settlement Movement, was the first woman ever to head a government agency in the United States.

At its founding, the bureau was part of the Department of Commerce and Labor; when the two departments' functions were separated in 1913, it became part of the Department of Labor.

=== 1912–1920 ===
The Children's Bureau's first efforts focused on decreasing infant mortality by determining how many babies were dying, through expanded birth registration efforts, and understanding why so many babies died before their first birthday. The Bureau completed birth registration campaigns and conducted infant mortality studies in 10 cities between 1914 and 1921. These studies revealed strong connections between poverty and infant deaths.

The Bureau's commitment to fighting infant mortality resonated with the proliferation of "baby-saving" campaigns throughout the country at this time. The Bureau endorsed activities such as prenatal care, infant health clinics, visiting nurses, public sanitation, certified milk stations, and education of mothers. It proclaimed a "Children's Year" beginning April 6, 1918, to protect children from shortages of milk, food, and public health nurses during World War I. A public awareness campaign successfully mobilized a vast number of women volunteers who weighed and measured millions of children, resulting in the publication of the nation's first age, height, and weight standards.

In its first few years, the Children's Bureau published several pamphlets about prenatal, infant, and child care. These booklets were soon in high demand. By 1929, the Bureau estimated that the information in its pamphlets had benefited one-half of all U.S. babies.

In 1914, Emma Octavia Lundberg became the first Director of the Social Services Division of the Children's Bureau.

National Baby Week was first observed in March 1916, at the joint suggestion of the Children's Bureau and the General Federation of Women's Clubs. The purpose was to stimulate interest in the proper care of infants and by means of exhibits and conferences, to bring to the attention of parents the standards of infant welfare which had been developed by experts who had studied the subject. In order to promote the success of this work, the Bureau prepared a pamphlet entitled Baby Week Campaigns, describing the methods used in the earlier urban baby-week observances whose success had encouraged the belief that a nation-wide observance would be practicable. This pamphlet was revised to include the best original ideas and devices developed during the campaign of 1916. A similar movement was carried on in 1917. The work begun in these campaigns was developed even more extensively in 1918 in connection with Children's Year activities.

Child labor became a focus of the Children's Bureau's efforts beginning around 1915. Between 1915 and 1930, the Bureau published 31 studies examining children's working conditions by visiting child laborers in their homes and workplaces. These studies helped to reveal the prevalence and nature of child labor in the United States. In 1916, Congress passed the Keating-Owen Act, which discouraged child labor. Congress assigned the Children's Bureau the responsibilities of administering and enforcing this law. Chief Lathrop hired noted child-labor reformer Grace Abbott to lead the Bureau's newly created Child Labor Division in April 1917; however, the law was short-lived. The Supreme Court of the United States ruled it unconstitutional in June 1918.

=== 1921–1929 ===
In August 1921, Lathrop stepped down as Chief, and Grace Abbott was appointed to succeed her.

The Children's Bureau played a major role in the passage and administration of the Sheppard–Towner Act. This law, passed in 1921, authorized the first federal grants-in-aid for state-level children's health programs. Projects in most states included some or all of the following:

- Midwife training programs, licensing, and enforcement
- Parent education through traveling health demonstrations, health centers, home visits, correspondence courses, and classes
- Establishment of standards and licensing procedures for maternity homes
- Data collection on maternal and infant mortality

The program ended in 1929, having helped an estimated 4 million infants and preschool children and approximately 700,000 pregnant women.

Maternal and infant care and child labor were the Bureau's primary focus during its first two decades. However, other topics of research included juvenile delinquency, mother's aid, illegitimacy, foster care, and children's diseases. Notably:

- In 1923, a Children's Bureau-appointed committee established the first-ever standards for effective juvenile courts.
- A 1926 bulletin summarizing the history and current state of mothers' aid legislation helped lay the groundwork for the Aid to Dependent Children provisions in the 1935 Social Security Act.
- The 1920s saw an increased focus on state and county child welfare services. The Bureau published Foster-Home Care for Dependent Children in 1923.
- The Children's Bureau conducted a study of rickets, in partnership with the Yale School of Medicine and the New Haven, Connecticut, Department of Health, that demonstrated the effectiveness of simple prevention methods.

=== 1930–1939 ===
During the early years of the Great Depression, under President Herbert Hoover, the Children's Bureau helped with government efforts to document families' needs and local relief efforts. When Congress established the Federal Emergency Relief Administration (FERA) in May 1933, the Children's Bureau helped to collect data for the agency to determine how the appropriations would be spent. The Bureau also worked with the FERA to establish the Child Health Recovery Program, providing emergency food and medical care to children in need.

In December 1934, Katherine Lenroot succeeded Abbott as Chief of the Bureau. She held this position until 1952. Lenroot, Martha May Eliot, and Grace Abbott worked together to create the child-focused sections of President Franklin D. Roosevelt's Social Security bill:

- Aid to Dependent Children provided federal matching grants for local and state mothers' aid programs.
- Maternal and Child Health Care funded clinics, professional education, and medical care for needy children.
- Crippled Children's Services created federal matching grants to help children with physical disabilities.
- Child Welfare Services provided state grants to address the needs of dependent and neglected children.

When the Social Security Act was signed in 1935, the Children's Bureau was granted authority to administer the last three of these programs. (Aid to Dependent Children was administered by the newly established Social Security Board.) The Bureau grew from distributing $337,371 in 1930 to dispensing nearly $11 million in grants by the end of the decade; its staff grew from 143 to more than 400.

In the meantime, the Children's Bureau remained active in the campaign against child labor. In 1933, the National Industrial Recovery Act (NIRA) opened the door for the Bureau to establish industry-specific child labor codes and the first federal minimum age for full-time employment. The NIRA was declared unconstitutional by the Supreme Court in May 1935. Many of its provisions, however, were recreated in the Fair Labor Standards Act passed three years later.

=== 1940–1956 ===
Throughout World War II, the Children's Bureau continued to promote the well-being of U.S. children through activities such as developing standards for day care for children of working mothers and a campaign to focus attention on children's physical and emotional needs during the war. Meanwhile, the Bureau worked with the U.S. Committee for the Care of European Children to maintain a central register of unaccompanied refugee children arriving in the United States, to oversee their placement with agencies and foster families, and to establish standards for their care.

The Children's Bureau's wartime Emergency Maternity and Infant Care (EMIC) program provided for medical, hospital, and nursing care for wives and babies of men in the four lowest pay grades of the Armed Forces. At the time, EMIC was the largest federally funded medical care program ever undertaken in the United States, serving 1.5 million women and babies between 1943 and 1949.

In 1946, the Children's Bureau was folded into the Social Security Administration as part of a massive postwar reorganization of the federal government. In this reorganization, the Bureau lost authority over all labor-related programs. On September 4, 1951, Martha May Eliot became the Bureau's fourth Chief.

In 1952, the Bureau formed the Special Juvenile Delinquency Project with foundations and other private partners interested in improving the prevention and treatment of delinquency. The Project sponsored public meetings and collaborated on a series of practice guides and professional standards. When the project ended in 1955, the Bureau's work in this area continued through a newly created Division of Juvenile Delinquency Service.

The Children's Bureau's grant-in-aid programs grew significantly in the decade following World War II:

- In maternal and child health, a growing emphasis was placed on preventing premature births and preserving these fragile infants' health.
- Bureau-funded programs helped to develop treatment options to keep children with disabilities within their own families, schools, and communities. The Crippled Children's Program expanded its reach to help children with hearing loss, cerebral palsy, cleft palate, burns, epilepsy, congenital heart defects, and other disabilities.
- Beginning in 1946, federal child welfare funds began to support children in foster care. At the same time, a growing emphasis was placed on providing services, including homemaker services, to help keep families together.

=== 1957–1968 ===
President Dwight D. Eisenhower named Katherine Oettinger the fifth Chief of the Children's Bureau on May 17, 1957. Oettinger's tenure as Chief (1957–1968) reflected a growing emphasis on preserving and strengthening families. Under her direction, the Bureau also advocated for greater protection for all parties in an adoption.

It was during this period that the Bureau's first research and demonstration grants in child welfare were authorized. Early topics included methods for meeting the needs of disadvantaged preschool children and their families (a precursor to the Head Start Program), selection of foster parents, and the well-being of adopted children and their families. In 1962, amendments to the Social Security Act authorized the Children's Bureau to make its first child welfare training grants to institutions of higher education.

The focus on maternal and infant health programs continued throughout the 1960s. The Children's Bureau provided early national leadership in the diagnosis and treatment of phenylketonuria (PKU) to prevent intellectual disability. Other special health care projects during this period included prosthetics research, epilepsy treatment, and dissemination of vaccines for polio and other childhood diseases.

The Children's Bureau also contributed to a growing awareness of child abuse, or "battered child syndrome" as it was called in the early 1960s. The Bureau held meetings with experts and drafted a model statute that states could use to require doctors and hospitals to report suspected abuse. All states enacted some form of this law by the end of 1967. The Bureau also funded grants to research causes of child abuse and effective prevention methods.

In January 1963, the Children's Bureau was moved from the Social Security Administration to the newly created Welfare Administration, reflecting a growing emphasis on coordination between child welfare services and the ADC program.

In keeping with President Lyndon B. Johnson's priorities, the Bureau's work on juvenile delinquency began to evolve into a focus on prevention and positive youth development. A Youth Services Unit was created in 1966 to encourage more proactive services to help youth transition successfully into adulthood. At the same time, the Children's Bureau continued to study ways to improve the effectiveness of juvenile court systems. In 1967, the Bureau released a revised version of its Standards for Juvenile and Family Courts. These standards, emphasizing the importance of due process for youth offenders, were cited in the groundbreaking in re Gault decision that year.

=== 1969–1979 ===
On September 17, 1969, the Children's Bureau was moved to a new Office of Child Development (OCD) within the Department of Health, Education, and Welfare's Office of the Secretary. At that time, many of the Bureau's responsibilities were assigned to other areas of the federal government. All health programs, including maternal and child health services, crippled children's services, maternity and infant care projects, and health research, were permanently relocated to the Public Health Service within the Health Services and Mental Health Administration. Today, these programs still exist within the Maternal and Child Health Bureau, Health Resources and Services Administration, U.S. Department of Health and Human Services. The Children's Bureau continued to administer research but was no longer responsible for any direct service programs, including those related to juvenile delinquency, child welfare, or families in the AFDC program. This reorganization essentially narrowed the Bureau's focus to three areas: increasing the number of foster families, helping to find permanent families for children waiting for adoption, and preventing and addressing child abuse and neglect.

In response to rising numbers of children in foster care, Children's Bureau grants during the 1970s investigated in-home services to strengthen families, family-centered casework, permanency planning, family reunification, the needs of children living with relatives, and how to remove barriers to adoption for children with special needs. The Bureau also examined the impact of workforce issues on the foster care system and supported a growing foster parents' movement through conferences and grants.

In adoption policy, the Children's Bureau's focus shifted from finding children for families to finding parents for children. Increased attention was paid to the growing number of hard-to-place children, including those from minority groups, older children, children with disabilities, and sibling groups. The Bureau supported exploration of nontraditional adoption arrangements, such as cross-cultural, transracial, single-parent, and subsidized adoption.

Passage of the Child Abuse Prevention and Treatment Act (CAPTA) of 1974 created a National Center on Child Abuse and Neglect (NCCAN) within the Children's Bureau. NCCAN centralized and coordinated the Bureau's growing focus on more effective child abuse prevention, research, state reporting laws, and systems.

=== 1980–1992 ===
President Jimmy Carter signed the Adoption Assistance and Child Welfare Act on June 17, 1980. This landmark law assigned the Children's Bureau additional responsibilities, including reporting to Congress on foster care placements, collecting and publishing data on foster care and adoption, and conducting regular audits of state child welfare programs.

During President Ronald Reagan's administration, there was a continued emphasis on family-based services, special needs adoption, and child abuse prevention. Some notable examples of the Bureau's projects during the 1980s include proclamations of the first National Child Abuse Prevention Month and National Adoption Week, establishment of a National Adoption Information Clearinghouse, and creation of the Children's Justice Act program to help states improve their handling of child abuse cases, with a particular emphasis on child sexual abuse.

Both of the Children's Bureau's present-day data collection systems, the Adoption and Foster Care Analysis and Reporting System (AFCARS) and the National Child Abuse and Neglect Data System (NCANDS), were developed during this period. Enhanced data collection resulted in a deeper understanding of the families and children affected by child abuse and neglect, foster care, and adoption. This led to legislative and policy changes during the late 1980s and early 1990s, including the establishment of a federal program to support independent living services for youth aging out of the foster care system without permanent families. In response to the HIV and crack cocaine epidemics, Congress created the Abandoned Infants Assistance program in 1988.

On April 15, 1991, today's Administration for Children and Families was created within the Department of Health and Human Services, encompassing ACYF and the Children's Bureau. The same year, NCCAN was moved out from within the Children's Bureau and became a separate entity within ACYF.

Chiefs during this period included:

- John Calhoun (1980–81)
- Clarence E. Hodges (1981–84)
- Dodie Truman Livingston (1984–89)
- Wade Horn (1989–93)

=== 1993–2000 ===
President Bill Clinton signed the Family Preservation and Support Services Program Act on August 10, 1993, as part of the Omnibus Budget Reconciliation Act of 1993 (P.L. 103-66). The family preservation program, administered by the Children's Bureau, authorized services to help families in crisis (such as respite care and intensive in-home assistance), as well as other forms of family support and family reunification. P.L. 103-66 also established the Court Improvement Program, through which the Children's Bureau provides grants to improve state courts' handling of child welfare cases, and provided additional funds for states to improve their child welfare data collection systems.

Growing awareness of the problem of child abuse and neglect, and particularly child deaths, resulted in many enhancements to prevention, investigation, and prosecution efforts. In 1996, the Children's Bureau created a new program, the Community-Based Family Resource and Support grants, to encourage public and private child abuse prevention and treatment programs to work together more effectively.

In 1995, the Children's Bureau convened an Adoption Program Network to provide input on a new National Adoption Strategic Plan. Around the same time, President Clinton encouraged HHS to develop a plan for doubling the number of adoptions and permanent placements from foster care during the next five years. HHS responded by issuing a report, with the Bureau's assistance, that outlined a series of policy- and practice-related steps toward achieving this goal. These recommendations became the framework for the Adoption and Safe Families Act (ASFA, P.L. 105-89), signed by President Clinton on November 19, 1997. The Children's Bureau was tasked with helping states bring their laws and policies into compliance with this new federal law, which focused on timely permanence, child well-being, and increased accountability of child welfare systems.

Assistant Secretaries during this period:

- Laurence J. Love (1993)
- Mary Jo Bane (1993-1996)
- Olivia Golden (1997-2000)

=== 2001-present ===
ASFA also required HHS to establish outcome measures to track State performance in protecting children. These measures were used in a series of annual reports on national outcomes for child welfare services, first published in 2000. The Child and Family Services Reviews (CFSRs), federal reviews of state child welfare systems based on these outcome measures, began in 2001. Findings from the first round of CFSRs provided more detailed information about states' strengths and needs, enabling the Bureau to create technical assistance and data collection systems more directly focused on areas of greatest need. Some examples include:

- Creation of topical Quality Improvement Centers (QICs) and Regional Implementation Centers, and increasing coordination among its network of National Resource Centers and Clearinghouses.
- Creation of a data collection system to track state independent living services for youth (the National Youth in Transition Database, NYTD, established in October 2010).
- Launch of AdoptUSKids, a comprehensive program to increase adoption opportunities for children in foster care. It includes a national photolisting website, training and technical assistance to states and tribes, and a national recruitment campaign, among other elements.

In 2003, to commemorate the 20th anniversary of the first Presidential Proclamation for Child Abuse Prevention Month, OCAN launched a yearlong National Child Abuse Prevention Initiative. Since then, support for child abuse prevention efforts has continued to expand, due in part to growing evidence that home visitation programs can effectively reduce maltreatment and improve outcomes for pregnant mothers and families with young children. In 2011, another child abuse prevention initiative kicked off at the Bureau's first Network for Action meeting.

Children's Bureau initiatives have included the following:

- Since 2000, the Children's Bureau has sponsored conferences and funded discretionary grants on the child welfare staffing crisis. It launched the National Child Welfare Workforce Institute in 2008.
- In 2009, the Bureau funded a new National Resource Center for In-Home Services to support promising practices that can help children remain safely in their homes when their families are involved (or at risk of involvement) with the child welfare system.
- In 2009, the Bureau held its first Child Welfare Evaluation Summit to explore and promote effective approaches for evaluating child welfare systems, projects, and programs.
- In 2010, the Children's Bureau awarded funding to implement the President's Initiative to Reduce Long-Term Foster Care, which seeks to improve outcomes for groups of children who face the greatest barriers to permanency.
- In 2011, the Bureau sponsored a national meeting in partnership with the U.S. Department of Education to improve educational stability and outcomes for children in foster care.

Assistant Secretaries during this period:

- Diann Dawson (2001)
- Wade Horn (2001-2007)
- Daniel Schneider (2007-2008)
- Curtis Coy (2009)
- David Hansell (2009)
- Carmen Nazario (2009-2010)
- David Hansell (2010-2011)
- George Sheldon (2011-2013)
- Mark Greenberg (2014-2017)
- Naomi Goldstein (2017)
- Amanda Barlow (2017)
- Steven Wagner ( 2017-2018)
- Lynn A. Johnson (2018-2020)
- Ben Goldhaber (2021)
- JooYeun Chang (2021-2022)
- Jennifer Cannistra (2022)
- January Contreras (2022 - 2023)
- Jeff Hild (2023–Present) (Feb 2024))
- Jerry Milner (as Acting Commissioner) (2017 - 2020)

=== Centennial ===
On April 9, 2012, the Children's Bureau marked its 100th anniversary with a ceremony at the Hubert H. Humphrey Building in Washington, DC. HHS Secretary Kathleen Sebelius, Acting Assistant Secretary for Children and Families George Sheldon, and Acting Associate Commissioner Joe Bock were among the speakers at the event. Former ACYF Commissioner Carol Wilson Spigner (Carol Williams) was given a Children's Bureau Centennial Award for her "extraordinary vision and leadership in the field of child welfare services."

== Publications ==
In its early years, the Children's Bureau published voluminously on many topics related to children's health and well-being, and it distributed its publications very widely. A full bibliography is impossible here, but an OpenLibrary search by author gives some sense of the range of topics.

Some of the Bureau's significant recent publications include the following:

- Child Abuse and Neglect User Manual Series (guides for professionals interested in preventing, identifying, and responding to child maltreatment)
- Child Maltreatment reports (annual reports of national statistics regarding reports of child abuse and neglect)
- AFCARS reports (national adoption and foster care statistics)
- Child Welfare Outcomes reports (annual reports to Congress assessing state performance in operating child protection and child welfare programs)
- Children's Bureau Express (monthly online digest)

== See also ==
- History of childhood in the United States
- Child Abuse Reform and Enforcement Act - law aiming to "promote the improvement of information on, and protections against, child sexual abuse
- Child Welfare Information Gateway
- Children's Act for Responsible Employment (CARE Act) - a bill (proposed law) to bring parity of labor conditions to minor field workers that are afforded to minors in other occupations.
- Maternalism
- Maternalist Reform
- History of public health in the United States
