= Maternalism =

Values associated with motherhood

Maternalism is the public expression of domestic values associated with motherhood. It centers on the language of motherhood to justify women's political activities, actions, and validate state or public policies. Maternalism is an extension of "empowered motherhood." It defines itself as the extension of feminine moral values of nurturance and care and the home's social caring into a larger community. Under maternalism, the mother-child relationship is essential for maintaining a healthy society. All women are seen united and defined by their ability and shared responsibility to mother all children. Using the foundations of motherhood, mothers within maternalism provide a service to the state or nation by raising "citizen-workers." 20th and 21st-century scholars have shed light on women activists in the context of maternalist politics focused on policies designed to benefit women and children, such as maternal and child health care programs, mother pensions like the ADC program and other various welfare programs. Some scholars consider maternalism to be part of feminist movements and ideologies. On the other hand, others consider it to be different from feminism due to some maternalists incorporating a shared characteristic that the male figure in the household should be the economic provider and that a woman's central role is as a mother.

== History ==
=== Origins ===
Maternalism emerged as a social and political mindset in the 18th century attached to Republican motherhood. The mindset later shaped the Congress of Mothers in the 19th century and Progressive reformers in the 20th century. Maternalism continued into the 20th century, influencing United States government reform and women in the workplace.

=== Progressive era ===
In the late 19th and early 20th centuries, settlement homes, also known as mission homes or rescue homes, became popular in American cities and urban centers. White middle-class women, who are also known as matrons, founded settlement houses. These establishments provided housing, resources, and public services to working-class individuals and newly arrived immigrants. Middle-class white women who ran these settlements offered educational services, child care, health care and offered employment to other women and mothers. Major settlement houses included Hull House in Chicago and Toynbee Hall in New York City.

In 1874, single Protestant women known as matrons founded the Presbyterian Mission Home in San Francisco and lasted into the early 20th century. According to historian Peggy Pascoe, the Presbyterian Mission Home's primary objective was to "rescue" Chinese immigrant women from prostitution and educate them about Christian gender and family norms. For Protestant women, the Christian home was a traditional ideal and value, rooted in the Victorian gender system, as well as the newer idea of "companionate marriage." Matrons who embraced the companionate marriage ideal believed the space of the mission home would provide moral values of purity and piety for the betterment of women they took in. Protestant women believed that these moral values were at the core of "true womanhood." Protestant women matrons were dedicated to their missionary work and saw their rescuing and mothering women's efforts as a professional career. On the other hand, the Mission home gave Chinese women the chance to establish marriages, seek help within their marriages, get out of arranged marriages and, find new husbands. Some Chinese women came to the Mission home to get protection from their abusive husbands. Other Chinese women went to the matrons when their husbands died and consequently became under the control of their in-laws or when they wanted to build better relationships with their relatives. Overall, the Mission home helped Chinese women establish a place in American culture and contributed to the development of the Chinese American middle-class in San Francisco and other cities in the United States.

==== Female professions ====
At the turn of the 20th century, socially acceptable occupations for middle-class white women included teaching and nursing. Women of color experienced widespread employment discrimination and became primarily regulated to specific service industries, domestic and agricultural work. In 1910, women accounted for only 5-6% of doctors, 1% of lawyers, and 1% of clergy. Women achieved tremendous success in creating new women-oriented professions than they achieved breaking into male-dominated fields, by creating jobs based on their domestic and maternal qualities, according to maternalism rhetoric and logic. For example, as home economics emerged in the 1890s at MIT and the University of Chicago, women studied science and used experiments to influence politics. Female-led labs studied ways to create cleaner water and better American sewers. Public Health Nursing establishment became alternatives to traditional nursing. The Public Health Nursing programs allowed women to have their own private practices, and they would not have to work under men. However, most women served communities who couldn't pay, which limited their resources and income. Social work primarily operated in social settlements, serving immigrant women and children. Social workers were crucial players in pushing for progressive reform.

=== Post world war II ===
Following World War II in 1945, there was a high social and political demand to reform and expand the United States daycare system. The daycare reform was mostly demanded by working women. The postwar period was a time of contradiction between home-focused gendered roles for women and increased their participation in the workforce. The postwar era included external threats like communism, and internal threats, such as emancipated women, familial disruption, and other social factors. Consequently, American society turned to the family to free themselves from some of these fears. In effect, the United States government made many public policies to protect the American family and home. Therefore, the social norm at this time was for women to stay home, so they could take care of their children and keep up their homes; this is also referred to as the "homemaker ideal." Despite women taking on the homemaker role in American postwar society, many women began to work outside the home once their children were old enough to attend school. By the 1950s, one-third of all American women worked outside the home, and about one-half worked full time. However, opportunities for women entering the workforce were very minimal, and they often earned low wages. The changing gender roles for women in the home and outside the home ultimately influenced public policy change. With the changing political discourses and labor patterns, several political organizations embraced the rhetoric of maternalism, such as the Women's Bureau, the Children's Bureau and, the ADC program.

Throughout the Post World War II era, between 1945 and the late 1960s, different forms of maternalism emerged as women increasingly joined the paid workforce more profoundly. However, American society did not encourage mothers to work outside the home; instead, they were encouraged to stay home and care for their children. Gradually, American social workers became more accepting and shifted their stances when it came to maternal employment. Historians Yvonne Zylan and Laura Curran describe the view taken by these professional social workers as one that reinforced ideas of motherhood while also trying to embrace ideas of feminism, such as a woman's individual right to work. In both cases, some social workers rejected maternal employment while others advocated and celebrated the idea of working women.

==== State maternalism ====
"State maternalism" is a term used by historian Yvonne Zylan to explore postwar maternalists and how they argued that it was the state's responsibility to protect and aid working mothers and their children.

The Children's Bureau, a federal agency under the United States branch of the United States Department of Health and Human Services Administration for Children and Families, was an organization that used the rhetoric of maternalism. The Children's Bureau dates back to 1912; Julia Lathrop, a maternalist reformer, founded the agency and later became the head chief. The organization centered around child welfare, including issues of child labor, child health, and maternal care. Similarly, the Women's Bureau, formed in 1920, studied the positive implications of women's work and took on discriminatory employment practices and daycare. Scholar Yvonne Zylan points to the founding years of these organizations situated in a "maternalist political culture," or rather they formed out of maternalist ideals that emphasized a woman's role as a mother and embraced maternal care of women. Thus a mother's role as the child's nurturer needed protection at all costs. Professionals' pro-day care stance in these groups helped support maternal care inside the home and maternal employment outside the home. However, more importantly, it prioritized children's needs, which was one of maternalism's core beliefs.

Between 1946 and 1962, The Children's Bureau and the Women's Bureau illustrated different forms of maternalism regarding the debate over adding daycare programs and its policies into the existing United States system. The Children's Bureau and maternalist activists approached the daycare program as a solution to save "poor children," whereas the Women's Bureau saw daycare (see: Early childhood education in the United States) programs as a way to resolve a "working women's" issue. Some envisioned a daycare program that would replace mother's care with top-tier trained professionals for early childhood development. Others saw a daycare program as a solution to help children with absent mothers stay out of trouble, such as falling into the criminal system or continuing the cycle of poverty. However, none of the ideas became actual policies. The daycare system debate arose when the ADC program was under attack and needed to be revised. Therefore to help fix the welfare system while simultaneously creating a daycare system, maternalist activists, social worker professionals, and many individuals within the Children's Bureau advocated that to solve the "welfare problem," recipient mothers in the ADC program must start working. Then funds could go towards building a daycare system. This argument forged a new type of maternalism that emerged in the 1960s. Historian Zylan defines this type as "state maternalism," which considers it the state's responsibility to protect and aid mothers and children. State maternalism incorporated the idea of maternal employment (mothers working outside the home) by indicating that women in the workforce would be necessary for specific demographics of women and their families. These demographics included low-income families and single mothers and argued they would need to work outside the home to live up to their duties as mothers and, in all, be good mothers. Being a good mother implied that single and low-income mothers would need to be the financial provider for their families since (for some) money was limited at this time, and being a single parent meant less income coming into the home. Social workers embracing state maternalism advocated that women and their children would be better protected by a state policy that encouraged work outside the home rather than a program that encouraged and supported women to stay at home. Many social workers and child welfare professionals argued that having a working parent in the home, like the mother, could also bring psychological benefits to the children. This new type of language put the Children's and Women's Bureau's ideas together and justified a unified daycare program for low-income women. Maternalists envisioned a daycare system that could help women become better mothers and extend it to all working mothers. This was because, under maternalism, a woman's shared responsibility was to all mothers and their nurturance and maternal care characterized them. However, it would later become known that the daycare program would only be available to mothers who were welfare recipients and who accepted employment if any was available when applying for the welfare program. In all, state maternalism helped support a daycare system that addressed the needs of "neglected" children and the needs of welfare officials and politicians who were looking to lower welfare expenditures and prevent future generations of welfare recipients.

==== Therapeutic maternalism ====
As the Aid to Families with Dependent Children (ADC) program was under question in the 1940s and 1950s after its creation in 1935, some reformers thought providing women with the option of employment might help solve issues revolving around the program. American social workers became split on the subject. Some were pro-mothers working outside the home, while others were against maternal employment. However, social workers used a psychological and a "therapeutic approach" to advocate for and against maternal employment. In the case of pro-maternal employment, social workers suggested that working mothers might better provide the psychological and developmental skills needed for their children than mothers who stayed at home. Other maternalists portrayed ADC recipients as psychologically ill and viewed working mothers as a threat. The idea was, mothers in the workforce would only be beneficial if they continued to put their child's needs ahead of their own. As a social worker named Alice Merriam stated in 1959: “Any mother thinking about taking a job should carefully consider such matters as the age of her child, his emotional readiness to be separated from her, and the possible alternative solution.” In all, while social workers, such as those within the ADC program, debated over whether or not maternal employment should be a viable option, they integrated arguments that working mothers could bring psychological and emotional benefits to the American family, and most importantly, their children.

==== Experiential and sentimental maternalism ====
During the Welfare Rights Movement in the late 1960s and early 1970s, society in the United States did not expect mothers to work outside the home. American culture centered around the male being the primary breadwinner for the family. Therefore being a mother was a job that should come before any job outside the home. Some women activists used maternalism to participate and mobilize themselves within the movement. Maternalism used during this movement had two different two forms. The first is referred to by scholar Cynthia Edmonds-Cady as "experiential maternalism," as a sub-type that aided predominantly low-income African American welfare recipients. This type approached motherhood as an everyday experience driven by their children's essential needs and included experiences of poverty, racism, and classism within the welfare program. Recipients saw their unique situation as mothers on welfare as motivation to help other low-income mothers fight for the needs of children and public assistance. Experiential maternalism in the Welfare Rights movement meant fighting for the right to be a mother; it included personal struggles and employment as a part of the maternalism rhetoric. On the other hand, Cynthia Edmonds-Cady describes "sentimental maternalism" as a sub-type used mainly by white middle-class women, who had some involvement within the Welfare Rights movement. However, these privileged women under the category of sentimental maternalism did not need or receive welfare assistance. Therefore, they did not have the same experiences as women within experiential maternalism. Rather, they felt sympathy for the mothers who were receiving welfare benefits. These personal experiences are what differentiate the women within experimental maternalism from sentimental maternalism. As a result, women used these ideals within their activism involvement, which motivated white middle-class women to become more involved in their support for the movement. During this movement, many women embracing both the experimental and sentimental maternalist mentalities saw their welfare rights activists' efforts as a larger extension of their job as mothers.

== Significant Individuals ==
=== Ellen Swallow Richards ===
A chemist who graduated from Westford Academy (second oldest secondary school in Massachusetts) in 1862 and founded Home Economics. Richards set up labs at universities across the country aimed at sanitation and teaching women the sciences. Richards was a key player in maternalist politics as she applied her scientific knowledge to domestic issues in politics, pushing for good nutrition and sanitation.

=== Lugenia Burns Hope ===
One of the first professional social workers. In 1908 in Atlanta Georgia she founded the Neighborhood Union, which aimed to mobilize and enfranchise poor black neighborhoods in the city.

=== Jane Addams ===
Co-founded Hull House in Chicago in 1889. A strong proponent for maternalist politics and progressive reform, she started many initiatives such as clean food and clean drinking water, which gained momentum in the social movement.

== Critiques ==
Maternalism has been criticized on the grounds that it keeps women out of male dominated professions. It also reinforces a normalized idea of femininity, without considering the fluidity of gender.

In the same way that advertisers had used images of strong working women to encourage women to enter the workforce in support of the war effort, advertisers after the war presented images of maternalism to pressure women to leave the workforce and return to their homes, so that positions could be filled by men returning from wartime. Women were told that their nurturing abilities would be better served waiting on their husbands and children.
