= History of childhood in the United States =

The History of childhood in the United States covers the social and cultural history of childhood in the United States from colonial times to the early 21st century. For current conditions see Youth in the United States. Over the centuries, the definition of what a child is—and what they owe to society—has undergone several radical transformations Historians emphasize the shift from "economic utility" to "emotional sacralization."

== Ethnicity, race, gender and class factors ==
=== Native Americans ===
Gemini American Indian boarding schools, also known more recently as American Indian residential schools, were established in the United States from the mid-17th to the early 20th centuries with a main primary objective of "civilizing" or assimilating Native American children and youth into Anglo-American culture. In the process, these schools denigrated American Indian culture and made children give up their languages and religion. At the same time the schools provided a basic Western education. These boarding schools were first established by Protestant and Catholic missionaries of various denominations. The missionaries were often approved by the federal government to start both missions and schools on reservations, ref>{{cite web In the late 19th and early 20th centuries especially, the government paid Church denominations to provide basic education to Native American children on reservations, and later established its own schools on reservations. The Bureau of Indian Affairs (BIA) also founded additional off-reservation boarding schools. Similarly to schools that taught speakers of immigrant languages, the curriculum was rooted in linguistic imperialism, the English-only movement, and forced assimilation enforced by corporal punishment. These sometimes drew children from a variety of tribes. In addition, religious orders established off-reservation schools. Children were typically immersed in the Anglo-American culture. Schools forced removal of indigenous cultural signifiers: cutting the children's hair, having them wear American-style uniforms, forbidding them from speaking their mother tongues, and replacing their tribal names with English language names for use at the schools, as part of assimilation and to Christianize them. Children sometimes died in the school system due to infectious disease..

=== Colonial and early national era European Americans ===
Historians since the 1980s have emphasized geography, especially the differences between the northern, middle and southern colonies. For example, migrants to New England came as families, while individuals migrated to the South. In 1620, the Virginia Company shipped ninety “younge, handsome and honestly educated maydes” to Virginia. The next year it sent fifty-seven marriageable women between the ages of fifteen and twenty-eight. Each was assigned to a would-be husband who paid the Company 120 pounds of tobacco —six times what it charged for a male indentured servant.

The colonies were a bit healthier than rural England--and much more so than London. The food supply was much better which helped reduce mortality from Disease in colonial America. Nevertheless death rates were high for infants and small children, especially from diphtheria, smallpox, yellow fever, and malaria. Epidemics were more frequent and more deadly in the warmer, wetter southern colonies.

In 17th century Andover, Massachusetts, families averaged 8.3 births; 7.2 survived to age 21. Food supplies were abundant, and the cold weather weakened epidemics. Overall, New England population growth was rapid thanks to early marriages and relatively low rates of infant and maternal mortality. Scattered farms helped keep contagous disease in check. As the colony grew after 1700 there were more and more neighbors and contagion were more and more likely, so mortality rates went up.

In an overwhelmingly rural society, farmers used children as young as six or seven to handle many chores. In the cities, at a time when schools were uncommon outside New England, girls had household and child care chores while a boy at about age 12 was apprenticed to a craftsman and lived apart from his parents. Colonial America had a surplus of good farmland and a shortage of workers, so criminals in England kidnapped London youth to spirit them away for resale in Virginia. Parliament made it a priority to catch and prosecute offenders.

In many rural towns until the 1830 or so, the apprenticeship system gave way to factory employment for poor children, and school attendance for the middle classes. At the age of 13, orphan children were sent into a trade or domestic work due to laws that sought to prevent idle children from becoming a burden to society. In the apprenticeship system, children whose parents died or are unable to support them were routinely placed outside of their homes under indenture contracts with a master who provided substance in exchange for the child’s labor. Many states during this period followed Pennsylvania's lead in enacting laws that prohibited matching children with masters who were of a different faith from the apprentice because of an expectation that masters should improve not only apprentices’ trade skills, but also their moral and religious upbringing.

In the 1840s, labor started to shift away from families, to hiring older individuals, especially new immigrants from Ireland and Canada.

=== African American slave children ===
According to historians Stephen Mintz and Susan Kellogg, even under the brutal pressures of the slave system, enslaved Blacks built remarkably resilient family structures. Notwithstanding the constant threat of separation through sale to another plantation, the enslaved usually established enduring kinship networks within the plantation system. Although slave marriages lacked legal recognition, the majority of individuals formed stable, long-term 'de facto' unions, typically residing in two-parent households. These nuclear units were reinforced by expansive extended family ties, which provided a critical buffer against the psychological and physical violence of slavery. This robust kinship framework not only ensured survival during the antebellum era but remained a foundational support system for emancipated Black communities throughout the 20th century.

Harriet Beecher Stowe wrote about a woman a slave owner bought to breed children to sell. Scholars noted, "age and physical capacity, as well as the degree of dependence, set the terms of children's integration into households". Historians portray slave children as, "virtually divorced" from the usual work routines until they were old enough to be field hands. This permitted a degree of carefree childhood for some, especially those who played with white children their age. The next step was to perform chores, such as minding younger children, picking up light trash, scaring birds away from crops, feeding poultry, or gathering eggs. If they were not needed, they could be sold separately from their mother, as happened to about 10% of all slave children. They also could be rented out to white farmers who could not afford to purchase slaves..

=== 19th century frontier ===
The nature of childhood on the American frontier is disputed. One group of scholars, following the lead of novelists Willa Cather and Laura Ingalls Wilder, argue that the rural environment was salubrious. Historians Katherine Harris and Elliott West write that rural upbringing promoted family interdependence, and in the end produced children who were more self-reliant, mobile, adaptable, responsible, independent and more in touch with nature than their urban or eastern counterparts. On the other hand, historians Elizabeth Hampsten and Lillian Schlissel offer a grim portrait of loneliness, privation, abuse, and demanding physical labor from an early age. Riney-Kehrberg takes a middle position.

=== 19th century religious aspects ===
In terms of having children. highly distinctive religious communities emerged. The most admired were the Shakers who built highly prosperous utopian settlements where women had equal status with men, but it required no marriage, no sex, and no children. At the same time but from an opposite perspective, the Mormons built their utopian communities with very strong male superiority that included polygamy. It made for very high fertility but earned unlimited outage that led to the assassination of their leader and their forced exile into remote Utah. Political pressure forced the renunciation of polygamy in the 1890s. However marriage and fertility rates remain high.

The Catholic community, while not utopian, paid close attention to sexuality and gender roles. Abortion was strongly condemned as a heinous sin. Very large families were encouraged, and birth control denounced as sinful. However, especially for the Irish Catholic women, celibacy was a high prestige alternative, with careers made possible in teaching and nursing through orders of sisters. Celibacy was required of the priests and brothers.

=== 19th century German Americans ===
Some 5.5 million Germans migrated to the U.S. from 1820 to 1920. Many were skilled mechanics who established workshops in fast growing cities such as Philadelphia, New York City, Buffalo, Cincinnati, Detroit, Chicago, St, Louis and especially Milwaukee. The largest number became farmers, selling their small old farms for enough cash to buy much larger farms in the Midwest. To the present day Midwestern farming has a German cast. In 1990 about half of the population in Wisconsin, Iowa, Minnesota, the Dakotas and Nebraska were of German descent. Germany had established international leadership in educational policy, and new American policies from kindergartens to the PhD were copied from German models. German American urban communities were bilingual, with classes in German taught in Catholic and Lutheran parochial schools, as well as many public schools. Looking at Cincinnati, Carolyn R. Toth argues that in the early 20th century, "German-Americans had been exhibiting a marked tendency towards a nearly complete assimilation into American society, and the German language had come to be used less and less." Thus by 1914 most younger German-Americans were bilingual, and probably preferred to speak English among themselves. By 1940, children who had grown up in urban bilingual households outperformed those who grew up in monolingual German speaking households. Anti-German hysteria in World War I forced German Americans to switch entirely to English, and they emerged as "old-stock" whites.

=== Teaching careers for spinsters ===
Apart from the sisterhood many Irish Catholic women never married and had careers in the urban middle class, especially as school teachers who focused their lives on children. Across the country unmarried women had a very narrow range of middle class career options, but with the rapid expansion of elementary and secondary education, good teaching opportunities were widespread across the land. The men took charge as superintendents and principals, but according to Leloudis, "despite low-paying subordinate status, women answered the call to teach for reasons of their own. Educational work offered them a public voice, an opportunity to live independently outside of marriage, and their own institutions of higher learning.".

=== Progressive Era 1890s to 1920s ===
Historian LeRoy Ashby reports that the Progressive Era (1890s to 1920s) consolidated schools, expanded the high school system, opened new colleges, and stimulated grass roots activism. The result was an explosion of local and state activity that included juvenile courts, child labor laws, child guidance clinics, kindergartens, the playground movement, progressive education, and new organizations like the Big Brothers, the Big Sisters, the Boy Scouts, Girl Scouts, and Lone Scouts). Indeed it also created the federal United States Children's Bureau. All children were targeted for help, especially those with handicaps.

==== Curtailing child labor ====
Child Labor was a special target as reformers sought to raise the minimum age for employment in factories, despite the objections of industrialists and parents. The primary goal was to increase school attendance for the long-term advantage of the children, and secondly to end the damage to growing youth employed in dangerous work environments. The newer schools had physical education programs, and hundreds of cities set up low-cost YMCA facilities.</ref>

==== Rural youth ====
Rural schools were often poorly funded, one room operations. Typically, classes were taught by young local women before they married, with only occasional supervision by county superintendents. The progressive solution was modernization through consolidation, with the result of children attending modern schools. There they would be taught by full-time professional teachers who had graduated from the states' teachers colleges, were certified, and were monitored by the county superintendents. Farmers complained at the expense, and also at the loss of control over local affairs, but in state after state the consolidation process went forward. Consolidation made possible the start of organized school sports, and soon townspeople and rural folk joined together to cheer on the local consolidated basketball and football teams against its rivals.

Numerous other programs were aimed at rural youth, especially 4-H clubs for future farmers. County fairs not only gave prizes for the most productive agricultural practices, they also demonstrated those practices to an attentive rural audience. Programs for new mothers included maternity care and training in baby care.

==== Mothers organize child study programs ====
In the 1920s, the Child Study Movement underwent a massive transformation. While it began in the late 19th century as an academic effort by psychologists like G. Stanley Hall to gather data on children, it was American mothers who energized, organized, and institutionalized the movement in the 1920s. Fathers were seldom involved. Frustrated by conflicting traditional advice and eager to apply the era's new "scientific" standards to homemaking and parenting, middle-class mothers shifted child-rearing from a private domestic duty into a rigorous, collaborative science. Mothers across the country sought out structured education rather than relying on folklore or parental instinct. They organized themselves into local study groups to read the latest psychological literature. The Child Study Association of America (CSAA) expanded rapidly under the leadership of Josette Frank, Bird Stein Gans and Sidonie Matsner Gruenberg. The CSAA organized chapters nationwide, published study guides, and translated complex psychological theories (like Behaviorism and Freudian psychology) into practical advice for everyday mothers. Organizations like the National Congress of Mothers (which evolved into the PTA) and the General Federation of Women’s Clubs provided a massive, ready-made infrastructure. Millions of mothers used these networks to form "child study circles," turning local schools and living rooms into classrooms for parental education. The Laura Spelman Rockefeller Memorial Foundation headed by Beardsley Ruml poured millions of dollars into child development. It created child research institutes at major state universities such as Iowa, Minnesota, California-Berkeley, and Toronto. To study children scientifically, researchers needed subjects, and mothers provided them by enrolling their toddlers in newly created laboratory preschools and cooperative nurseries. The Iowa Child Welfare Research Station took a leadership role. Mothers actively participated in observation. They sat behind one-way mirrors, took detailed notes on child behavior, and met with experts to discuss emotional development, temper tantrums, habit formation, and nutrition. This created a feedback loop where mothers were both the consumers and the co-creators of child-study data. Mothers provided a mass market for specialized media, demanding scientifically backed print materials over traditional housekeeping journals. For example, Children: The Magazine for Parents (launched in 1926, later renamed Parents' Magazine) brought the cutting-edge research of the university laboratory directly to the kitchen table. Mothers bought it by the hundreds of thousands, cementing parent education as a mainstream commercial industry. The mobilized mothers by 1920 had the right to vote and politicians listened to their demands. The federal Sheppard-Towner Act (1921) was landmark legislation funded prenatal and child health clinics. Mothers nationwide used federal resources to distribute literature on child hygiene, growth metrics, and development, effectively marrying the child study movement with public health. In retrospect, the movement redefined what it meant to be a "good mother." Prior generations viewed mothering as an innate spiritual or biological capability. The 1920s movement successfully established "Scientific Motherhood"—the idea that parenting was a professional skill requiring study, data, and continuous education.

=== New Deal programs ===
The New Deal of the 1930s had several major programs oriented toward children and youth. The first--and by far the most visible and popular--was the Civilian Conservation Corps (CCC) that reached three million unemployed young men age 17 to 28 whose families were on relief. They spent six months in construction camps, and were provided food, clothing and medical care. Their parents were paid $25 a month. There was a similar program for Indian reservations. Large numbers of African Americans worked in segregated CCC units. The National Youth Administration provided funding for work-study programs for students in high schools and colleges; the Aid to Dependent Children gave cash payments to millions of poor parents. Many very poor parents had placed their children in orphanages; the new program resulted in the shrinkage or closure of many orphanages. In addition, laws against child labor were tightened, forcing some youth into unemployment. President Franklin D. Roosevelt got along poorly with the educational establishment, whose leaders called for closing the CCC and NYA. Therefore there was no direct financial aid to education. However, the work relief programs such as WPA cooperated with local government to build many new public schools and playgrounds.

The Emergency Maternity and Infant Care (EMIC) program was a federally funded U.S. government initiative (1943–1949) that provided free maternity and pediatric healthcare to 1.2 million wives (and their new babies) of enlisted military personnel in the four lowest pay grades. The government also provided monthly cash allowances to wives and children whose husbands were in the armed forces.

=== The Silent Generation ===
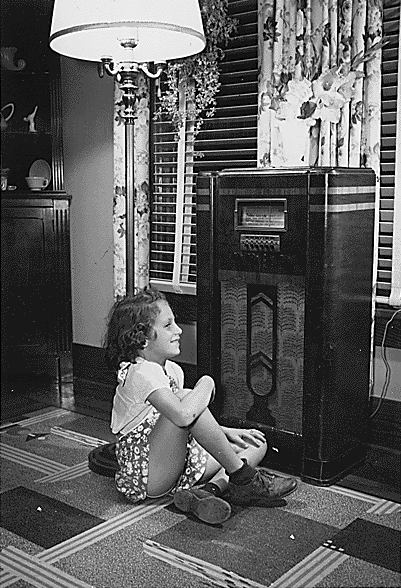
A girl listening to an expensive vacuum-tube radio during the Great Depression

The "Silent Generation" refers to Americans born between 1928 and 1945. As a cultural narrative, the Silent Generation are described as children of the Great Depression whose parents, having revelled in the highs of the Roaring Twenties, now faced great economic hardship and struggled to provide for their families. Before reaching their teens, they shared with their parents the horrors of World War II but through children's eyes. Millions lost their fathers or older siblings who were killed in the war. When the Silent Generation began coming of age after World War II, they were faced with a devastated social order of the Cold War within which they would spend their early adulthood and a new enemy in Communism via the betrayal of post-war agreements and rise of the Soviet Union. Unlike the previous generation who had fought for "changing the system," the Silent Generation was about "working within the system." They did this by keeping their heads down and working hard, thus earning themselves the "silent" label. Their attitudes leaned toward not being risk-takers and playing it safe. Fortune magazine's story on the College Class of '49 was subtitled "Taking No Chances".

Historians have concluded that because of childhood experiences during the Great Depression and the example of frugality set by their parents, Silents tended to be thrifty and even miserly. This led some members of the Silent Generation to develop hoarding behaviors in the guise of "not being wasteful".

As with their own parents, Silents tended to marry and have children young. American Silents are noted as being the youngest of all American generations in the age of marriage and parenthood. As young parents, the older members of this generation primarily produced the later baby boomers, while younger members of the generation and older members who held off raising a family until later in life gave birth to Generation X. Whereas divorce in the eyes of the previous generation was considered aberrant behavior, the Silents were the generation that reformed marriage laws to allow for divorce and lessen the stigma. This led to a historically unprecedented wave of divorces among Silent Generation couples in the United States.

As a birth cohort, Silents never rose in protest as a unified political entity. Widely seen as "following the rules" and benefiting from stable wealth creation, their Boomer and Gen X children would become estranged from them due to their different views regarding social issues of the day and their relatively decreased economic opportunity, creating a different generational zeitgeist. For example, the Boomer children were instrumental in bringing about the counterculture of the 1960s, and the rise of left wing, liberal views considered anti-establishment, which went directly against the "work within the system" approach that many Silents had practiced. Gen X children grew up in the 1970s and 1980s with the threat of nuclear annihilation hanging over them and a resultant bleak view of the future, contributing to their generational disaffection, in contrast to the optimistic outlook of their Silent Generation parents.

The style of parenting from the Lost Generation or the Interbellum Generation (older members of the Greatest Generation) was known to the Silents and the generations before them originated in the late 1800s, when the Lost Gens were children or teenagers. Representative of this was the idea that "children should be seen but not heard". These ideas were ultimately challenged following the 1946 publication of the book The Common Sense Book of Baby and Child Care by Benjamin Spock, which influenced some Boomers' views on parenting and family values when they became parents themselves. The book also influenced how baby boomers were parented. These less-restrictive behavioral standards, seen as overly permissive by the Silents, further estranged those Boomers from their parents and, among other things, gave rise in the 1970s to the term generation gap. This was to describe the initial conflict of cultural values between the Silents and Generation Jones (younger baby boomers) and to a lesser extent their Generation X children in the 1980s, although it was not quite as extreme as it was between the Greatest Generation and the "Leading Edge Boomers" (older baby boomers) in the 1960s.

=== Teenage culture ===
By the 1920s national advertising agencies were discovering a rich new market for consumer goods among a group they termed "teenagers". The new laws against child labor and the very rapid expansion of high school enrollment meant that fewer young people were employed full time. Teens were now spending time with each other and developing their own lingo, hangouts, clothing styles, and attitudes.

=== Jim Crow childhood: racial segregation ===
Educational experiences for Black children in the American South before the Supreme Court outlawed school segregation in the 1954 were sites of systemic underfunding and state-sanctioned inequality, yet they also served as vital centers of resilience, pride, and intellectual cultivation for the African American community. Following the 1896 Plessy v. Ferguson decision, "separate but equal" became the law of the land. All Southern states set up dual public school systems paid for by taxes. In every state the white schools were better funded and white teachers better paid. In the Progressive Era, state and federal laws increasingly prohibited child labor, primarily to encourage school attendance. Despite the inferior resources, Black educators developed a "hidden curriculum" designed to counteract the era’s prevailing racial ideologies. Teaching was a much more prestigious career in the Black community, where teachers emphasized dignity, self-worth, and achievement to protect students from the psychological toll of Jim Crow. Major white philanthropists led by John D. Rockefeller Jr. and Julius Rosenwald donated millions of dollars to support black schools. Booker T. Washington, head of a black college in Alabama, became the intellectual and political leader of the Black community nationwide. In a highly segregated society where Black people were excluded from public parks, libraries, and theaters, the school became a primary safe space. Schools hosted plays, graduation ceremonies, concerts, and athletic events that served the entire community.

=== Hispanic Americans ===
Hispanic children are typically raised to show deference to parents and elders, to contribute to household responsibilities, and to maintain strong ties to immediate and extended family members. These expectations reflect the collectivist orientation common in many Hispanic cultures, where a child's behavior is seen as reflective of the family’s values and reputation. Even from a young age, children may take on roles that support the family—such as caring for siblings, translating for non-English-speaking parents (in immigrant households), or assisting in family businesses.

Parental involvement is often characterized by protective and authoritative parenting styles, emphasizing obedience, guidance, and close emotional bonds. As children mature, they may continue to live with parents longer than in many non-Hispanic white families, with multi-generational living arrangements being common, especially in economically constrained or newly immigrated households.

Despite the strong influence of tradition, shifts have occurred due to factors such as immigration, acculturation, and exposure to more individualistic societal norms. U.S.-born Hispanic children may experience tensions between familial expectations and mainstream cultural values, particularly regarding independence and decision-making. While many latino youth encounter acculturation and enculturation, there is an increased risk of depression for latino teenagers, particularly girls, associated with acculturation.

== Legal aspects ==
=== Juvenile courts ===
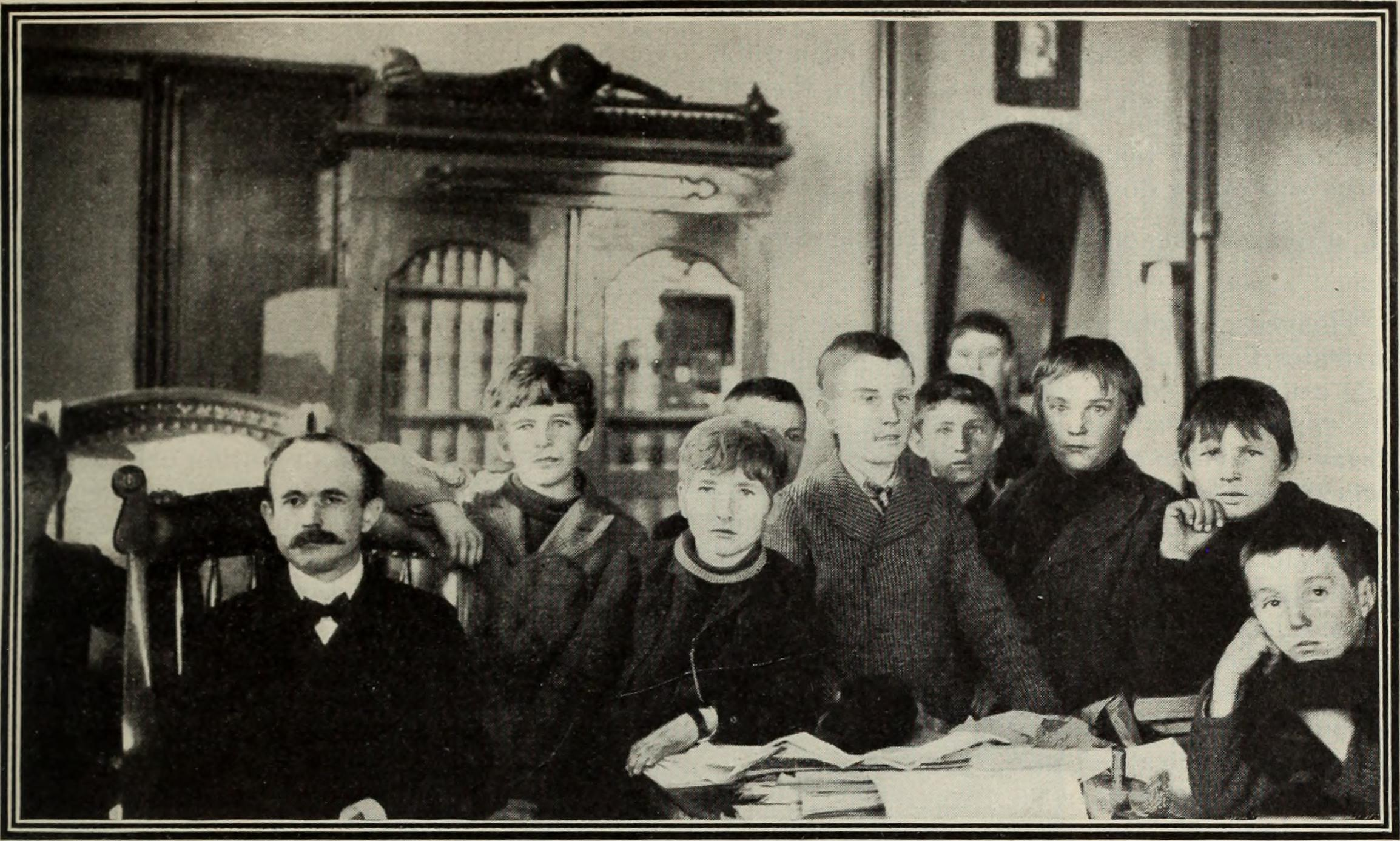
Judge Ben B. Lindsey, of Denver, Colorado, with some of his boys.Review of reviews and world's work (1890) (14784362802)

By the 1890s reformers in the emerging Progressive Era warned that the regular court system was designed to handle adult criminals. It was unprepared to handle troubled teenagers. Ben B. Lindsey of Denver Colorado, was a pioneer in the establishment of the juvenile court system. Through his efforts, an act was passed creating a juvenile court in Denver. It marked an important advance in relation of the law to children and served as a model for future juvenile courts across America. Lindsey served as judge of the Denver juvenile court in 1901–1927.

=== Orphans, adoptions and orphanages ===
In colonial and early America, orphanages that housed dependent children were rare but became increasingly popular between 1830 and 1860 following challenges associated with immigration, urban poverty, and public health crises like the cholera epidemic. The earliest orphanages were private, religiously affiliated institutions that formed as a reaction to the harsh living conditions experienced by children in public poorhouses. In 1790, the Charleston Orphan House in South Carolina became the first public orphanage in the country. The Catholic Church and the major Protestant denominations set up and operated orphanages to help theie own distressed families families. The Catholics began in1806 in Philadelphia. There were 75 Catholic orphanages nationwide in 1860 and over 250 in 1900.

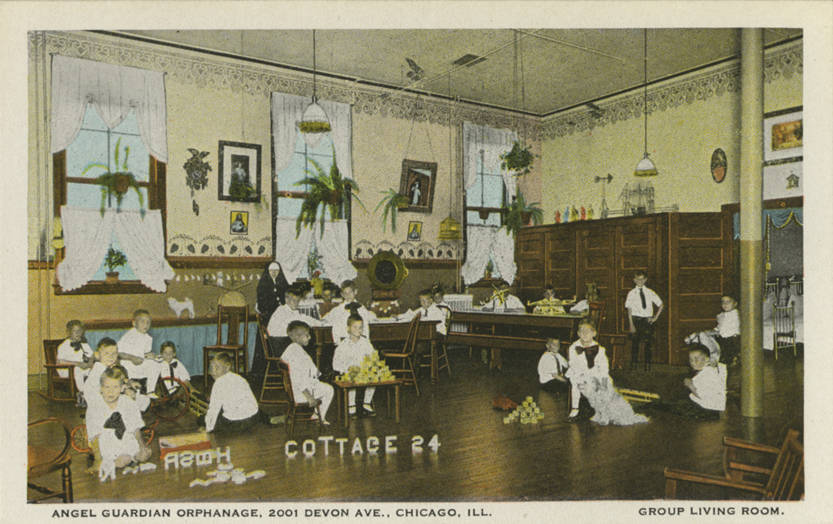
Angel Guardian Orphanage in Chicago (1922)

After the Civil War, state and local governments became even more involved in regulating and founding orphanages across the country. The primary drivers of this increased involvement was the need to provide for war orphans, the growing opposition to placing children in poorhouses, and the development of new child abuse laws and enforcement machinery. By 1900 some 1,000 orphanages across the country served about 100,000 boys and girls. They housed two-thirds of children living outside their homes. That came to about 3% of the national child population. Over the next decades, however, increasingly these children were not sent to orphanages but to private families through foster care. After 1935 the Social Security Act further improved conditions by authorizing Aid to Families with Dependent Children as a part of social security.

=== Foster care and orphan trains ===
In foster care, a state child protective services (CPS) agency or a court determines that the child is at risk of harm due to abuse, neglect, or abandonment. The government moves to the care of an independent family, and pays for its expenses. The family is responsible for supervision and education. Formal foster care began as a result of the efforts of Charles Loring Brace, who founded the Children's Aid Society in New York City in 1853 after he warned that nearly 30,000 homeless or neglected children lived on the city streets., Brace took these children off the streets and placed them with selected religious farm families around the nation. Between 1853 and his death in 1890, Brace transported over 120,000 children by train, giving name to the Orphan Train Movement. When Brace died in 1890, his sons took over his work of the Children's Aid Society until they retired.

The foster care approach pioneered by Brace and the Children's Aid Society became the basis similar operations in all the states. Currently foster care is based on the federal Adoption and Safe Families Act of 1997.

From 1999 to 2019, over 9 million children were removed from their families and placed in foster homes. Since 1900 the policy is to keep the child in the same community, preferably with relatives who can provide good levels of care. As of 2022 there were about 370,000 children nationally located in foster homes. On average, a spends two birthdays in the system.

== See also ==
- Youth in the United States, for current issues
- African-American family structure
- Aid to Families with Dependent Children, part of Social Security law of 1935
- Childhood studies
- Child labor in the United States
- Family structure in the United States
- Foster care in the United States
- History of childhood
- History of education in the United States
  - Early childhood education
- History of women in the United States
- Juvenile delinquency in the United States
- Orphans
- Timeline of children's rights in the United States
- United States Children's Bureau

== Bibliography ==
=== Scholarly studies ===
- Block, James E. The Crucible of Consent: American Child Rearing and the Forging of Liberal Society (2012)
- Bradbury, Dorothy E. Four Decades of Action for Children: A History of the Children's Bureau ((Children's Bureau, 1956) online
  - Bradbury, Dorothy E. "Five Decades of Action for Children: A History of the Children's Bureau" (Children's Bureau, 1962); not online
- Carroll, Bret, ed. American masculinities: A historical encyclopedia (SAGE, 2003). online
- "Child Employing Industries," Annals of the American Academy of Political and Social Science Vol. 35, Mar., 1910 JSTOR i242607, 32 essays by American experts in 1910
- Chudacoff, Howard. Children at Play: An American History (2008). online
- Clement, Priscilla Ferguson, and Jacqueline S. Reinier, eds. Boyhood in America: An Encyclopedia (2 vol. ABC CLIO, 2001). online
- Coleman, Marilyn J., and Lawrence H. Ganong, eds. The social history of the American family: An encyclopedia (Sage Publications, 2014) online.
- Coles, Robert . Children of Crisis (5 vol. 1967 to 1977) a social study of American children. See the article Children of Crisis
- Del Mar, David Peterson. The American Family: From Obligation to Freedom (Palgrave Macmillan; 2012) 211 pages; the American family over four centuries. online
- Fass, Paula, ed. Encyclopedia of Children and Childhood: In History and Society, 3 vols. (2004).
- Fass, Paula and Michael Grossberg, eds. Reinventing Childhood After World War II (University of Pennsylvania Press. 2012) 182 pages; scholarly essays on major changes in the experiences of children in Western societies, with a focus on the U.S.
- Fieldston, Sara. Raising the World: Child Welfare in the American Century (Harvard University Press, 2015) 316 pp.
- Fischer, David Hackett. Albion's Seed: Four British Folkways in America (1989) in-depth comparison before 1860 of family patterns of New England Puritans, Pennsylvania Quakers, Southern Cavaliers, and Southern Scots-Irish. online
- Graff, Harvey J. Conflicting Paths: Growing Up in America (1997), a theoretical approach that uses a great deal of material from children
- Griswold, Robert L. Fatherhood in America: A History (1993) online
- Hawes, Joseph M. and Elizabeth Nybakken, eds. American Families : A Research Guide and Historical Handbook (Greenwood, 1981)
- Hindman, Hugh D. Child Labor: An American History (2002)
- Hiner, N. Ray, and Joseph M. Hawes, eds. Growing Up in America: Children in Historical Perspective (1985), essays by leading historians
- Holt, Marilyn Irvin. Cold War Kids: Politics and Childhood in Postwar America, 1945–1960 (University Press of Kansas; 2014) 224 pages; emphasis on the growing role of politics and federal policy
- Illick, Joseph E. American Childhoods (2002).
- Jenkins, Henry. Where the Wild Things Were: Boyhood and Permissive Parenting in Postwar America. (New York University Press, 2025)
- Klapper, Melissa R. Small Strangers: The Experiences of Immigrant Children in America, 1880–1925 (2007) online
- LaRossa, Ralph. The modernization of fatherhood: a social and political history (1997) online
- Marten, James, ed. Children and Youth in a New Nation (2009) online
- Marten, James, ed. Children and Youth during the Civil War Era (2012) online
- Marten, James, ed. The Children's Civil War (2000) online
- Marten, James, ed. Children and Youth During the Gilded Age and Progressive Era (NYU, 2014)
- Marten, James, ed. Childhood and Child Welfare in the Progressive Era: A Brief History with Documents (2004), includes primary sources
- Martschukat, Jürgen. American Fatherhood: A Cultural History (New York University Press, 2019). online
- Mintz, Steven. Huck's Raft: A History of American Childhood (2004). online
- Mofford, Juliet. Child Labor in America (1970)
- Riney-Kehrberg, Pamela. Childhood on the Farm: Work, Play, and Coming of Age in the Midwest (2005). online
- Riney-Kehrberg, Pamela. The Nature of Childhood: An Environmental History of Growing Up in America since 1865 (2014) online
- Rosenberg , Chaim M. Child Labor in America: A History (2013) online
- Smallwood, Mary Anne Norman. "Childhood on the Southern Plains Frontier, 1870-1910" (PhD dissertation, Texas Tech University; ProQuest Dissertations & Theses, 1975. 7617763).
- Steinfels, Margaret O'Brien. Who's Minding the Children? The History and Politics of Day Care in America (1973)
- Tuttle, Jr. William M. Daddy's Gone to War: The Second World War in the Lives of America's Children (1995) online
- Ulrich, Laurel Thatcher. Good wives: Image and reality in the lives of women in northern New England, 1650-1750 (Oxford UP, 1980) online .
- West, Elliott. Growing Up with the Country: Childhood on the Far Western Frontier (1989) online
- West, Elliott, and Paula Petrik, eds. Small Worlds: Children and Adolescents in America, 1850–1950 (1992)
- Zelizer, Viviana A. Pricing the Priceless Child: The Changing Social Value of Children (1994) focus on life insurance policies. online

=== Delinquency, juvenile courts and reformers ===
- Ashby, LeRoy. Saving the Waifs: Reformers and Dependent Children, 1890-1917 Temple UP, 1984) online
- Broderick, Harold T. "History: The Evolution of Juvenile Justice." in Inequalities in the Early Years (Routledge, 2018) pp. 81–94.
- Campbell, D’Ann. “Judge Ben Lindsey and the Juvenile Court Movement 1901–1904.” Arizona and the West 18#1 (1976), pp. 5–20 online
- Clapp, Elizabeth Jane. "The origins and development of juvenile courts in the United States during the Progressive Era, c. 1870-1910" (PhD dissertation, U of London, University College London; 1991 ). online
- Cohen, Ronald D. "Child-saving and Progressivism, 1885–1915." in American Childhood, edited by Joseph Hawes and N. Ray Hiner. (Greenwood, 1985), Pp.273–309
- Cravens, Hamilton. "Child-Saving in the Age of Professionalism, 1915–1930." in American Childhood, edited by Joseph Hawes and N. Ray Hiner. (Greenwood, 1985). Pp. 415–488
- Fox, Sanford J. "Juvenile Justice Reform: An Historical Perspective." Stanford Law Review (1970) 22:1187––1239.
- Hawes, Joseph M. Children in Urban Society: Juvenile Delinquency in Nineteenth-Century America (Oxford UP, 1971) online
- Ketcham, Orm W. "The Development of Juvenile Justice in the United States." in The Changing Faces of Juvenile Justice, edited by V. Lome Stewart. (New York University Press, 1978), Pp. 9-42. online
- Kretzmann, Martin J. “The Kid’s Judge: Institutional Innovation in Early Denver Juvenile Court under Judge Ben B. Lindsey, 1901–1927” (PhD dissertation, U Denver 1997;)
- Leal, K. Elise. " 'All Our Children May be Taught of God': Sunday Schools and the Roles of Childhood and Youth in Creating Evangelical Benevolence." Church History (2018). 87(4), 1056–1090. doi:10.1017/S0009640718002378
- Macleod, David I. Building Character in the American Boy: The Boy Scouts, YMCA, and their Forerunners, 1870-1920 (U of Wisconsin Press, 1983) online
- Mechling, Jay, On My Honor: Boy Scouts and the Making of American Youth ( U of Chicago, 2004) online
- Platt, Anthony M. The Child Savers: The Invention of Delinquency (University of Chicago Press, 1969).
- Sutton, John R. Stubborn Children: Controlling Delinquency in the United States, (U California Press, 1988) online
- Sutton, John R. "The juvenile court and social welfare: Dynamics of progressive reform." Law & Society Review 19.1 (1985): 107-145.
- Sutton, John R. "Social structure, institutions, and the legal status of children in the United States." American Journal of Sociology 88.5 (1983): 915-947. online

=== Orphans, adoptions, and foster care ===
- Ashby, Leroy. Endangered Children: Dependency, Neglect, and Abuse in American History (Twayne 1997), covers the transformation of orphanages into residential treatment centers in since 1945.
- Berebitsky, Julie. Like Our Very Own: Adoption and the Changing Culture of Motherhood, 1851-1950 (2000) ISBN 0700610510
- Carp, E. Wayne, ed. Adoption in America: Historical Perspectives (2003) ISBN 0472109995
- Chmidling, Catherine. History of the Kansas Orphans’ Home, 1887–1962: The Professionalization of Charity (Edwin Mellen, 2010);
- Cmiel, Kenneth. A Home of Another Kind: One Chicago Orphanage and the Tangle of Child Welfare (U of Chicago Press, 1995).
- Crenson, Matthew A. Building the Invisible Orphanage: A Prehistory of the American Welfare System (Harvard UP, 2009) online; argues the modern welfare system was designed to eliminate the old orphanages.
- Hacsi, Timothy A. A Second Home: Orphan Asylums and Poor Families in America (1997) ISBN 0674796446
- Herman, Ellen. "Kinship by Design: A History of Adoption in the Modern United States (2008) ISBN 978-0-226-32760-0
- Katz, Elizabeth D. "Fostering faith: Religion and inequality in the history of child welfare placements." Fordham Law review 92 (2023): 2077–2149. online.
- Kleinberg, S. J. Widows And Orphans First: The Family Economy And Social Welfare Policy, 1880-1939 (2006) ISBN 0252030206
- McKenzie, Richard B., ed. Home away from home : the forgotten history of orphanages (2008) ten scholarly articles; table of contents
- Miller, Julie. Abandoned: Foundlings in Nineteenth-Century New York City (2007) ISBN 0814757251
- O’Connor, Stephen. Orphan Trains: The Story of Charles Loring Brace and the Children He Saved and Failed (U of Chicago Press, 2004)
- Søland, Birgitte. " 'Never a Better Home': Growing Up in American Orphanages, 1920–1970." Journal of the History of Childhood and Youth 8.1 (2015): 34-54. excerpt

=== Teenagers ===
- Bainbridge, David. Teenagers: A natural history (Greystone Books, 2009) online.
- Breines, Wini. Young, White, and Miserable: Growing Up Female in the Fifties (Beacon Press, 1992);
- Douglas, Susan J. Where the Girls Are: Growing Up Female with the Mass Media (Times Books, 1994)
- Fasick, Frank A. "On the 'invention' of adolescence." The journal of early adolescence 14.1 (1994): 6-23.
- Fass, Paula. The Damned and the Beautiful: American Youth in the 1920s (Oxford UP, 1977)
- Graebner, William. Coming of Age in Buffalo: Youth and Authority in the Postwar Era (Temple University Press, 1990)
- Green, Ronald Simonds, Jr. "Innovation, imitation, and resisting manipulation: The first twenty years of American teenagers, 1941-1961" (PhD dissertation, University of Oklahoma; ProQuest Dissertations & Theses, 1998. 9914408).
- Hine, Thomas. The Rise and Fall of the American teenager (1999), popular history of 19th and 20th century experiences; online
- Jessup, Molly. "Creating the American teenager: Experts, authority, and youth in the Cold War" (PhD dissertation, Syracuse University; ProQuest Dissertations & Theses, 2015. 3723265), online at academic libraries
- Kett, Joseph F. Rites of Passage: Adolescence in America 1790 to the Present (1977) online
- Kett, Joseph F. "Reflections on the history of adolescence in America." The History of the Family 8.3 (2003): 355-373.
- Lerner, Jacqueline V., Richard M. Lerner, and Jordan Finkelstein, eds. Adolescence in America: An Encyclopedia (2 volumes, Bloomsbury Publishing USA, 2001) online
- Medovi, Leerom. Rebels: Youth and the Cold War Origins of Identity (Duke U Press, 2005) online
- Modell, John. Into one's own: From youth to adulthood in the United States, 1920-1975 (U of California Press, 1989) online.
- Palladino, Grace. : Teenagers: An American History (1996)
- Remmers, H. H. and D. H. Radler. The American Teenager (Bobbs Merrill, 1957), how they think according to public opinion polls online
- Schrum, Kelly. Some wore bobby sox: the emergence of teenage girls' culture, 1920-1945 (2004) online
  - Schrum, Kelly R. "Some wore bobby sox: The emergence of teenage girls' culture, 1920–1950" (PhD dissertation, Johns Hopkins University; ProQuest Dissertations & Theses, 2000. 9993184) online at academic libraries.
- Snowden, Lorraine Caroline. "Constructing the Canadian teenager: the Star Weekly Magazine and representations of the young during the late 1940s" (Diss. University of British Columbia, 1997), online at academic libraries.
- Ugland, Richard Maring. "The Adolescent Experience during World War II: Indianapolis as a Case Study" (PhD dissertation, Indiana University; ProQuest Dissertations & Theses, 1977. 7805584), online at academic libraries.
- Zuckerman, Michael. "The paradox of American adolescence." The Journal of the History of Childhood and Youth 4.1 (2011): 11-25.

=== Race and slavery ===
- Anderson, James D. The Education of Blacks in the South, 1860-1935 (U North Carolina Press, 1988) online.
- Bernstein, Robin. Racial Innocence: Performing American Childhood from Slavery to Civil Rights (2011) online edition
- Bremner, Robert H. ed. Children and Youth in America: Volume I: 1600-1865 (Harvard U.P. 1974) pp. 324-346; 374-392; 513-559; excerpts from primary sources.
  - also Children and Youth in America: Volume III: 1933-1973 Parts 5–7 (Harvard U.P. 1974) pp. 1665–1711, excerpts from primary sources.
- Bullock, Henry Allen. A History of Negro Education in the South from 1619 to the Present (Harvard U.P. 1967) online
- Davie, Maurice R. Negroes in American Society (1949) ch. 9, 11. online
- Frazier, E. Franklin. The Negro Family in the United States (U of Chicago Press, 1940); includes primary documents and statistics pp.491-640. online
- Johnson, Charles S. Growing up in the Black Belt: Negro Youth in the Rural South (1941) online
- King, Wilma. Stolen childhood: Slave youth in nineteenth-century America (2nd ed. Indiana UP, 2011) online.
- Lareau, Annette. Unequal Childhoods: Class, Race, and Family Life (U of California Press, 2003) online
- Peterson, Carla L. Black Gotham: A Family History of African Americans in Nineteenth-Century New York City (Yale UP, 2011).
- Pierce, Truman M. et al. White and Negro Schools in the South (1955) online

=== Historiography ===
- Brewer, Holly. "Children and Parents." in A Companion to Colonial America ed. by Daniel Vickers, (Blackwell, 2006) pp. 236-258.
- Cunningham, Hugh. "Histories of Childhood," American Historical Review, Oct 1998, Vol. 103 Issue 4, pp 1195–1208 JSTOR 2651207
- Fass, Paula. The End of American Childhood: A History of Parenting from Life on the Frontier to the Managed Child (2016) online
- Fass, Paula. "The World is at our Door: Why Historians of Children and Childhood Should Open Up," Journal of the History of Childhood and Youth, Jan 2008, Vol. 1 Issue 1, pp 11–31 on U.S.
- Graff, Harvey J. "Interdisciplinary Explorations in the History of Children, Adolescents, and Youth--for the Past, Present, and Future." Journal of American History (1999): 1538-1547. online
- Graff, Harvey J. ed. Growing up in America: historical experiences (Wayne State UP, 1987), essays by scholars
- Hawes, Joseph M. and N. Ray Hiner. "Hidden in Plain View: The History of Children (and Childhood) in the Twenty-First Century," Journal of the History of Childhood & Youth, (2008) 1#1 , pp 43–49; on U.S.
- Maza, Sarah. "The kids aren’t all right: Historians and the problem of childhood." American Historical Review 125.4 (2020): 1261-1285.
- Stearns, Peter N. "Challenges in the History of Childhood," Journal of the History of Childhood and Youth, Jan 2008, Vol. 1 Issue 1, pp 35–42, global perspective.
- West, Elliott. Growing Up in Twentieth-Century America: A History and Reference Guide (1996)

=== Primary sources ===
- Abbott, Grace, ed. The Child and the State (2 vol 1938, 1947)
- Bremner, Robert H. et al. eds. Children and Youth in America, Volume I: 1600–1865 (1970); Children and Youth in America: A Documentary History, Vol. 2: 1866–1932 (2 vol 1971); Children and Youth in America: A Documentary History, Vol. 3: 1933–1973 (2 vol. 1974). 5 volume set. Hundreds of primary sources for each period. online at Google Books
- Fass, Paula, and Mary Ann Mason, eds. Childhood in America (NYU Press, 2000), 725pp; short excerpts from 178 primary and secondary sources
- Scott, Donald M., and Bernard Wishy, eds. America's Families: A Documentary History (1982) about 250 excerpts from 1600 to 1980 in 590 pages.
