= Court Improvement Project =

The Court Improvement Project was created as part of the US federal Omnibus Budget Reconciliation Act (OBRA) of 1993, Public Law 103-66. OBRA designated a portion of these funds ($5 million in fiscal year 1995 and $10 million in each of FYs 1996 through 1998) for grants to state court systems to conduct assessments of their dependency courts, and to develop and implement a plan for system improvement. The Adoption and Safe Families Act of 1997 (ASFA), Public Law 105-89, reauthorized the CIP through 2001, which Congress funded at $10 million annually. There were no substantive changes made to the CIP in the 1997 reauthorization.

The Promoting Safe and Stable Families Amendments of 2001, Public Law 107-133, reauthorized the Court Improvement Program through FY 2006. The law also expanded the scope of the program to: (1) include improvements that the highest courts deem necessary to provide for the safety, well-being, and permanence of children in foster care, as set forth in ASFA; and (2) implement a corrective action plan, as necessary, in response to findings identified in a child and family services review of the State's child welfare system. Public Law 107-133 authorizes a mandatory funding level of $10 million for CIP and new discretionary funding for FYs 2002 through 2006. From any discretionary funding appropriated annually for the Promoting Safe and Stable Families Program, the law authorizes a 3.3 percent set-aside for the CIP. Finally, the Court Improvement Program authority was transferred to a new section 438 of the Social Security Act.

A substantial increase in funding for CIP occurred in 2006, when two additional ten million dollar grants were authorized.

Funded in 2004 by the Children's Bureau, U.S. Department of Health and Human Services (HHS), the National Evaluation of the Court Improvement Program is a five-year study being carried out by a partnership of three organizations consisting of Planning and Learning Technologies (Pal-Tech, Inc.) of Arlington, VA; The Urban Institute of Washington, DC; and The Center for Policy Research of Denver, Colorado
