= Emergency Maternity and Infant Care =

The Emergency Maternity and Infant Care (EMIC) program was a federally funded U.S. government initiative (1943–1949) that provided free maternity and pediatric healthcare to wives (and their new babies) of enlisted military personnel. It was administered by the Children's Bureau of the Labor Department. The government also provided monthly cash allowances to all wives and children whose husbands were in the armed forces.

EMIC, introduced in March 1943 by the Children's Bureau, provided free maternity care and medical treatment during an infant's first year for the wives and children of military personnel in the four lowest enlisted pay grades. One out of seven births nationwide was covered during its operation. EMIC paid $127 million to state health departments to cover the care of 1.2 million new mothers and their babies. The average cost of EMIC maternity cases completed was $92.49 for medical and hospital care. A striking effect was the sudden rapid decline in home births as most mothers now had paid hospital maternity care.

== See also ==
- History of childhood in the United States
- New Deal
- Presidency of Franklin D. Roosevelt (1941–1945)
- United States home front during World War II
