= Child and Family Services Review =

In the United States, Child and Family Services Reviews (CFSR) are conducted by the federal Children's Bureau, within the United States Department of Health and Human Services, to help states improve safety, permanency and well-being outcomes for children and families who receive services through the child welfare system. The Bureau conducts the reviews to ensure conformity with federal child welfare requirements, to determine what is actually happening to children and families in child welfare services, and to assist states in helping children and families achieve positive outcomes. The CFSRs monitor States' conformity with the requirements of title IV-B of the Social Security Act. The first round of reviews took place between 2000 and 2004 and the second round took place between 2007 and 2010. In both rounds, all States were required to implement Program Improvement Plans (PIPs) as part of the review process. The third round of CFSRs took place between 2015 and 2018; a complete aggregate report of those findings has yet to be released.

Specifically, the CFSRs measure seven outcomes and seven systemic factors. The outcomes measured include whether children under the care of the State are protected from abuse and neglect; whether children have permanency and stability in their living conditions; whether the continuity of family relationships and connections is preserved for children; whether families have enhanced capacity to provide for their children's needs; and whether children receive adequate services to meet their physical and mental health needs. The systemic factors measured by the CFSRs include the effectiveness of the State's systems for child welfare information, case review, and quality assurance; training of child welfare staff, parents, and other stakeholders; the services that support children and families; the agency's responsiveness to the community; and foster and adoptive parent licensing, recruitment, and retention. Significant financial penalties may be assessed for failure to make the improvements needed to achieve substantial conformity. Each state's Program Improvement Plan must include measurable goals for improvement, action steps, and an implementation timeline for addressing each outcome that did not meet the requirements for the seven federal child welfare outcomes and seven systemic factors under review in the CFSR process.

== Outcomes ==
- Safety
  1. Children are, first and foremost, protected from abuse and neglect
    1. Timeliness of initiating investigations of reports of child maltreatment
    2. Repeat maltreatment
  2. Children are safely maintained in their homes whenever possible and appropriate
    1. Services to family to protect children in home and prevent removal
    2. Risk of harm to child
- Permanency
  1. Children have permanency and stability in their living situations
    1. Foster care re-entries
    2. Stability of foster care placement
    3. Permanency goal for child
    4. Reunification, Guardianship or Permanent Placement with Relatives
    5. Adoption
    6. Permanency goal of other planned permanent living arrangement
  2. The continuity of family relationships and connections is preserved for children
    1. Proximity of foster care placement
    2. Placement with siblings
    3. Visiting with parents and siblings in foster care
    4. Preserving connections
    5. Relative placement
    6. Relationship of child in care with parents
- Well-being
  1. Families have enhanced capacity to provide for their children's needs
    1. Needs and services of child, parents, foster parents
    2. Child and family involvement in case planning
    3. Worker visits with child
    4. Worker visits with parent
  2. Children receive appropriate services to meet their educational needs
    1. Educational needs of the child
  3. Children receive adequate services to meet their physical and mental health needs
    1. Physical health of the child
    2. Mental health of the child

== Systemic Factors ==
- Statewide information system
  1. The State is operating a statewide information system that, at a minimum, can readily identify the status, demographic characteristics, location and goals for the placement of every child who is in foster care
- Case Review System
  1. Provides a process that ensures that each child has a written case plan to be developed jointly with the child's parent(s) that includes the required provisions
  2. Provides a process for the periodic review of the status of each child, no less frequently than once every 6 months, either by a court or by an administrative review
  3. Provides a process for termination of parental rights proceedings in accordance with the provisions of the Adoption and Safe Families Act
  4. Provides a process for foster parents, pre-adoptive parents, and relative caregivers of children in foster care to be notified of, and have an opportunity to be heard in, any review or hearing held with respect to the child
- Quality Assurance System
  1. The State has developed and implemented standards that ensure that children in foster care are provided quality services that protect the safety and health of the children
  2. The State is operating an identifiable quality assurance system that is in place in the jurisdictions where the services included in the CFSP are provided, evaluates the quality of services, identifies strengths and needs of the service delivery system, provides relevant reports, and evaluates program improvement measures implemented
- Training
  1. The State is operating a staff development and training program that supports the goals and objectives in the CFSP, addresses services provided under titles IV-B and IV-E, and provides initial training for all staff who deliver these services
  2. The State provides for ongoing training for staff that addresses the skills and knowledge base needed to carry out their duties with regard to the services included in the CFSP
  3. The State provides training for current or prospective foster parents, adoptive parents, and staff of State licensed or approved facilities that care for children receiving foster care or adoption assistance under title IV-E that addresses the skills and knowledge base needed to carry out their duties with regard to foster and adopted children
- Service Array
  1. The State has in place an array of services that assess the strengths and needs of children and families and determine other service needs, address the needs of families in addition to individual children in order to create a safe home environment, enable children to remain safely with their parents when reasonable, and help children in foster and adoptive placements achieve permanency
  2. The services in the previous item are accessible to families and children in all political jurisdictions covered in the State's CFSP
  - The services in the first item can be individualized to meet the unique needs of children and families served by the agency
- Agency Responsiveness to the Community
  1. In implementing the provisions of the CFSP, the State engages in ongoing consultation with tribal representatives, consumers, service providers, foster care providers, the juvenile court, and other public and private child- and family-serving agencies and includes the major concerns of these representatives in the goals and objectives of the CFSP
  2. The agency develops, in consultation with these representatives, annual reports of progress and services delivered
  3. The State's services under the CFSP are coordinated with services or benefits of other Federal or federally assisted programs serving the same population
- Foster and Adoptive Parent Licensing, Recruitment and Retention
  1. The State has implemented standards for foster family homes and childcare institutions, which are reasonably in accord with recommended national standards
  2. The standards are applied to all licensed or approved foster family homes or child care institutions receiving title IV-E or IV-B funds
  3. The State complies with Federal requirements for criminal background clearances as related to licensing or approving foster care and adoptive placements and has in place a case planning process that includes provisions for addressing the safety of foster care and adoptive placements for children
  4. The State has in place a process for ensuring the diligent recruitment of potential foster and adoptive families that reflect the ethnic and racial diversity of the children in the State for whom foster and adoptive homes are needed
  5. The State has in place a process for the effective use of cross-jurisdictional resources to facilitate timely adoptive or permanent placements for waiting children

== History ==
Child and Family Services Reviews were effective starting in March 2000 after having been proposed in July 1998 and finally approved in September 1999.
