= National Baby Week =

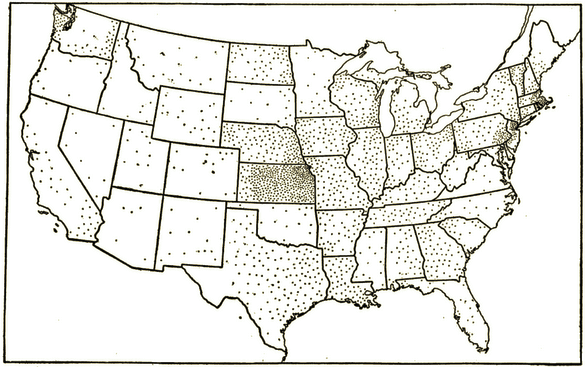
Approximate sitatuion of communities which took part in the National Baby Week campaign, 1916.

National Baby Week was an event first observed in the United States in March 1916, at the joint suggestion of the United States Children's Bureau and the General Federation of Women's Clubs. The purpose was to stimulate interest in the proper care of infants and by means of exhibits and conferences, to bring to the attention of parents the standards of infant welfare which had been developed by experts who had studied the subject. In order to promote the success of this work, the Bureau prepared a pamphlet entitled Baby Week Campaigns, describing the methods used in the earlier urban baby-week observances whose success had encouraged the belief that a nationwide observance would be practicable. This pamphlet was revised to include the best original ideas and devices developed during the campaign of 1916, in which 2083 communities participated. A similar movement was carried on in 1917. The work begun in these campaigns was developed even more extensively in 1918 in connection with Children's Year activities.

== Early history (1914) ==
Baby week was inaugurated by Chicago in 1914, and a second baby week was celebrated by New York City in June of the same year. Following their lead, Pittsburgh, Indianapolis, Topeka, Grand Rapids, and a few other cities held similar celebrations, consisting of a week dedicated to the welfare of babies. Lectures, exhibits, baby-health conferences and contests, school programs, parades, plays, the distribution of pamphlets, leaflets, and other printed matter on the care of the baby, newspaper publicity, and other expedients were used to concentrate attention for seven days on the baby's needs, with an emphasis calculated to inspire a popular response and result in permanent work for the reduction of infant mortality and for improvement in conditions affecting the welfare of babies and young children.

== Preparations (1915) ==
In the fall of 1915, the General Federation of Women's Clubs and the Children's Bureau announced their purpose to cooperate in promoting a nationwide baby week to be held in the spring of 1916. March 4 to 11 was suggested as the date, but it was made plain that a baby week at any other period would be regarded as part of the nationwide campaign.

The President and the Secretary of Labor gave public endorsement to the plan; many governors and mayors issued proclamations on the subject.

The General Federation of Women's Clubs and the Children's Bureau urged all appropriate national, State, and local organizations and all individuals interested in infant welfare to participate. From the general federation the message was carried to the officers of the State federations. Through the General Federation of Women's Clubs Magazine, through the publicity department of the federation, through press material issued by the Children's Bureau, and through the active interest of numerous periodicals and news bureaus the baby-week idea not only reached the more than 2,000,000 women identified with the general and State federations of women's clubs but received wide publicity throughout the country.

Interest in the movement led the United States Reclamation Service to devote a generous amount of space in one issue of the Reclamation Record to an appeal to "project women" to respond to the call of the federation. The plans adapted themselves well to the policy of the Commissioner of Indian Affairs in urging employees in the Indian Service to use every occasion to work for the preservation of infant lives. The Public Health Service was one of the largest contributors of material on the care of the baby for distribution in communities in all parts of the country. The Office of Home Economics of the Department of Agriculture prepared a special bulletin on Food for Young Children, which was widely circulated. The National Congress of Mothers and Parent-Teacher Associations cooperated actively in State and local campaigns. Many other national organizations responded and took means to interest local branches. Secretaries and members of State boards or departments of health and State registrars of vital statistics approved the plan and took an active part in the campaign. Extension divisions of State universities and agricultural colleges gave great assistance. Child-welfare organizations, visiting-nurse associations, churches, schools, libraries, and other civic bodies, magazines and newspapers, department stores and other commercial organizations, and a score of other agencies helped.

== Celebration (1916) ==
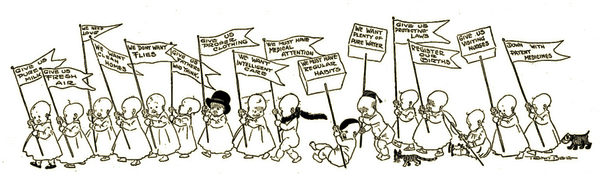
National Baby Week promotions

Campaigns were reported from every State. As a result of widespread cooperation, several thousand American cities, towns, and rural communities organized and celebrated baby weeks. The number of local campaigns held in the United States of which the Children's Bureau afterwards received authentic reports was 2,100. Requests for pamphlets and directions as to how to hold a baby week came to the bureau from 4,234 communities. Just what proportion of these inquiries actually resulted in celebrations can not be estimated. After baby week the bureau sent to each of the communities with which there had been correspondence a special request for a report on the local celebration. Less than onehalf of these replied, but these replies and authentic reports received from other sources gave the bureau a record of 2,100 celebrations. Indefinite reports, too vague to list, indicate that this number is far below the total. Of the 50 cities in the United States which are recorded in the census of 1910 as having a population of 100,000 or over, only 3 failed to report celebrations.

== Organization ==
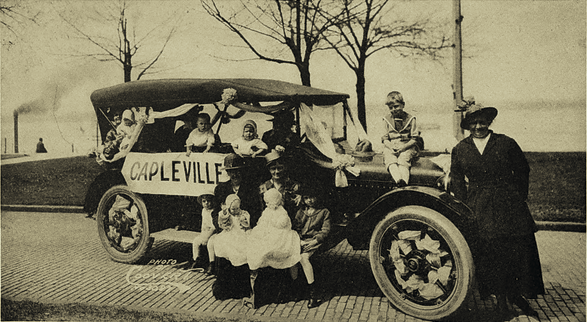
Campaign

The local initiative in organizing baby weeks usually came from the women's organizations, although where baby-saving societies were already well established these often took the first step. In one town that had no club nor organization whatsoever to initiate the campaign, a group of individuals simply came together and formed themselves into a committee. Occasionally, as has been said, it was one woman in a town who put through a program successfully. The importance of cooperation was generally recognized.

== Cost ==
Expenses varied all the way from about $4,000 spent by one middle western city to 35 cents spent by a southern village, $2 spent by a Pacific coast town, and nothing at all spent for a baby week which had an enthusiastic constituency from both city and country.

Many campaigns were paid for in part or altogether by public funds. In South Carolina the State board of health contributed $100 toward the campaign. The city of Los Angeles, Cal., subscribed $500 toward the expenses of its celebration, and the county of Los Angeles appropriated $1,000 more; private subscriptions brought the total a few dollars higher. In Sioux Falls, S. Dak., the city commissioners and county commissioners appropriated $200 toward the celebration, the remainder coming from club contributions and benefit performances. The San Francisco committee received $250 from the city. In Miami, Fla., the city council made a contribution, and in Salem, N. J., the city council gave $25. Elsewhere the local health department not uncommonly contributed service, material, or money to the campaign.

Some committees were so successful in raising money that after they had paid the expense of the celebration, they still had a good sum remaining with which to launch permanent work.

== Campaigns ==
Under some circumstances the county, or a section of the county, rather than the town proved the logical unit in working out the baby-week celebration. The great advantage of the county unit was that one exhibit served in rotation for a series of towns.

The State agencies most prominent in stimulating local communities to celebrate baby week were the State federations of women's clubs, the State boards or departments of health, and the extension divisions of State universities or agricultural colleges. Frequently, other State organizations threw their resources into the work. While there were many successful local campaigns in States where no Statewide plan was developed, the States where two or more agencies worked together and plans were well outlined some time in advance showed the largest numbers of uniformly good celebrations.

In many States, the governors issued proclamations.

== Program ==
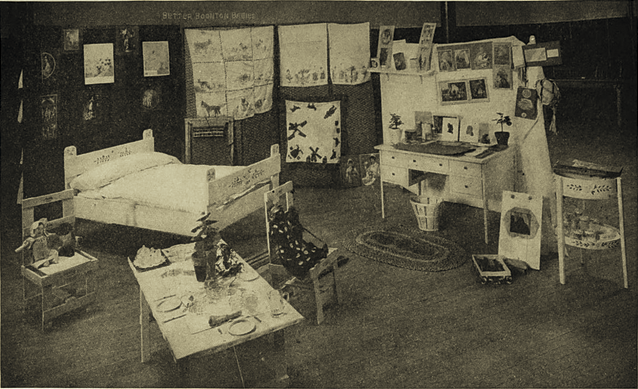
Exhibit

Some communities celebrated the whole week; in others baby week lasted one day or three or five days. The seven-day programs usually ran about as follows: Flag day, Baby Sunday, school day, fathers' day, outing day, visiting day, and birth-registration day. Baby Sabbath was also celebrated in many cities. This general program was varied in some towns by a tag day; one featured a rural mothers' day, one a merchants' baby booster day, one a recognition day (when business houses put out flags and everyone interested was asked to wear a flower), and one had a baby button day. In North Dakota the general plan was to call flag day advertising day, and concentrate that day on letting everybody know what was coming. The program of a middle western city was: Baby Sunday, daddy's day, mother's day, the baby's day, home day, welfare day, parade day.

Exhibits on the care of the baby frequently included demonstrations. Posters in foreign languages, illustrated with brightly colored photographs, were used to teach simple facts in baby hygiene and care.
