= Sheppard–Towner Act =

1921 US law regarding maternity and child care

Sheppard-Towner Act
- Long title: An Act for the promotion of the welfare and hygiene of maternity and infancy, and for other purposes.
- Enacted by: the 67th United States Congress
- Effective: November 23, 1921

Citations
- Public law: Pub. L. 67–97
- Statutes at Large: 42 Stat. 224, Chap: 135

Legislative history
- Signed into law by President Warren G. Harding on November 23, 1921

United States Supreme Court cases
- Massachusetts v. Mellon

The Promotion of the Welfare and Hygiene of Maternity and Infancy Act, more commonly known as the Sheppard–Towner Act and Maternity and Infancy Act, was a 1921 U.S. Act of Congress that provided federal funding for maternity and childcare. It was sponsored by Senator Morris Sheppard (D) of Texas and Representative Horace Mann Towner (R) of Iowa and signed by President Warren G. Harding on November 23, 1921. It went out of effect in 1929.

The Sheppard–Towner Act was the first venture of the federal government into social security legislation and the first major legislation that came to exist after the full enfranchisement of women. This marked the political and economic power of women's issues since the bill was passed due to the organization and influence of the Children's Bureau and the newly formed Women's Joint Congressional Committee. Before its passage, most of the expansion in public health programs occurred at the state and local levels. The act played an important role in the medicalization of pregnancy and childbirth, the decrease in infant mortality rates, and the expansion of federal welfare legislation in the twentieth century United States.

== Background ==
The political and social organization and activism by women in the Progressive Era led to the establishment of the United States Children's Bureau in the Department of Labor. The bureau was staffed and run largely by white women professionals with backgrounds in medicine, social science, and the settlement movement. Reports from the Children's Bureau indicated that 80% of all expectant mothers did not receive any advice or trained care. The Bureau also investigated high rates of infant and maternal mortality rates. After examining 23,000 infants, they concluded that the infant mortality rate was 111.2 deaths per 1000 live births, which was higher than most other industrialized countries.

The research by the Children's Bureau asserted that many infant deaths were preventable and attributed them to the lack of infant care knowledge. Women in rural areas, for example, had limited access to medical care and professional treatment. Less than half the women in a rural area in Wisconsin were attended to by doctors, and even then, the doctors sometimes arrived post-birth to cut the cord. The study also found a correlation between poverty and mortality rate. If a family earned less than $450 annually, one in six babies died within the first year; between $640 and $850, one in ten; over $1250, one in sixteen.

The Children's Bureau allied with other women's groups like the Women's Joint Congressional Committee in the wake of the passage of the Nineteenth Amendment to advocate for an act to improve medical care for women and children. Their advocacy constitutes an example of maternalist reform on a federal level.

== Passage ==
Representative Horace Mann Towner (R-Iowa) and Senator Morris Sheppard (D-Texas) introduced the bill in 1920. It was modeled after a similar bill presented in the previous session by Representative Jeannette Pickering Rankin (R-Montana) and sponsored by Julia Lathrop, head of the Children's Bureau. The Senate passed the bill in December 1920 after debates about funding and administration. The House did not vote on the bill since the hearings were held at the end of December. Opposition to the bill included the anti-suffragist Women Patriot Corporation and the American Medical Association, who feared that government intervention would lead to non-medical provisions of medical services. However, the opposition was yet not as organized as the Women's Joint Congressional Committee, Children's Bureau, and other allies. President Harding endorsed the bill in April 1921 and it was reintroduced to congress. The House passed the bill 279 to 39, and the Senate passed it 63 to 7.

== Provisions ==
The act provided a guide to the instruction of hygiene of maternity and infancy care through: 1) public health nurses, visiting nurses, consultation centers, and childcare conferences; 2) the distribution of educational materials on prenatal care, and 3) the regulation and licensure of midwives. Appropriation of $1,480,000 for fiscal year 1921–1922 and $1,240,000 for the next five years ending on June 30, 1927, were made for the act. Of the funds, $5000 would go to each state with a dollar for dollar matching up to an explicit cap determined by the state's population. Costs of administering the program would not exceed $50,000. The program was administered by Children's Bureau, though the states could decide how to utilize the money themselves.

== Impact ==
The Sheppard–Towner Act led to the creation of 3,000 child and maternal health care centers, many of these in rural areas, during the eight years it was in effect.

=== State involvement ===
The Children's Bureau worked extensively with state-level departments of health to advise them on how to use Sheppard-Towner funding. Participation in the program varied. States that had recently extended suffrage to women, such as North Carolina, Pennsylvania, or Alabama, tended to have higher participation levels in an effort to appeal to newly enfranchised voters. States with a longer history of women's suffrage tended to be less involved in the program, including Idaho, Colorado, and Washington. Massachusetts, Connecticut and Illinois never participated in the program.

=== Midwifery ===
At the time of the passage of the Sheppard–Towner Act, nearly half of all births in the United States were attended by midwives or other lay caretakers. The percentage was higher in the South, especially among African Americans. The Sheppard–Towner Act provided for training and licensure of midwives in an effort to decrease infant mortality, although the higher numbers of infant deaths in black and Hispanic communities were often caused by the effects of poverty rather than by the work of midwives. Public health workers' emphasis on pregnancy and childbirth as a medical process often led them to dismiss the folk traditions and knowledge of midwives, especially among African Americans in the South. This shift was a necessary step in improving maternal and infant health, as many of these folk traditions were rooted in unscientific and ineffective practices that posed risks to both mothers and newborns. Midwife licensure and associated Sheppard-Towner programs that encouraged reliance on medical professionals contributed to a significant–but not complete–decline in the practice of midwifery in the United States. By 1930, midwife-attended childbirths dropped to 15% nationwide, while African-Americans in the South continued to rely heavily on midwives well into the mid-twentieth century.

=== Infant mortality ===
The overall U.S. infant mortality rate in 1922 was 76.2 deaths per 1000 live births. By the time that Sheppard-Towner was repealed in 1929, the infant mortality rate had fallen to 67.6, with a net decrease of 9.6 deaths per 1000 live births. There was already a downward trend in infant mortality during the 1920s; not all of the decrease was due to Sheppard-Towner.

States that spent one standard deviation of money on "child-life", or approximately $27, reduced infant mortality on average by 2.8 deaths per 1000 live births. States that spent one standard deviation of money on health and sanitation, or approximately $188, reduced infant mortality on average by 6.27 deaths per 1000 live births. Home nurse visits reduced infant mortality on average by 1.8 deaths per 1000 live births. One standard deviation increase of the number of health centers decreased infant mortality on average by 2.25 deaths per 1000 people. An increase in 30 "prenatal letters", letters that provided information on prenatal and well-child care, decreased infant mortality on average by 0.2 deaths per 1000 live births.

There were different effects on white and non-white populations of states that decided to participate in Sheppard-Towner. For whites, one standard deviation of spending on child life reduced 1.5 deaths per 1000 live births, and one standard deviation of spending on health and sanitation reduced infant mortality by 3.8 deaths per 1000 live births while for non-whites both had no statistically significant effect on reductions. Nursing visits reduced white infant mortality by 1.2 deaths per 1000 live births while non-whites with the same nursing visits had 8.7 decrease in infant mortality. With the health centers that were constructed, 1.9 deaths per 1000 live births were reduced for white infant mortality and 8.4 deaths per 1000 live births were reduced for non-white infant mortality. Finally for prenatal letters, white infant mortality was reduced by 0.2 deaths per 1000 live births and non-white infant mortality reduction was not statistically significant.

Overall mortality rate would have been 0.7 and 1.9 deaths per 1000 births higher without Sheppard-Towner. That would make up 9 and 21 percent of the decline of infant mortality during the enactment of the act. Aggregate effect of Sheppard-Towner was driven primarily by the non-white populations. White infant mortality rate would have been 0.15 to 1.0 deaths higher whereas non-white rate would have been 9.9 to 13 deaths higher.

Federal appropriation for Sheppard-Towner was $776,676.54, suggesting that one infant death could be prevented for between $118 and $512 in federal expenditures.

== Opposition and end of the act ==
Cases brought to the Supreme Court claiming the act was unconstitutional were dismissed in 1923. The act was due for renewal in 1926, but was met with more vocal, organized opposition than in 1921. The American Medical Association saw the act as a socialist threat to its professional autonomy and increased their lobbying efforts, despite the Pediatric Section of the AMA House of Delegates' endorsement of the act's renewal. The rebuking of the Pediatric Section by the full House of Delegates led to the members of the Pediatric Section establishing the American Academy of Pediatrics. In the Journal of the American Medical Association, members of the AMA also critiqued the role of lay women administrators in the Children's Bureau, arguing that the administration of mother and infant health policy should take place under the medical, predominantly male, leadership of the Public Health Service.

Other opponents included the National Society of the Daughters of the American Revolution, which had supported the act in 1921, and the anti-suffragist Woman Patriot Publishing Company (formerly Woman Patriot Corporation), who accused the Sheppard-Towner bill of being a communist plot. In January 1927, a group of senators initiated a filibuster on the act, with Utah Senator William H. King arguing that the bill was championed by "neurotic women,...social workers who obtained pathological satisfaction in interfering with the affairs of other people,...and Bolsheviks who did not care for the family and its perpetuity."

As a compromise, the Sheppard–Towner Act was extended for another two years and expired on June 30, 1929. Women's groups unsuccessfully continued to organize and revive the act in the following years. Sheppard-Towner set the framework for the inclusion of substantial provisions for maternal and infant care in the Social Security Act of 1935.

According to a 2021 study, the inability of the Sheppard–Towner Act to collect data from the states on the administration of the program contributed to its defeat. The legacy of the program in the long-term was that administrators sought greater federal oversight over Title V of the Social Security Act, having learned the lessons of the Sheppard–Towner Act.

== See also ==
- History of childhood in the United States
