= Maternalist reform =

Early 20th century state assistance to mothers in the U.S.

Maternalist Reforms in the United States were a series of progressive social reform laws passed beginning in the late 19th and early 20th centuries, focused on providing state assistance to mothers with young children lacking the financial support of a male member of the household. This assistance took several forms, including mothers’ pensions and limits on the maximum working hours for women. Female activists were the primary advocates for these reforms, which reflected a maternalist ideology that “exalted women’s capacities to mother and extended to society as a whole the values of care, nurturance, and morality” and held that the government had an obligation and an interest in protecting and improving the living standards of women and children.

== History ==
=== Emergence ===
Maternal public policy emerged in the United States towards the end of the nineteenth-century, with scholars such as Kathryn Kish Sklar attributing this to failures within the male-dominated political sphere to remedy contemporary social ills creating “an urgent public demand for the skills of white, middle-class women possessed and the agendas they represented.” Sklar specifically notes “the arrival of hundreds of “new” immigrants from southern and eastern Europe, the intensification of industrial growth, and the explosive expansion of urban areas” as general trends within American society that contributed to the growth of the maternalist movement.

An early success for reformers was the landmark United States Supreme Court decision Muller v. Oregon, 208 U.S. 412 (1908), which upheld the constitutionality of a law that limited the maximum working hours of women. This ruling qualified the previous Lochner v. New York, 198 U.S. 45 (1905), which held that setting maximum working hours for men was unconstitutional, by ruling that the state was allowed to intervene in matters related to women's working hours due to "the difference between the sexes". The decision in Muller was based on a scientific and sociological study that demonstrated that the government has a legitimate interest in the working conditions of women due to their unique ability to bear children.

Maternalist precepts would continue to shape American welfare policies thereafter and came to succeed in three overlapping categories: child protection, social housekeeping, and maternal and child welfare. Maternalist reformers viewed women as "social mothers" who were called to clean up political corruption and aggressively pushed to enshrine maternalist policies in law, usually with provisions for female administrators. These reformers also worked to achieve civil service reform and were involved in promoting food and drug policies. By drawing from the association to motherhood—that mothers were responsible for protecting citizens within the home—the reformers made political demands with great efficacy.

=== Successes and criticisms ===
Maternalist reforms came during a time in American history where there was strong resistance to large-scale social provision policies as a result of the pension system for Civil War veterans ballooning “to such outsized proportions” that many were unwilling to engage in “further experiments with government benefits.” Despite this barrier, Progressive Era maternalist reformers had several successful initiatives such as those that helped establish the federal Children's Bureau (1912), pass the Sheppard-Towner Infancy and Maternity Protection Act (1921), and expand mothers' pensions to most states.

Maternalist reforms won protection for working people during a time in which labor movements made few gains and asserted the right of women to participate in the public realm, but also perpetuated ideas harmful to the advancement of women to a point of equality with men, eliciting criticism from growing numbers of feminists during the period. Among these ideas were the belief that all women ought to be mothers and that ideally men should be financially supporting the family.

There were also strong pushbacks to maternalist reform in the United States. The most significant of these came from opponents who attacked it as living proof of a socialist infiltration of the U.S. government. These attacks were effective in undermining some previous successes, such as the repeal of the Sheppard-Towner Infancy and Maternity Protection Act as well as the prevention of the addition of universal health coverage into the New Deal.

=== Legacy ===
Maternalist reform began to be employed as an analytical tool to explain the modern welfare states in the United States and Western Europe in the early 1990s. This was facilitated by a Koven and Michel article, which compared the maternal welfare provisions in the U.S., United Kingdom, Germany, and France, effectively introducing maternalism to welfare scholarship. Later scholarship tackling the same subject revealed that paternalist welfare policies, which were designed by male bureaucrats to benefit male workers and their dependents, prevailed in England, whereas the maternalist welfare policies initiated by female reformers to address the specific plights of women thrived in the United States.

== Individuals and organizations ==
Individual reformers who were advocates of maternalist policies include:

- Ellen Gates Starr
- Florence Kelley, founder of the National Consumers League and factory inspector, called on middle-class women to boycott products made by women and children in sweatshops.
- Jane Addams
- Josephine Clara Goldmark
- Julia Lathrop
- Lillian Wald
- Sophonisba Breckinridge

Organizations and institutions that supported maternalist reforms:

- General Federation of Women's Clubs
- Hull House
- National Consumers League
- United States Children's Bureau

== See also ==
- History of public health in the United States
