= Child Welfare Information Gateway =

The Child Welfare Information Gateway is the congressionally mandated and funded information service of the United States Children's Bureau, Administration for Children and Families, United States Department of Health and Human Services. It was established in 2006 to replace the National Clearinghouse on Child Abuse and Neglect Information and the National Adoption Information Clearinghouse. The Child Welfare Information Gateway covers child-welfare topics, including family-centered practice, child abuse and neglect, abuse and neglect prevention, child protection, family preservation and support, foster care, achieving and maintaining permanency, adoption, management of child welfare agencies and related topics such as child and family assessment, laws and policies, statistics and coincident family issues (e.g., domestic violence and substance abuse). Its website links to sources of print and electronic publications, websites, databases and online learning tools on these topics.

== History ==
Prior to the creation of Child Welfare Information Gateway, the Children's Bureau operated two separate, federally mandated clearinghouses, each representing different aspects of the child welfare system.

The National Clearinghouse on Child Abuse and Neglect Information was established in 1974 by the Child Abuse Prevention and Treatment Act (Public Law 93-247) to collect, organize, and disseminate information about all aspects of child maltreatment. The National Adoption Information Clearinghouse was established by the United States Congress in the Consolidated Omnibus Budget Reconciliation Act of 1986 to provide free information on all aspects of adoption.

In the early days of these federal clearinghouses, services consisted primarily of gathering print resources in a central library located in Northern Virginia. Responses to child welfare-related inquiries were provided via telephone, and publications were mailed via the postal service upon request. Early compendiums of national adoption resources and state child welfare laws were collected in binders.

More recently, the clearinghouses and now Information Gateway have increasingly used electronic databases and the Internet to provide services, including access to electronic copies of publications; searchable databases of state statutes, foster care organizations, and adoption resources; and interactive online learning tools.

== Significant publications ==
A list of publications offered by Child Welfare Information Gateway can be found in its Publications Catalog in English or Spanish. Some of the titles available include:

- How the Child Welfare System Works
- Major Federal Legislation Concerned With Child Protection, Child Welfare, and Adoption
- How Many Children Were Adopted in 2007 and 2008?
- Preventing Child Maltreatment and Promoting Well-Being: A Network for Action 2013 Resource Guide

== See also ==
- United States Children's Bureau
- Administration for Children and Families
- Child abuse
- Foster care in the United States
- Adoption in the United States
