= Jerry Milner =

American government employee

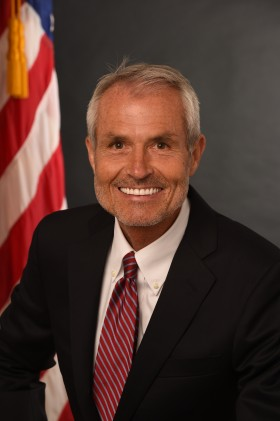

Acting Commissioner of the Administration for Children and Families
- Incumbent
- Assumed office June 5, 2017
- President: Donald Trump

Personal details
- Education: Auburn University (BA); University of Alabama (MSW)

Jerry Milner is an American social worker and civil servant. He worked as acting Commissioner for the Administration for Children and Families, a division of the United States Department of Health and Human Services, between 2017 and 2021. In that role he had responsibility for the Family and Youth Services Bureau and United States Children's Bureau. He is now (as at February 2024) Co-director of the Family Justice Group

== Education ==
Milner graduated from Reeltown High School in Reeltown, Alabama. He received a bachelor's degree in political science from Auburn University, and received graduate degrees in social work from the University of Alabama.

== Career ==
Milner previously served as the Vice President for Child Welfare Practice at the Center for the Support of Families and state child welfare director for the Alabama Department of Human Resources. He was appointed to his role within the Trump administration in June 2017.

Milner served in the United States Children's Bureau during the Bush administration.
