= Planning and Learning Technologies =

Planning and Learning Technologies (Pal-tech), Inc., is a private government contracting company based in northern Virginia.

The company was founded in 1987. Since that time, they have provided an array of training, management, and administrative services to multiple departments, agencies, and offices, including: Department of Commerce; Department of Defense, Civilian Personnel Management Service; Department of Education; Department of Energy; Department of Health and Human Services, Administration for Children and Families; Department of Health and Human Services, HHS University; Department of Health and Human Services, Office of the Assistant Secretary for Planning and Evaluation; United States Department of Labor; Department of State, Foreign Service Institute; Federal Deposit Insurance Corporation; Federal Emergency Management Agency; National Oceanic and Atmospheric Administration; Office of Personnel Management; Social Security Administration; US Agency for International Development; US Army, Training and Doctrine Command; US Coast Guard; US Navy, Naval AIR Systems Command.

Pal-tech houses the Office of Head Start Resource Center (HSRC), a national center that supports the Office of Head Start (OHS) and Head Start children and families.
