= David Hansell =

American lawyer

David A. Hansell is an American advocate and expert on public policy and programs that provide assistance to vulnerable populations. He started his career in public service in the late 1980s as an advocate for New York City's HIV-positive population. He then joined the City government, where he was quickly recognized for his talent for modernizing government programs, and developing innovative methods for creating economic opportunities and sustainable supports for poor and working-class families.

In time, this led to Hansell's supervising social service and economic support programs in the State of New York. He then became Federal administrator of the agency whose responsibilities include the U.S. Welfare-to-Work Program, known as Temporary Assistance for Needy Families (TANF).

== Early life, education, and early career ==
Hansell is a native of Cleveland, Ohio. He earned a B.A. in Psychology from Haverford College, followed by a J.D. from Yale Law School.

He started his professional career as an aide to U.S. Senator Donald Riegle, Jr. (D-Michigan), then as an aide to U.S. Senator Carl Levin (D-Michigan).

In the late 1980s, Hansell joined New York City's Gay Men's Health Crisis (GMHC). As the director of legal services, then later as deputy executive director for government and public affairs, he worked on policy and legislation critical to the rights, health, and well-being of people who tested positive for HIV. This included a law to prohibit health insurers from denying insurance coverage to people who tested positive for HIV, or forcing those seeking insurance to take an HIV test. Other notable legislation included a law requiring the State of New York to pay the health insurance premiums of people with HIV.

== City of New York ==
In 1997, Hansell joined the New York City Health Department as Associate Commissioner for HIV Services, then later became Associate Commissioner in Planning and Program Implementation.

In 2002, he moved over to the New York City Human Resources Administration (HRA) as chief of staff. HRA is the largest municipal social services agency in the U.S. It serves approximately three million clients directly across its multiple programs and is the local administrator of the TANF program.

When Hansell was chief of staff, HRA implemented significant “second generation” reforms to improve delivery of services. These included “VendorStat,” a vendor quality control program for job training as well as other contracts; and WeCare, a program providing clients with medical and/or mental health barriers with customized services so that they can get and keep jobs and become self-sufficient.

In February 2017, Mayor Bill de Blasio named Hansell as the Commissioner of the Administration for Children's Services to replace Gladys Carrion, who had recently resigned.

As ACS Commissioner, Hansell has worked to improve the overall agency by hiring at least 600 new child protective workers, reducing the caseload from 14.8 in May 2017 down to 12 as of February 2018. Commissioner Hansell also increased the number of Investigative Consultants on staff by 28%. Moreover, under his leadership, ACS provided tablets to over 2,000 field employees so they can be more efficient out in the field rather than having to return to a computer.

Commissioner Hansell also created a new division at ACS, the Division of Child and Family Well-Being, making NYC ACS the first child welfare agency in the country to spearhead a new “primary prevention” approach, which seeks to reach families proactively with services and resources that can support healthy children, families and communities.

After leaving ACS in 2021, Hansell joined Casey Family Programs, the nation’s largest operating foundation dedicated to reducing the need for foster care, as Senior Advisor for Child Welfare Policy. In that capacity, he works with federal, state and local child welfare leadership to improve services to children and families.

== State of New York ==
Governor Eliot Spitzer named Hansell commissioner of the Office of Temporary and Disability Assistance (OTDA) in 2007, putting him in charge of the second largest state TANF program in the United States. OTDA also supervises economic support programs, including food stamps, for poor and working class individuals and families in New York's sixty-two counties

Based on his experiences in the city, Hansell initiated a range of innovative employment-focused programs. These included a transitional jobs program, career pathways program, and WorkPays New York. WorkPays enlists employers as access points for enrolling low-wage workers in benefit programs. Hansell also launched New York State’s first Internet portal for clients to apply for multiple government benefit programs: myBenefits.

After running two of the largest local and state TANF programs in the United States, Hansell joined the administration of President Barack Obama. The U.S. Department of Health and Human Services (HHS), Administration for Children and Families (ACF) administers and funds a broad range of social and economic support programs for vulnerable individuals, children, and families, focusing on early childhood development, child welfare, income support, workforce engagement, and economic development. As acting Assistant Secretary, Hansell applied resources from the American Recovery and Reinvestment Act (ARRA) TANF Emergency Contingency Fund to subsidize the creation of more than 250,000 jobs for low-income parents and youth across the U.S. during the Great Recession.

From 2012 to 2015, Hansel served as head of KPMG’s Global Human and Social Services Center of Excellence.
