= Julia Lathrop =

American social reformer (1858–1932)

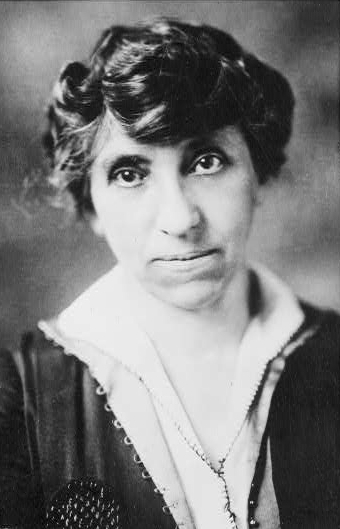
- Lathrop, 1900–1920

1st Director of United States Children's Bureau
- In office 1912–1921
- President: William Howard Taft, Woodrow Wilson
- Succeeded by: Grace Abbott

Personal details
- Born: Julia Clifford Lathrop; June 29, 1858 Rockford, Illinois, U.S.
- Died: April 15, 1932 (aged 73) Rockford, Illinois, U.S.
- Resting place: Greenwood Cemetery, Rockford, Illinois
- Party: Republican
- Parent(s): William Lathrop and Adeline Potter
- Education: Miss Porter's School; Rockford Female Seminary; Vassar College
- Profession: American social and political activist

Julia Clifford Lathrop (June 29, 1858 – April 15, 1932) was an American social reformer in the area of education, social policy, and children's welfare. As director of the United States Children's Bureau from 1912 to 1922, she was the first woman ever to head a United States federal bureau.

== Biography ==
Julia Clifford Lathrop was born in Rockford, Illinois. Julia's father William Lathrop, a lawyer and personal friend of Abraham Lincoln, helped establish the Republican Party and served in the state legislature (1856–57) and Congress (1877–1879). Her mother was a suffragist active in women's rights activities in Rockford and a graduate of the first class of Rockford Female Seminary.

Lathrop attended Rockford Female Seminary where she met Jane Addams and Ellen Gates Starr. After one year, she transferred to Vassar College, developing her own multidisciplinary studies in statistics, institutional history, sociology, and community organization and graduated in 1880. Afterwards, she worked in her father's law office first as a secretary and then studying the law for herself.

=== Work in Chicago ===
In 1890, Lathrop moved to Chicago where she joined Jane Addams, Ellen Gates Starr, Alzina Stevens, Edith Abbott, Grace Abbott, Florence Kelley, Mary McDowell, Alice Hamilton, Sophonisba Breckinridge and other social reformers at Hull House. Lathrop ran a discussion group called the Plato Club in the early days of the House. The women at Hull House actively campaigned to persuade Congress to pass legislation to protect children. During the depression years of the early 1890s Lathrop served as a volunteer investigator of relief applicants, visiting homes to document the needs of the families.

In 1893, Lathrop was appointed as the first ever woman member of the Illinois State Board of Charities, beginning her lifelong work in civil service reform: advocating for the training of professional social workers and standardizing employment procedures. This would lead to opening the labor market for educated women as well as improving social services in Progressive Era cities and towns. Over the next few years she helped introduce reforms such as the appointment of female doctors in state hospitals and the removal of the insane from the state workhouses.

=== Director of United States Children's Bureau ===
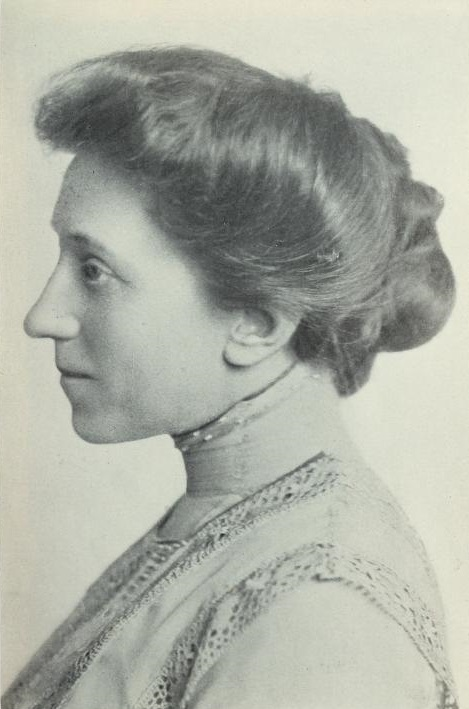
"Miss Julia C. Lathrop", The World's Work, 1912.

Reacting to pressure from Progressive women reformers for the appointment of a woman for the newly created Children's Bureau, in 1912, President William Taft appointed Lathrop as the first bureau chief. Over the next nine years Lathrop directed research into child labor, infant mortality, maternal mortality, juvenile delinquency, mothers' pensions and illegitimacy.

The Children's Bureau under Lathrop (1912–1921; known as "America's First Official Mother") and her successors became an administrative unit that not only created child welfare policy but also led its implementation. For reform-minded women, the Bureau's focus on maternal and child welfare gave them a role in politics for the first time—something that the suffrage or women's rights movements had not offered them. The Bureau expanded its budget and personnel to focus on a scientific approach to motherhood in order to reduce infant and maternal mortality, improve child health and advocate for trained care for children with disabilities. Lathrop modeled the Children's Bureau investigations from the work she did while at Hull-House. The Bureau also lobbied to abolish child labor. Scientific language became critical to the reform efforts such as the baby-saving campaigns in towns with large working class and immigrant populations where the middle class maternalists battled contemporary beliefs in the inevitability of high infant mortality rates. "Mother-work in the community" meant that women educated in the latest scientific theories about children's health and safety would lead the movement for child welfare reform.

In her first annual report for the agency, Lathrop described the plans for expansion: promotion of birth registration, infant mortality field studies, production of instructional pamphlets and reports, expand the study of child labor laws, explore issues regarding mothers' pensions, and study the status of "dependent, defective, and delinquent children". Lathrop wrote in 1914: "Work for infant welfare is coming to be regarded as more than a philanthropy or an expression of good will. It is a profoundly important public concern which tests the public spirit and the democracy of a community."

Unlike the National Congress of Mothers, Lathrop's leadership of the Children's Bureau relied on her belief in the New Woman's right to freedom for individual development and opportunities, including a college degree of equal merit to men's and a decent job. However, Lathrop was careful to insist that motherhood was "the most important calling in the world" and to deny that women should have career ambitions. This way Lathrop could avoid controversy even while she built public support for the new agency.

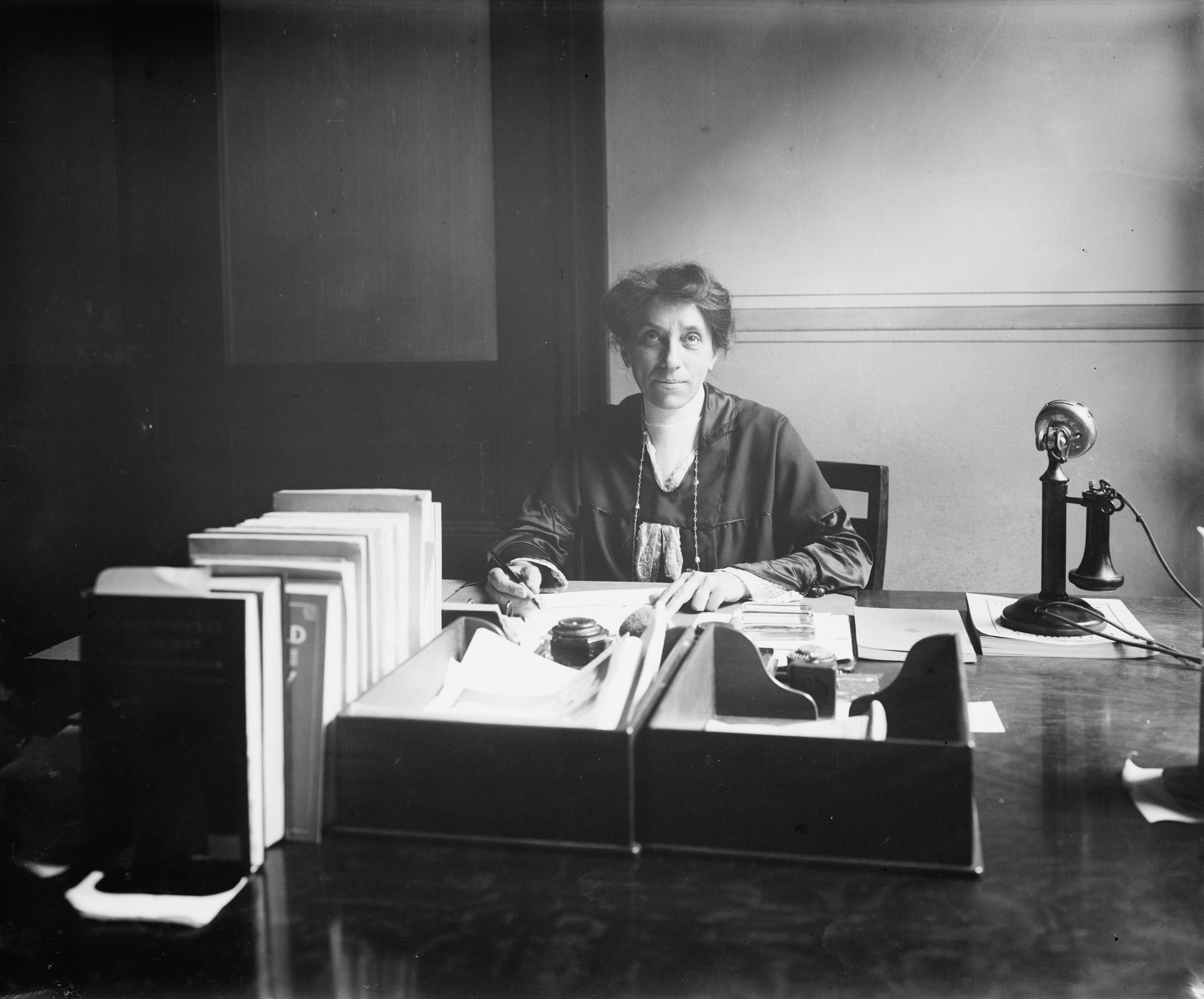
Julia Lathrop, Commissioner of the United States Children's Bureau

In 1917, the American Association for Labor Legislation proposed a national health insurance act that included a provision for weekly cash allocations for pregnant women. Lathrop went against the private insurance industry and the American Medical Association to support this proposal, believing that the maternity benefit systems already in place in Germany, England and France left too many women and their babies uninsured. Lathrop argued in an address before the American Public Health Association's 1918 meeting in Chicago that U.S. leaders needed to address the reasons for poverty in order to address children's health needs—that high infant mortality among the poor and working class in American cities was not just due to ignorance or laziness. Lathrop asked: "Which is the more safe and sane conclusion! That 88 per cent of all these fathers were incorrigibly indolent or below normal mentally, or that sound public economy demands an irreducible minimum living standard to be sustained by a minimum wage and other such expedients as may be developed in a determined effort to give every child a fair chance?"

The attitude of most of the staff in the Children's Bureau and other government agencies however, was that women—especially with children—should not work outside of the home even if impoverished. Any connections between children's health and such issues as expansion of workers' insurance, minimum wage or sanitation systems lost credence. The popular strategy remained focused on "Americanizing" immigrant workers and teaching white mothers how to take care of babies. The Bureau chose not to address the horrifyingly high mortality rates among babies in families of color. In the South, much of the public health campaigns were undertaken by African-American, Hispanic or black clubwomen working in their own segregated communities.

In 1921 the Sheppard-Towner Maternity and Infancy Act became the first federally funded social welfare measure in the United States. The law provided federal matching grants to the states for prenatal and child health clinics, visiting nurses for expectant and new mothers, distribution of information on nutrition and hygiene as well as midwife training. Contrary to Lathrop's original ideas, the final version of the law did not provide any financial aid or medical care.

The first 30 years of the twentieth century marked a transition between traditional social medicine that included the use of relatives or local midwives and the rise of a modern medical management of childbirth and childrearing by experts outside the family and home. However, as the federal bureaucracy blossomed in the years after World War II, the only agency focused solely on children lost its power and influence.

=== Juvenile Justice ===
As early as 1898, at the third Annual Illinois Conference on Charities, organized by the philanthropist Lucy Flower and Julia Lathrop, reformers called for a separate system of courts for children. Lathrop's experience at the Hull House and as a Charities Board member had given her firsthand knowledge of the conditions for children in county poorhouses and jails. Prior to the reform era, children over the age of seven were imprisoned with adults. Lathrop helped found the country's first juvenile court in 1899, and the Chicago Woman's Club established the Juvenile Court Committee (electing Lathrop as its first president in 1903) to pay the salaries of fifteen probation officers and run a detention home located at 625 West Adams Street.

By 1904, Julia Lathrop helped organize and then became the president of the Juvenile Psychopathic Institute. The director was psychologist William A. Healy who led scientific studies of the physical and mental health of the children, shifting away from the belief that environment alone was responsible for a child's delinquent behavior. Together with members of the National Congress of Mothers, Lathrop worked to organize a juvenile court movement nationally with justice law reformers such as Judge Ben Lindsey (who later chaired the National Conference of Charities and Correction's juvenile court subcommittee).

=== Later life ===
Julia Lathrop became a member of Alpha Kappa Alpha sorority. In 1918, President Woodrow Wilson sent Lathrop and Grace Abbott to represent the U.S. at an international conference on child welfare. There Lathrop consulted on the formation of a childcare bureau in the newly formed country of Czechoslovakia. After her retirement from the Children's Bureau in 1922, Lathrop became president of the Illinois League of Women Voters. She also helped form the National Committee of Mental Illness. In 1925 Lathrop represented the U.S. in Switzerland at the Child Welfare Committee established by the League of Nations.

== Honours ==
=== Academic ===
There is a residence hall at Rockford University and an elementary school in Rockford named after Lathrop. An intermediate school in Santa Ana, California also bears her name. Although a residence hall at Vassar College is named for Dr. Edward Lathrop, a charter trustee, he was not Julia's father. Julia's father was William Lathrop, a lawyer and (briefly) a congressman, from Rockford, Illinois. In 1938, the Chicago Housing Authority opened the Julia C. Lathrop Homes, a public housing project in the North Center neighborhood on Chicago's north side.

=== Foreign honours ===
- Czechoslovakia: Officer of the Order of the White Lion (1946)

== See also ==
- Euthenics

== Bibliography ==
- Addams, Jane (2004) [1935]. My Friend, Julia Lathrop. Urbana and Chicago: University of Illinois Press. ISBN 978-0-252-07168-3.
- Julia Lathrop Collection, Special Collections, University of Illinois at Chicago
- Stebner, Eleanor J. (1997). The Women of Hull House: A study in spirituality, vocation, and friendship. Albany, N.Y.: State University of New York Press. ISBN 978-0-7914-3488-8.

Government offices
Preceded by	Director of United States Children's Bureau; 1912–1921	Succeeded by Grace Abbott
