= Disease in colonial America =

Overview of diseases in colonial America

Disease in colonial America that afflicted the early immigrant settlers was a dangerous threat to life. Some of the diseases were new and treatments were ineffective. Malaria was deadly to many new arrivals, especially in the Southern colonies. Of newly arrived able-bodied young men, over one-fourth of the Anglican missionaries died within five years of their arrival in the Carolinas. Mortality was high for infants and small children, especially for diphtheria, smallpox, yellow fever, and malaria. Most sick people turned to local healers, and used folk remedies. Others relied upon the minister-physicians, barber-surgeons, apothecaries, midwives, and ministers; a few used colonial physicians trained either in Britain, or an apprenticeship in the colonies. One common treatment was blood letting. The method was crude due to a lack of knowledge about infection and disease among medical practitioners. There was little government control, regulation of medical care, or attention to public health. By the 18th century, Colonial physicians, following the models in England and Scotland, introduced modern medicine to the cities, and made some advances in vaccination, pathology, anatomy and pharmacology.

== Physicians ==
In Colonial America, local doctors, midwives, healers and even officials administered medical care to the residents in their village or town. In many colonies, there was no distinction between physicians and surgeons; though the distinction remained in New Netherland, where the professions were differentiated by their titles: Dokter and Meister. Generally, when an emergency occurred the person who was responsible for administering medical care was expected to handle all aspects of the problem. In most places, there were families in which the folk practice of medicine and knowledge of curative drugs was passed down through the generations. There were several noted physicians in Colonial America; The practice of the larger cities, especially Philadelphia, New York, Boston and Charleston. The first medical schools were founded late in the colonial era in Philadelphia and New York.

=== Thomas Thacher ===
Thomas Thacher was an outstanding Puritan preacher and physician of his time. After coming to America at fifteen, Thacher received his early education under pastor Charles Chauncy. Thacher's education was liberal; he learned elements of medicine. Thacher committed much of his time to the practice of medicine and was a prominent physician in Boston. Shortly before Thomas Thatcher's death in 1677, he wrote a short article on smallpox and measles. It was the first medical paper written that was published in America.

=== Giles Firmin ===
Giles Firmin was a deacon in Boston, who came to America from England in 1632. While practicing medicine in Ipswich, Massachusetts, Firmin became the first anatomical lecturer in America. Firmin gave detailed lectures about dried bones stimulating an interest of the General Court in 1647, which recommended that his anatomical lectures be given at least once every four years. Nevertheless, it was not followed and anatomy went untaught.

=== John Winthrop Jr. ===
John Winthrop Jr. was a physician who was in constant communication with England asking for advice on various medical topics and diseases. Winthrop realized the Colony needed trained doctors and received from a physician in England eight pages of notes on herbs and their uses in curing diseases in 1643. Through these notes, Winthrop used the knowledge to advise the people in the Colony. He was untrained in medicine and had little experience in making a diagnosis relying a great deal on the notes from England. Winthrop's recommendations were for various ointments, nauseous remedies, cupping, bandages and baths. His practice was later taken over by his son.

== Epidemics ==
Epidemics of many zoonotic diseases were reported during the colonial times—particularly smallpox. Malaria was endemic, and especially in the southern colonies everyone could be expected to become infected.

=== Yellow fever ===
Yellow fever was a disease that caused thousands of deaths, and many people to flee the afflicted areas. It begins with a headache, backache, and fever making the patient extremely sick from the start, and gets its name from the yellow color of the skin, which develops in the third day of the illness. At the end of one week, the affected person is either dead or recovering. Yellow Fever is transmitted by mosquitoes, when it bites an infected person it carries several thousand infective doses of the disease making it a carrier for life passing it from human to human.

Yellow Fever made its first appearance in America in 1668, in Philadelphia, New York and Boston in 1693. It had been brought over from Barbados. Throughout the Colonial period, there were several epidemics in those cities as well as Texas, New Hampshire, Florida and up the Mississippi River as far as St. Louis, Missouri. During many of these epidemics, the residents who chose to stay in the area avoided others by shutting themselves in their houses away from friends and jobs. Unemployment and businesses coming to a halt was universal. The death rate was so high the people had to work day and night to bury the dead.

=== Smallpox ===
Smallpox is caused by the variola virus and is extremely contagious, for it is spread by physical contact and affects children and adults alike. Smallpox was contagious, disfiguring, and often deadly. The epidemics of the disease were recurrent, devastating, and frequent.

A particularly virulent sequence of smallpox outbreaks took place in Boston, Massachusetts, where the most severe epidemic occurred. The entire population fled the city, bringing the virus to the rest of the Thirteen Colonies.

Colonists tried to prevent the spread of smallpox by isolation and inoculation. Inoculation caused a mild form of the disease; it was new to the country and very controversial because of the threat that the procedure itself could be fatal, or otherwise spread the disease. It was introduced by Zabdiel Boylston and Cotton Mather in Boston in 1721. The procedure involved injecting the infection into the patient, which resulted in a mild form of the disease. This led to a shorter period a person had Smallpox than if they had contracted naturally. Strong support for inoculation came the leading Puritan minister, Cotton Mather, who preached for inoculations during the 1721 smallpox epidemic in Boston. His advice was heeded primarily by well-educated wealthy Puritan families. The town of Cambridge and Harvard College combined broad-based inoculation programs with inspection and isolation efforts. They providing a model followed by other New England communities, which increasingly adopted the immunization and quarantine policies by 1800.

South Carolina resisted inoculation. James Kilpatrick, a British physician vigorously promoted vaccination in the mid-18th century, but failed to convince local medical and political leaders.

== Other colonial diseases ==
Although yellow fever and smallpox were two very destructive diseases that affected Colonial America, many other diseases affected the area during this time. During the early days of the colonial settlement, people brought with them contagious diseases. After the importation of African slaves, more serious parasitic diseases came to Colonial America.

=== Malaria ===
The cause of malaria was unknown until August 20, 1897. Colonial physicians attributed it to "miasma" or bad air. In reality this disease is a parasite that is found in certain species of mosquitoes, which bred more rapidly as virgin soil was broken in the Carolina lowlands for rice cultivation. The parasite found the slaves as a reservoir for the infection of the mosquito. The mosquito then transmitted the parasite to other slaves and the white population, causing rapid development of highly malarious communities. The disease spread across the South and Northwest. People who newly arrived from Europe were especially vulnerable to the deadly forms, but after the second generation, the colonists typically had non-fatal cases, characterized by a feverish season for a few weeks every year.

=== Hookworm infection ===
The hookworm infections were first seen in 1845 Florida and 1850 Louisiana. This disease is thought to have been introduced into Colonial America from the Eastern Hemisphere, caused by a tropical parasite that was distributed throughout the moist soils of the southwest, from a Virginia to Illinois and down the Gulf of Mexico toward Texas. The slaves were the carriers of the disease polluting the soil that they worked, depositing the parasitic eggs. As the eggs hatch, the parasite infects those near the soil where it lives.

=== Thiamine deficiency ===
Unlike some diseases, thiamine deficiency, or beriberi, is a treatable, preventable disease caused by the deficiency of vitamin B_{1}. First seen in 1642 by the Dutch physician Jacobus Bontius, it was named for the Sinhalese word meaning weakness-weakness. Beriberi is seen in two forms: wet and dry. When in the dry form the patient experience pains in their extremities, paresthesias, paralyses, and contractures due to being a paralytic type of disease. When beriberi is in its wet form the patient can expect swelling of the extremities and face along with an effusion of fluid into their joints, pleural cavity, and pericardial cavity. Beriberi in this form can lead to sudden death.

New England fishermen first discovered the disease in Colonial America in the 19th century. There have been accounts that beriberi was seen in Jamestown with people experiencing swellings and fluxes and high fevers as well as soldiers in the American Civil War who experienced the same symptoms as the disease beriberi.

=== Typhoid fever and dysentery ===
Acute bacillary dysentery has a shorter duration than typhoid fever but both cause bloody flux. These two diseases are deadly in their own right but when a person has both at the same time it is almost impossible to recover.

Typhoid fever causes a prolonged burning fever, is debilitating, and causes death more often than not. It occurs mostly in the hot months of the year but can flare up at any time. The first epidemic of the fever was located in Virginia by Reverend Robert Hunt after taking a voyage where typhoid fever transpired. Typhoid Fever was a huge component of military operations; because many soldiers would become afflicted with the disease the military had a shortage of men. More men died from typhoid fever than in action or from wounds.

== See also ==
- Colonial history of the United States
- History of medicine in the United States
