= Aid to Families with Dependent Children =

Federal assistance program in the U.S. from 1935 to 1997

Seal of the United States Department of Health and Human Services, which administered the Aid to Families with Dependent Children program

Aid to Families with Dependent Children (AFDC) was a federal assistance program in the United States in effect from 1935 to 1997, created by the Social Security Act (SSA) and administered by the United States Department of Health and Human Services that provided financial assistance to children whose families had low or no income.

The program grew from a minor part of the social security system to a significant system of welfare administered by the states with federal funding. However, it was criticized for offering incentives for women to have children, and for providing disincentives for women to join the workforce. In July 1997, AFDC was replaced by the more restrictive Temporary Assistance for Needy Families (TANF) program.

== History ==
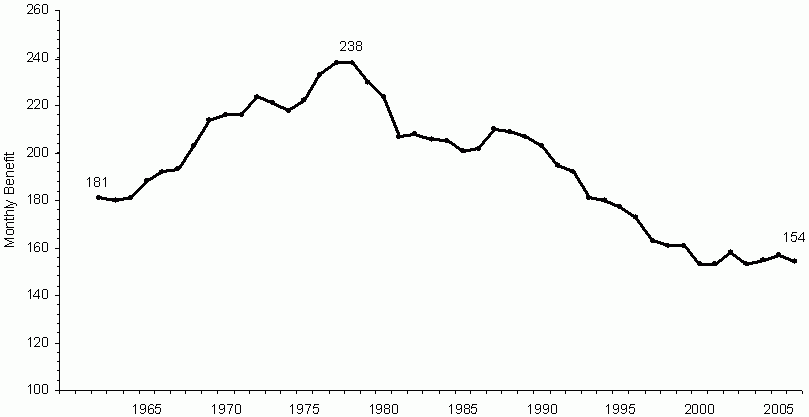
The overall decline in welfare monthly benefits (in 2006 dollars)

The program was passed on August 14, 1935 as part of the Social Security Act of 1935 during the New Deal reform era. It was created as a means tested entitlement which subsidized the income of families where fathers were "deceased, absent, or unable to work". Religious groups with interests in child welfare programs, led by the National Conference of Catholic Charities, were instrumental in lobbying for changes to the law that limited the scope of the ADC to dependent children who lived with their parents or relatives within the second degree of kinship. Within five years, the program grew to support more children than foster care and orphanages combined.

The federal government required contributions from individual states, and authorized state discretion to determine who received aid and in what amount. On average, the ADC provided a direct payment of $18 per month for one child, and $12 for a second child. In 1994, the average payment was $420/month. In 1961 a change in the law permitted states to extend benefits to families where the father was unemployed, a measure which 25 states eventually adopted. The words "families with" were added to the name in 1962, partly due to concern that the program's rules discouraged marriage.

The civil rights movement and the efforts of the National Welfare Rights Organization in the 1960s expanded the scope of welfare entitlements to include black women. The welfare rolls’ racial demographics changed drastically. The majority of welfare recipients still remained white and most black female recipients continued to work. Starting in 1962, the Department of Health and Human Services allowed state-specific exemptions as long as the change was "in the spirit of AFDC" in order to allow some experimentation. By 1996 spending was $24 billion per year. When adjusted for inflation, the highest spending was in 1976, which exceeded 1996 spending by about 8%. In 1967 the federal government began requiring states to establish the paternity of children eligible for the program, and extended benefits to "unemployed male parents with a work history".

=== Man-in-the-house rule ===
A number of states enacted so called "man-in-the-house" rules, which disqualified families if there was any adult male present in the household whatsoever. This was part of a broader attempt to discourage welfare dependency by the undeserving, in particular black families where the man didn't have work or where the woman had a relationship with men who didn't take care of the family.

The "man-in-the-house" rule was struck down in 1968 by the Supreme Court in King v. Smith. Thereafter, families with males in the household were eligible for benefits if they were not deemed to be actual or substitute parents, although any financial contribution on the part of the male to the family was still considered a part of the family's total income. By 1981, the Supreme Court went further and required that states take into consideration the income earned by step-fathers.

=== Thirty-and-a-third rule ===
AFDC caseload
Time period	Growth
1950–60	7%
1960–65	24%
1965–70	125%
1970–75	29%
1975–80	3%

The year 1967 saw the establishment of the thirty-and-a-third rule, which allowed families to keep their first $30 earned along with one third of their income following the first $30 without the change affecting their eligibility for benefits. This and other factors led to a large increase in enrollment. For example, caseloads rose 24% from 1960 to 1965, but rose 126% in the period from 1965 to 1970.

=== Califano v. Westcott ===
The Supreme Court ruled in Califano v. Westcott (1979) that two-parent families with an unemployed mother are entitled to Aid to Families with Dependent Children benefits.

== Criticism ==
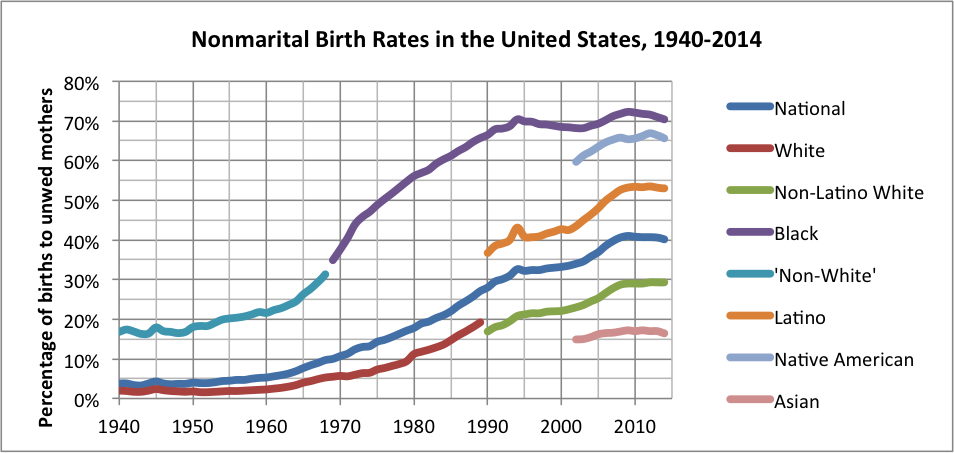
Nonmarital birth rates by race in the United States from 1940 to 2014. Data are from the National Vital Statistics System Reports published by the CDC National Center for Health Statistics. Note: Before 1969, the rates for all minority groups were consolidated in the category of "Non-White."

Early in the program, there were concerns about whether it encouraged unwed motherhood. Some advocates complained that the rule had the effect of breaking up marriages and promoting matriarchy: (Note: see also single-parent family)

[T]he AFDC program tended to treat households with a cohabiting male who was not the natural father of the children much more leniently than those with a resident spouse or father of the children. This feature created a clear disincentive for marriage and also a clear incentive for divorce, because women who married face the reduction or loss of their AFDC benefits.

One economist was unable to find convincing evidence that welfare programs have a strong effect on the dissolution of marriages. But right or wrong, this argument was among the stepping stones leading to the modification of AFDC toward TANF.

== Termination ==
In 1996, President Bill Clinton negotiated with the Republican-controlled Congress to pass the Personal Responsibility and Work Opportunity Act, which drastically restructured the program. Among other changes, a lifetime limit of five years was imposed on the receipt of benefits; the newly limited nature of the replacement program was reinforced by calling AFDC's successor Temporary Assistance for Needy Families (TANF). Many Americans continue to refer to TANF as "welfare" or AFDC.

TANF has remained controversial. In 2003, LaShawn Y. Warren, an ACLU Legislative Counsel, said that TANF gives states an incentive "to deny benefits to those who need it most. The solution to getting people out of the cycle of poverty is not to prematurely kick them off welfare. Too many have been denied aid unfairly, creating a false impression that the number of people who need help has decreased." In 2006, a New Republic editorial wrote, "A broad consensus now holds that welfare reform was certainly not a disaster—and that it may, in fact, have worked much as its designers had hoped."

== See also ==
- Administration for Children and Families
- Criticism of welfare
- Goldberg v. Kelly
- History of childhood in the United States
- Mothers' pensions, a precursor program to AFDC
- Universal basic income
