= Relationship education =

Counseling and education to better relationships between people

Relationship education and premarital counseling promote practices and principles of premarital education, relationship resources, relationship restoration, relationship maintenance, and evidence-based marriage education.

== History ==
The formal organization of relationship education in the United States began in the late 1970s by a diverse group of professionals concerned that the results of conventional methods and means of marriage therapy resulted in no appreciable reduction in the elevated rate of divorce and out-of-wedlock births.

The motivation for relationship education was found in numerous studied observations of the elevated rates of marital and family breakdown, school dropouts, incarceration, drug addiction, unemployment, suicide, homicide, domestic abuse and other negative social factors when divorce and/or out-of-wedlock pregnancy were noted. In all of the negative categories noted above, statistical over-representation of adults whose childhood did not involve both of their parents was present.

Initial planning for the field of relationship education involved the participation of psychologists, counselors, family life educators, social workers, marriage and family therapists, psychiatrists, clergy from various faith traditions, policymakers, academicians in the fields of social science, attorneys, judges, and lay persons. The goal was to seek the broadest possible dispersal of research and marriage education skills courses which could improve interpersonal relationship functioning, especially with married and pre-marital couples.

Early contributors to the field of relationship education included David and Vera Mace, who founded The Association for Couples in Marriage Enrichment. The Maces conducted their first couples retreat in 1962. Bernard and Louise Guerney launched the "Institute for the Development of Emotional and Life Skills", later known as "Relationship Enhancement", in 1972.

In the United Kingdom, section 34 of the Children and Social Work Act 2017 introduced a statutory requirement for all primary schools to teach relationship education to children from September 2020 onwards. Family and caring relationships, friendships, respect, safety and online relationships are covered in this area. Parents cannot withdraw their children from this element of their education.

== Examples ==
=== Organizations ===
The National Council on Family Relations focuses on preparing professionals in family life education, a prominent approach to relationship education.

=== Government programs ===
In 2006, the U.S. Department of Health and Human Services began funding significant multi-year demonstration projects through the Administration for Children and Families to expand the availability of marriage education classes in more than 100 communities nationwide. This project, known as the "Healthy Marriage Initiative," was designed to improve the well-being of children by providing tools and education to strengthen marriages and families.

=== Researchers ===
Jeffry H. Larson conducted several studies on marriage and relationship education, including a review of three widely used premarital inventories – Focus, Prepare, and Relate.

== Studies ==
=== Relationship education for premarital couples ===
A multi-year US federal study, known as the Building Strong Families Program, and 2010 meta-analysis of 47 studies found that relationship education "does not improve relationship quality/satisfaction" for unmarried couples.

"Previous studies have asserted that premarital education programs have a positive effect on program participants. Using meta-analytic methods of current best practices to look across the entire body of published and unpublished evaluation research on premarital education, we found a more complex pattern of results. We coded 47 studies and found that premarital education programs do not improve relationship quality/satisfaction when unpublished studies are included in the analysis, although studies that follow couples past the honeymoon stage to detect prevention effects are rare. In contrast, premarital education programs appear to be effective at improving couple communication, with studies that employed observational measures rather than self-report measures producing large effects. Still, given the mixed, modest results, there is ample room and a real need to improve the practice of premarital education."

=== Relationship education for married couples ===
Several studies, notably the Supporting Healthy Marriage Project funded by the U.S. Department of Health and Human Services, Administration for Children and Families, a meta-analysis by Hawkins and Ooms and a five-year impact report by Peluso, Eisenberg and Schindler found that relationship education provided statistically significant benefits for married couples.

"The emerging evidence suggests that MRE [marriage and relationship education] programs can work for low-income populations as well as for those who are economically better off. The evidence from a new meta-analysis of 15 program evaluations (including three randomized control trials) shows that MRE programs can have positive, moderate size effects on low-income couples' relationship outcomes, at least in the short run. However, the largest and most rigorous study of low-income, unmarried couples produced mixed results and shows there is still much to learn ... Across nearly all the studies reviewed for this Report, MRE improves communication—a core, essential relationship skill—as well as other measures of relationship quality. There is also some initial evidence that MRE for low-income couples can decrease divorce rates, reduce aggression, and improve children’s problem behaviors."

- The SHM program produced a consistent pattern of small positive effects on multiple aspects of couples’ relationships. Relative to the control group, the program group showed higher levels of marital happiness, lower levels of marital distress, greater warmth and support, more positive communication, and fewer negative behaviors and emotions in their interactions with their spouses. The consistency of results across outcomes and data sources (surveys and independent observations of couple interactions) is noteworthy.
- Compared with individuals in the control group, program group members reported experiencing slightly less psychological and physical abuse from their spouses. Men and women in the program group reported less psychological abuse in their relationships, and men in the program group reported that their spouses physically assaulted them less often, compared with their control group counterparts.
- Men and women in the program group reported slightly lower levels of adult psychological distress (such as feelings of sadness or anxiety) than their control group counterparts.
- The program did not significantly affect whether couples stayed married at the 12-month follow-up point.

== See also ==
- Emotionally focused therapy
- Engagement
- Family life education
- Family therapy
- Family Relations (journal)
- PAIRS Foundation
- Relationship counseling, especially "Methodologies" subheading
- Relationship and Sex Education
- Supporting Healthy Marriage Project
- Building Strong Families Program
- Sex education
- Comprehensive sex education
