= Office of Child Care =

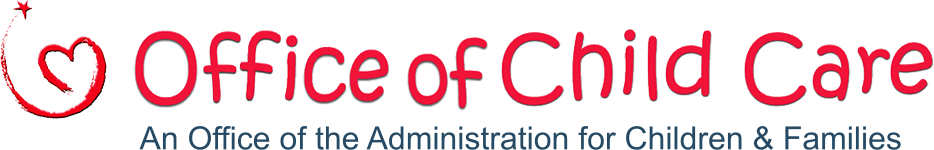
Office of Child Care logo, as of 2018

The Office of Child Care (OCC) is a division of the US Executive Branch under the Administration for Children and Families and the Department of Health and Human Services. It was officially formed in 2010 and replaced the former Child Care Bureau, which was itself established under the Administration on Children, Youth and Families in 1995 by the Clinton Administration. The OCC had been previously established as an unofficial organization within the Child Care Bureau by psychologist Edward Zigler, composed initially of only two staff members.

The OCC administers the Child Care Development Fund (CCDF), to "subsidize the child care expenses of working families with children under age 13", in addition to coordinating with state, territory, and tribal governments on matters relating to child care, supporting child care licensing, and providing guidance and technical assistance. As of 2015 it administered $10 million in funding for research, demonstration and evaluation related to child care, and supports the online archive, Child Care and Early Education Research Connections. As a requirement of the 2014 reauthorization of the CCDF, the OCC also operates the website ChildCare.gov, which provides consumer education to parents, and operates a parental hotline, to report health and safety violations.

As of 2018 the OCC was headed by Director Shannon Christian, and employed 67 full time staff.

== See also ==
- Corporate child care
- Foster care in the United States
- List of federal agencies in the United States
