= Child Care & Early Education Research Connections =

Child Care & Early Education Research Connections (Research Connections) was a joint project of the National Center for Children in Poverty (NCCP) at Columbia University, the Child Care Bureau of the U.S. Department of Health and Human Services, and the Inter-university Consortium for Political and Social Research (ICPSR) at the University of Michigan. Launched in 2004 through a cooperative agreement, Research Connections produced an interdisciplinary, Web-based, relational database of more than 40,000 research documents and public use data sets on topics related to child care and early education. In addition, Research Connections conducted literature reviews, developed and disseminated materials designed to improve child care policy research, provided technical assistance to researchers and policy makers, conducted data analysis workshops, synthesized findings into policy research briefs, and provided support to the Child Care Policy Research Consortium. On September 30, 2025, Research Connections closed, citing on their LinkedIn page that the "cooperative agreement that supports this work is ending"
