= SHM =

SHM may stand for:

- Nanki–Shirahama Airport (IATA: SHM), in Wakayama, Japan
- Sandringham railway station, Melbourne
- Shalimar railway station (station code: SHM) in Howrah, India
- Prefix for several shared memory functions in Unix-like systems (shmat, shmctl, etc.)
- Shek Mun station, Hong Kong, MTR station code
- Simple harmonic motion, in physics
- Somatic hypermutation, allowing immune system adaptation
- Sony Honda Mobility, an electric vehicle manufacturing joint venture
- Structural health monitoring of engineering structures
- Supporting Healthy Marriage, US study
- Swedish House Mafia, a house music supergroup from Stockholm

== See also ==
- Shm-reduplication, an example of reduplication in linguistics
