= Early Childhood Education Journal =

- Discipline: Early Childhood Education
- Language: English
- Edited by: Mary Renck Jalongo

Publication details
- History: 1973 - present
- Publisher: Springer (International)
- Frequency: Bimonthly
- Impact factor: 0.74 (2015)

Standard abbreviations
- ISO 4: Early Child. Educ. J.

Indexing
- ISSN: 1082-3301 (print); 1573-1707 (web)

Links
- Journal homepage

The Early Childhood Education Journal analyzes issues, trends, policies, and practices for early childhood education from birth through age eight.

== Abstracted/Indexed in ==
Academic Search, Cabell's, Contents Pages in Education, CSA/Proquest, Current Abstracts, Educational Management Abstracts, Educational Research Abstracts Online (ERA), Educational Technology Abstracts, ERIC System Database, ERIH, Gale, Google Scholar, HW Wilson, MathEDUC, Mathematics Education, Multicultural Education Abstracts, OCLC, OmniFile, PsycINFO, SCOPUS, Sociology of Education Abstracts, Special Education Needs Abstracts, Studies on Women & Gender Abstracts, Summon by Serial Solutions, Technical Education & Training Abstracts, TOC Premier

== See also ==
- The National Association for the Education of Young Children
- Child Care & Early Education Research
