= Administration for Children and Families =

Division of the United States Department of Health and Human Services

Administration for Children & Families

Administration/Office overview
- Formed: April 15, 1991; 35 years ago
- Jurisdiction: Federal government of the United States
- Headquarters: Mary E. Switzer Memorial Building Washington, D.C., United States
- Administration/Office executives: Alex J. Adams, ACF Assistant Secretary; Cody Inman, Principal Deputy Assistant Secretary; Fred Cooper, Deputy Assistant Secretary for Policy
- Parent department: U.S. Department of Health and Human Services
- Website: acf.gov

The Administration for Children and Families (ACF) is a division of the United States Department of Health and Human Services (HHS). It is headed by the assistant secretary of health and human services for children and families. As of 2026, it has a $72.4 billion budget for 60 programs that target children, youth and families. These programs include assistance with welfare, child support enforcement, adoption assistance, foster care, child care, and child abuse. The agency employs approximately 1,700 staff, including 1,200 federal employees and 500 contractors, where 60% are based in Washington, DC, with the remaining in regional offices located in Boston, New York City, Philadelphia, Atlanta, Chicago, Dallas, Kansas City (Missouri), Denver, San Francisco, and Seattle.

== History ==
ACF's direct predecessor, the Family Support Administration, was created in 1986 by bringing together six existing major programs within HHS. On April 15, 1991, by merging the Office of Human Development Services, the Family Support Administration, and the Maternal and Child Health Block Grant Program were merged to create the Family Support Administration, which was later renamed as the ACF. Section 6 of Reorganization Plan No. 1 of 1953 provided the legal authority for the reorganization.

== Priorities ==
As of October 2026, the ACF has a listed mission statement, values, and priorities. As part of the HHS, the ACF's stated mission in is "to foster health and well-being by providing federal leadership, partnership and resources for the compassionate and effective delivery of human services." The stated values include "family & community first", "personal responsibility & work", "federalism & local leadership", "program integrity & rule of law", "results & evidence", "fiscal stewardship", and "collaboration & accountability". The stated priorities include "promoting quality early learning environments and improved child outcomes", "promoting work and self-sufficiency", "promoting marriage and family formation", "gold-standard research", "ensuring value alignment in funding", "eliminating DEI and gender ideology in funded programs", and "ending taxpayer subsidization of open borders". The ACF's strategy is guided by the following stated principles: "work as the foundation of economic independence", "families as the cornerstone of society", "personal responsibility", and "efficient use of taxpayer dollars".

== Organization ==
- Assistant Secretary
  - Principal Deputy Assistant Secretary
    - Administration for Native Americans
    - Administration for Children, Youth and Families
      - Children's Bureau
      - Family and Youth Services Bureau
    - Office of Community Services
    - Office of Family Assistance
    - Office of Refugee Resettlement
    - Office of Trafficking in Persons
  - Deputy Assistant Secretary for Early Childhood Development
    - Office of Child Care
    - Office of Head Start
  - Deputy Assistant Secretary for Policy
  - Deputy Assistant Secretary for External Affairs
    - Office of Human Services Emergency Preparedness and Response
    - Office of Regional Operations
  - Office of the Assistant Secretary
    - Office of Administration
    - Office of the Chief Information Officer
    - Office of Legislative Affairs and Budget
    - Office of Planning, Research, and Evaluation
    - Office of Communications

== Major programs ==
- Administration for Native Americans (ANA)
- Administration on Children, Youth and Families (ACYF)
- Administration on Developmental Disabilities (ADD)
- Assets for Independence (AFI)
- Office of Child Care (OCC)
- Office of Child Support Enforcement (OCSE)
- Children's Bureau (CB)
- Family and Youth Services Bureau (FYSB)
- Office of Head Start (OHS)
- Healthy Marriage Initiative (HMI)
- Office of Community Services (OCS)
- Low Income Home Energy Assistance Program (LIHEAP)
- Community Services Block Grant (CSBG)
- Social Services Block Grant (SSBG)
- Office of Family Assistance (OFA) / Temporary Assistance for Needy Families (TANF)
- Office of Refugee Resettlement (ORR)
- President's Committee for People with Intellectual Disabilities (PCPID)

== Other initiatives, clearinghouses and resources ==
- Center for Faith-Based and Community Initiatives (CFBCI)
- Child Welfare Information Gateway
- Fatherhood Initiative
- "Insure Kids Now!" Campaign
- National Child Care Information and Technical Assistance Center (NCCIC)
- National Clearinghouse on Families and Youth (NCFY)
- National Responsible Fatherhood Clearinghouse
- National Healthy Marriage Resource Center (NHMRC)
- Office of Child Support Enforcement Tribal Resources

== Abstinence education ==
For fiscal year 2006, ending September 30, 2006, Congress appropriated $50 million for state granted for abstinence education programs. Such programs teach that abstaining from sex is the only effective or acceptable method to prevent pregnancy or disease, and give no instruction on birth control or safe sex. In October 2006, revised guidelines by ACF specified that states seeking grants are "to identify groups ... most likely to bear children out-of-wedlock, targeting adolescents and/or adults within the 12- through 29-year-old age range". Previous guidelines didn't mention specific ages, and programs focused on preteens and teens.

ACF also administers the Community-Based Abstinence Education Program, which is focused on funding public and private entities that provide abstinence-until-marriage education for adolescents from 12 to 18 years old. For fiscal year 2005, 63 grants were awarded, totaling $104 million to organizations and other entities; in fiscal 2001, grants totaled only $20 million. In October 2006, the Government Accountability Office reported that ACF does not review its grantees' education materials for scientific accuracy and does not require grantees of either program to review their own materials for scientific accuracy. GAO also reported that most of the efforts to evaluate the effectiveness of abstinence-until-marriage education programs included in GAO's review have not met certain minimum scientific criteria.

== See also ==
- Aid to Families with Dependent Children
- Child Abuse Reform and Enforcement Act to promote the improvement of information on, and protections against, child sexual abuse.
