= Ladies' Deborah and Child's Protectory =

19th-century day care center and orphanage

Ladies' Deborah and Child's Protectory was a 19th-century day care center and orphanage located at 204 East Broadway. The institution cared for the children, ages two to six years, of indigent parents who worked during the day. The youths were fed and returned to their parents in the evening. Abandoned children were also taken in. A certificate of incorporation was filed at the clerk's office of New York County on March 5, 1878.

The facility opened on the morning of March 24, 1878, when fifty-nine small children were received inside. Ladies' Deborah and Child's Protectory was established by Mrs. P.J. Joachimsen. She was president of the Hebrew Sheltering Guardian Society of New York City.

In January 1880 the New York City Board of Apportionment distributed $1,289.43 from the excise fund to assist in the support of children at the institution, which was then being called Ladies' Deborah Nursery and Child's Protectory.

In March 1883 the Deborah Nursery was located at 95 East Broadway, with a branch at 101 East Broadway and a girls' branch at 423 East 83rd Street. Elbridge T. Gerry, president of the New York Society of Prevention of Cruelty to Children, listed the buildings of the three sites as worthy of attention by the building department, in regard to repairs.

== Child abuse and poor management ==
Israel Schwartz, a thirteen-year-old Jewish boy, accused superintendent Herman Engel, of the nursery, of assaulting him with a cane, in May 1893. Engel was held for examination and fined $300. Schwartz complaint was one of many which were reported around this time.

In November 1896 the facility was ordered to promptly make reforms by the New York City Board of Health. At this instance the nursery was afflicted by the prevalence of ophthalmia. In March 1896 eighty cases of the disease were reported among the children at Ladies' Deborah Nursery and Child's Protectorate. Infected children were quarantined but twenty-two of them were released back to the main building, despite continuing to suffer from various forms of eye diseases. The institution was then located at Eagle Avenue and 161st Street in Manhattan.

== Charity background and aftermath ==
The Ladies' Deborah Relief Association was active at least four years before the opening of the child's protectory. On July 29, 1874 the organization held a benefit for the sick and poor at Bellevue Garden near 80th Street (Manhattan).

In June 1897 the Eagle Avenue site, on the West Side (Manhattan), was sold during a foreclosure. The lot measured 150 feet by 125 feet and possessed a three-story and a four-story building, both composed of brick. $18,687 was due on judgment.
