= Supporting Healthy Marriage Project =

The Supporting Healthy Marriage Project (SHM) is part of the Healthy Marriage Initiative funded by the U.S. Department of Health and Human Services, Administration for Children and Families, that was launched in 2003 as "the first large-scale, multisite, multiyear, rigorous test of marriage education programs for low-income married couples". The project is motivated by research that "indicates that married adults and children raised by both parents in stable, low-conflict households do better on a host of outcomes". The evaluation is led by MDRC, in collaboration with Abt Associates and other partners. USASpending.gov reports payments of more than $30 million from the U.S. Department of Health and Human Services to MDRC for work on the Supporting Healthy Marriage Project from 2009 to 2012.

Major study questions of the Supporting Healthy Marriage Project include:

1. What are the experiences, issues and challenges in designing, implementing and operating healthy marriage education and related services for lower-income couples with children?
2. What are the net impacts of the programs on: marital stability and relationship quality; attitudes and expectations regarding their marriage; parenting attitudes and behaviors; measures of adult well-being and child well-being and development (e.g., cognitive, social, emotional, health), and economic outcomes for families?

Limited federal funding for a Healthy Marriage Initiative began in 2001 to "help couples who choose to get married gain greater access to marriage education services that will enable them to acquire the skills and knowledge necessary to form and sustain a healthy marriage." In 2005, Wade Horn, Assistant Secretary for the Administration for Children and Families, highlighted plans for a significant expansion of funding in testimony before the Subcommittee on 21st Century Competitiveness, House Committee on Education and the Workforce:

"Although I have focused on the areas of primary interest to your committee, I would be remiss if I did not briefly highlight other key areas of our proposal that play a critical role in the well-being of children, teenagers, and families. Indeed, we establish improving the well-being of children as the overarching purpose of TANF.... In support of that overarching purpose, our proposal seeks to improve child well-being through programs aimed at encouraging responsible fatherhood and healthy marriages. By discontinuing the Out of Wedlock Birth Reduction Bonus and redirecting part of the High Performance Bonus Funding, we provide $200 million for programs aimed at promoting family formation and healthy marriages. We also provide $40 million in funding for the support of responsible fatherhood and healthy marriage programs to reverse the rise in father absence and its subsequent impact on children."

== Rationale ==
When the program was launched, The Heritage Foundation explained, "The erosion of marriage during the past four decades has had large-scale negative effects on both children and adults: It lies at the heart of many of the social problems with which the government currently grapples. The beneficial effects of marriage on individuals and society are beyond reasonable dispute, and there is a broad and growing consensus that government policy should promote rather than discourage healthy marriage. In response to these trends, President George W. Bush has proposed--as part of welfare reform reauthorization--the creation of a pilot program to promote healthy and stable marriage. Participation in the program would be strictly voluntary. Funding for the program would be small-scale: $300 million per year. This sum represents one penny to promote healthy marriage for every five dollars government currently spends to subsidize single parenthood. Moreover, this small investment today could result in potentially great savings in the future by reducing dependence on welfare and other social services."

== Proponents ==
The Heritage Foundation and Brookings Institution were early proponents.

"By fostering better life decisions and stronger relationship skills, marriage programs can increase child well-being and adult happiness and reduce child poverty and welfare dependence. Yet opponents make it sound as if the government would be forcing people into unhappy unions. It's nonsense."

"Federal and state legislation enacted over the past decade clearly reflects a growing national interest in reducing the number of children growing up without both parents.... The central policy question is whether it is possible to implement programs that can increase the number of children who are raised by both parents in healthy and stable marriages, especially within disadvantaged populations known to be at higher risk for family instability."

In 2006 testimony to a House Appropriations Subcommittee, Wade Horn further highlighted the program's goals in a request for increased funding:

"As you know, research shows that healthy and stable marriages support children and limit the need for government programs. Whether the problem is abuse, neglect, or poverty, the evidence is clear that the best chance a child has of avoiding these problems is to grow up with their mother and father in a stable, healthy marriage. Research also shows that adults in healthy marriages are happier and healthier. A report from the Institute for American Values suggests that communities with high rates of healthy marriages evidence fewer social problems such as crime and welfare dependency, compared to those with low rates of healthy marriages.... The new funding will support a variety of activities that will provide interested individuals and couples with the skills and knowledge necessary to form and sustain healthy marriages. For example, it will allow us to fund programs to: help high school students learn to develop healthy relationships and gain knowledge about the value and benefits of healthy marriage for themselves and their future children, if they desire to marry and have children; offer pre-marital services to help engaged couples focus on topics critical to the long-term health of their relationship and marriage; offer help to married couples who are struggling, to gain skills to revitalize and strengthen their marriage; work with non-married pregnant women and expectant fathers interested in marriage to gain the skills that are necessary to form and sustain healthy marriages and help them with parenting and financial management skills as well as with finding employment or advancing to higher wage jobs; and reduce the disincentives to marriage in means-tested aid if offered in conjunction with any of the above mentioned activities. In addition, to expand the initiative provided in the Deficit Reduction Act, the Administration’s FY 2007 budget proposes to establish a competitive matching grant program for family formation and marriage. One hundred million dollars in competitive grants would be targeted to innovative approaches to promoting healthy marriage and reducing out-of-wedlock births."

== Early concerns ==
"Although promoting marriage is undeniably a laudable aim, whether government programs can effectively promote marriage is far from certain. Government has virtually no track record on this issue. Moreover, before Congress commits to making significant investments in an unproven arena, policy makers must address an even more fundamental question: Can marriage really be a panacea that helps poor women and their children lead better lives or are supporters of marriage promotion overpromising the benefits of their agenda? Answering this question isn’t easy. Although the empirical evidence in support of marriage is incontrovertible, there is still a great deal we need to know before state [TANF] programs move too rapidly into uncharted territory. Studies on the 'retreat from marriage' in the United States abound, but we have surprisingly little information about the marital behavior of those women about whom policy makers are most concerned: low-income and welfare-dependent unwed mothers."

"Marriage promotion represents a cornerstone of social conservatives' domestic policy agenda, and proposals designed to promote and strengthen marriage are gaining currency at all levels of government. Since taking office, President Bush has promised to invest in marriage promotion on an unprecedented scale through his proposal to reauthorize the nation's welfare reform law, and legislation pending before Congress would allocate substantial funding toward that end. Yet even as the president waits for Congress to act, his administration is finding ways to devote significant funding to marriage promotion activities through existing programs and funding streams.

"A variety of new federal and state initiatives are attempting to promote family formation and healthy marriage among interested couples, including poor and minority couples who have had babies outside marriage. Careful evaluations of these programs should identify which are most effective.

"A marriage movement is underway, as efforts to promote marriage, strengthen two-parent families and reduce divorce gain momentum around the country. And yet, no one can say with certainty how the government should effectively put marriage education and promotion programs into place, or if those programs will achieve their desired goals."

"Some states are poised to develop and provide programs to support healthy marriages, as called for by the Bush administration.... If political support for these programs is to grow, evidence that they work for the right populations will be critical."

== Opposition ==
"With congressional Republicans beating the drum about profligate and wasteful government spending, they may want to take a hard look at a federal program pushed by a host of top GOPers during the Bush-era and reauthorized in late 2010, as the Republican deficit craze took hold. Originally championed by Republican lawmakers including Iowa Sen. Chuck Grassley, former Pennsylvania Sen. Rick Santorum, and current Kansas Gov. Sam Brownback, a federal initiative to promote marriage as a cure for poverty dumped hundreds of millions of dollars into programs that either had no impact or a negative effect on the relationships of the couples who took part."

"The Alternatives to Marriage Project opposes marriage promotion because it stigmatizes unmarried people and institutionalizes discrimination against singles and diverse family forms. We believe that policies designed to help children should focus on supporting all the types of families in which children really live. We believe that people who care for one another should be supported in their efforts to build healthy, happy relationships ... There is no evidence that it is an effective way to help people escape poverty. It diverts funds from poverty-fighting programs that have been proven to work."

== Initial findings ==
=== Program impact ===
In an early impact study on the effectiveness of "skills-based relationship education programs designed to help low-income married couples strengthen their relationships and, in turn, to support more stable and more nurturing home environments and more positive outcomes for parents and their children," MDRC reported:

- The SHM program produced a consistent pattern of small positive effects on multiple aspects of couples’ relationships. Relative to the control group, the program group showed higher levels of marital happiness, lower levels of marital distress, greater warmth and support, more positive communication, and fewer negative behaviors and emotions in their interactions with their spouses. The consistency of results across outcomes and data sources (surveys and independent observations of couple interactions) is noteworthy.
- Compared with individuals in the control group, program group members reported experiencing slightly less psychological and physical abuse from their spouses. Men and women in the program group reported less psychological abuse in their relationships, and men in the program group reported that their spouses physically assaulted them less often, compared with their control group counterparts.
- Men and women in the program group reported slightly lower levels of adult psychological distress (such as feelings of sadness or anxiety) than their control group counterparts.
- The program did not significantly affect whether couples stayed married at the 12-month follow-up point.
- SHM had little effect on indicators of coparenting, parenting, or child well-being. Of the outcomes examined, only a few of the impact estimates are significant. Moreover, the magnitudes of these impacts are very small, and the results did not remain statistically significant after additional statistical tests were conducted to adjust for the number of outcomes examined.

The initial impact report is based on 12-month follow-up with 4,989 program participants and control groups at sites in Florida (Orlando), Kansas (Wichita), Pennsylvania (Reading and Bethlehem), Texas (El Paso and San Antonio), New York (Bronx), Oklahoma (Oklahoma City), and Washington (Shoreline and Seattle).

=== Program implementation ===
- Local programs implemented the SHM model in adherence with established guidelines. Program designers and evaluators consider the implemented programs a fair field test of the SHM model. The core marriage education workshops were implemented consistently across program locations, but there was more variation in implementation of the other two program components.
- Couples engaged in SHM services and continued participating over time. Ninety-one percent of couples participated in at least one program service. On average, couples completed 27 hours of services across the three components, and those who initiated attendance remained engaged for approximately eight months.
- Multiple strategies supported the implementation process. Written curricula, protocols, and performance benchmarks established expectations for the content, frequency, and quality of SHM services. Technical assistance teams held programs accountable for working toward their goals, and they offered assistance to improve programs’ performance over time.
- Couples who enrolled are a diverse and relatively disadvantaged group. Most couples who enrolled in SHM had low or modest income; many are Hispanic; and more than half reported thinking that their marriage was in trouble in the past year.
- SHM services were implemented in diverse agency settings. Host agencies include community-based organizations, private for-profit entities, a hospital, and a university. Within the broad parameters of the program model, these agencies played an important role in shaping implementation.

== Publications ==
- "Designing a Marriage Education Demonstration and Evaluation for Low-Income Married Couples," August 2008.
- "Spending Time Together: Time Use Estimates for Economically Disadvantaged and Nondisadvantaged Married Couples in the United States," September 2009.
- "Early Lessons from the Implementation of a Relationship and Marriage Skills Program for Low-Income Married Couples," September 2010.
- "Supporting Healthy Marriage: Early Impacts on Low-Income Families," February 2012.
- "Supporting Healthy Marriage: Final Implementation Findings," August 2012.
- "Supporting Healthy Marriage: 30-Month Impact Report," Scheduled for Fall 2013.
