= Firmin Marbeau =

French philanthropist

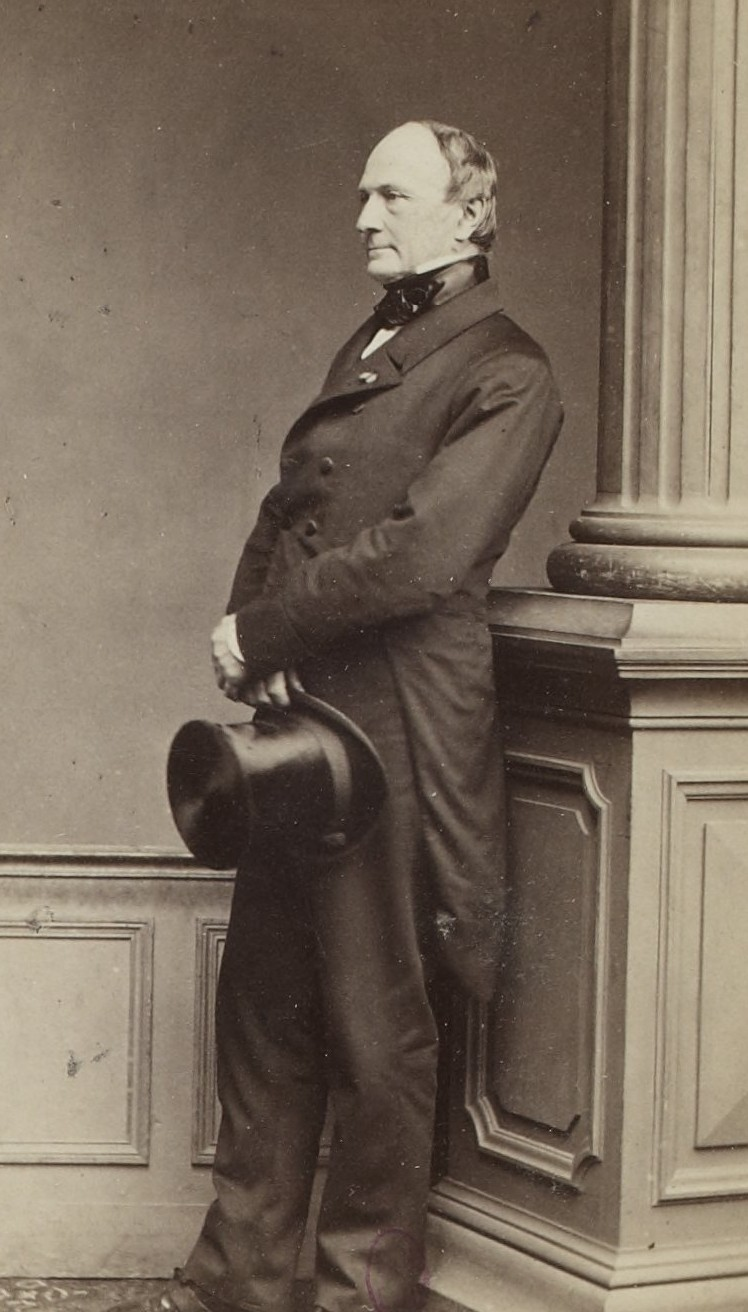
Marbeau in the 1860s

Jean Firmin Marbeau (1798 – October 10, 1875) was a French philanthropist who pioneered the crèche movement, a forerunner of modern day care.

Marbeau was born in Brive-la-Gaillarde, and was by profession a lawyer in Paris. He is best known for founding the first crèche, which opened in Paris on November 14, 1844. The crèche provided child care to enable working-class mothers to work jobs outside of the home, and spawned a Crèche Movement that led to a number of similar establishments being opened in France; the concept was also influential on the development of day care in North America. Marbeau wrote a number of books promoting the concept, and died in Saint-Cloud in 1875.

== Writings ==
- Politique des intérêts (1834)
- Études sur l'économie sociale (1844)
- Des crèches (1845)
- Du paupérisme en France (1847)
- De l'indigence et des secours (1850)
