= Office of Child Support Enforcement =

The Office of Child Support Services (OCSS) is a United States government office responsible for overseeing the U.S. child support program. Child support is the obligation on parents to provide financial support for their children. OCSS was established with the Federal Government’s enactment of Child Support Enforcement and Paternity Establishment Program (CSE) in 1975, which was enacted to reduce welfare expenses by collecting child support from non-custodial parents.

The mission of OCSS is to increase the reliability of child support paid by parents when they live apart from their children. The program accomplishes this by locating parents, establishing legal fatherhood (paternity), establishing and enforcing fair support orders, increasing health care coverage for children, removing barriers to payment, such as referring parents to employment services, supporting healthy co-parenting relationships, supporting responsible fatherhood, and helping to prevent and reduce family violence.

== Program history ==
In 1935 a program was created as a result of the Social Security Act called the Aid to Families with Dependent Children (AFDC). It was formed to service the needs of low-income or no-income families, and especially, the needs of children living in single parent homes. Particular focus was placed on children who had lost a parent to death or abandonment.

The need for services expanded over time as issues affecting dependent children changed. By the 1970s it was recognized that reasons for financial assistance had clearly evolved from AFDC’s original intent. As opposed to helping children who had lost one parent to death or abandonment, the majority of the needed aid increased because couples were divorcing, separating, or never had been married. Recognizing this, the Federal Government enacted the Child Support Enforcement and Paternity Establishment Program (CSE) in 1975. This act was put in place to not only pursue a parent who was responsible for the financial support of a child, but to also establish paternity for a child who is born outside of marriage, so child support can be collected from the biological father. The Law also amended the Social Security Act (Title IV, part D), authorizing Federal matching funds for enforcement purposes—locating nonresident parents, establishing paternity, establishing child support awards, and collecting child support payments.

OCSS was established with the Federal Government’s enactment of CSE of 1975. AFDC was abolished by the Personal Responsibility and Work Opportunity Reconciliation Act of 1996, and replaced by a much stricter legal standard known today as TANF—Temporary Assistance for Needy Families. TANF is a matching block grant program. States are required to meet certain federal standards in areas such as increasing paternal identification, linking networks between states to identify and locate parents and their assets (through the Federal Parent Locator Service (FPLS)), and applying more enforcement techniques to receive the block grant funding.

== Organizational structure ==
State and tribal agencies are the primary administrators of the CSE program, but the federal office, OCSS, serves to direct and help state and tribal child support agencies. OCSS is an office within the Administration for Children and Families (ACF), which is a division of the U.S. Department of Health and Human Services (HHS). It helps states and tribes to design their programs, provides children medical and emotional support, technical assistance, funding, assistance in locating responsible parents, and assistance in collecting child support payments. For parents, the service provides referrals to employment, support for responsible fatherhood, and coparenting, and takes efforts to prevent and reduce family violence. The OCSS Commissioner is responsible for the U.S. child support program as a whole and OCSS conducts audits on the various state and tribal programs to ensure that they abide by federal statutes and have effective programs in place.

== Program budget and size ==
OCSS receives its funding from congressionally directed appropriations.

Year	Appropriation
2007	$4.4b
2008	$4.3b
2009	$4.3b
2010	$4.7b
2011	$4.2b
2012	$3.9b
2013	$3.9b
2014	$4.0b
2015	$4.0b
2016	$4.0b

In the 2010 fiscal year, the program collected $27.3 billion, of which 94% was distributed to families. In the 2011 fiscal year, OCSS served 17.3 million children and their parents nationwide.

== Program relationships with other programs/agencies ==
The OCSS does not directly provide services to individuals or families. They partner with and support other federal, state, tribal, and local agencies to administer their programs. They help these agencies comply with federal law and develop and maintain their programs. One of the ways they do this is by working together to implement information systems that support automated management of child support collections. Each state and tribe must have an automated system approved, certified, and monitored by OCSS.

Because of the partnership between the child support program and the nation’s financial institutions states have been able to significantly increase collections for families by freezing and seizing bank accounts to pay past due support debts. OCSS administers the Insurance Match program with insurance companies or their designated agents, state workers’ compensation agencies, and the U.S. Department of Labor.

Another important aspect of the child support program’s mission is to integrate research into effective child support policies. OCSS collaborates with grantees and many public and private partners to develop evidence-based research initiatives to produce the best outcomes for children and families.

OCSS also collects and analyzes data from state and tribal child support agencies. The data is used to develop an annual report to Congress, highlighting program achievements and statistics about caseload, collections and expenses.

OCSS proposes and implements national policy for the child support program. They also provide guidance and training to help states and tribes develop and operate their individual programs according to federal law.

OCSS offers two discretionary grant program opportunities that further the national child support program’s mission and goals: (1) Section 1115 Demonstration Grants, which contract with other agencies, faith- and community-based organizations, universities, or private consultants to join in these efforts and (2) Special Improvement Project (SIP) Grants, which provide federal funds for research and demonstration programs and special projects of regional or national significance relating to the operation of state child support programs.

== Program relationships with other levels of Government, nonprofits and businesses ==
Child support programs work with district or state attorneys, law enforcement agencies and officials of family or domestic relations courts to deliver services at the local level. OCSS is the U.S. central authority for international child support and provides assistance to families, states, and countries seeking support when family members live in different countries. OCSS works with many public and private partners to increase child support collections and help parents meet the financial needs of their children. Employers are vital to the child support program. The majority of child support (70%) is collected through direct wage withholding. Employers are responsible to report newly hired and terminated employees, withhold child support payments as ordered, enroll children in health care coverage, and remit child support to the State Disbursement Units.

A critical function of OCSS is authorized data matching. Employers are required to report newly hired employees to their designated state agency. OCSS gathers and maintains these records to match against state child support records to locate parents who owe child support, locate income sources and prevent erroneous payments and fraudulent access to government benefit programs.

== Challenges ==
OCSS has many enforcement tools to collect child support such as wage withholding, and bank account seizures. OSCS also has tools to punish those who do not comply, such as driver’s license and passport suspensions. The challenge that the OCSS faces is what to do when such tools do not work. Unemployment throws a wrench in these processes. As an example, whenever there is an economic downturn many single parents who are not well educated or well-trained are the first to lose their jobs and the last to be rehired. As a result, they lose income that then cannot be collected for child support.

Other challenges that OCSS faces are balancing the rights and responsibilities of non-custodial parents with the needs of the custodial parent and child. Many non-custodial parents feel they are powerless in the child support establish and collection process. They will sometimes feel resentful and offended, which leads to a lack of cooperation in paying their child support.

Another challenge is establishing paternity and support orders for children that are a product of same sex relationships. For example, determining the support and custody of a child can be complicated because the courts need to take into consideration the biological parenthood of the child, and the rights of surrogate parents who desire to raise the child. Some courts will determine that a person who agrees to start a family with a same-sex partner, with plans to raise children together, is a parent and, therefore, is responsible for child support.

In conclusion, child support has evolved over time from serving families on welfare, or children who had lost parents to war and abandonment, to working through the complications of a modern society where parents with children are divorced, separated, or who were never married. Working with various public and private partners OCSS and their state affiliates collect billions of dollars in support for dependent children across the country.
