= Building Strong Families Program =

The Building Strong Families Program (BSF) is part of the Healthy Marriage Initiative funded by the U.S. Department of Health and Human Services, Administration for Children and Families, "to learn whether well-designed interventions can help couples fulfill their aspirations for a healthy relationship, marriage, and a strong family."

Between 2002-2011, "BSF programs were implemented by non-profit and public agencies at 12 locations in seven states, and enrolled more than 5,000 volunteer couples ... The intervention featured up to 42 hours of multi-couple group sessions led by trained facilitators, focusing on skills that, according to earlier research, are associated with relationship and marital stability and satisfaction."

The ten-year program was implemented through a contract by the Administration for Children and Families with Mathematica Policy Research.

Major study questions of the Building Strong Families Project included:

- Foundation: What underlying conditions, preparation, resources, and context make it possible to implement programs that focus on promoting healthy marriage for a target population of low-income unwed couples with children? On what theories of behavior and family well-being do the programs rest? What types of organizations are well suited to operating such programs?
- Operation: What are the important issues and challenges in designing, implementing, and operating programs, and what lessons can be drawn from the program experience? What services are included, and how do they complement existing programs for low-income families?
- Participation: Who participates and for how long? What services do they receive? How does participation differ for subgroups?
- Impacts: How do BSF programs affect couples’ attitudes and expectations about marriage, the quality and stability of their relationships, and whether they marry? What effects are found on parents and their relationships with their children, and the well-being and development of children? Which program designs work best?

== Rationale ==
"Strengthening relationships and increasing fathers' involvement have emerged as central national policy strategies to improve the lives of low-income families and enhance the well-being of children. We are conducting studies to increase understanding about how to help low-income couples solidify their relationships, engage fathers more fully, and create the best environments in which to raise children ... [our] 10-year Building Strong Families demonstration is testing whether workshops on communication and relationship skills, combined with social supports, can help unwed parents stay together, manage conflict, maintain intimacy, increase the degree to which fathers are involved in their children’s lives, and improve children’s early development. The study is using a rigorous random assignment design and includes more than 5,000 couples in seven states. A report released in May 2010 provides short-term results on BSF’s impacts on couples after about 15 months, focusing on the stability and quality of the couples’ relationships."

== Impact report ==
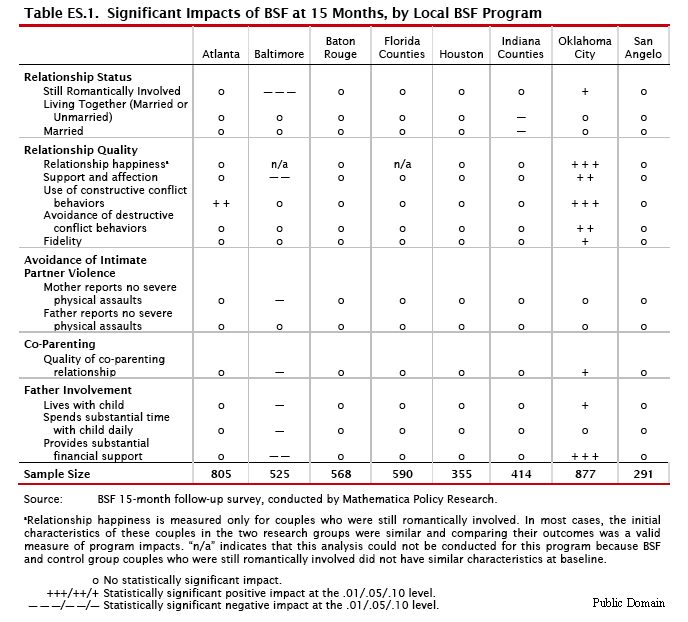
BSF 15-Month Impact Report

In May 2010, Mathematica reported findings from a 15-month follow-up of program and control group participants:

- BSF had no effect on whether couples were still together 15 months after they had applied for the program, when data from the eight BSF programs are combined. At this point, 76 percent of BSF couples were still romantically involved, compared with 77 percent of control group couples. Similarly, BSF and control group couples were equally likely to be married to each other at that time (17 and 18 percent respectively) and to be living together, whether married or unmarried (62 percent for both research groups)."
- Fifteen months after they applied for the program, BSF and control group couples reported being equally happy in their romantic relationships, with average ratings of 8.4 and 8.3 respectively on a 0-to-10 relationship happiness scale. Similarly, BSF and control group couples gave very similar ratings of supportiveness and affection in their relationships, with average support and affection scale values of 3.5 on a 1-to-4 scale for couples in both research groups. In addition, BSF had no overall effect on how faithful couples were to each other.
- When results are averaged across all eight programs, BSF did not improve couples’ ability to manage their conflict. Couples in both research groups reported similar levels of use of constructive conflict behaviors, such as keeping a sense of humor and listening to the other partner’s perspective during disagreements. Similarly, there was no difference between the research groups in the avoidance of destructive conflict behaviors, such as withdrawing when there is a disagreement or allowing small disagreements to escalate. In addition, when results are averaged across all programs, BSF had no effect on how likely couples were to experience intimate partner violence. Similarly, when results are averaged across all programs, BSF did not improve co-parenting or increase father involvement. BSF and control group couples reported that their co-parenting relationships were of equally high quality. In addition, at the 15-month follow-up, couples in both research groups were equally likely to report that fathers were living with their children, spending substantial time with them, and providing them with substantial financial support.
- The Baltimore BSF program [Loving Couples, Loving Children] had negative effects on couples’ relationships. BSF couples were less likely than control group couples to remain romantically involved, 59 percent versus 70 percent. Baltimore BSF couples reported being less supportive and affectionate toward each other than control group couples did. In addition, women in the Baltimore BSF program were more likely than women in the control group to report having been severely physically assaulted by a romantic partner in the past year, 15 percent compared with 9 percent. Baltimore BSF couples also rated the quality of their co-parenting relationship lower than control group couples did and reported that BSF fathers spent less time with their children and were less likely to provide them financial support than control group fathers were.

== Impact debate ==
Scholars offered different perspectives on the findings:

A study from Harvard's Kennedy School reported: "In general, at the time of the 15-month follow-up the BSF intervention did not have a statistically or substantively significant effect on couples‘ relationship status or quality, or fathers‘ involvement with their children. Although the BSF had little or no effect on couples‘ relationships overall, impacts varied meaningfully across the eight evaluation sites; for example, the Oklahoma City site‘s BSF program had a consistent pattern of positive effects at 15 months. Perhaps most surprisingly, however, at the Baltimore site the BSF intervention had numerous negative effects: at the time of the 15-month follow-up survey, Baltimore couples who had been randomly assigned to participate in the BSF program were much less likely than control group couples to be romantically involved; fathers assigned to the BSF program were less likely to provide substantial financial support for their children or see them regularly; and mothers in the BSF sample were more likely to report experiencing a severe physical assault than were mothers in the control group."

In an article for RH Reality Check, Joseph DiNorcia wrote, "The evidence is unmistakable: there’s just no amount of government coaxing that will make unmarried couples want to, as Beyoncé would say, 'put a ring on it.' A new report from Mathematica Policy Research, Inc, shows that the relationship skills education programs implemented by the Administration for Children and Families have, with a few exceptions, no effect on participants. These programs provide 'education' and support services to unmarried, low-income, heterosexual couples with newborn babies, and are among the marriage-promotion projects which had been enthusiastically touted by the Bush administration as a magic pill for poverty and unstable families."

Scott Stanley, Ph.D. and Frank Fincham, Ph.D., two leading researchers in the field of Marriage and Relationship Education (MRE), attributed the impact findings to flaws in program implementation, arguing: "A summary from the BSF study that marriage/relationship education (MRE) does not work is not tenable, in our view. In addition to studying many other aspects of program and delivery, BSF really became more of a study of participation rates than of the impacts of MRE and other program elements. The main reason is that, in many sites, the 'dose' of MRE that couples received was quite low. In fact, in some sites, only 40% of couples ever attended even one session together."

== BSF Study Sites ==
Location	Curriculum	Couples Enrolled (3/31/07)	Percent of Couples Completing 80% or More of Program	Approximate Cost Per Couple	Approximate Total Cost
Atlanta, GA (English)	Loving Couples, Loving Children	388	23%	$8,836	$3.4 million
Atlanta, GA (Spanish)	Loving Couples, Loving Children	73	40%	$8,836	$.6 million
Baltimore, MD	Loving Couples, Loving Children	384	12%	$11,278	$4.3 million
Baton Rouge, LA	Loving Couples, Loving Children	308	30%	$8,852	$2.7 million
Broward County, FL	Loving Couples, Loving Children	235	3%	$14,169	$3.3 million
Orange County, FL	Loving Couples, Loving Children	319	7%	$14,169	$4.5 million
Allen County, IL	Loving Couples, Loving Children	59	20%	$12,095	$.7 million
Lake County, IL	Loving Couples, Loving Children	45	0%	$12,095	$.5 million
Marion County, IL	Loving Couples, Loving Children	139	15%	$12,095	$1.7 million
Oklahoma City, OK	Becoming Parents	294	40%	$11,149	$3.3 million
Houston, TX	Love's Cradle	220	3%	$10,112	$2.2 million
San Angelo, TX	Love's Cradle	219	12%	$12,607	$2.8 million

== BSF Curricula ==
Curriculum	Developer	Couples Per Group	Curriculum Hours
Loving Couples, Loving Children	John and Julie Gottman	4-6 couples	42
Love's Cradle	Mary Ortwein and Bernard Guerney	6-8 couples	42
Becoming Parents for Low-Income, Low-Literacy Couples	Pamela Jordan (Prep, Inc.)	10-15 couples	30

"Loving Couples Loving Children (LCLC) is a curriculum developed by John and Julie Gottman especially for low-income couples who are expecting a child. John Gottman is world-renowned for his scientific work identifying the predictors of relationship success and failure, while Julie Gottman is a master clinician who provides advanced training in marriage education and couples therapy ... To engage and retain the interest of low-income couples, they substantially modified the presentation of the material by developing a series of video 'talk shows' in which racially and ethnically diverse low-income couples discuss relationship issues. Each of the forty-two sessions in LCLC begins with such a talk show, which leads to a lively discussion among group participants. In these unscripted shows real couples, not actors, describe the challenges they have faced in their relationship and how they overcame them. The second half of each group session is devoted to activities that teach specific skills and techniques that couples can use to address the issues raised in the video. Participants practice skills with their partners during the session, with individual attention from the male and female co-facilitators, as needed."

"Love's Cradle is based on the well-established Relationship Enhancement (RE) program, adapted and supplemented by new material developed especially to address issues identified by researchers as crucial barriers to positive family formation in fragile families. Created by Mary Ortwein, a marriage and family therapist with experience serving low-income families, and Bernard Guerney, the original developer of RE, Love's Cradle relies on a simplified and more culturally sensitive version of Relationship Enhancement taught at the fifth-grade level, and adds content to the standard RE skills. The simplified version avoids psychological jargon and teaches skills at a slower pace, with greater access to individual skills coaching. Love's Cradle consists of twenty-one two-hour group sessions. Ten sessions, most at the beginning of the program, are devoted to the simplified RE skills. Additional sessions allow couples to use their new skills to address the issues indicated by research to be common to low-income couples, including how to build, rebuild, and maintain trust; deal with multiple- partner fertility; manage emotions; work as a team on money matters; and reframe their understanding of marriage. Love's Cradle was field-tested with low-income couples and will be part of the Building Strong Families national evaluation."

"The Becoming Parents Program (BPP) curriculum, developed by Dr. Pamela Jordan, focused on three areas: (1) communication, problem-solving, friendship, and fun; (2) self-care and anger management; and (3) infant care and development. To meet BSF requirements, BPP was adapted to include material relevant for low-income families. The information on communication, problem-solving, friendship, and fun was largely drawn from the PREP curriculum. Skills included using a 'speaker–listener' technique, establishing ground rules, identifying hidden issues, and maintaining friendship and fun in the relationship. The focus on self-care and anger management included such strategies as using time-out to prevent escalation. Material was adapted from the Stop Anger and Violence Prevention program and the Domestic Conflict Containment Program."

== Publications ==
"Catalog of Research: Programs for Low-Income Couples," Mathematica Policy Research, May 2012.

"The Effects of Building Strong Families: A Healthy Marriage and Relationship Skills Education Program for Unmarried Parents", Wood, Robert G., et al., Spring 2012.

"BSF's Effects on Couples Who Attended Group Relationship Skills Sessions: A Special Analysis of 15-Month Data," May 15, 2011

"The Building Strong Families Project: Initial Implementation of a Couples-Focused Employment Program," October 15, 2010

"Strengthening Unmarried Parents' Relationships: The Early Impacts of Building Strong Families Executive Summary," May 10, 2010.

"Effects of Employment on Marriage: Evidence from a Randomized Study of the Job Corps Program," December 17, 2008.

"Implementing Healthy Marriage Programs for Unmarried Couples with Children: Early Lessons from the Building Strong Families Project," July 17, 2006.
