= Wade Horn =

American psychologist

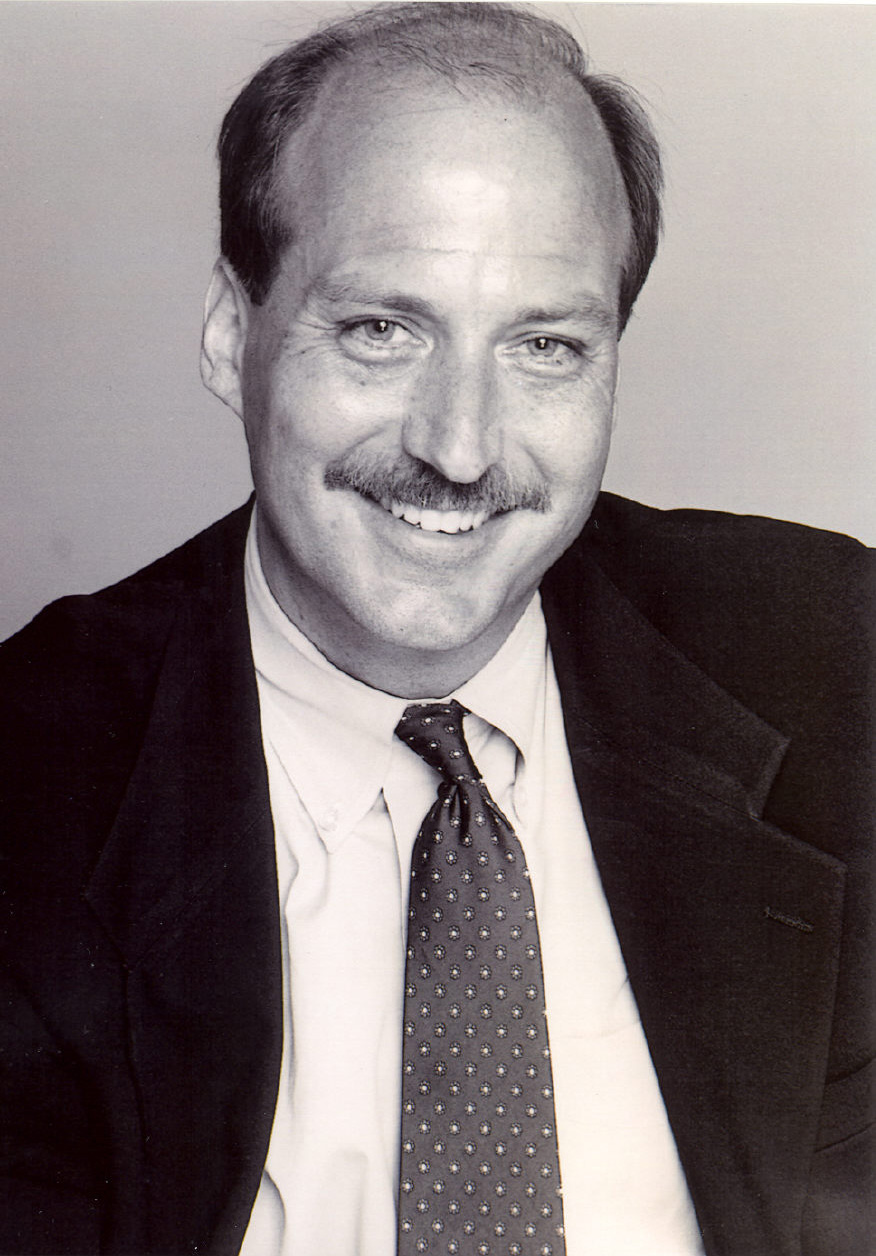
Wade F. Horn

Wade F. Horn is an American psychologist who received his PhD from Southern Illinois University in 1981. He served as President George W. Bush's Assistant Secretary for Children and Families from 2001 to 2007, overseeing the Administration for Children and Families, an agency within the United States Department of Health and Human Services, before resigning on April 1, 2007. He also served under President George H.W. Bush as Commissioner of Children, Youth, and Families within the Administration for Children and Families.

Horn is an advocate for re-envisioning and revising the Federal Head Start program. He has also served as president of the National Fatherhood Initiative and was an assistant professor of psychology at Michigan State University. Additionally, he was an affiliate scholar at the right-wing think tank, the Hudson Institute.

== Tenure ==
Horn has been a supporter and participant in the Coalition for Marriage, Family, and Couples Education, an educational organization concerning family life.

== Criticism ==
Horn has been criticized by Planned Parenthood and other sexual health education organizations for his advocacy of abstinence programs. During his term with Health and Humans Services, he oversaw increases in funding for both abstinence education and relationship education. Under Horn's administration, these programs are believed to have contained misrepresentations regarding contraceptives, HIV and pregnancy.

== Sources ==
- US Department of Health & Human Service.
