= CARE Act =

United States federal law

The Child Abuse Reform and Enforcement (CARE) Act is a United States law aiming to "promote the improvement of information on, and protections against, child sexual abuse".

== Major provisions of the act ==
The Child Abuse Reform and Enforcement Act was enacted on March 10, 2000, to reduce the incidence of child abuse and neglect.

Major Provisions of the Act

- "Authorized the use of Federal law enforcement funds by States to improve the criminal justice system in order to provide timely, accurate, and complete criminal history record information to child welfare agencies, organizations, and programs that are engaged in the assessment of activities related to the protection of children, including protection against child sexual abuse, and placement of children in foster care
- Allowed the use of Federal grants by law enforcement:
  - To enforce child abuse and neglect laws, including laws protecting against child sexual abuse
  - To promote programs designed to prevent child abuse and neglect
  - To establish or support cooperative programs between law enforcement and media organizations to collect, record, retain, and disseminate information useful in the identification and apprehension of suspected criminal offenders
- Increased the amount of federally collected funds available to the States for implementation of State Children's Justice Act reforms"
