= Corporate child care =

Child care managed by an employer

Corporate child care is a specific form of child care sponsored or managed by an employer. It may be a perk or a part of the corporate social responsibility policy of the company. It can provide the working parents with an opportunity to find work–life balance. The corporations sponsor child care as it may increase employee loyalty, lower workforce absenteeism, decrease maternity leaves and improve on-job concentration.

== Scope ==
Companies have started corporate child care arrangements for young employees, many of whom aspire to establish a work–life balance while pursuing a career and gaining money. Many working parents face challenges such as lack of free places in public pre-schools, inappropriate schedule, expensive services of private child care and preschools, low quality of services or little time spending with a child. The corporate child care programs intend to address these issues. Such a program may cover the following:

- The company provides new child care places for children
- Timetable is adjusted to parents working hours
- The company can cover all the expenses or share them with parents
- Better quality (due to recruitment system, ongoing education, teachers’ development)
- More time to spend with children (during the transfer time)

== Realization model ==
Each program provides children with appropriate development environment and education model designed by high-qualified teachers

- Nido environment from 0 up to 1 year old
- Corporate child center for children 0–3 years old
- Corporate kindergarten/center for children 3–6 years old
- Back-up care for children 0–3 и 3–6 years old
- Corporate children camp for children of different ages (from 3 up to 14) for holidays

== Possible benefits ==
- Increased loyalty of all employees
- Qualification maintenance of employees during the maternity leave
- Reduced employee absenteeism
- Decreased healthcare costs
- Increased employee productivity
- Strengthened image of caring and responsible employer
- Developed family-oriented corporate culture
- Cost saved on recruiting and training new employees
