= National Center for Children in Poverty =

U.S. non-partisan research center

National Center for Children in Poverty (NCCP) is an American non-partisan research center that promotes the interests of children in low-income families. The center covers a number of topics, including child poverty, adolescent health and youth development, healthy development, low-wage work, and children's mental health.

The center was established at Columbia University in 1989 as part of the Mailman School of Public Health. In July 2019, NCCP moved from Columbia University to join the Bank Street College of Education.

The NCCP conducts research in areas relevant to family well-being and publishes over 30 documents a year, ranging from fact sheets to full reports, including a compendium of sources related to child well-being collected from more than 200 journals and websites.

The NCCP is supported through government sources, corporations and foundations, and individual and private owners. It is primarily funded by foundation grants and federal funding.
