= Child care =

Care and supervision of children

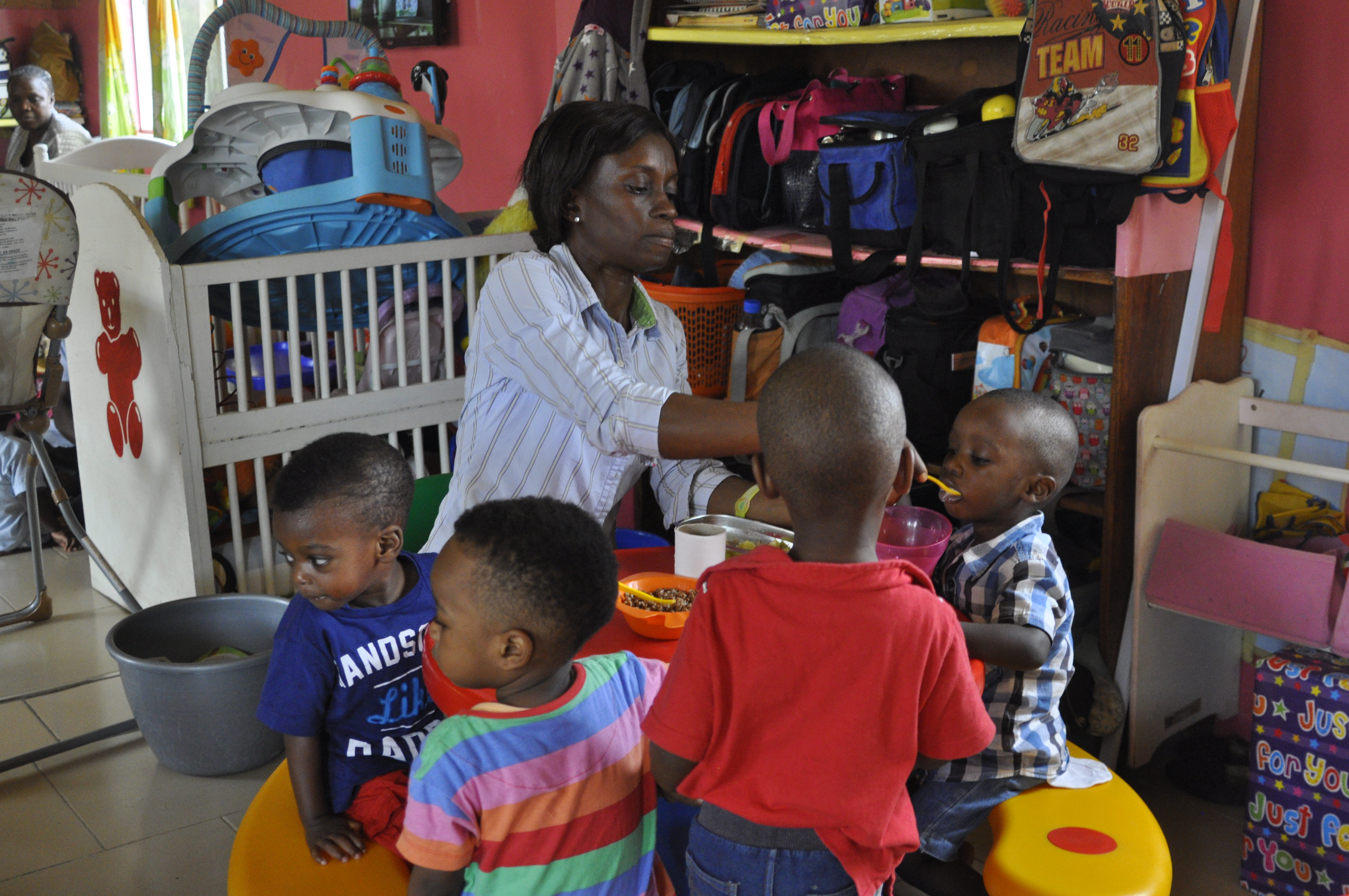
A daycare in Nigeria

Child care, also known as day care, is the care and supervision of one or more children, typically ranging from three months to 10–12 years old. Although most parents spend a significant amount of time caring for their child(ren), childcare typically refers to the care provided by caregivers who are not the child's parents. Childcare is a broad topic that covers a wide spectrum of professionals, institutions, contexts, activities, and social and cultural conventions. Early childcare is an essential and often overlooked component of child development.

A variety of people and organizations can care for children. The child's extended family may also take on this caregiving role. Another form of childcare is center-based childcare. In lieu of familial caregiving, these responsibilities may be given to paid caretakers, orphanages, or foster homes to provide care, housing, and schooling.

Professional caregivers work within the context of center-based care (including crèches, daycare, preschools and schools) or a home-based care (nannies or family daycare). The majority of child care institutions available require child care providers to have extensive training in first aid and be CPR certified. In addition, background checks, drug testing at all centers, and reference verifications are normally a requirement. Child care can consist of advanced learning environments that include early childhood education or elementary education. The objective of the program of daily activities at a child care facility should be to foster age-appropriate learning and social development. In many cases the appropriate child care provider is a teacher or person with educational background in child development, which requires a more focused training aside from the common core skills typical of a child caregiver.

As well as these licensed options, parents may also choose to find their own caregiver or arrange childcare exchanges/swaps with another family.

Access to and quality of childcare have a variety of implications for children, parents and guardians, and families. Child care can have long-term impacts on educational attainment for children. Parents, particularly mothers, see increased labor force attachment when child care is more accessible and affordable. In particular, increased affordable child care opportunities have economic benefits for immigrant communities and communities of color.

== Types ==
=== In the child's home ===
At home, care is typically provided by nannies, au pairs, or friends and family. The child is watched inside the home. Depending on the number of children in the home, the children utilizing in-home care could enjoy the greatest amount of interaction with their caregiver, in turn forming a close bond. There are no required licensing or background checks for in-home care, making parental vigilance essential in choosing an appropriate caregiver. Nanny and au pair services provide certified caregivers and the cost of in-home care is the highest of childcare options per child, though a household with many children may find this the most convenient and affordable option. Many nannies study towards childcare qualifications. This training is intended to teach a carer how to create a safe and stimulating environment for children to enjoy and thrive in. Typically, au pairs or nannies provide more than routine child care, often providing assistance with daily household activities, which include running errands, shopping, doing laundry, fixing meals, and cleaning the house.

The most common way to find a nanny is online on dedicated websites specializing in child care services, or through a nanny agency. Nanny agencies may provide a more thorough check of an applicant's references and run a criminal background check on the candidate. Depending on local prices, a nanny could be cheaper than putting multiple children in a daycare setting full-time. Proponents believe in-home care may provide stability for the child, due to the fact supervision takes place in an already familiar and comfortable setting for the child. Nannies may also provide care for sick children whereas nurseries typically do not. This enables working parents to continue working instead of leaving to pull a sick child out of day care, which may make in home care ideal for parents who work jobs that they cannot leave, such as nurses. Depending on local laws, some carers can be subject to visits from their local childcare regulatory bodies.

=== In the provider's home ===
Family child care providers care for children in the provider's own home. The children could be in a mixed age group with a low adult-to-child ratio. Care can also potentially be personalized and individual. The hours may be more flexible and the provider may offer evening and weekend care for parents who work shifts. The cost of family child care could be significantly lower on average than that of a center.

Child care facilities in the US have the option of becoming accredited. An outside organization is in charge of setting and enforcing this standard. In centers, National Association for the Education of Young Children institutes it. For family child care providers, the National Association of Family Child Care Providers award the credentials.

Licensed or unlicensed home daycare is also referred to as family child care or in-home care. It refers to the care provided to a group of children in the home of a caregiver. State laws differ regarding rules for licensed versus unlicensed care. In Canada, most home daycares are unlicensed, and this is completely lawful. Licensing home daycares in Canada can help greatly with oversight, but at the cost of a large portion of the daycare provider's pay. Family child cares are small in size and also have the benefits of flexible hours, lower costs, accessibility, and cultural compatibility. Home-based providers can give more individualized care. In addition, family care generally has a smaller ratio of adults to children in care, allowing for more interaction between child and provider than would be had at a commercial care center. The providers are able to communicate each day with parents on a personal level and share information about the development of the child. Providers care for multi-aged groups of children, allowing children to remain with one caregiver for many years, which helps children develop a sense of trust and security. Multi-aged settings allow children to learn from one another and allow siblings to stay together. Some family child care providers may offer parents more flexibility with hours of operation such as evening, weekend, overnight, and before and after school care.

=== Center based childcare ===
In a childcare center, teachers focus on the physical and mental developments of their students. In order to have a greater understanding of the student, teachers in centers must incorporate a relationship with their students that benefits their wants and needs while pushing them toward a higher set of values. This type of teaching with a caring relationship will improve a student's moral and incidental learning. (Note: Noddings)

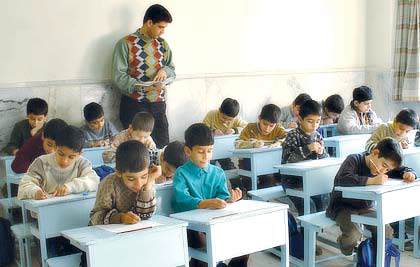
Elementary school teacher dictating students (2003, Tehran, Iran)

Commercial care center also known as daycares, are open for set hours and provide a standardized and regulated system of care for children. Parents may choose from a commercial care center close to their work, and some companies may even offer care at their facilities. Parents may decide the child care facility based on their mission statement and learning objectives they find necessary to be addressed. The child care provider must see how these objectives are most fit for the child and mend them case by case to their specific needs. In setting up activities for these objectives, both indoor and outdoor activities must be taken into account. The parents tend to give their input on what they deem as necessary when the needs of their children may be different. Parents are able to communicate with the staff of these facilities because workers who speak the same native language or language of preference must be available for these conversations.

Active children may thrive in the educational activities provided by a quality commercial care center, but according to the National Center for Early Development and Learning, children from low quality centers may be significantly less advanced in terms of vocabulary and reading skills. Classes are usually largest in this type of care, ratios of children to adult caregivers will vary according to state licensing requirements. Some positive aspects of commercial care are that children may gain a sense of independence, academic achievement, and socialization. Not only is this age crucial for the improvement of their social skills, but also it begins the stages of understanding a classroom setting. Childcare is seen as a reasonable option because it is different from parenting, since it can be seen as more of a routine for the child. Children are placed into centers of socialization and learn many similarities and differences from one another from a very young age. Children are also placed into settings to develop their linguistics and cognitive abilities, which can be measured through observations.

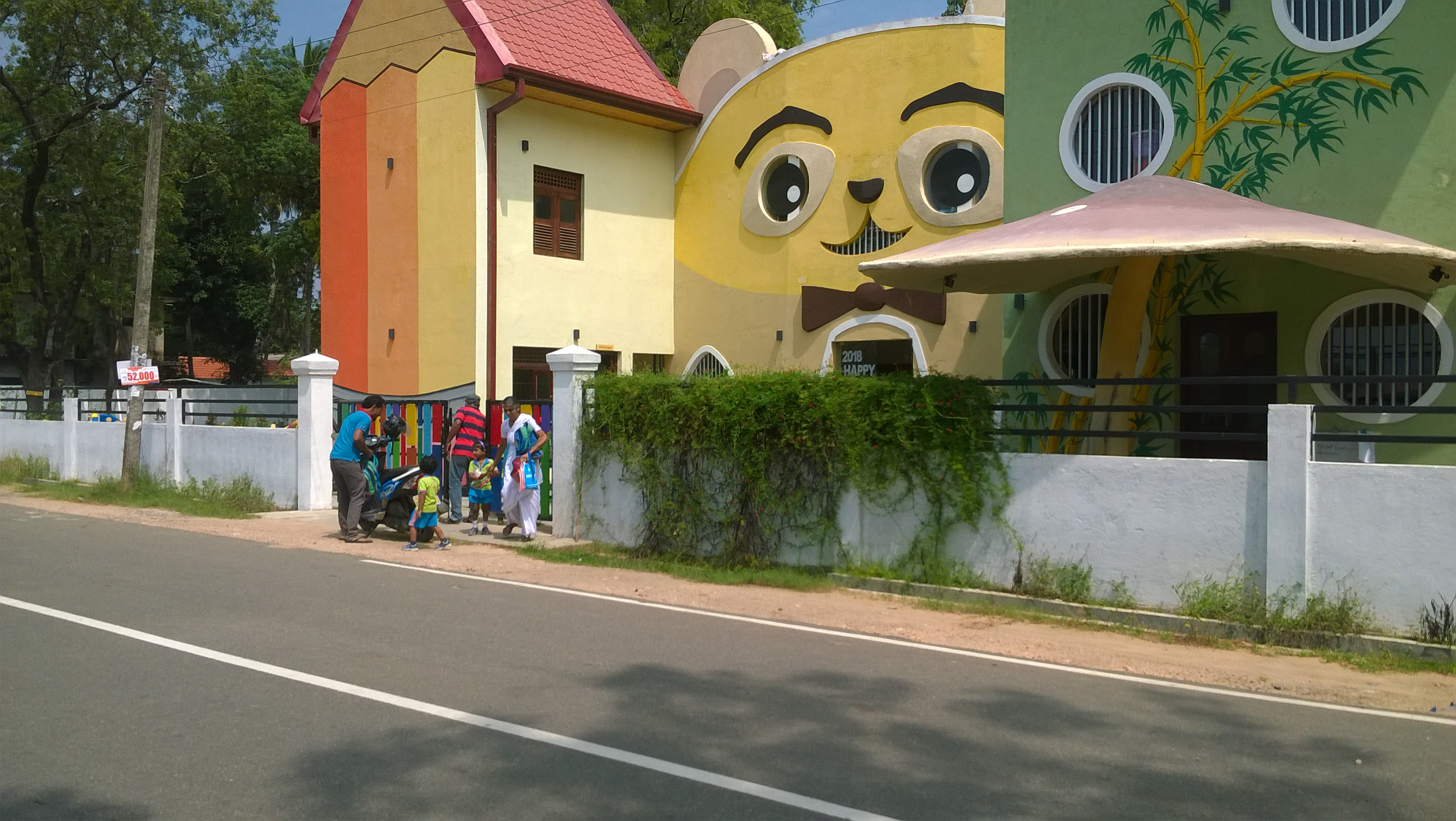
A pre-school in Sri Lanka

Pre-school is often the term used to refer to child care centers that care primarily for 3 and 4-year-old children. Preschool can be based in a center, family child care home or a public school. Older children, in their turn, in most countries are cared in an educational setting, usually a primary school environment. The children are supervised by a teacher who is responsible for their physical, intellectual, emotional and social development. In this regard, most western countries have compulsory education during which the great majority of children are at school starting from five or six years of age. The school will act in loco parentis meaning "in lieu of parent supervision." In many locales, government is responsible for monitoring the quality of care.

==== Staff ====
For all providers, the largest expense is labor. In a 1999 Canadian survey of formal child care centers, labor accounted for 63% of costs and the industry had an average profit of 5.3%. Given the labor-intensive nature of the industry, it is not surprising that the same survey showed little economies of scale between larger and smaller operators.

Local legislation may regulate the operation of daycare centers, affecting staffing requirements. Laws may mandate staffing ratios (for example 6 weeks to 12 months, 1:4; 12 to 18 months, 1:5; 18 to 24 months, 1:9; et and even higher ratios for older children). Legislation may mandate qualifications of supervisors. Staff typically do not require any qualifications but staff under the age of eighteen may require supervision. Typically, once the child reaches the age of twelve, they are no longer covered by daycare legislation and programs for older children may not be regulated.

In Canada, the workforce is predominantly female (95%) and low paid, averaging only 60% of average workforce wage. Many employees are at local minimum wage and are typically paid by the hour rather than salaried. In the United States, "child care worker" is the fifth most female-dominated occupation (95.5% female in 1999). In the US, staffing requirements vary from state to state.

=== Non-profit daycare ===
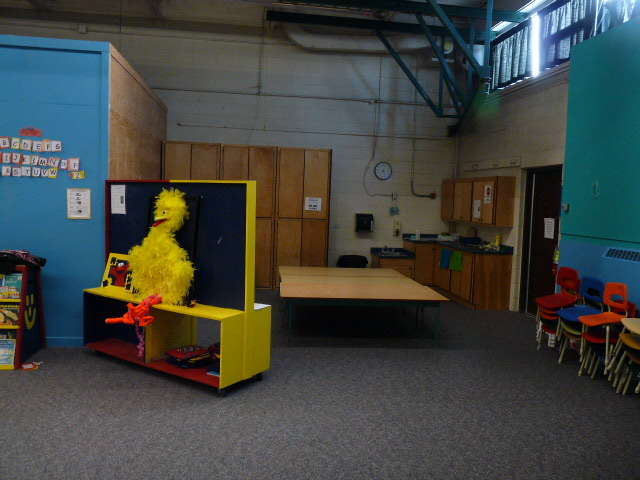
Images inside of Milton District High School in Milton, Ontario, Canada. A daycare in 2009

Considerable research has shown that non-profit child care facilities are much more likely to produce the high quality environments in which children thrive." Not-for-profit organizations are more likely to provide quality childcare to lower income families.

Non-profit day cares have some structural advantages over for-profit operations. They may receive preferential treatment in rent payments, especially if they are affiliated with a church that is otherwise unoccupied during the week, or with a school that has surplus space. Location within a school may have the advantage of coordinated programs with the school and the advantage of a single location for parents who have older school-age children as well.

Local governments, often municipalities, may operate non-profit day care centers. In non-profits, the title of the most senior supervisor is typically "executive director", following the convention of most non-profit organizations.

=== Family child care homes ===
Family child care homes can be operated by a single individual out of their home. In most states, the legal age of 18 is only required. There may be occasions when more than one individual cares for children in a family childcare home. This can be a stay-at-home parent who seeks supplemental income while caring for their own child. There are also many family childcare providers who have chosen this field as a profession. Both state and county agency legislation regulate the ratios (number and ages of children) allowed per family child care home. Some counties have more stringent quality standards that require licensing for family child care homes while other counties require little or no regulations for childcare in individuals' homes. Some family child care homes operate illegally with respect to tax legislation where the care provider does not report fees as income and the parent does not receive a receipt to qualify for childcare tax deductions. However, licensing a family child care home is beneficial for family child care home providers so that they can have access to financial benefits from their state government, or the federal government where they are allowed to accept children from parents who meet the criterion to benefit from the government childcare subsidy funding. Examples of such benefits are: free Professional Development and training courses, Child and adult Care Food Program (which allows eligible childcare and family childcare home providers to claim a portion of costs relating to nutritious meals served to children), and more.

Family childcare may be less expensive than center-based care because of the lower overhead (lower ratios mean less staff are required to maintain regulated ratios. Many family childcare home providers may be certified with the same credentials as center based staff potentially leading to higher level of care.

Franchising of family child care home facilities attempts to bring economies of scale to home daycare. A central operator handles marketing, administration and perhaps some central purchasing while the actual care occurs in individual homes. The central operator may provide training to the individual care providers. Some providers even offer enrichment programs to take the daycare experience to a more educational and professional level.

=== Informal care ===
Informal childcare is a childcare system that utilizes both family and community members. This includes but is not limited to grandparents, siblings, and both children and adult neighbors. This system is inexpensive and many cultures utilize and embrace informal childcare as beneficial to a child's upbringing and education.

Children wring water from clothes at an orphanage, day care and after-school site in Paramaribo, Suriname.

In monetary- and production-based societies (such as in the United States), informal childcare is seen in families who do not have enough funds to finance placing their children in a more expensive child care facility. A study done by Roberta Iversen and Annie Armstrong explains that due to long and irregular working hours of working parents, low- socioeconomic families are more likely to utilize informal childcare. (Note: Iversen, Roberta Rehner, and Annie Laurie Armstrong. 2006. Jobs Aren't Enough: Toward a New Economic Mobility for Low-Income Families. Philadelphia: Temple University Press.) Those low income families are also more apt to work longer hours on an irregular and inflexible schedule, which ultimately makes using a childcare facility, that has regular business hours, unlikely.

==== Children caring for adults ====
Many types of childcare discuss the different ways in which children are cared for by adults or older children. One additional type of child care involves children caring for adults. Children as caretakers are most often seen in developing countries with restricted or hard-to-access medical assistance. Child caretakers are common in families where the parents are affected by HIV/AIDS and other illnesses that might limit their parental functioning.

Developmentally, these child caretakers have shown certain positive associations that affect their future resilience in the face of adversity. Caring for disabled parents raises their sense of responsibility and maturity, increases social and life skills, fosters closer parent-child relationships, and enhances a child's early sense of purpose. Children caring for sick or disabled parents also experience less anxiety surrounding their parents compared to children who have an additional caregiver for their disabled parent. This is because the children understand more about the illness and feel more in control over the situation.

== Effects on child development ==
A variety of researchers have studied the impacts of childcare on child development, and these findings suggest the importance of childcare for development and health outcomes for children.

According to the OECD, investing in high-quality early childhood education and care (ECEC) is a cost-effective way to significantly enhance children’s cognitive, social and emotional development. Skills acquired at an early age provide the foundation for later learning and increase the effectiveness of subsequent educational investments.

=== Childcare centers and development ===
Child development researcher Lian Tong analysed the results from a Haley and Stansbury experiment and concluded that, "parent responsiveness also facilitates cognitive, social, and emotional development and reduces negative emotions in infants". That is, the amount of time that a parent or teacher is willing to spend teaching, listening to, playing with, and exploring with the child the more socially, emotionally, and educationally developed the child will become. Whether that child receives the majority of his or her care at a center or at its house, the biggest factor in deciding what will have the best effect on the child will be those willing to put in the time and effort it takes to properly develop a child's social, physical, and academic skills.

The quality of childcare given by a facility is generally indicated by the center's cost of enrollment. If the center charges more for the service, it will generally provide better care to the children. Centers that charge more for their services can provide quality education, more current resources, and nicer facilities. These are all helpful when trying to educate a child academically. A higher standard for teachers, such as requiring a degree in early childhood education or a degree of the like, has shown to result in improved growth in the development of a child.

Whether at an expensive facility or relatively inexpensive, children who attend daycare facilities tend to develop social skills more quickly than children of the same age group that are reared at home. They communicate better with children of the same age and often try harder to communicate with those that are younger than them, by using patience and taking different approaches at presenting the data. A study done by Erik Dearing proved that negative social behavioral patterns are not directly connected to daycare. By studying a large selection of children from the Norwegian childcare system, he concluded that the number of hours a child spends at a daycare and their behavior do not have a dependent relationship. Though in America, children who attend childcare systems have a higher risk of externalizing the symptoms of negative social behavior, exhibiting these traits can directly correlate with their time spent in the center.

A study that followed up on the randomized Abecedarian Early Intervention Project showed that 5 years of high-quality, targeted cognitively and linguistically stimulating center-based care starting between 3 and 21 weeks of age resulted in significant changes in midlife brain structure in males. MRI scans showed that several brain region and total brain volumes were substantially larger in participants of the child care program than in the control group.

Several studies undertaken in the United States from 2000 to 2007, said that good daycare for non-infants is not harmful. In some cases, good daycare can provide different experiences than parental care does, especially when children reach two years old and are ready to interact with other children. Bad daycare puts the child at physical, emotional and attachment risk. Higher quality care was associated with better outcomes. Children in higher quality childcare had somewhat better language and cognitive development during the first 4 1/2 years of life than those in lower quality care. They were also somewhat more cooperative than those who experienced lower quality care during the first 3 years of life.

The National Institute of Health released a study in March, 2007 after following a group of children through early childhood to the 6th grade. The study found that the children who received a higher quality of childcare scored higher on 5th grade vocabulary tests than the children who had attended childcare of a lower quality. The study also reported that teachers found children from childcare to be "disobedient", fight more frequently, and more argumentative. The study reported the increases in both aggression and vocabulary were small. "The researchers emphasized that the children's behavior was within the normal range and were not considered clinically disordered."

As a matter of social policy, consistent, good daycare, may ensure adequate early childhood education for children of less skilled parents. From a parental perspective, good daycare can complement good parenting.

One 2003 American study appearing in Child Development said that the amount of time spent in daycare before four-and-a-half tended to correspond with the child's tendency to be less likely to get along with others, to be disobedient, and to be aggressive, although still within the normal range.

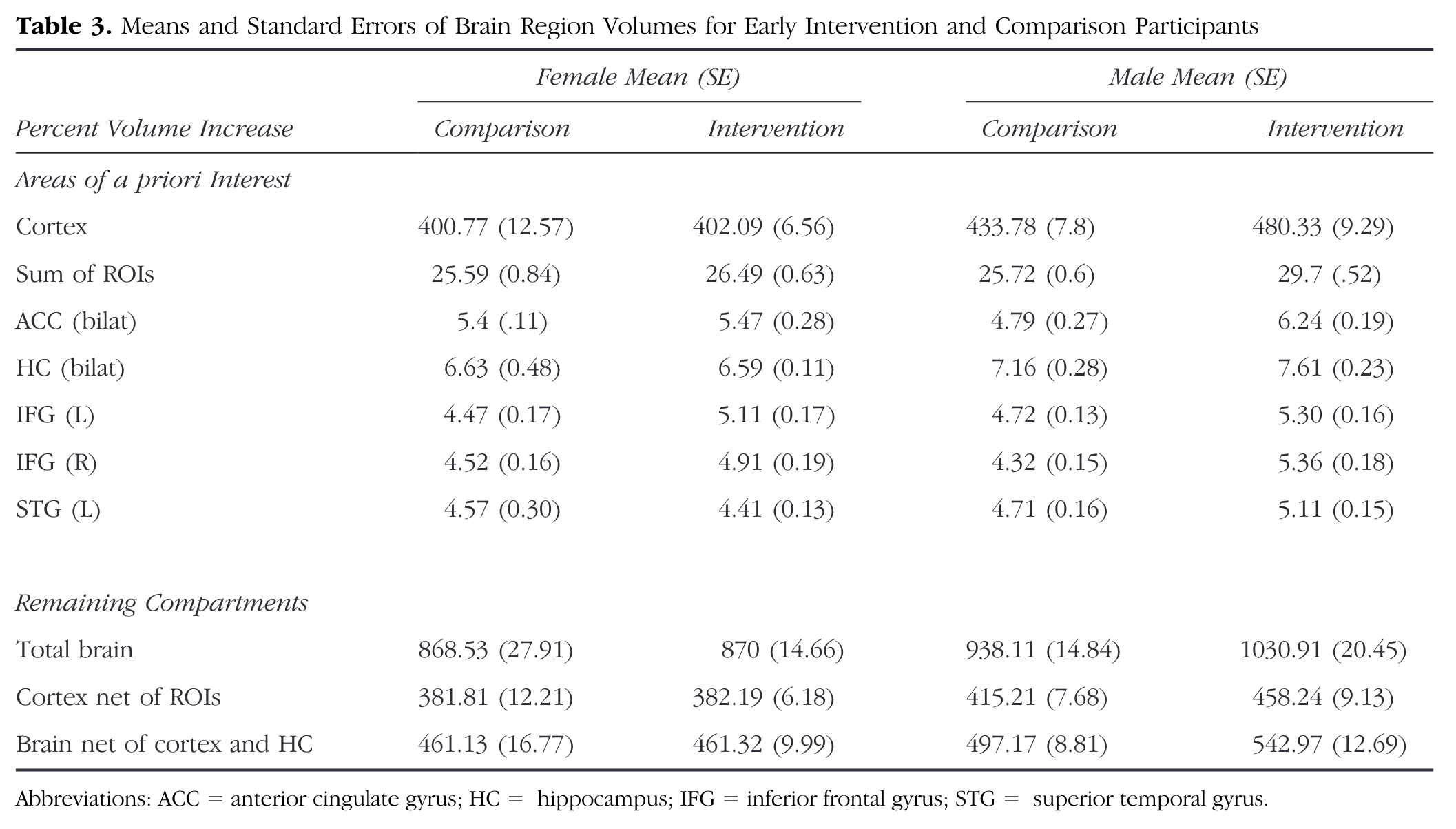
Adult brain volume differences due to a specific child-care program in children of low socioeconomic status.

== Health issues ==
=== Childcare infection ===
Childcare infection is the spread of infection during childcare, typically because of contact among children in daycare or school. This happens when groups of children meet in a childcare environment, and there is an individual with an infectious disease who may then spread it to the entire group. Commonly spread diseases include influenza-like illness and enteric illnesses, such as diarrhea among babies using diapers. Illnesses and diseases may also include ringworm, head lice, and hand, feet, mouth disease. It is uncertain how these diseases spread, but hand washing reduces some risk of transmission and increasing hygiene in other ways also reduces risk of infection.

Due to social pressure, parents of sick children in childcare may be willing to give unnecessary medical care to their children when advised to do so by childcare workers and even if it is against the advice of health care providers. In particular, children in childcare are more likely to take antibiotics than children outside of childcare.

== History ==
According to Chris Knight:

... the ancestors of extant humans comprised a small population dwelling somewhere in sub-Saharan Africa. Although disagreements abound, some genetic studies indicate that their population size at one point may have resembled that of a modern endangered species, possibly no more numerous than today's mountain gorillas. What happened next was extraordinary. The population exploded, Homo sapiens soon colonising the globe. Population expansion on such a scale is inconsistent with female tolerance of infanticide, harassment, or the heavy costs to mothers of male philandering and double standards. If unusually large numbers of unusually large-brained offspring were being successfully raised to maturity, the quality of childcare must have been exceptional. We know what the optimal solution would have been. There can be no doubt that mothers would have done best by taking advantage of every available childcare resource.

Plato, according to Elaine Hoffman Baruch, around 394 B.C., argued that a system of child care would free women to participate in society. Among the early English authors to devote a book to child care in the modern sense was Elizabeth Dawbarn (The Rights of Infants, or... Nursing of Infants, 1805).

The first crèche was opened by Firmin Marbeau on 14 November 1844 in Paris, The Société des Crèches was recognized by the French government in 1869. Originating in Europe in the late 18th and early 19th century, day cares were established in the United States by private charities in the 1850s, such as the Charity Organization Society founded by Ansley Wilcox. The Fitch Creche in Buffalo, New York was known as the first day center for working mothers in the United States. Another at that time was the New York Day Nursery in 1854.

In English-speaking and other conservative countries, the vast majority of childcare is still performed by the parents, in-house nannies or through informal arrangements with relatives, neighbors or friends, but most children are in daycare centers for most of the day in Nordic Countries, for example. Child care in the child's own home is traditionally provided by a nanny or au pair, or by extended family members including grandparents, aunts and uncles. Child care is provided in nurseries or crèches or by a nanny or family child care provider caring for children in their own homes. It can also take on a more formal structure, with education, child development, discipline and even preschool education falling into the fold of services.

The day care industry is a continuum from personal parental care to large, regulated institutions. Some childminders care for children from several families at the same time, either in their own home (commonly known as "family day care" in Australia) or in a specialized child care facility. Some employers provide nursery provisions for their employees at or near the place of employment. (Note: Day care in Longman Dictionary of Contemporary English daycare or day care in the American Heritage Dictionary child day care is the care of a child during the day by a person other than the child's legal guardians, typically performed by someone outside the child's immediate family. Day care is typically an ongoing service during specific periods, such as the parents' time at work. The service is known as day care or childcare Oxford Dictionaries in the United Kingdom, North America, and Australia and as crèche in Ireland and New Zealand. According to Oxford Living Dictionaries, child care in two words can in addition have the broader meaning of the care of a child by anyone, including the parents,Oxford Dictionaries but US dictionaries do not record that spelling or meaning. in Random House Dictionary, The American Heritage Dictionary, Merriam-Webster)

For-profit day care corporations often exist where the market is sufficiently large or there are government subsidies.

Independent studies suggest that good daycare is not harmful. In some cases, good daycare can provide different experiences than parental care does, especially when children reach two and are ready to interact with other children. Children in higher quality childcare had somewhat better language and cognitive development during the first 4 1/2 years of life than those in lower quality care.

== Cultural differences ==
Childcare varies dramatically across cultures. While many global communities prefer children aged 7–10 for designated caregiving responsibilities, children no younger than 12 are preferred in the Western world, where paid childcare is common. For example, very young children in Zaire regularly use machetes safely and skillfully while American middle-class adults do not trust their young children with knives. Child development is not just biological or psychological—it is also a cultural process and it is not universal. In countries where children are given more responsibility the adults serve as "occasional supervisors", and children take pride in their responsibilities.

Therefore, an important aspect of childcare is considering the cultural differences and accepted behaviors in differing households. Children should be able to retain their cultural tradition and norms, while also being exposed to other cultures.

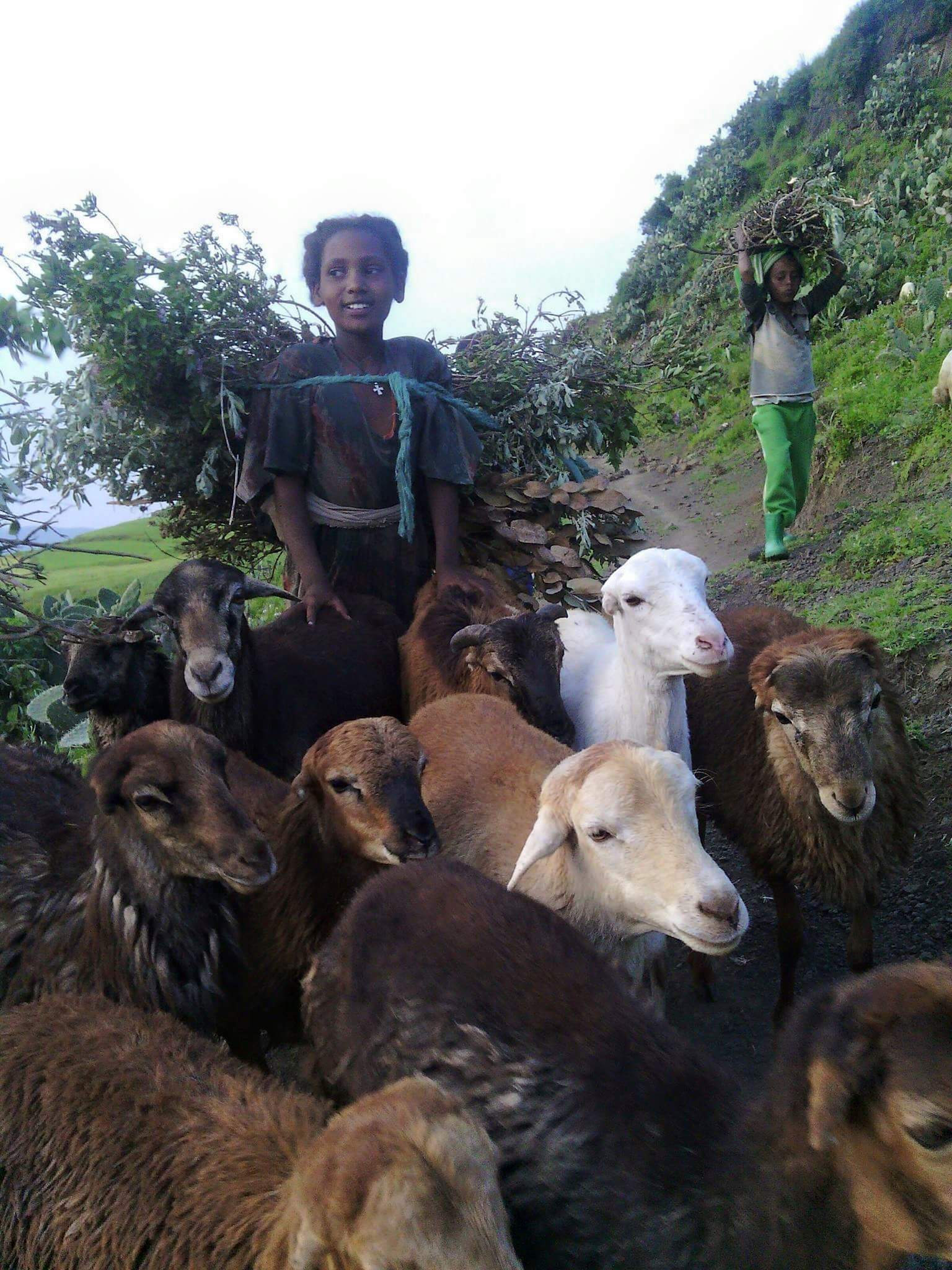
Children carrying firewood and tending sheep in Ethiopia

In their 1977 article, Thomas S. Weisner and Ronald G. Gallimore said that by 1969 there had been no cross-cultural work reference to caretaking of children by anyone other than parents published in The Handbook of Socialization Theory and Research included in its 1,182 pages virtually no reference to caretaking of children by anyone other than parents.reported on Their 1977 article reported on their study of over a hundred countries. They found that in agricultural/horticultural societies where work is done to provide sustenance for the community, siblings and similar-aged children are responsible for younger children. Other factors of childcare that vary cross-culturally are the relative ages of both caretaker and child, parental expectations, demands of the child, culturally-varied conceptions of children's maturity, and factors affecting demographic makeup. They said that there are discrepancies attributed to the homestead and household environments. That is, the type of work performed by adult caretakers in a given community strongly influence the type of childcare used. Weisner said that children that receive informal care may or may not receive the same educational and preparatory regimens as those in a center- or home-based center often do. In many situations, there will be no curriculum or teaching schedule, and instead learning occurs informally as a direct result of the caretaker and charge's interactions. Learning and development occur differently for every individual. Different periods of a child's growth are known to affect the caretaking styles associated with them, from the care of an infant to that of an adolescent.

Other influences on caretaking include the expectations of the three parties involved- the parents, caretakers, and children. Many agricultural communities highly value sibling- and peer- caretaking. Accounts from the Idakho tribe in Kenya portray infants being left to the care and guidance of other relatively young children in the community with adults and other tribe members merely within shouting distance should a problem arise. The same pattern of caregiving is seen in the Kikuyu people in Kenya, where mothers in the horticultural society are often away working, which relies on siblings, cousins, and neighbors to care for children as young as 4 months old. In most cases, children are taken care of by their parents, legal guardians, or siblings. In some cases, it is also seen that children care for other children. This informal care includes verbal direction and other explicit training regarding the child's behavior, and is often as simple as "keeping an eye out" for younger siblings.

Care given by unpaid providers in an informal setting affects multiple developmental and psychological dimensions in children. Whether the providers are the child's siblings or a member of the family/community, research dictates this type of care influences factors such as sense achievement, affiliation, conformity, and individual interests. More specifically, further research indicates that children being cared for by siblings or similarly aged children (a trend more commonly seen in agriculturally-based cultural communities) have certain psychological and developmental effects on those being cared for. These effects include but are not limited to: mother-child attachment, emergence of childhood developmental stages, formation of playgroups, development of social responsibility, sex differences, personality differences, cognition, and motivation and performance in the classroom.

== Cost ==
The cost of raising a child increases with income of parents due to opportunity cost of time spent on child care. Child benefits and child support which increase with income can balance these costs. The positive externalities of children on pay-as-you-go pensions can fund child care.

According to the OECD, affordable and reliable childcare, particularly for children under the age of three, is important for enabling mothers—especially those from low-income or single-parent families—to participate fully in the labour market. In particular, the availability, intensity, reliability and affordability of ECEC play an important role in engaging women full time in the labour market. However, the costs and limited availability of ECEC still pose significant barriers in many countries. In September 2026, U.S. families spent an average of 8% of their monthly income on childcare, while nearly 8% were paying more than $2,000 a month, more than twice the share reported three years earlier.

A study of Luxembourg examined the effects of a reform that substantially increased the number of subsidized childcare places. Among mothers with a youngest child under 13, employment rose by 4–7 percentage points and average working hours by 2–3 hours per week. The increase reflected both new labour market entry and longer hours among those already employed, with the strongest effects for mothers of the youngest children. The findings highlight the role of universal and heavily subsidized childcare in supporting maternal employment and align with evidence from other OECD countries.

After Québec instituted universal low-fee childcare, nearly 70,000 more women entered the labor force, an increase of 3.8 percentage points. The study further found that the program increased Quebec's GDP by 1.7%, and that this increased labour force participation rate led to reduced welfare payments and increased tax revenue for the government, concluding that "each $100 of daycare subsidy paid out by the Quebec government generated a return of $104 for itself and a windfall of $43 for the federal government."

== Access ==
The availability of child care, whether with other family members or professional care, affects the ability of parents to work. This includes both single parents and families where both parents need or want to earn money. Many governments in higher-income countries provide subsidies for child care programs for the benefit of low-income families or parents in general. There is political debate over whether the government should provide universal child care services in the United States, where there are few subsidies. Related debates include those over universal preschool and paid family leave.

=== Unpaid childcare ===
Caregivers nurture and develop their children into being functional members of society. For centuries it has been assumed that women will stay home and take care of the children while their husbands go out and work. In most cases, the husbands get all the credit for providing for the family. However, the homemaker deserves credit for care work. Caregivers do not receive monetary compensation and, because they spend a significant amount of time raising their children, must pay a 'care-penalty' (the opportunity costs in both time and money that one pays for doing care work for a family member). Instead of taking care of a family member, a caregiver could spend time working or performing leisure activities. Care penalties are not strictly related to childcare – they can also refer to taking care of a sick family member, babysitting a younger sibling, or taking an elderly family member on errands such as grocery shopping or doctor's appointments.

Studies have been done to get an annual salary estimate for a female caregiver. One survey suggested that the value of a mother's work, if she were paid the average wage for each task she performs in running the household and caring for her children, is $117,867 per year. The reason for the high salary is because mothers typically perform about 10 different job functions throughout the week. Some of these job functions are poorly paid, including cleaning, driving, caring for children, and washing laundry, but others, especially financial and managerial tasks that the survey equated with being the chief executive officer of a company, are highly paid. Neither a nanny nor a housekeeper makes nearly as much money, and almost all of these tasks except direct child care also have to be done by non-parents. The value of unpaid childcare is also an important figure in various legal entities. Expert witnesses (most often economists) are occasionally brought into court cases to give estimates on the value of unpaid labor. By giving estimation, the plaintiff or defendant can be fairly compensated for their labor.

Developmental benefits are also seen for older siblings or relatives tasked to care for younger children. For example, children with siblings are more likely to exhibit prosocial behaviors (such as the ability to take another's perspective or sharing with others) than children without siblings. Additionally, sibling caretakers have the opportunity to develop deeper communication skills as they teach younger siblings to participate in everyday tasks.

=== Business ===
The day care industry is a continuum from personal parental care to large, regulated institutions.

The vast majority of childcare is still performed by the parents, in-house nanny or through informal arrangements with relatives, neighbors or friends. For example, in Canada, among two parent families with at least one working parent, 62% of parents handle the childcare themselves, 32% have other in-home care (nannies, relatives, neighbours or friends) and only 6.5% use a formal day care center.

However, for-profit day care corporations often exist where the market is sufficiently large or there are government subsidies. For instance, in North America, KinderCare Learning Centers, one of the largest of such companies, has approximately 1,600 centers located in 39 states and the District of Columbia. Bright Horizons Family Solutions another of the largest has over 600 daycare centers. Similarly the Australian government's childcare subsidy has allowed the creation of a large private-sector industry in that country.

Another factor favoring large corporate daycares is the existence of childcare facilities in the workplace. Large corporations will not handle this employee benefit directly themselves and will seek out large corporate providers to manage their corporate daycares. Most smaller, for-profit daycares operate out of a single location.

In general, the geographic limitations and the diversity in type of daycare providers make child daycare a highly fragmented industry. The largest providers own only a very small share of the market. This leads to frustration for parents who are attempting to find quality child daycare, with 87% of them describing the traditional search for child daycare as "difficult and frustrating".

==== Standards and requirements ====
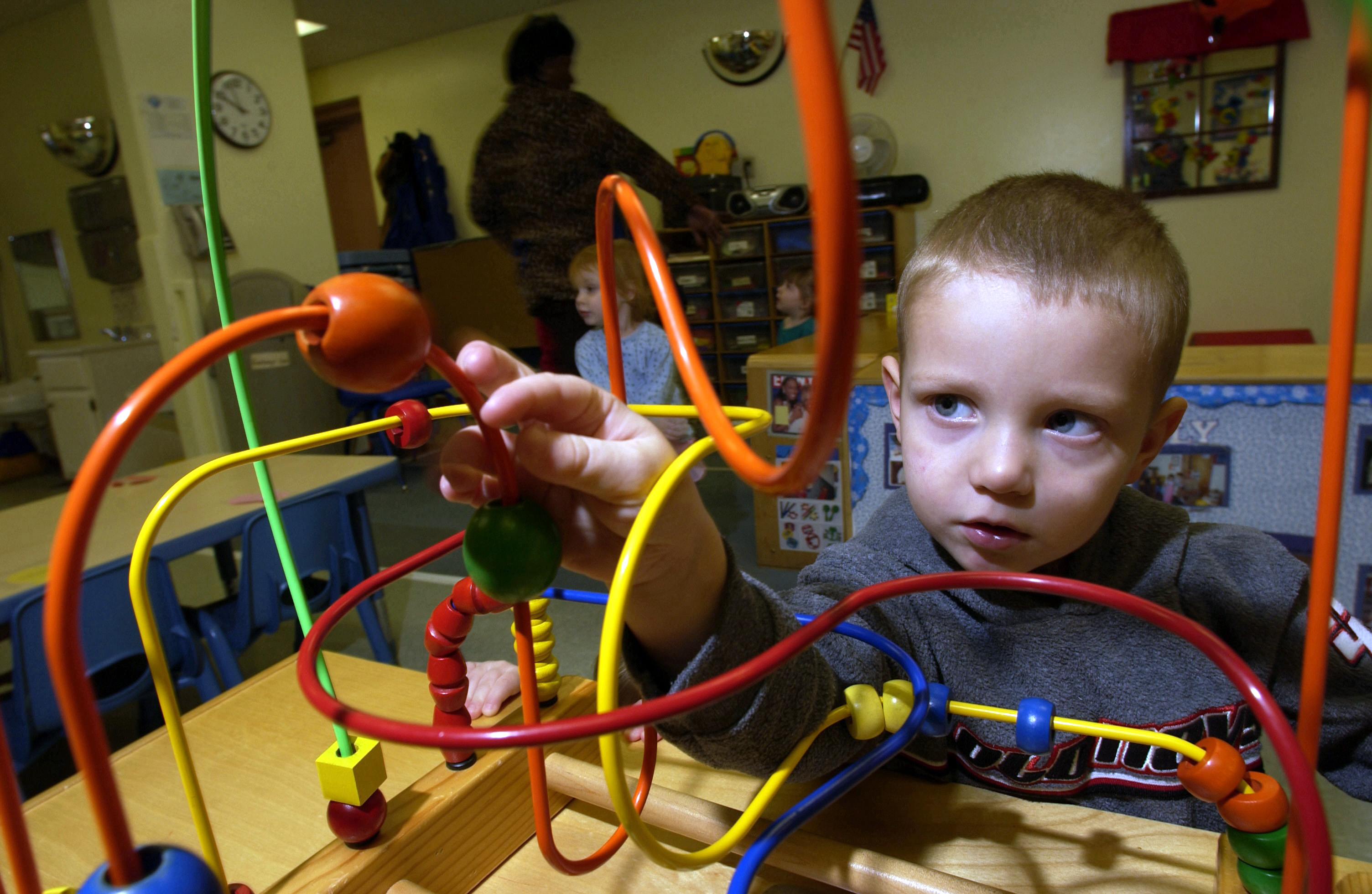
A child playing with a toy in a daycare

Some jurisdictions require licensing or certification. Parents may also turn to independent rating services or rely on recommendations and referrals. Some places develop voluntary quality networks; for example, in Australia, most childcare services are part of a national Quality Assurance system. Some places require caregivers to take classes in pediatric CPR and first aid. Most countries have laws relating to childcare, which seek to keep children safe and prevent and punish child abuse. Such laws may add cost and complexity to childcare provision and may provide tools to help ensure quality childcare. Regulations tend to reduce the supply of child care.

Additionally, legislation typically defines what constitutes daycare (e.g., so as to not regulate individual babysitters). It may specify details of the physical facilities (washroom, eating, sleeping, lighting levels, etc.). The minimum window space may be such that it precludes day cares from being in a basement. It may specify the minimum floor space per child (for example, 2.8 square metres) and the maximum number of children per room (for example, 24). It may mandate minimum outdoor time (for example, 2 hours for programs lasting 6 hours or longer). Legislation may mandate qualifications of supervisors. Staff typically do not require any qualifications but staff under the age of eighteen may require supervision. Some legislation also establishes rating systems, the number and condition of various toys, and documents to be maintained. Typically, once children reach the age of twelve, they are no longer covered by daycare legislation and programs for older children may not be regulated.

Legislation may mandate staffing ratios (for example, 6 weeks to 12 months, 1:4; 12 to 18 months, 1:5; 18 to 24 months, 1:9; etc.). The caregiver-to-child ratio is one factor indicative of quality of care. Ratios vary greatly by location and by daycare center. Potential consequences of a caregiver-child ratio which is too high could be very serious. However, many states allow a higher numbers of toddlers to caregivers and some centers do not comply consistently. For example, within the US: Pennsylvania, ages 1–3, 1 teacher to 5 children; Missouri: age 2, 1 teacher to 8 children; North Carolina: 1 teacher to 10 children.

Many organizations in the developed world campaign for free or subsidized childcare for all. Others campaign for tax breaks or allowances to provide parents a non-finance driven choice. Many of the free or subsidized childcare programs in the United States are also Child Development programs, or afterschool programs, which hire certified teachers to teach the children while they are in their care. There are often local industry associations that lobby governments on childcare policy, promote the industry to the public or help parents choose the right daycare provider.

In the United States, childcare in regulated commercial or family childcare home setting is administered or led by teachers who may have a Child Development Associate or higher credentials. These higher credentials include Associate, Bachelor, and even master's degrees in the field of Early Childhood Education (ECE). Although childcare professionals may obtain a degree, many states require that they attend workshops yearly to upgrade their knowledge and skill levels. Many day cares require a teacher to obtain a certain amount of training. For example, Texas requires a minimum of 25 hours a year, and a first-year teacher is required to have 50 hours.

=== Inequities ===
There are links between the income, education, and importance of consistency and the well-being of the child, to the parents, and the development of their child. Higher educated parents place more importance on the education of their children than the parents who do not have a college degree or have not graduated from high school. Likewise, parents who have a higher income level are more willing to part with their money to purchase a private tutor or nanny to assist the parent in the education of their child. They also tend to stress the importance of being socially inept. The first few years of a child's life are important to form a basis for good education, morality, self-discipline and social integration. Consistency of approach, skills and qualifications of caregivers have been shown in many studies to improve the chances of a child reaching his or her full potential. Child care in much of western society is currently in crisis: there are not enough daycare spots, the cost for most parents is beyond their means, and child care staff are grossly underpaid. Starting wages for Early Childcare Educators start at $11 or $12, causing a high turnover rate, and decreases the likelihood of potentially safe, effective, and loving child care providers from even entering the field. For preschool teachers the average salary is about $28,570. According to a survey done by HiMama, 68% of for-profit child care organizations ranked 'Labor' as their top risk and 65% ranked 'Talent and Recruitment' as their top priority for 2017.

Another consideration in the inequities in childcare is who is providing childcare disproportionately, in some countries the task has fallen onto Black and immigrant women.

== By country ==
=== Australia ===
Australia has a large childcare industry, but in many locations (especially in inner-city suburbs of large cities and in rural areas), the availability is limited and the waiting periods can be up to several years. The Australian Government's Child Care Subsidy(CCS) scheme provides assistance with child care costs, but this still leaves many families with a large out of pocket expense. The median weekly cost of center-based long day care in 2013 was approximately A$364 which puts it out of the reach of lower income earners.

Regulation is governed by the Australian Children's Education & Care Quality Authority (ACECQA), a federal government body, which acts as a central body for the state bodies. As of 2021, minimum supervision ratios of educators to children were 1:4 for infants, 1:5 for 2–3 years old (except for VIC – 1:4), 1:10 for preschoolers in NSW, TAS and WA, and 1:11 for preschoolers in ACT, NT, QLD, SA and VIC.

All childcare workers must have, or be undertaking, the minimum Certificate III in Children's Services in order to work in a center (Recognition of Prior Learning is available to help qualify staff with many years experience, but no qualifications). (Common more advanced qualifications are 'Diploma of Children's Services' and an Early Childhood Education degree).

Rules differ between states regarding family day care in Australia. To start a Family Day Care business in Victoria, an educator should be either have a Certificate III in Children's Services or be actively working towards the same. Additionally, a current police check, current first aid training and insurance (specifically for family day care) are necessary for starting a family day care. The house should be safe for children. A group of 15 educators works under one Supervisor who must have a Diploma in Children's Services.

In Australia, Nannies are also a viable childcare option for many families, although they do not currently reap the benefits of the Government Child Care Subsidy. Nannies often offer many styles of services, including casual and permanent nannies, as well as au pairs and overnight nannies.

=== Canada ===
Canada offers both private and subsidized daycare centres. Some shortages of subsidized openings can lengthen the time needed to find a suitable childcare provider. To counter this, government or private enterprises sometimes enable parents to look for available spaces online.

A 2008 article in The Star said that not-for-profits are much more likely to produce the high quality environments in which children thrive."

Local governments, often municipalities, may operate non-profit day care centres.

For all providers, the largest expense is labour. Local legislation may regulate the operation of daycare centres, affecting staffing requirements. In Canada, the workforce is predominantly female (95%) and low paid, averaging only 60% of average workforce wage. Some jurisdictions require licensing or certification. Legislation may specify details of the physical facilities (washroom, eating, sleeping, lighting levels, etc.).

In 2021, in reflection on the circumstances of the COVID-19 pandemic, the Canadian government reflected upon the benefits and values of child care on child development and economic growth. As such, the government made it a goal to decrease the cost of child care. This policy change is reflected in the 2021 Canadian budget, which invests up to $8.3 billion for child care services for early learning and for indigenous communities.

=== Denmark ===
In Denmark most daycares accept children ranging from 6 months old to three years old. 91.2% of one- and two-year-old children are enrolled in different types of daycare institutions. Most of these are managed by a municipality and mostly government funded. The different types of institutions ranges from separate day-care institutions (Vuggestue), kindergartens with a daycare department (Integrerede institutioner) and in-home day-care (Dagpleje).

The daycares are play-based focusing on the children's perspective and involvement in day-to-day life. The day-cares are staffed by trained social educators or pedagogues (pædagog).

The Danish government claims that most families in Denmark take advantage of the guaranteed access to center-based child care in the county. These institutions for child care in Denmark include those run by municipalities and some private facilities. Some facilities are not centered in a child care facility but in the home of a woman who is not a professional child care administrator. Certain scholars and individuals accredit the near universal participation in the Danish child care system as a model that other countries should follow in order to increase educational attainment and equality. Danish policies that support families also include parental leave programs.

=== France ===
France couples public child care services with private and family child care services. These services are part of the 3.6% of the French GDP spent on family policies. Services in France are offered to people with full-time French residence and people whose children are vaccinated.

=== Germany ===
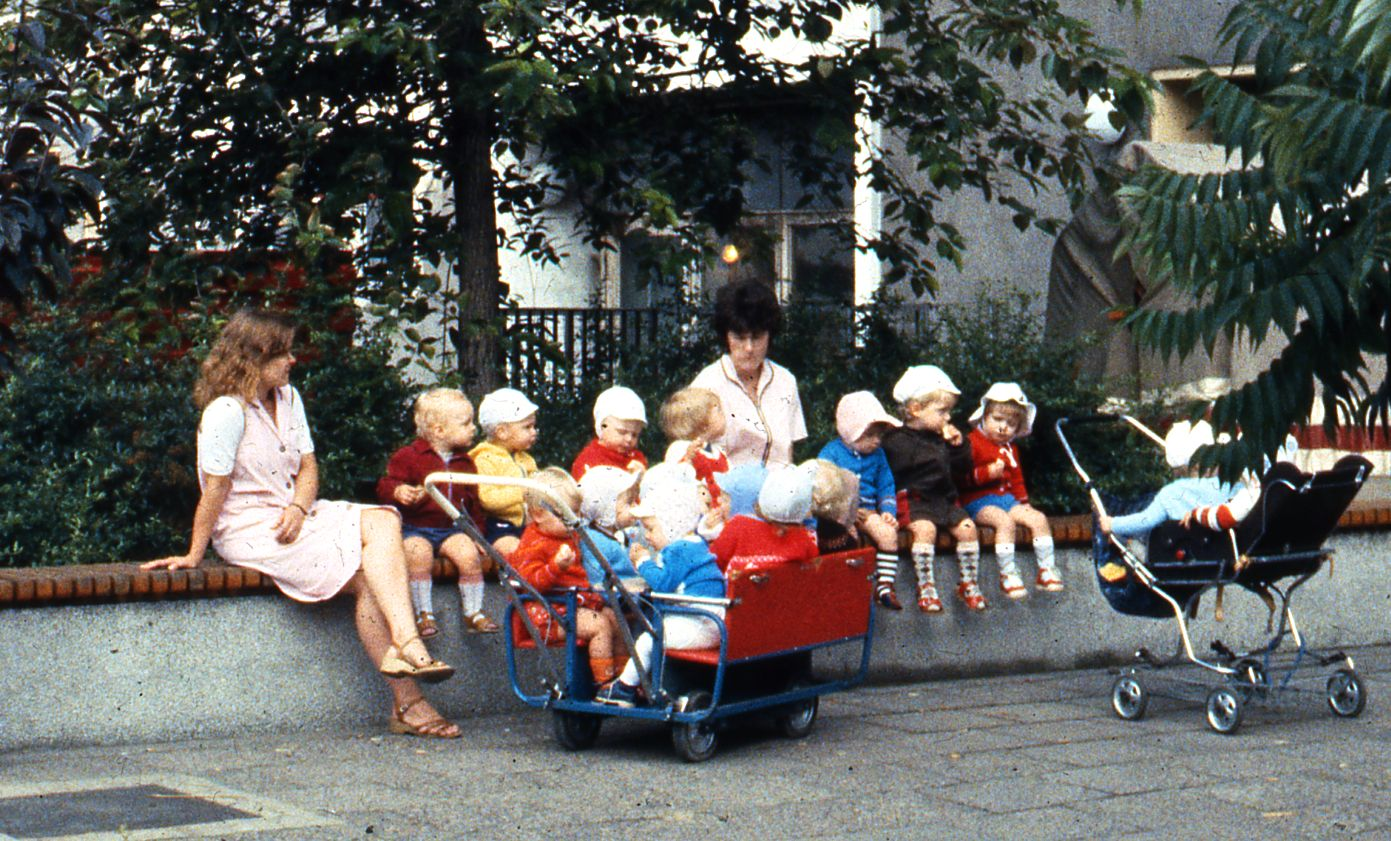
A group of East Berlin children, with their caretakers, 1984

In Germany, preschool education is the domain of the Kindertagesstätte (literally "children's day site", often shortened to Kita or KITA), which is usually divided into the Kinderkrippe (crèche) for toddlers (age up to three years) and the Kindergarten for children who are older than three years and before school. Children in their last Kindergarten year may be grouped into a Vorschule ("preschool") and given special pedagogic attention; special preschool institutions comparable to the US-American kindergarten are the exception.

Kitas are typically run by public (i.e., communal) and "free" carriers (such as the churches, other religious organizations, social organizations with a background in the trade unions, and profit-orientated corporations), and subsidized by the states (Länder). In this case, the care is open to the general public—e.g., a Protestant or Muslim child may claim a place in a Kita run by the catholic church.

Preschool education, unlike school and university, is not in the exclusive domain of the states. The federal government regulates daycare through the Kinder- und Jugendhilfegesetz (KJHG), which stipulates a legal claim to daycare:

- for children over the age of three and before school (i.e., kindergarten; this law became effective in 1996)
- for children under the age of three and before Kindergarten (i.e., Kinderkrippe; this law becomes effective 1 August 2013)

Alternative daycare can be provided through Tagespflegepersonen (usually Tagesmütter, "day mothers"), i.e., stay-at-home parents who provide commercial daycare to other children. This form of daycare is also federally regulated through the KJHG.

Preschool education (Frühpädagogik) is increasingly seen as an integral part of education as a whole; several states, such as Bavaria have released detailed educational plans for daycare carriers who claim state subsidies. "Early pedagogics" has increasingly moved into the academic domain, with an increasing number of staff being trained at universities of applied science (Fachhochschulen) and regular universities. Non-academic personnel in daycare facilities have usually attended specialized schools for several years. In the state of Bavaria for example, daycare assistants (Kinderpfleger) will have attended school for two years and daycare teachers (Erzieher) for three years with an additional two-year internship.

=== India ===
India has a system of universal childcare which is free and provided by the state through the Integrated Child Development Services. It provides food, preschool education, primary healthcare, immunization, contraceptive counselling, health check-up and referral services to children under 6 years of age and their mothers. For nutritional purposes ICDS provides 500 kilocalories (with 12–15 gm grams of protein) every day to every child below 6 years of age. For adolescent girls it is up to 500 kilo calories with up to 25 grams of protein every day. The services of Immunisation, Health Check-up and Referral Services are delivered through Public Health Infrastructure under the Ministry of Health and Family Welfare. During the 2018–19 fiscal year, free childcare cost the state ₹28,335 crore (US$3.0 billion). Additionally, private childcare services also exist in the country for wealthier families.

In 2008, the GOI adopted the World Health Organization standards for measuring and monitoring child growth and development, both for the ICDS and the National Rural Health Mission (NRHM). Since 1997, WHO has conducted an extensive study of six developing nations to develop these standards. They are known as the New WHO Child Growth Standard and measure the physical growth, nutritional status, and motor development of children from birth to 5 years of age. Despite increasing funding over the past three decades, the ICDS fell short of its stated objectives and still faces a number of challenges. Also, though it has widespread coverage, operational gaps mean that service delivery is not consistent in quality and quantity across the country. The World Bank has highlighted certain key shortcomings of the programme including the inability to target girl child improvements, the participation of wealthier children more than the poorer children, and the lowest level of funding for the poorest and most undernourished states of India. Additionally, private childcare services also exist in the country for wealthier families.

=== Japan ===
Licensed childcare in Japan falls under the jurisdiction of Ministry of Health, Labour and Welfare, but each licensed daycare facilities are run by private or public organizations, which are licensed and inspected by the local prefectural, ordinance city, or core city governments.

Japan has a universal childcare system and childcare is free or relatively affordable as the national government provides subsidies and a framework for working families. Based on household incomes and the number of children in need of childcare, local municipal governments set fee schedules for childcare for children under the age of 2. The second child who needs care receives a 50% discount, and the third child or low-income households do not pay any fees. Licensed childcare for ages 3 to 5 is free for a single parent or when both parents are working. The national government only covers the cost of the core childcare program and does not cover the cost of transportation, special activities, meals or snacks, although meals and snacks are partially covered for low-income households.

Parents apply to licensed childcare in Japan through a single point of access by visiting their local municipal government, which handles all the payments and manages the master waiting list for the neighbourhood. The waiting list is not on a first-come, first-served basis but rather a priority list based on the points system. A child from single-parent families, parents with illness or disabilities, and low-income households is typically prioritized over children from other households.

Because of the popularity for licensed childcare and the increasing number of women in the workforce, many children are placed on a waiting list. This is one of the biggest social problems in Japan, known as "taiki jidō problem" (待機児童問題; lit. ''standby children problem'') in larger cities.

As of April 2019, Okinawa had the highest percentage of children on the waitlist at 2.8% of all the applicants (1,702 children), while Tokyo had the largest number of children on the waitlist at 3,690 children (1.19% of applicants). On a nationwide scale, the average percentage of children placed on the waitlist was 0.6% and there was an excess supply of licensed childcare, with 2,679,651 children filling 2,888,159 spots available throughout Japan. Of all children on the waitlist, 63% of applicants resided in larger cities.

The number of taiki jidō may not represent the actual numbers as those parents who can afford may choose unlicensed childcare or baby sitters due to a lack of space in the licensed childcare system. Although unlicensed childcare and babysitters are also eligible for government subsidies, a parent must apply with local municipal government for funding and the maximum funding is capped at 37,000 yen per month.

=== Mexico ===
In Mexico, President Felipe Calderón created a Social Program named "Programa de Estancias Infantiles" that included more than 8,000 daycare spaces for children between 1 and 3.11 years old. This program subsidizes mothers that work and study and also single fathers in a vulnerable situation. It has a great success having more than 125,000 children over the country. This is regulated by the Social Development Minister (Secretaría de Desarrollo Social).

Childcare has been on the rise in Mexico due to the increasing interest it has within the people and the effect it has on the government. This is due to the rise of urban areas in developing countries and the need to keep up with the economic development. There has always been many child care services available but due to the high costs, they were mainly unavailable for the low income families. Childcare became a hot topic of discussion when more women were joining the workforce and the debate of how this would affect how the children would be raised. Another topic of debate is how would the women pay for these expensive services while working minimum wage jobs or having limited times they could work, so the idea of subsidies arose. In specific to the child, the topic of "street children", how and where children should grow up, was debated, and if they should be allowed to be considered part of the street instead of a particular home. This issue was of great debate because it not only affects the child but also the community the child is in, since they usually seek out public spaces for shelter, food and play. Childcare is generally broken into three general categories such as governmental institutions, religious organizations, and independent agencies (such as NGOS). All of these take on the same objectives which are "containment, paternalist cure approach and street education".

The creation of childcare programs in Mexico is quite different from others because it focuses on the "defeminization of labor and the defamilization of care". Female participation is a goal that the government has so it set in place many policies and modes to achieve this. The creation of a successful program of child care has been sought out and many different aspects have been changed over the years but it can be seen that there is an increase in early childhood education and care services (ECEC). ECEC services can be broken down into three different time periods and models which were implemented. The first would be in the 1970s when the Institute for Social Security focuses on covering children for mothers who were covered by Social Security services. This caused a huge gap in the children that could be covered due to the fairly large number of women working in the informal sector and being denied these services. The second stage would be in the early 2000s when the Ministry of Public Education made preschool mandatory for all children from ages 3 to 5. This was useful in theory because all of the children in this age range would be cared for, but in reality caused a strain in the amount of time that the parents had to go and work or dedicate their time elsewhere. The last stage would be in 2007 when the Ministry of Social Development created a childcare program in which was focuses on helping out children and mothers who were not covered by the social security services. This was successful since it targeted low income families specifically. For families to be eligible for this service the mothers had to be working or searching for a job, the income was taken into consideration in comparison to that of minimum wage, and that they did not have any other access to services. Women's participation in the workforce and be directly tied to the availability of childcare services and how it would affect their household.

The program that was created in 2007 became known as the Federal Daycare Programme for Working Mothers. This program allowed for subsidized home and community based childcare. The one running the care centers would only have to have a training component, which consisted of a psychological test and training courses to understand the principles of childcare, before being able to open their business in which they would be given money to furnish the facility as necessary for a safe caring center to be created. Another way this program was set into place was by subsidizing the care of non-profits, private for profits, or religious institutions who were based in the area of need.

=== Norway ===
Many children in Norway start daycare between 10 months and 3 years old. Funded parental leave for working parents is either 44 weeks with full pay, or 54 weeks with 80% pay (both up to a certain level only). The government guarantees daycare for all children that are at least 1 year old by 1 August. Coverage is still not 100%, but most regions are getting close (2011). There's a maximum price to enable all families to afford it.

The World Economic Forum lauds Norway as one of the best countries to raise a child. Like other Scandinavian countries, Norway has a prominent welfare system that offers family benefits and policies. Norway's child care services include a Maternity Package that provides new mothers with products for their new child. Additionally, parents in Norway receive an allowance that can be used on child care. Norway also caps fees for child care in kindergarten at NOK 2,500.

=== Spain ===
Spain provides paid maternity leave of 16 weeks to mothers and 5 weeks of paternity leave to fathers.

In Spain, beyond maternity leave provisions of four months, families frequently choose to enroll their children in pre-school programs, including about 95–97% of three to four year olds that attend a combination of state and private nurseries. The Spanish government does subsidize child care, and state led childcare services require proof of low income.

=== United Kingdom ===
In England, childcare is inspected and regulated by His Majesty's Inspectors (Office for Standards in Education). Care for children under five is split into childcare on domestic premises (childminding and daycare). In the UK being a 'Childminder' is a protected title and can only be used by registered professionals. Registered childminders are trained, insured and qualified in Pediatric First Aid. They comply and work with the Early Years Foundation Stage statutory framework provided by the Department for Education. All pupils in the Early Years must follow a programme of education in seven areas, divided into 'prime areas' and 'specific areas'.

The three prime areas:

- communication and language
- physical development
- personal, social and emotional development

The four specific areas:

- literacy
- mathematics
- understanding the world
- expressive arts and design

The Early Years Foundation Stage sets the standards that all early years providers must meet to ensure that children learn and develop well and are kept healthy and safe. It promotes teaching and learning to ensure children's 'school readiness' and gives children the broad range of knowledge and skills that provide the right foundation for good future progress through school and life.

Childminders have the same responsibilities for education as nurseries and reception classes. They generally work from their own homes and are always self-employed setting their own terms and conditions. The Professional Association for Childcare & Early Years promotes and supports high-quality child-minding expertise, and provides information for childminders and parents. The UK has a wide range of childcare options, including childminders, day nurseries, playgroups and pre-school education at school. Childcare in both the state and public sector is regulated and registered by the Office for Standards in Education in England and Care Inspectorate Wales for Wales, which operate the application and inspection process for the sector.

Every child in England at the first school term after their third birthday is entitled to 15 hours per week free childcare funding. Childcare is primarily funded by parents after this age, however, the Single Funding Formula (pre-school funding) can be used at some day nurseries, playgroups and schools for a maximum of 5 sessions per week, after a child reaches 3 years. The government introduced childcare vouchers for businesses.

In Scotland Care Commission is responsible for improving care and education for children from birth to age seventeen. Inspection reports include feedback from staff and parents as well as the inspectors, aiming to provide parents and carers information to help them decide whether a particular child care setting is providing good quality child care and meeting government standards.

=== United States ===
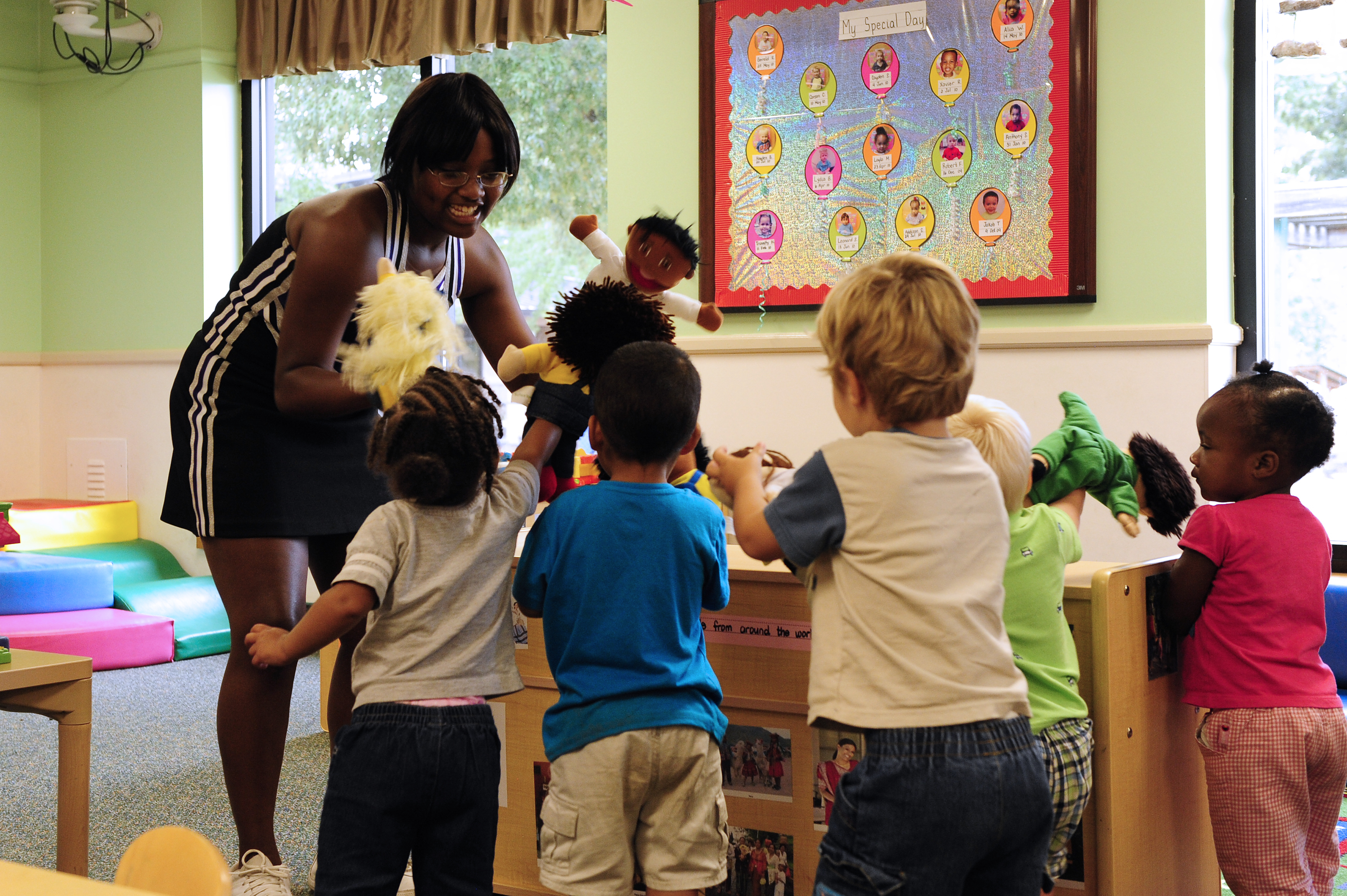
An American childcare development center

As of 2001, more than half of the children in the United States attend childcare facilities. This number has increased as the number of working parents has increased. The increase in the number of children that are required to have some childcare service has brought childcare facilities into increasing demand.

In March 2025, 13 percent of U.S. private-industry workers had access to employer-provided child care benefits. Access varied by establishment size: 8 percent among workers at establishments with fewer than 100 workers, 10 percent at those with 100 to 499 workers, and 30 percent at those with at least 500 workers.

State legislation may regulate the number and ages of children allowed before the home is considered an official daycare program and subject to more stringent safety regulations. Each state has different regulations for teacher requirements. In some states, teachers must have an associate's degree in child development. States with quality standards built into their licensing programs may have higher requirements for support staff, such as teacher assistants. In Head Start programs, by 2012, all lead teachers must have a bachelor's degree in Early Childhood Education. States vary in the standards set for daycare providers, such as teacher-to-child ratios.

If the provider chooses to go through the process, family childcare can also receive national accreditation from the National Association of Family Childcare. National accreditation is only awarded to those programs that demonstrate the quality standards set forth by the NAFCC.

A number of universities and institutions undertake research on child care in the United States, including University of Florida's Department of Family, Youth and Community Sciences (IFAS) from 2006, (Note: Quality Child Care From University of Florida/IFAS Department of Family, Youth and Community Sciences, Factors in choosing quality child care.) the Public Agenda from 2001, (Note: Issue Guide on Child Care Examines policy alternatives and public opinion on child care in the US, from Public Agenda Online) the National Child Care Information and Technical Assistance Center (NCCIC) from 2009, the government resource, Childcare, (Note: Childcare.gov Resources about daycare and early development) and the IRS Child and Dependent Care Credit information from 2003. (Note: IRS Child and Dependent Care Credit information)

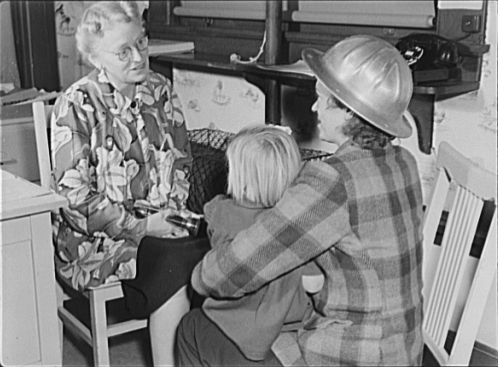
A worker drops off her child at a California day care center, 1943.

In 1971, the Comprehensive Child Development Act was passed by Congress, but was vetoed by then-President Richard Nixon. It "would have created nationally funded child care centers providing early childhood services and after-school care, as well as nutrition, counseling, and even medical and dental care. The centers would charge parents on a sliding scale." Various proposals have been considered, but to date, none leading to legislation that would establish a national policy supporting day care in the United States.

In 1990, the Child Care and Development Block Grant Act of 1990 was enacted under the Omnibus Budget Reconciliation Act of 1990, creating a dedicated federal funding stream for child care subsidies to low-income families.

According to the 1995 U.S. Census Bureau Survey of Income and Program Participation (SIPP), over 36% of families of preschoolers with working mothers primarily relied on childcare in the home of a relative, family daycare provider or other non-relative.

In 1996, the 104th Congress passed The Personal Responsibility and Work Opportunity Reconciliation Act of 1996 (PRWORA), consolidating three federal child care programs previously serving low-income families under the program formerly known as Aid to Families with Dependent Children.

By 2001, child care had become an important aspect of American society, with more than "thirteen million American children under 5 years of age experiencing some form of child care before entering formal school."

By 2003, almost 26% of families used organized childcare facilities as their primary arrangement.

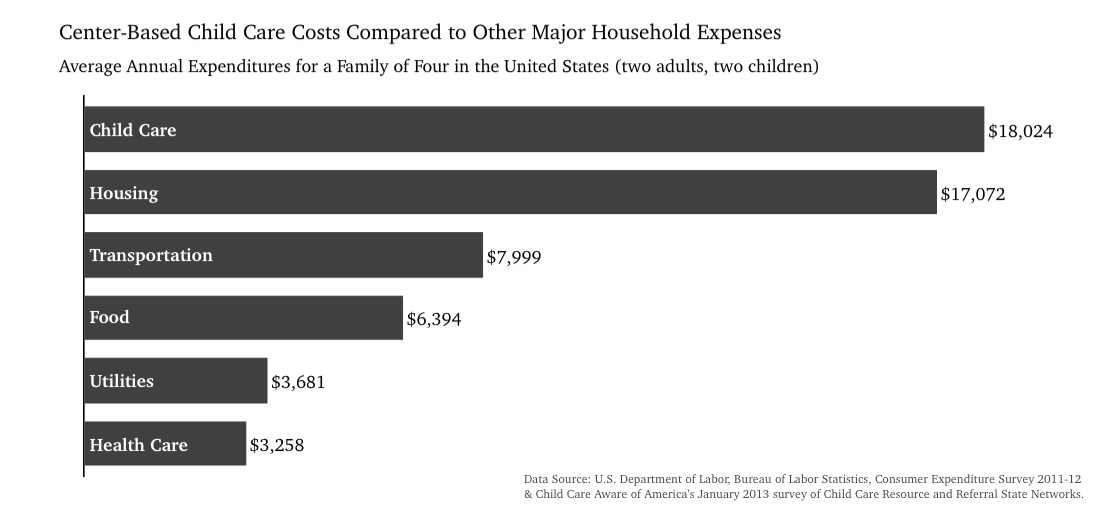
Average annual expenditures for a family of four in the United States (two adults, two children)

Studies show that families in the United States are paying a significant part of their earnings for child care. Between 2011 and 2012, the cost of child care increased at up to eight times the rate of increases in family income. For a four-year-old child, center-based care ranges from about $4,300 in Mississippi to $12,350 in Massachusetts. Lower income families have been disproportionately affected by these increases in child care costs. Working families at or near the poverty line did not receive any or enough child care assistance to be able to stay employed and off welfare, and only 12% to 15% of eligible families were served by a Child Care Development Fund subsidy in 1998–1999.

Economics professor Nancy Folbre commented critically on the Commission for the Measurement of Economic Performance and Social Progress in Paris, saying that one of the major weaknesses of the press coverage of the commission's report in The New York Times, The Wall Street Journal, and The Financial Times was the lack of consideration for unpaid work, such as that of family or community members.

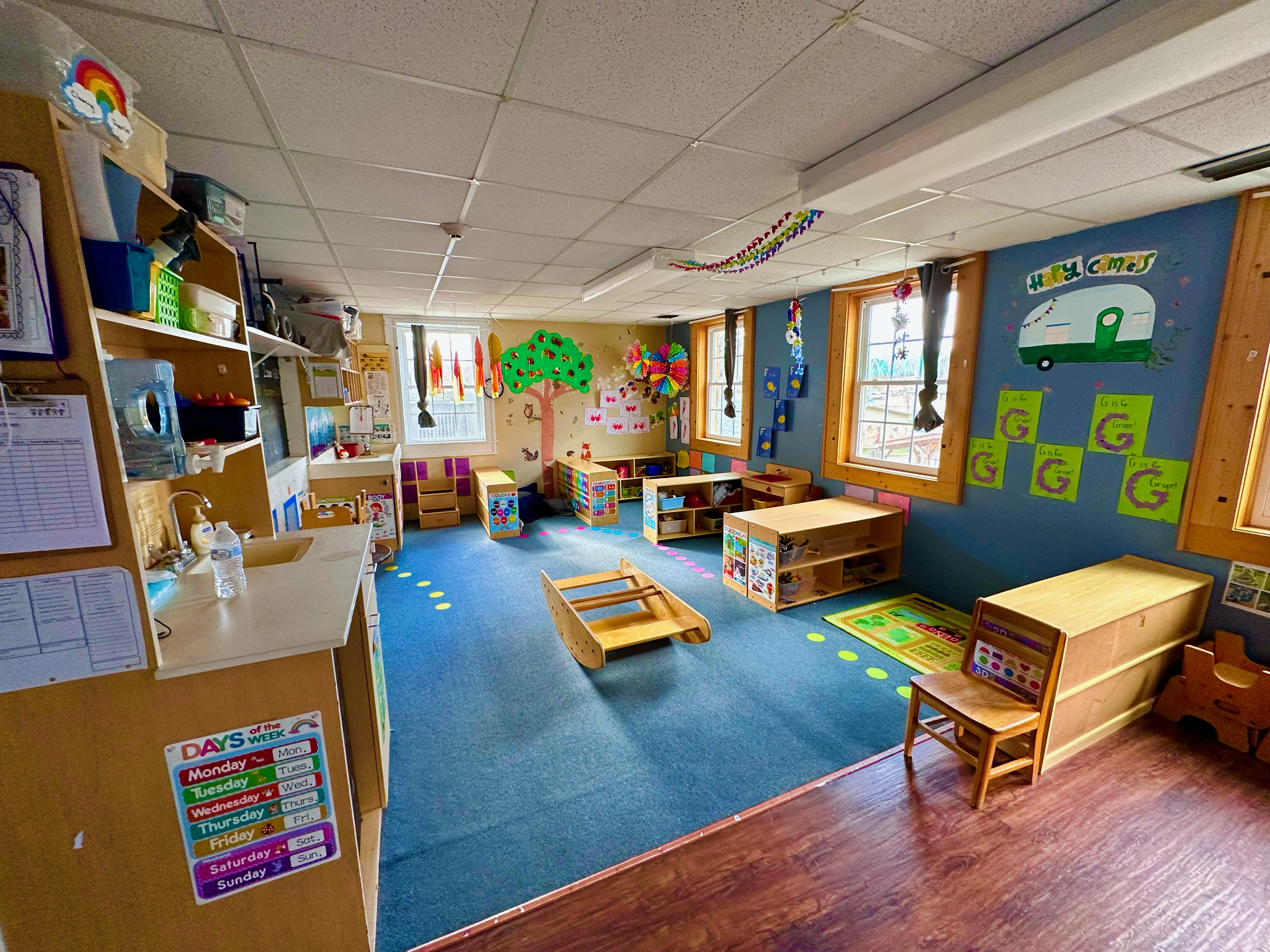
A daycare classroom in the United States

In March 2014, the U.S. Senate passed a reauthorization of the Child Care and Development Block Grant program that included "some baseline changes to make sure there's safe child care", said Nick Vucic, a senior government affairs associate at Child Care Aware of America." Child Care Aware of America supported the bill, saying that it is "time to strengthen minimum protections for children", which they believed the reauthorization and amendments would do. The organization supported having background checks on workers, requiring basic CPR and health training, and holding unannounced inspections. Afterschool Alliance also supported the bill, saying "it is important to emphasize the value of quality school-age child care to achieve positive outcomes for children, including improved academic performance, work habits, and study skills. On 12 September 2014, House and Senate leaders reached a bipartisan agreement to reauthorize the Child Care and Development Block Grant Act. Negotiated by Representatives John Kline (R-MN), George Miller (D-CA), Todd Rokita (R-IN), and David Loebsack (D-IA), and Senators Tom Harkin (D-IA), Lamar Alexander (R-TN), Barbara Mikulski (D-MD), and Richard Burr (R-NC), the agreement will enhance transparency, strengthen health and safety protections, and improve the quality of care. The U.S. House of Representatives passed the amended version of the bill on 15 September 2014.

On 19 November 2014, President Barack Obama signed S.1086, the Child Care and Development Block Grant Act of 2014, into law.

In addition to the cost of childcare in the United States, the quality of institutions and programs is inferior to those in other countries. A 2013 The New Republic cover story entitled, "The Hell of American Day Care", said that there are potential benefits and harms related to formal child care. The article cited a National Institute of Child Health Development survey from 2007 that indicated the lack in quality of American healthcare centers.

In the United States—unlike many other developing countries—a full economic recovery from the COVID-19 pandemic crisis has been "hampered" by one of its "most daunting obstacles"—"America's already fragile child-care system". In a Bloomberg interview the University of California, Berkeley's Center for the Study of Child Care Employment said that the American child-care system had been "upended".

Starting in 2022, Community Change Action has sponsored a yearly National Day Without Child Care. The walkouts, which involve parents and workers, are focused on demands for universal childcare and better wages for childcare workers.

In 2024, the average annual cost of center-based child care for one child was $13,128, a 29% increase from 2020, compared to a 22% rise in overall consumer prices over the same period. For a married couple with children earning the median household income, child care for one child accounted for approximately 10% of their income, while for a single parent, it represented about 35%. In 45 states and the District of Columbia, the average annual cost of center-based care for two children exceeded typical mortgage payments. In 49 states and the District of Columbia, the cost for two children surpassed median annual rent payments.

In 2025, New Mexico became the first state to offer free child care to all families.

=== New Zealand ===
By 2006, New Zealand began to use learning stories as a learning model in their curriculum called "Te Whaariki". It highlights children's learning outcomes as 'disposition' which are "situated learning strategies plus motivation-participation repertoires from which a learner recognize, selects, edits, responds to, resists, searches for and constructs learning opportunities". This was adopted in other places, including Australia. Learning stories are documents that are used by caregivers and educators in childcare settings. They use a storytelling format instead of a traditional 'observation' report to document the different ways that young children learn, and capture the moment in greater detail and provide parents with a greater insight into the events that occur in their child's time in childcare. Learning stories include the story of the child's progress, pictures of the experiences, the child's strengths, interests and needs, and spaces for parent feedback

== See also ==
- Adult daycare center
- After-school activity
- Baumol effect – Rise of salaries in jobs that have seen little rise of productivity
- Day care sexual abuse hysteria
- Ladies' Deborah and Child's Protectory
- Preschool
- Day care
- Corporate child care
- Nanny
- Babysitting
- Parental leave
- Magda Gerber
- Au pair
- Nursery school
- Kindergarten
- Forest kindergarten
- Playwork
- Child development
- Forgotten baby syndrome
- Work-family balance in the United States
- Reproductive labor
