= Wickliffe Rose =

American public health advocate and administrator (1862–1931)

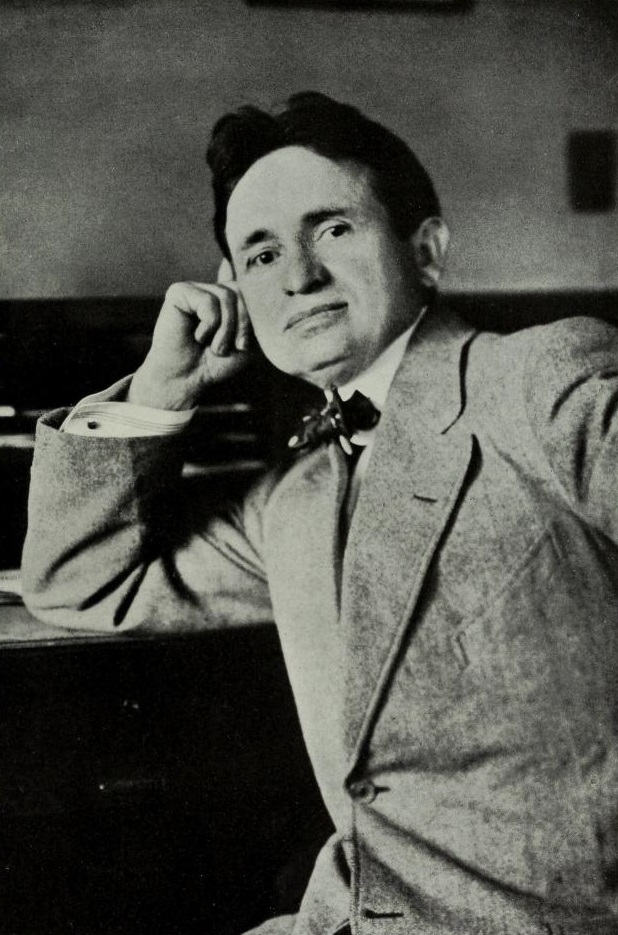

Wickliffe Rose (November 19, 1862 in Saulsbury, Tennessee – September 5, 1931 in British Columbia was the first director of the International Health Board of the Rockefeller Foundation and won the Public Welfare Medal in 1931.

Rose became director of the Sanitary Commission for the Eradication of Hookworm in the South (southern United States) in 1910. He worked for the foundation until 1914.

Rose died of heart disease.

== See also ==
- Public health in American history#Hookworm; he headed the project
