= Demographic history of the United States =

The United States is a country primarily located in North America. Demographics of the United States concern matters of population density, ethnicity, education level, health of the populace, economic status, religious affiliations, and other aspects regarding the population.

American population 1790–1860

== Historical Census population ==
The following table shows 1610–2020 population data. The census numbers do not include Native Americans until after 1860.

Census year	Population	Growth rate
1610	350	N/A
1620	2,302	557.71%
1630	4,646	101.82%
1640	26,634	473.27%
1650	50,368	89.11%
1660	75,058	49.01%
1670	111,935	49.13%
1680	151,507	34.35%
1690	210,372	38.85%
1700	250,888	19.26%
1710	331,711	32.21%
1720	466,185	40.54%
1730	629,445	35.02%
1740	905,563	43.87%
1750	1,170,760	29.29%
1760	1,593,625	36.12%
1770	2,148,076	34.79%
1780	2,780,369	29.44%
1790	3,929,214	41.32%
1800	5,308,483	35.10%
1810	7,239,881	36.38%
1820	9,638,453	33.13%
1830	12,866,020	33.49%
1840	17,069,453	32.67%
1850	23,191,876	35.87%
1860	31,443,321	35.58%
1870	38,558,371	22.63%
1880	50,189,209	30.16%
1890	62,979,766	25.48%
1900	76,212,168	21.01%
1910	92,228,496	21.02%
1920	106,021,537	14.96%
1930	123,202,624	16.21%
1940	132,164,569	7.27%
1950	151,325,798	14.50%
1960	179,323,175	18.50%
1970	203,211,926	13.32%
1980	226,545,805	11.48%
1990	248,709,873	9.78%
2000	281,421,906	13.15%
2010	308,745,538	9.71%
2020	331,449,281	7.35%

^{a} US Census Bureau 2020 census.

== Median age at marriage ==
From 1890 to 2021, the median age at first marriage was as follows:

Year	Men	Women
1890	26.1	22.0
1900	25.9	21.9
1910	25.1	21.6
1920	24.6	21.2
1930	24.3	21.3
1940	24.5	21.5
1950	22.8	20.3
1960	22.8	20.3
1970	23.2	20.6
1980	24.7	22.0
1990	26.1	23.9
2000	26.8	25.1
2010	28.2	26.1
2021	30.4	28.6

== Median age ==
Year	Median age
1820	16.7
1830	17.2
1840	17.8
1850	18.9
1860	19.4
1870	20.2
1880	20.9
1890	22.0
1900	22.9
1910	24.1
1920	25.3
1930	26.5
1940	29.0
1950	30.2
1960	29.5
1970	28.1
1980	30.0
1990	32.9
2000	35.3
2010	37.2
2020	38.8

== Immigration ==
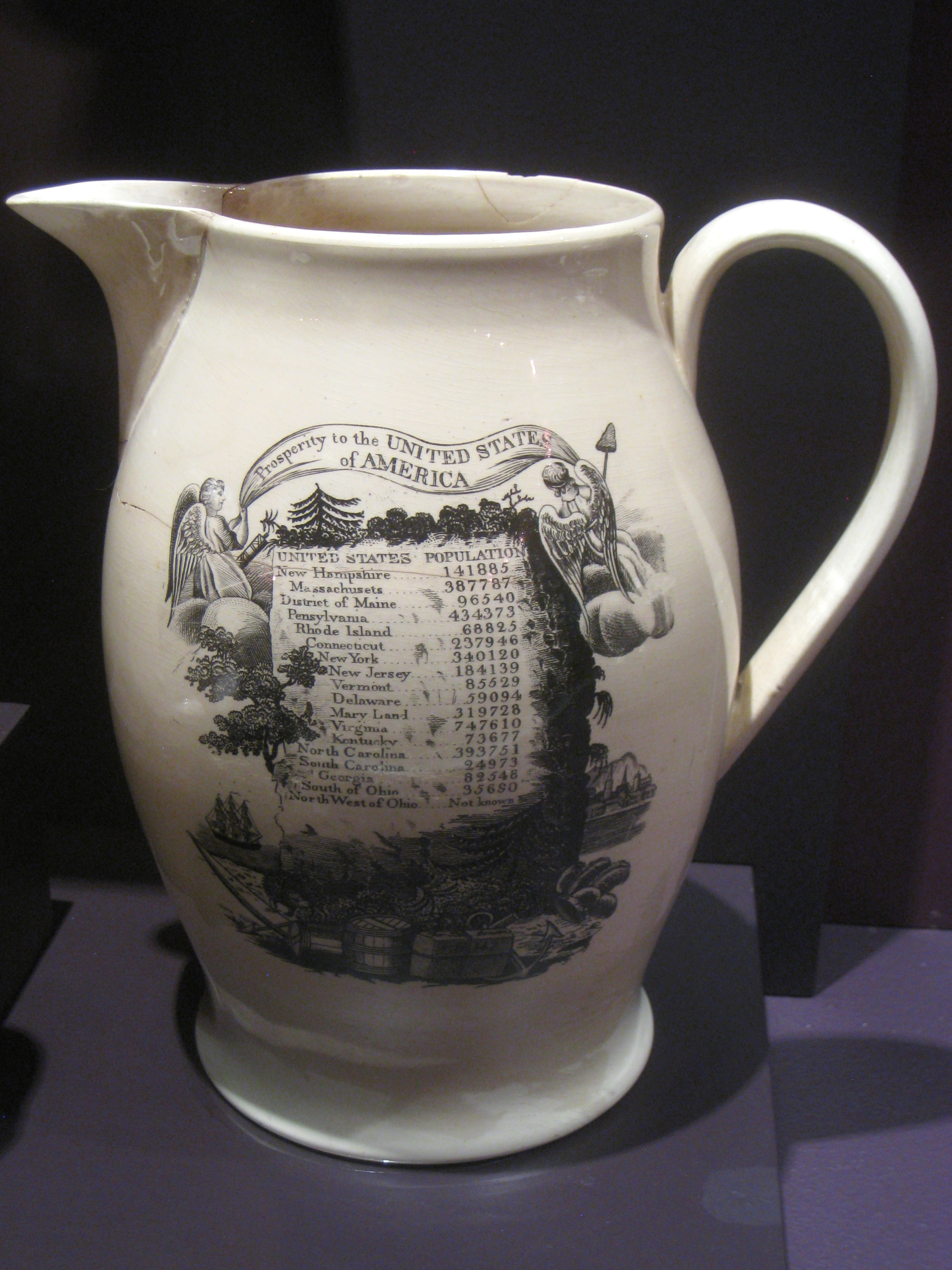
English transfer-printed Staffordshire pottery jug with US population by state, c. 1790

=== Earlier colonial era ===
Nearly all non-Native American commercial activity was run in small privately owned businesses with good credit both at home and in England being essential since they were often cash poor. Most settlements were nearly independent of trade with Britain as most grew or made nearly everything they needed—the average cost of imports for most households was only about 5–15 English pounds per year. Most settlements were created by complete family groups with several generations often present. Probably close to 80% of the families owned the land they lived and farmed on. They nearly all used English Common Law as their basic code of law and, except for the French, Dutch and Germans spoke some dialect of English. They established their own popularly elected governments and courts and were mostly self-governing, self-supporting, and self-replicating.

Nearly all colonies and, later, states in the United States were settled by migration from another colony or state, as foreign immigration usually only played a minor role after first initial settlements were established.

==== New England ====
The New England colonists included some educated men as well as many skilled farmers, tradesmen and craftsmen. They were mostly farmers and settled in small villages for common religious activity. Shipbuilding, commerce, and fisheries were important in coastal towns. New England's healthy climate (the cold winters killed mosquitoes and other disease-bearing insects), and abundant food supply resulted in the lowest death rate and highest birth rate of any place in the world (marriage was expected and birth control was not, and a much higher than average number of children and mothers survived).

The eastern and northern frontier around the initial New England settlements was mainly settled by the Yankee descendants of the original New Englanders. Emigration to the New England colonies after 1640 and the start of the English Civil War decreased to less than 1% (about equal to the death rate) in nearly all years before 1845. The rapid growth of the New England colonies (total population ≈700,000 by 1790) was almost entirely due to the high birth rate (>3%) and low death rate (<1%) per year.

==== Middle colonies ====
The middle colonies' settlements were scattered west of New York City, New York (est. 1626 by Dutch, taken over by the English in 1664) and Philadelphia, Pennsylvania (est. 1682). The Dutch-started colony of New York had an eclectic collection of residents from many different nations and prospered as a major trading and commercial center after about 1700. Pennsylvania was dominated by the Quakers for decades after they emigrated there, mainly from the North Midlands of England, from about 1680 to 1725. The main commercial center of Philadelphia was run mostly by prosperous Quakers, supplemented by many small farming and trading communities with strong German contingents located in the Delaware River valley.

Many more settlers arrived in the middle colonies starting in about 1680, when Pennsylvania was founded, and many Protestant sects were encouraged to settle there for freedom of religion and good, cheap land. These settlers were of about 60% German and 33% English extraction. By 1780 about 27% of New York's population were descendants of Dutch settlers (55,000 of 204,000). New Jersey was home to the remaining Dutch and they constituted 14% of the population of 140,000. The rest were mostly English with a mixture of other Europeans and about 6% Blacks. New Jersey and Delaware had a majority of British with 20% German-descended colonists, about a 6% black population, and a small contingent of Swedish descendants of New Sweden. Nearly all were at least third-generation natives.

==== South ====
The main feature of the economy in Virginia, Maryland and South Carolina was large plantations growing staples for export, especially tobacco and rice. Outside the plantations, land was farmed by independent farmers who rented from the proprietors, or (most often) owned it outright. They emphasized subsistence farming to grow food for their large families. Many of the Irish immigrants specialized in making rye whiskey, which they sold to obtain cash. In Maryland, by 1700 there were about 25,000 people and by 1750 that had grown more than 5 times to 130,000. By 1755, about 40% of Maryland's population was black.

==== Frontier ====
From 1717 to 1775 the western frontier was populated primarily by Presbyterian settlers who migrated from Scotland and Ireland. Frontier settlers initially landed in Philadelphia or Baltimore before migrating to the western frontier for the cheaper land.

=== Natural growth ===
All the colonies grew mostly by natural growth, with foreign born populations rarely exceeding 10%. The last significant colonies to be settled mainly by immigrants were Pennsylvania in the early 18th century and Georgia and the Borderlands in the late 18th century, as internal migration (not immigration) continued to provide nearly all the settlers for each new colony or state. This pattern would continue throughout US history. The extent of colonial settlements by 1800 is shown by this map from the University of Texas map collection.

Estimated population of American colonies 1620 to 1780 Series Z-19 US Census Note that the U. S. Census numbers do not include American Indian natives before 1860.
Year	1780	1760	1740	1720	1700	1680	1660	1640	1620
Tot pop.	2,780,400	1,593,600	905,600	466,200	250,900	151,500	75,100	26,600	500
Maine (Note: Maine was part of Massachusetts from about 1652 to 1820, when it was granted statehood as part of the Missouri Compromise.)	49,100	20,000	—	—	—	—	—	900	—
New Hampshire (Note: New Hampshire was part of Massachusetts until about 1685, when it was split off and established under a British appointed governor. It was one of the original 13 colonies.)	87,800	39,100	23,300	9,400	5,000	2,000	1,600	1,100	—
Vermont (Note: Vermont was contested between the French and British settlers until the British victory French and Indian War (1755–1763) ended French threats with the cessation of French Canada to Britain. The territory was then disputed between Massachusetts, New York and New Hampshire until the settlers declared their independence from all of them and were accepted as the 14th state in 1791 and participated in the 1790 census a year late.)	47,600	—	—	—	—	—	—	—	—
Plymouth (Note: Plymouth, Massachusetts despite being the first permanent New England settlement, lost its charter in 1690 and became part of the Massachusetts colony.)	—	—	—	—	—	6,400	2,000	1,000	100
Massachusetts	268,600	202,600	151,600	91,000	55,900	39,800	20,100	8,900
Rhode Island	52,900	45,500	25,300	11,700	5,900	3,000	1,500	300	—
Connecticut	206,700	142,500	89,600	58,800	26,000	17,200	8,000	1,500	—
New York	210,500	117,100	63,700	36,900	19,100	9,800	4,900	1,900	—
New Jersey	139,600	93,800	51,400	29,800	14,000	3,400	—	—	—
Pennsylvania	327,300	183,700	85,600	31,000	18,000	700	—	—	—
Delaware	45,400	33,300	19,900	5,400	2,500	1,000	500	—	—
Maryland	245,500	162,300	116,100	66,100	29,600	17,900	8,400	500	—
Virginia	538,000	339,700	180,400	87,800	58,600	43,600	27,000	10,400	400
North Carolina	270,100	110,400	51,800	21,300	10,700	5,400	1,000	—	—
South Carolina	180,000	94,100	45,000	17,000	5,700	1,200	—	—	—
Georgia	56,100	9,600	2,000	—	—	—	—	—	—
Kentucky	45,000	—	—	—	—	—	—	—	—
Tennessee	10,000	—	—	—	—	—	—	—	—
Year	1780	1760	1740	1720	1700	1680	1660	1640	1620
New Eng. (Maine to Connecticut)	712,800	449,600	289,700	170,900	92,800	68,500	33,200	13,700	100
% Black (Note: By 1784 all slavery in the New England states was either completely prohibited or transitioning to its total prohibition.)	2.0%	2.8%	2.9%	2.3%	1.8%	0.7%	1.8%	1.5%	0.0%
Middle (New York to Delaware)	722,900	427,900	220,600	103,100	53,600	14,900	5,400	1,900	—
% Black (Note: By 1804 all slavery in the Middle colonies (except Delaware [6.6% Black]) was either completely prohibited or was transitioning to its total prohibition.)	5.9%	6.8%	7.5%	10.5%	6.9%	10.1%	11.1%	10.5%	0.0%
South (Maryland to Tennessee)	1,344,700	716,000	395,300	192,300	104,600	68,100	36,400	11,000	400
% Black (Note: All slavery was prohibited in the entire US in 1865 by the 13th amendment to the constitution (ratified December 6, 1865), except on some American Indian reservations, where it was abolished by treaty in 1866.)	38.6%	39.7%	31.6%	28.1%	21.5%	7.3%	4.7%	1.8%	0.0%

=== Population in 1790 ===
According to one source, the following were the countries of origin for new arrivals coming to the United States before 1790. The regions marked * were part of Great Britain. The ancestry of the 3.9 million population in 1790 has been estimated from various sources by sampling last names in the 1790 census and assigning them a country of origin. The Irish in the 1790 census were mostly Scots Irish. The French were mostly Huguenots. The total US Catholic population in 1790 is estimated at 40,000 or 1.6%, perhaps a low count due to prejudice. The Native American Indian population inside territorial US 1790 boundaries was less than 100,000.

US historical populations
Country	Immigrants before 1790	Population 1790 (Note: Data from Ann Arbor, Michigan: Inter-university Consortium for Political and Social Research (ICPS))
Africa (Note: Several West African regions were the home to most African slaves transported to America. Population from US 1790 Census.)	360,000	757,000
England*	230,000	2,100,000
Ulster Scots Irish*	135,000	300,000
Germany (Note: Germany in this time period consisted of a large number of separate countries, the largest of which was Prussia.)	103,000	270,000
Scotland*	48,500	150,000
Ireland*	8,000	(Incl. in Scot-Irish)
Netherlands	6,000	100,000
Wales*	4,000	10,000
France	3,000	15,000
Jews (Note: Jewish settlers were from several European countries.)	1,000	2,000
Sweden	500	2,000
Other (Note: The Other category probably contains mostly settlers of English ancestry. However, the loss of several states' detailed census records in the Burning of Washington D.C. in the War of 1812 makes estimation difficult. Nearly all states that lost their 1790 (and 1800) census records have tried to reconstitute their original census from tax records etc. with various degrees of success. The summaries of the 1790 and 1800 census from all states survived.)	50,000	200,000
Total (Note: The total is the total immigration over the approximately 130-year span of colonial existence of the US colonies as found in the 1790 census. Many of the colonists, especially from the New England colonies, were already into their fifth generation of being in America. At the time of the American Revolution the foreign born population is estimated to be from 300,000 to 400,000.)	950,000	3,900,000

During the 17th century, approximately 350–400,000 English and Welsh people migrated to colonial America. However, only half stayed permanently. They were 90% of whites in 1700 . From 1700 to 1775 between 400 and 500,000 Europeans immigrated, 90% of whom were Scots, Scots-Irish, Irish, Germans and Huguenots. Only 45,000 English immigrated in the period 1701 to 1775, a figure that has been questioned as too low. Elsewhere the number given is 51,000 (80,000 in total less 29,000 Welsh). These numbers do not include the 50,000–120,000 convicts transported, 33,000 of whom were English. Even the very high birth rate may not account for all of the nine-fold increase from 230,000 to 2.1 million. Another estimate with very similar results to the ICPS study (except for the French and Swedish totals) gives the number of Americans of English ancestry as 1.9 million in 1790 or 47.9% of the total of 3.930 million (3.5% Welsh, 8.5% Scotch Irish, 4.3% Scots, 4.7% Irish (South), 7.3% German, 2.7% Dutch, 1.7% French, 0.2% Swedish and 19.3% Black.

=== Immigration 1791 to 1849 ===
In the early years of the United States, immigration average about 6,000 people per year, including French refugees from the slave revolt in Haiti. The French Revolution, starting in 1789, and the Napoleonic Wars from 1792 to 1814 severely limited immigration from Europe. The War of 1812 (1812–1814) with Britain again prevented any significant immigration. By 1808 Congress had banned the transport of slaves, slowing that human traffic to a trickle.

After 1820 immigration gradually increased. For the first time federal records, including ship passenger lists, were kept for immigration. Total immigration for the year 1820 was 8,385, gradually building to 23,322 by 1830, with 143,000 total immigrating during the decade. From 1831 to 1840 immigration increased greatly, to 599,000 total, as 207,000 Irish, even before the famine of 1845–1849, started to emigrate in large numbers as Britain eased travel restrictions. 152,000 Germans, 76,000 British, and 46,000 French formed the next largest immigrant groups in that decade.

From 1841 to 1850 immigration exploded to 1,713,000 total immigrants and at least 781,000 Irish who fled their homeland to escape poverty or death during the famine of 1845–1849. In attempting to divert some of this traffic to help settle Canada, the British offered bargain fares of 15 shillings for transit to Canada, instead of the normal 5 pounds (100 shillings). Thousands of poor Irish took advantage of this offer and headed to Canada on what came to be called the "coffin ships" because of their high death rates. Once in Canada, many Irish walked across the border or caught an intercoastal freighter to the nearest major city in the United States – usually Boston or New York. Bad potato crops and failed revolutions struck the heart of Europe in 1848, contributing to the decade's total of 435,000 Germans, 267,000 British and 77,000 French immigrants to America. Bad times in Europe drove people out; land, relatives, freedom, opportunity, and jobs in America lured them in.

Population and foreign born 1790 to 1849 Census population, immigrants per decade
Census	Population	Immigrants	Foreign born	%
1790	3,918,000	60,000
1800	5,236,000	60,000
1810	7,036,000	60,000
1820	10,086,000	60,000
1830	12,785,000	143,000	200,000	1.6%
1840	17,018,000	599,000	800,000	4.7%
1850	23,054,000	1,713,000	2,244,000	9.7%

The number of immigrants from 1830 on are from immigration records. The census of 1850 was the first in which place of birth was asked. It is probably a reasonable estimate that the foreign born population in the US reached its minimum in about 1815 at something like 100,000, or 1.4% of the population. By 1815 most of the immigrants that arrived before the American Revolution had died, and there had been almost no new immigration.

The total number immigrating in each decade from 1790 to 1820 are estimates.

The number of foreign born in the 1830s and 1840s are extrapolations.

Nearly all population growth up to 1830 was by internal increase; about 98.5% of the population was native-born. By 1850, this had shifted to about 90% native-born. The first significant Catholic immigration started in the mid-1840s.

=== Immigration 1965 to present ===
In 1965, US immigration law changes reduced the emphasis on national origin. Prior policy favored European immigrants. The 1965 law directed that those with relatives in the US or employer sponsorship now had priority. By the 1970s, most immigrants to the US came from Latin America or Asia, rather than Europe. Since 2000, over three quarters of all immigrants to the US have come from Asia and Latin America.

== Migration within the United States ==
=== The American West ===
In 1848, the Treaty of Guadalupe Hidalgo, concluding the Mexican War, extended US citizenship to approximately 60,000 Mexican residents of the New Mexico Territory and 10,000 living in California. However, much like Texas, the Mexican government had encouraged immigration and settlement of these regions from groups in the United States and Europe. Approximately half of this population is estimated to have been of American origin. In 1849, the California Gold Rush spurred significant immigration from Mexico, South America, China, Australia, Europe and caused a mass internal migration within the US, resulting in California gaining statehood in 1850, with a population of about 90,000.

=== Rural flight ===
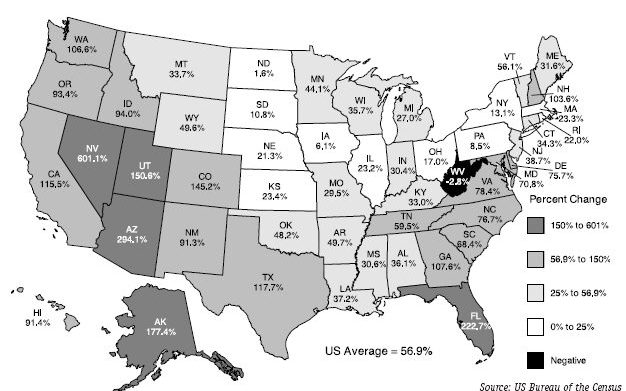
Population change 1960 to 2000 by state

Rural flight is the departure of excess populations (usually young men and women) from farm areas. In some cases whole families left, as in the Dust Bowl in the 1930s. Much of rural America has seen steady population decline since 1920.

=== Black migration out of the South ===
The Great Migration was the movement of millions of African Americans out of the rural Southern United States from 1914 to 1960. Most moved to large industrial cities, as well as to many smaller industrial cities. African-Americans moved as individuals or small groups. There was no government assistance. They migrated because of a variety of push and pull factors:

==== Push factors ====
1. Many African-Americans wanted to avoid the lynching and racial segregation of the Jim Crow South and sought refuge in the supposed "Promised Land" of the North where there was thought to be less segregation.
2. The boll weevil infestation of the cotton fields of the South in the late 1910s reduced the demand for sharecroppers.
3. The Great Mississippi Flood of 1927 and its aftermath displaced hundreds of thousands of African-American farm workers.

==== Pull factors ====
1. Income levels were much higher in the North, with far higher wages in the service sector.
2. The enormous growth of war industries in WW1 and WW2 created new job openings for blacks.
3. World War I effectively put a halt to the flow of European immigrants to the industrial centers, causing shortages of workers in the factories.
4. In the 1930s Works Progress Administration, Civilian Conservation Corps and other relief programs in the North were more receptive to blacks. The WPA paid more in the North.
5. After 1940, as the US rearmed for World War II (see Homefront-United States-World War II), industrial production increased rapidly.
6. The FEPC equal opportunity laws were more enforced in the North and West.

=== Since 1990 ===
The proportion of Americans who move across state lines fell by 50% from 1990 to 2018. Regional disparities in local economies have also grown during this time, meaning that more people remain in economically depressed areas. By 2011, migration levels were at the lowest level since World War II, and were in the longest period of continuous decline in the twentieth century.

== Recent demographic trends ==
=== Post-war baby boom ===
United States birth rate (births per 1000 population). The United States Census Bureau defines the demographic birth boom as between 1946 and 1964 (red).

In the years after WWII, the United States, as well as a number of other industrialized countries, experienced an unexpected sudden birth rate jump. During WWII birthrates had been low, as millions of men had been away fighting in WWII and this had deterred women from starting families: women also had to take the place of men in the workplace, while simultaneously fulfilling their household duties. The millions of men coming back to the US after WWII, and the couples eager to start families, led to a sharp rise in the US birth rate, and a surge in new housing construction in the suburbs and outlying areas of the cities. Since the men who came back got jobs in the workplace again, married women stayed home to take care of the house and children and let their husbands be the breadwinner of the household.

During the baby boom years, between 1946 and 1964, the birth rate doubled for third children and tripled for fourth children.

The total fertility rate of the United States jumped from 2.49 in 1945 to 2.94 in 1946, a rise of 0.45 children therefore beginning the baby boom. It continued to rise throughout the 1940s to reach 3.10 in 1950 with a peak of 3.77 in 1957. Declining slowly thereafter to 3.65 in 1960 and finally a steep from decline after 1964, therefore ending the baby boom.

Total fertility rates
Year	Fertility rate	Change	White non-Hispanic	Black non-Hispanic	Hispanic	Asian	Native
1940	2.30						
1941	2.40	▲					
1942	2.62	▲					
1943	2.72	▲					
1944	2.58	▼					
1945	2.49	▼					
1946	2.94	▲					
1947	3.27	▲					
1948	3.11	▼					
1949	3.11	Steady					
1950	3.10	▼					
1951	3.27	▲					
1952	3.35	▲					
1953	3.42	▲					
1954	3.54	▲					
1955	3.58	▲					
1956	3.68	▲					
1957	3.77	▲					
1958	3.71	▼					
1959	3.69	▼					
1960	3.65	▼					
1961	3.62	▼					
1962	3.46	▼					
1963	3.31	▼					
1964	3.19	▼					
1965	2.91	▼					
1966	2.72	▼					
1967	2.55	▼					
1968	2.46	▼					
1969	2.46	Steady					
1970	2.48	▲					
1971	2.27	▼					
1972	2.01	▼					
1973	1.87	▼					
1974	1.83	▼					
1975	1.77	▼					
1976	1.74	▼					
1977	1.79	▲					
1978	1.76	▼					
1979	1.79	▲					
1980	1.84	▲					
1981	1.81	▼					
1982	1.81	Steady					
1983	1.80	▼					
1984	1.82	▲					
1985	1.86	▲					
1986	1.85	▼					
1987	1.90	▲					
1988	1.97	▲					
1989	2.03	▲	1.77	2.42	2.90	1.95	2.25
1990	2.08	▲	1.85	2.55	2.96	2.00	2.18
1991	2.06	▼	1.82	2.53	2.96	1.93	2.14
1992	2.04	▼	1.80	2.48	2.96	1.89	2.14
1993	2.01	▼	1.79	2.41	2.89	1.84	2.05
1994	1.99	▼	1.78	2.31	2.84	1.83	1.95
1995	1.97	▼	1.78	2.19	2.80	1.80	1.88
1996	1.97	Steady	1.78	2.14	2.77	1.79	1.86
1997	1.97	Steady	1.79	2.14	2.68	1.76	1.83
1998	2.00	▲	1.83	2.16	2.65	1.73	1.85
1999	2.01	▲	1.84	2.13	2.65	1.75	1.78
2000	2.06	▲	1.87	2.18	2.73	1.89	1.77
2001	2.03	▲	1.84	2.10	2.75	1.84	1.75
2002	2.01	▼	1.83	2.05	2.72	1.82	1.74
2003	2.03	▲	1.86	2.03	2.79	1.87	1.73
2004	2.04	▲	1.85	2.02	2.82	1.90	1.73
2005	2.05	▲	1.84	2.02	2.89	1.89	1.75
2006	2.10	▲	1.86	2.12	2.96	1.92	1.83
2007	2.12	▲	1.87	2.13	3.00	2.04	1.87
2008	2.08	▼	1.83	2.11	2.91	2.05	1.84
2009	2.01	▼	1.78	2.03	2.73	1.96	1.78
2010	1.93	▼	1.79	1.97	2.35	1.69	1.40
Sources	1970–2009, 2010						

=== Marriages ===
According to statistics, the United States currently has the highest marriage rate in the developed world, as of 2008, with a marriage rate of 7.1 per 1,000 people or 2,162,000 marriages. The average age for first marriage for men is 27.4 and 25.6 years for women. The United States also has one of the highest proportions of people who do marry by age 40; approximately 85% Americans are married at 40, compared to only 60% in Sweden.

During the 1930s, the number of marriages and the marriage rate dropped steeply due to the Great Depression, but rebounded almost immediately after the Depression ended. Marriage rates increased and remained at high levels in the late 1930 to the mid-1940s. The number of marriages shot up to reach over 2 million in 1946, with a marriage rate of 16.4 per 1,000 people as WWII had ended. The average age at first marriage for both men and women began to fall after WWII, dropping 22.8 for men and 20.3 for women in 1950 and dropping even more to 22.5 and 20.1 years in 1956. In 1959, the United States Census Bureau estimated that 47% of all brides marrying for their first time were teenagers aged 19 and under. In 1955, 51.2% of women were married by their 20th birthday and 88% by their 25th birthday; 40.3% of men and 28.5% of women aged 20–24 in 1955 had never married, down from 77.8% for men and 57.4% for women in 1940.

As of 2002, 4.3% of men and 18.1% of women aged 20 are married, increasing to 37% of men and 52% of women by age 25, and then 61% of men and 76% of women by age 30.

=== Population growth projections ===
The US population in 1900 was 76 million. In 1950, it rose to 152 million; by 2000 it had reached 282 million. By 2050, it is expected to reach 422–458 million, depending on immigration.

== Demographic models in historiography ==
Richard Easterlin, an economist who has researched economic growth in the United States, explains the growth pattern of the American population in the 20th century through fertility rate fluctuations and the decreasing mortality rate. Easterlin has attempted to explain the cause of the Baby Boom and Baby Bust through the "relative income" theory. The "relative income" theory suggests that couples choose to have children based on a couple's ratio of potential earning power and the desire to obtain material objects. This ratio depends on the economic stability of the country in which they live and how people are raised to value material objects. The "relative income" theory explains the Baby Boom by suggesting that the late 1940s and 1950s brought low desires to have material objects, as a result of the Great Depression and WWII, as well as huge job opportunities, because of it being a post-war period. These two factors gave rise to a high relative income, which encouraged high fertility. Following this period, the next generation had a greater desire for material objects; however, an economic slowdown in the United States made jobs harder to acquire. This resulted in lower fertility rates, causing the Baby Bust.

== State trends ==
Between 1880 and 1900, the urban population of the United States rose from 28% to 40%, and reached 50% by 1920, in part due to 9,000,000 European immigrants. After 1890 the US rural population began to plummet, as farmers were displaced by mechanization and forced to migrate to urban factory jobs. After World War II, the US experienced a shift away from the cities and into suburbs mostly due to the cost of land, the availability of low-cost government home loans, fair housing policies, and the construction of highways. Many of the original manufacturing cities lost as much as half their populations between 1950 and 1980. There was a shift in the population from the dense city centers filled with apartments, row homes, and tenements; to less dense suburban neighborhoods outside the cities which were filled with single-family homes.

== See also ==
- Demographic history
- Depopulation of the Great Plains
- Great Migration (African American)
- Historical demography
- Historical racial and ethnic demographics of the United States
- History of public health in the United States
- History of religion in the United States
- Mean center of the United States population
- Rural flight

== Sources ==
- Richard E. Barrett, Donald J. Bogue, and Douglas L. Anderton. The Population of the United States 3rd Edition (1997) compendium of data
- Susan B. Carter, Scott Sigmund Gartner, Michael R. Haines, and Alan L. Olmstead, eds. The Historical Statistics of the United States (Cambridge UP: 6 vol; 2006) vol 1 on population; available online; massive data compendium; the online version in Excel
- Chadwick, Bruce A.; Heaton, Tim B., eds. (1992). Statistical Handbook on the American Family.
- Kennedy, Joseph C. G. Population of the United States in 1860 (1864) official returns of 8th census complete text online
- Riley Moffat. Population History of Western US Cities and Towns, 1850-1990 (1996); Population History of Eastern US Cities and Towns, 1790-1870 (1992)
- US Bureau of the Census, Historical Statistics of the United States: Colonial Times to 1970 (1976)
