= National Helping Families in Mental Health Crisis Day =

On October 7, 2015, a national action day was observed, National Helping Families in Mental Health Crisis Day. It arose based on a bill in the House of Representatives of the 114th Congress called The Helping Families in Mental Health Crisis Act of 2015, HR2646. The bill was originally introduced as The Helping Families of Mental Health Crisis Act of 2013, HR3717. HR2646 contains a number of provisions that will serve to reform mental health care for those Americans with serious mental illness (schizophrenia, schizoaffective disorder, bipolar disorder, major depression). The national day of observance, which was noted in National Review and has been endorsed by National Alliance on Mental Illness (NAMI) will occur in early October each year to raise awareness and encourage action on mental health care policy.
