= Widow's benefit =

Widow's benefit may refer to various components of the social security system in the United Kingdom:

- Widow’s Pension
- Widowed Parent's Allowance
- Widowed Mother’s Allowance
- Bereavement benefit
