= Widow's Pension (UK) =

Public benefits to widows in the United Kingdom

The Widow’s Pension was one of the oldest established parts of the Social Security system in the United Kingdom. It was replaced by Bereavement benefit in April 2001.

Benefits for Widows were first established by the Widows', Orphans' and Old Age Contributory Benefits Act 1925 at a rate of 10 shillings a week for life, to stop on remarriage. To get any benefit as a widow, a woman had to be married to her husband, and be his only wife, at the time of his death. She was still entitled if separated or if a divorce had not reached the stage of decree absolute. All widow's benefits stop on remarriage. The claimant had to be over 45 but under 65 either when their husband died or when their Widowed Mother’s Allowance stopped. There was also an entitlement to an earnings-related component. Widows under 55 when their husband died or when they ceased being entitled to Widowed Mother’s Allowance received a reduction of 7% for each year they were below 55.

Widow’s Pension lasted until retirement and was taxable. It counted in full for all means-tested benefits. It was possible to get Incapacity Benefit together with a widow’s pension.

== See also ==
- Widowed Parent's Allowance
- Mothers' pensions
