= Elterngeld (Germany) =

Form of social benefit in Germany

Elterngeld (parental allowance) is a transfer payment dependent on net income as compensation for concrete disadvantages in the early phase of starting a family and thus a parent-related, temporary compensation payment. The parental allowance replaces the previous child-raising allowance. Parents who are not or not fully employed due to the care of a child or who interrupt their employment for the care of their child are entitled to parental benefit. It is intended to support parents in securing their livelihood and is therefore designed as a compensation payment.

In 2013, 4.9 billion euros were paid as parental allowance (83 % of all expenditure by the Federal Ministry for Family Affairs). Almost 80 % of men receiving parental benefit took two months parental leave; 92 % of women took 10 to 12 months.

== General ==
The Parental Allowance and Parental Leave Act (BEEG), which applies to children born on or after 1 January 2007, replaced the former parental allowance with parental allowance. The parental allowance is generally limited to twelve months immediately after the birth of the child. Over (at least two) partner months the requirement can be extended on altogether maximally 14 months. Single parents who have sole custody or at least sole right of residence are entitled to fourteen months' parental allowance (§ 4 par. 3 BEEG). The amount of the parental allowance depends on the net income of the parent applying for parental allowance and serves as compensation. Therefore, it is important for couples to choose the most favorable tax class six months before maternity leave. If the spouse who stays at home and receives parental benefits after the birth is in tax class V or IV before the child is born, he or she can increase the parental allowance by switching to tax class III at least six months before the maternity leave. Parents who were unemployed or without income before the birth of the child receive the minimum amount of 300 euros for 14 months. Parents who were not employed had received more financial support before the introduction of the parental allowance; see the section on "Historical development".

The Scandinavian model adopted the rule of reserving a fixed proportion of the parental allowance for both the mother and the father. Although a child is entitled to parental leave until he or she reaches the age of three, parental allowance is paid for a maximum of fourteen months. This is intended to provide an incentive to return to work earlier.

The Parental AllowancePlus, which came into force on 1 July 2015, extended the part-time use of the 14 parental allowance months to up to twice the duration.

== Political objective ==
With the parental allowance, the legislator wants to achieve various goals, which he developed in the context of sustainable family policy. This would mark a paradigm shift in family policy. The parental allowance is intended primarily to enable temporary retirement from work without having to accept excessive restrictions on living standards. According to the explanatory memorandum of the law, people should be encouraged to have more children so that they can make a contribution to securing their future. Chancellor Angela Merkel stressed that the coupling of the parental allowance to the amount of the previous salary should encourage academics in particular to opt for more children. However, she assumed that 40 percent of academics were childless.

According to its concept, the parental allowance tries to compensate for the so-called roller coaster effect: This effect consists in the fact that within the framework of modern partnership models, in which both partners are gainfully employed, the birth of the child usually leads one partner (usually the woman) to give up his job and to become economically dependent on the other partner (usually the man). The family income thus falls sharply with the birth of each child until it is old enough for both partners to be (fully) employed again. Since the European family model is culturally based on economic independence from the family of origin, the return to economic dependency (on the partner retiring from working life) as well as the marked drop in income levels is experienced as unpleasant. The roller coaster effect is therefore regarded as the central reason for the low birth rate of 'highly qualified' people, who are particularly affected by this effect.

One of the main incentive mechanisms of the parental allowance is partial compensation of the opportunity costs of childcare, which is also intended to encourage fathers to share the work in a spirit of partnership.

== Legal bases ==
The Federal Parental Benefit and Parental Leave Act came into force on 1 January 2007 and has been amended several times since then.

== Entitled persons ==
- Pursuant to § 1 (1) BEEG, the following persons are entitled to parental allowance
1. has a domicile or habitual residence in Germany,
2. lives with his child in a household,
3. to take care of and educate this child himself, and
4. has no or no full employment.

Under certain conditions (Section 1(2) to (7) BEEG), other persons may also be entitled to parental allowance.

- The condition that the child must be cared for by the recipient does not preclude other persons or institutions from being involved in the care and upbringing of the child.

Foreigners can essentially only claim parental benefit if they are also entitled to child benefit, i.e. if they either hold a settlement permit or have been granted a residence permit for humanitarian reasons, have been legally resident in Germany for three years and are gainfully employed. However, the Federal Constitutional Court declared the requirement of gainful employment for the receipt of parental allowance to be unconstitutional and null and void.

== Reference period and duration ==
Parental benefit is paid for months of the child's life and not for calendar months. For example, if a child was born on 27 July, the first month of entitlement runs from 27 July to 26 August, the second from 27 August to 26 September, the third from 27 September to 26 October, up to the fourteenth and maximum last month of entitlement from 27 August to 26 September of the following year. Income accrued during a month of life for which parental allowance is paid is offset against the parental allowance and reduces it either by the full amount of the income (wage replacement benefits such as maternity allowance) or proportionately in the case of income from gainful employment (see list below).

- Parental allowance can be received from the day of birth until the end of the 14th month of the child's life. ElterngeldPlus (from 1 July 2015) allows this period to be extended in the case of part-time use.
- The application for parental allowance must state the months for which the parental allowance is to be claimed. Parental allowance can be paid retroactively for up to three months. The decision made in the application can be changed once until the end of the reference period without giving reasons.
- Parental allowance is paid for up to twelve months (freely divisible among the partners) and is extended by two so-called "partner months" if the second parent takes parental leave for at least these two months and if one parent reduces his or her income during the reference period. This is already the case if the mother of the child receives the maternity allowance. The parental allowance months can also be claimed at the same time (for example, seven months each for both parents).
- Single parents with sole custody or right of residence can claim the two "partner months" additionally if the child's mother was gainfully employed before the birth of the child.
- The reference period of the parental allowance can be extended to twice this period if only half of it is claimed each month.
- Anyone who had more than €250,000 taxable income in the last completed assessment period or more than €500,000 taxable income in the case of two eligible persons is not entitled to parental benefit (§ 1 par. 8 BEEG).

=== Flexibilisation and partner bonus through Parental Allowance Plus ===
Parents of children born on or after 1 July 2015 are entitled to Parental Allowance Plus, a flexible form of parental allowance. The Parental Allowance Plus can be claimed for part-time work "twice as long and half as high as the full parental allowance". However, partners who share childcare in half at the same time continue to be disadvantaged by the parental benefit compared to couples for whom one of the two only cares and the other works full-time, as it may support them much less:

Example: If, for example, both parents earn above the compulsory insurance limit before birth and are voluntarily legally insured, then the parent who cares exclusively for the child is entitled to the maximum rate of €1,800 per month, while the other, for example, works 40 hours per week.

If the two parents divide the 40 hours into 20 hours per week with 2,401 € gross income per month, then the total subsidy with Parental Allowance Plus for both parents amounts to only 1,364 € (682 € + 682 €) per month. From 3,771 € gross per parent there is even only the minimum rate of 300 € (150 € + 150 €) . In the latter case, the subsidy is €1,500 lower per month for shared care than for care by one parent.

If, on the other hand, one partner stays 100% at home and the other works 100% at the same time and the couple, for example, divides this time in half, the couple receives the full parental allowance of €1,800 per month or, in the case of Parental Allowance Plus, twice as long as €900 per month.

In addition, a partnership bonus "e.g. amounting to 10% of the parental allowance" is paid if the parents both work 25 to 30 hours a week in parallel to receiving parental allowance. These are four consecutive, additional parental allowance months for parents who work 25 to 30 hours a week at the same time.

The partnership bonus is partly similar to the equality bonus (jämstelldhetsbonus) of the Swedish parental allowance.

== Relevant income (assessment period) ==
In principle, the average net income of the applicant from gainful employment in the twelve calendar months prior to the calendar month of birth (monthly net income) is decisive for the calculation of the parental allowance. Only calendar months for which no maternity allowance or parental allowance has been received for another child are taken into account. Months in which income is lost due to illness caused by pregnancy or due to military or civilian service are not taken into account either, although according to case law it is irrelevant which pregnancy is involved. Due to these factors, the assessment period can be considerably longer than twelve months. For employees, the monthly net results from the monthly gross minus taxes, minus statutory social contributions, minus 1/12 of the flat-rate amount for income-related expenses. In the case of self-employed persons, the monthly net amount results from 1/12 of the annual profit. For employees, the monthly net depends on the choice of tax class. A change to a more favourable tax class to increase the net income is possible before application. Starting point is the income without bonus payments, Christmas bonus, vacation bonus, surcharges for Sunday, holiday and night work. For self-employed persons, a longer period may also be relevant. These twelve months apply to self-employed persons who were gainfully employed in their last financial year (§ 2 par. 9 BEEG). The monthly net also includes remuneration for certain employment prohibitions (§ 18[provider/database unknown] MuSchG), but not: unemployment benefit, unemployment benefit II, short-time work allowance, seasonal short-time work allowance, foreign wage replacement benefits, housing benefit, social assistance, domestic help from the health insurance fund, pensions, scholarships, BAföG, sickness benefit from a statutory or private health insurance.

=== Changes as of January 1, 2013 ===
The Act to Simplify the Enforcement of Parental Benefits changed how the relevant net income is calculated from 1 January 2013. In the case of employment, the current gross income subject to income tax is taken from each wage or salary statement, from which a fictitious net income is calculated under IT control. Tax allowances on the income tax card are not taken into account. The net income is also calculated using flat-rate tax rates for profit income. Income tax is calculated by applying the income tax table to the average monthly profit. The changes apply to children born on or after 1 January 2013 (§ 27 (1) BEEG).

The law has made it more difficult for married couples to optimise the amount of parental benefit after birth by changing tax class during pregnancy. A change in the tax class after the pregnancy has become known is now only taken into account if it was submitted to the tax office seven calendar months before the beginning of maternity protection.

== Planned reforms and current debates ==
After the federal elections in 2025, which resulted in the coalition of the Social Democratic Party (SPD) and the Christian Democratic Union (CDU), there have been several debates about the future of parental allowance (Elterngeld).The coalition agreement between the two parties includes goals like achieving a more partnership-based distribution of parenting by trying to increase fathers' sole responsibility. This could be reached through increased wage replacement, improving the distribution of parental allowance entitlement months. In general, the coalition also wants to raise the minimum and maximum amounts and allow flexibility for self-employed parents, regarding calculations of parental allowance. In the agreement it is also stated that during their governing term they ant to strengthen the rights of foster-parents, by introducing parental allowance to them. One of the main goals is to have a consistent end-to-end digitalisation.

At the same time, fiscal consolidation shows that it has led to a lower level of federal payments for Elterngeld and indicates how the results will only be seen through actual reforms. As of now, there have been no official reforms that had a specific outcome on improving or digitalising the parental allowance since the beginning of the coalition's governing term. According to economist Katharina Wrohlich from the German Institute for Economic Research (DIW Berlin), Elterngeld has strengthened gender equality by increasing maternal income and father participation, but the program’s real value has declined due to inflation. She proposes updating income thresholds, expanding partner months, and linking reforms to broader family tax policy.

== Amount of parental allowance ==
- The parental allowance is income-dependent and amounts to between 65 and 100 percent of the former net monthly income, a maximum of 1,800 euros, and a minimum of 300 euros per month (§§ 2 et seq. BEEG). The amount of the parental benefit is based on the average relevant (cf. postponement) monthly net income of the applying parent in the 12 months prior to the birth of the child.

Monthly net income	Share of the resulting parental allowance in the income that ceases to exist
between 0 and 1000 Euro	67 percent increases by 0.1 percentage points per two euros by which the net monthly amount falls below 1,000 euros, up to a maximum of 100 percent. If the income from gainful employment drops to zero during parental leave and the applicant's monthly net income is between 300 and 340 euros, the parental allowance is 100% of the monthly net income. Mothers or fathers who did not receive any income during the assessment period receive a minimum parental allowance of 300 euros, which is credited against the social benefits mentioned in the following section.
between 1.000 and 1.200 Euro	67 percent
higher than 1.200 Euro	67 percent drops by 0.1 percentage points per two euros by which the monthly net exceeds 1,200 euros, to up to 65 percent, which is reached from a monthly net of 1,240 euros.
higher than 2.769,23 Euro	The parental allowance is generally 1,800 euros (= 65% of 2,769.23 euros; maximum value).

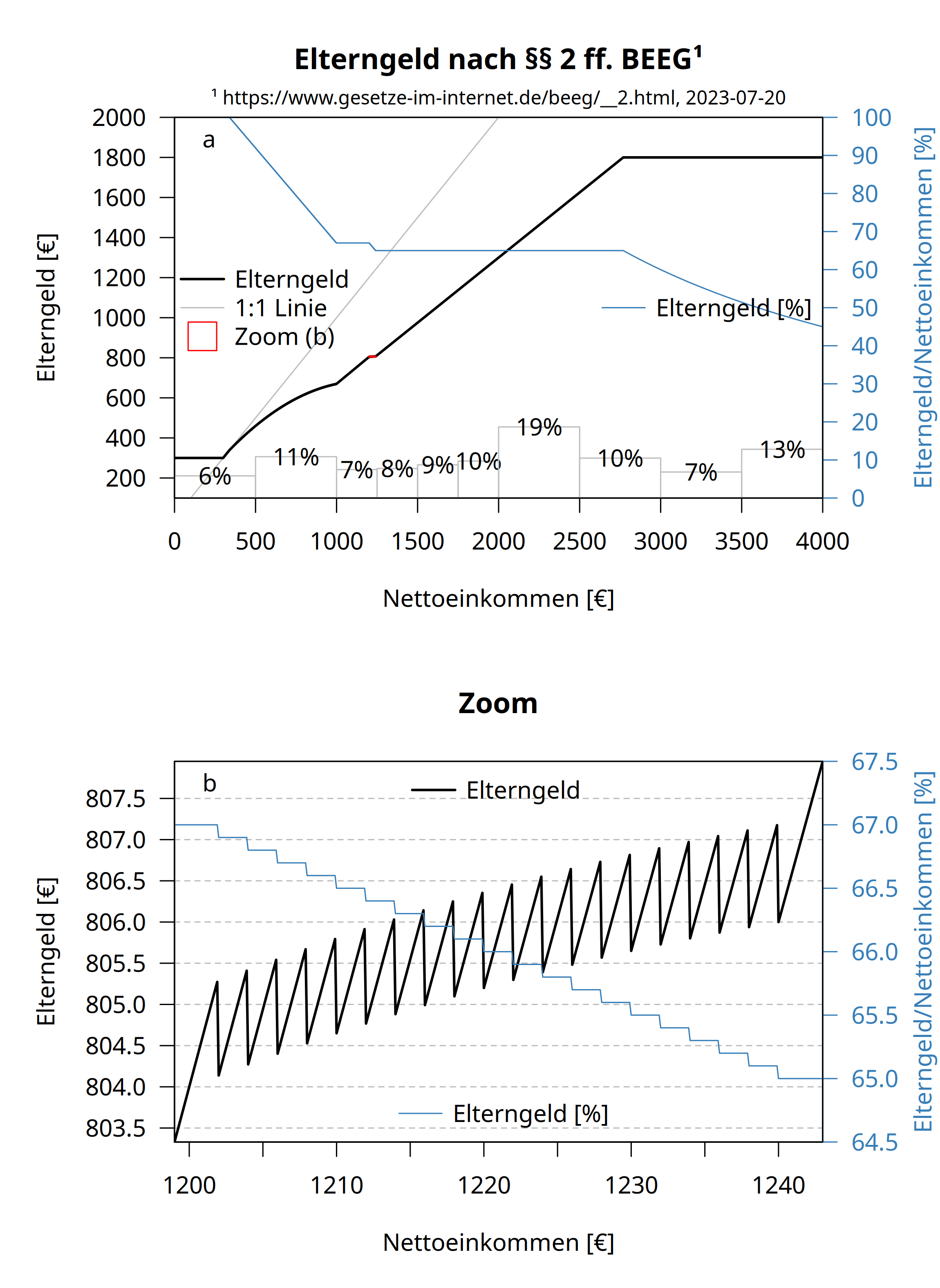
Parental allowance according to §§ 2 ff. BEEG (https://www.gesetze-im-internet.de/beeg/__2.html, 21 August 2017)

- An advertising flat rate of 83.33 euros per month is deducted from the previous net monthly income calculated by the parental benefit office. Only then is the parental allowance calculated. The flat rate for advertising costs is quasi estimated as an earmarked earlier salary, which was spent primarily on the journey to work (distance allowance) or similar, was therefore quasi never available for free use (and was therefore not taxed during working hours) and therefore falls away during parental leave, i.e. is deducted from the salary as if the salary was previously lower by 83.33 euros per month.
- Unemployment has different effects on maternity protection and parental allowance entitlements: While the entitlement to maternity benefit depends on the existence of an employment relationship, the amount of the parental benefit is only linked to the average income during the assessment period, but is otherwise not dependent on the existence of an employment relationship.
- If a father or mother reduces work by the hour after birth, this part-time employment relationship may not exceed 30 hours per week, otherwise the entitlement to parental allowance lapses.
- For part-time employees, the income from part-time work is taken into account. "The supervising parent receives the parental allowance as a replacement for the portion of his or her income that no longer exists. This is the difference between the average income before birth and the expected average income from part-time work during parental allowance payment. For the calculation of the parental allowance, the replacement rate is used which applies to the income before birth: this is at least 65 or 67 percent, for incomes of less than 1,000 euros before birth up to 100 percent. However, a maximum of 2,770 euros is taken into account as income before birth".
- Since the parental allowance is paid for months of the child's life, not for calendar months, income is also taken into account in relation to months of life. For example, if the child was born on the 4th of a calendar month, one month of life lasts from the 4th of a month to the 3rd of the following month. It may be more favourable to take up part-time employment while receiving parental benefit at the same time as the beginning of a month of life or to end it at the same time as the end of a month of life. If a person takes up part-time employment at the beginning of a calendar month, in the example, income would already be credited for the month of life started and lasting until the third month of the calendar month.
- Example: Net monthly income before birth EUR 1,200. Birth of the child on 4 April. The mother earns 400 € in the calendar month of June, her net monthly income for the months of life 4 May to 3 June and 4 June to 3 July is 200 €. In each of the two life months in which she has earned income, she receives EUR 670 parental allowance (67% of the difference between 1,200 and 200). If the mother would achieve the 400 EUR in the period from 4 June to 3 July, she would receive 536 EUR parental allowance for this month (67% of the difference between 1,200 and 400), but in the previous month she would still receive the full 804 EUR parental allowance. In the first case, the sum of the parental allowance for the two months is €1,340 (€670 + €670), in the second case also €1,340 (€536 + €804).
- Who has a child younger than three years or at least two children younger than six years (the newborn does not count), receives a sibling bonus as a surcharge to the parental allowance. This amounts to ten percent, but at least 75 euros per month.
- In the case of multiple births, there is a bonus of 300 euros per month for the second and each additional child. This regulation was reviewed by the Federal Social Court, which ruled on 27 June 2013 that parents with twin or multiple births are not only entitled to one parental allowance per birth, but also to a separate parental allowance for each individual newborn child. Parents can apply for the additional parental allowance amounts at their local parental allowance office - not only for periods from 27 June 2013, but also retroactively for earlier parental allowance periods from 1 January 2009 for applications received up to the end of 2013 or from 1 January 2010 for applications received up to the end of 2014. The BMFSFJ explained: "If one parent uses the parental allowance per month for only one of the children, he or she will receive the full amount of the income-dependent parental allowance plus the multiple child allowance of EUR 300 for each of the other children. For the other child(s), the other parent can receive the parental allowance in parallel in that month." However, the statutory regulations are to be changed as of 1 January 2015 to the effect that for multiple births only one parental allowance entitlement with multiple supplements will arise.

== Tax treatment ==
The parental allowance is free of social security contributions and tax, but is subject to the progression proviso (§ 32b Abs. 1 EStG).

== Crediting of other social benefits ==
Other compensation benefits "which, according to their intended purpose, fully or partially replace this income from gainful employment" shall be credited against the parental allowance (§ 3 (2) BEEG). According to the Directive on § 3 BEEG, the following benefits are to be taken into account:

These benefits are not taken into account if the entitlement to parental allowance is limited to the minimum parental allowance and, if applicable, the multiple bonus.

== Parental allowance when receiving unemployment benefit I ==
The following options can be considered when receiving unemployment benefit I and parental benefit:

- Only those who are entitled to unemployment benefit I are entitled to parental benefits. This means that the income from the period as an employee is used as the basis for assessment.
- Both funds are drawn simultaneously. The ALG I is credited against the amount of the parental benefit, only 300 euros remain free. Thus the ALG I and a reduced parental allowance are paid.

== Parental allowance in the case of receipt of unemployment benefit II ==
Since 1 January 2011, parental benefit has been credited against benefits under Hartz IV as well as social assistance and child allowance under § 6a BKGG. This also applies to parents who made use of the extension option under § 6 sentence 2 BEEG before the introduction of crediting and who did not revoke it before 1 January 2011. However, a parental allowance entitlement arising from gainful employment does not give rise to a credit of EUR 300 (§ 10(5) BEEG).

== Parental allowance for employees of European institutions ==
In the past, the parental benefit offices of the Federal States of Hesse (seat of the European Central Bank) and Bavaria (European Patent Office) refused to pay parental benefits to employees of these authorities. The reason given for this was that these European institutions have their own social security system. In addition, it was argued that parental benefit is tax-financed and that employees of European institutions do not pay German taxes. In a reference for a preliminary ruling from the Hessisches Landessozialgericht, the European Court of Justice has ruled that the Federal Republic of Germany must grant parental allowance to employees of the European Central Bank. This means that employees of the central bank and the patent office would in principle be entitled to parental allowance (possibly with comparable benefits credited).

== Health insurance cover while receiving parental benefit ==
- Previously voluntarily in the legal health insurance insured persons must pay (further) the contribution for voluntarily insured persons. If they have no income other than parental allowance, they pay the minimum contribution. During this period, in addition to a possible income from employment, many other types of income are also taken into account (see list under "Web links").
- However, if they are married, people who were previously voluntarily legally insured may be able to switch to the non-contributory family insurance if they fulfil the other requirements.
- Married persons and persons living in a registered partnership cannot take out family insurance through their privately insured partner. If they are voluntarily legally insured, half of their partner's income is taken into account when calculating the contribution. The monthly contributions then amount to up to approx. 300 € and are payable during parental leave and also thereafter, if no employment is taken up or sought.
- Privately insured persons must continue to pay their contributions.
