= Family preservation =

Family preservation was the movement to help keep children at home with their families rather than in foster homes or institutions. This movement was a reaction to the earlier policy of family breakup, which pulled children out of unfit homes. Extreme poverty alone was seen as a justified reason to remove children. This new movement began in the 1890s, and in the 1909 White House Conference on Children it was the top ranked issue. In order to keep families together, the family would be given enough money so that the mother would not have to work a full-time job. The families that were given this assistance were usually headed by widows.

== Overview ==
Family preservation stems back to the poor laws of the late-eighteen and early-nineteen hundreds. Child-Saving was the theme of the era. With the new labor laws for children, the emphasis on the newly developed child psychology and the fear of family disintegration, social workers put a greater emphasis on the child, who was no longer considered just a smaller adult. Before this, children were systematically taken out of homes if their parents did not make enough income to support them. "Extreme poverty itself, many of the leading authorities of the time had argued, was reason enough to break up a family."

Many Americans are forced to live from paycheck to paycheck, as income is just enough to cover the basic cost of living, with little left over to save for an emergency. The United States has no universal health coverage, and half of all poor full-time workers did not receive health insurance through their jobs. This means they must pay medical expenses out of pocket, or simply not use medical facilities. In 2004, just over 1.5 million American workers were affected by mass lay-offs. Many of these people could find jobs, but only sometimes as good as the job they lost. The average unemployment rate in 2004 was 5.5 percent.

These trends leave it difficult for someone who hit hard times to recover. The number of mothers living below the poverty level has been increasing for decades, and represented over half of the people living below the poverty line in 2003. This leaves women and children increasingly vulnerable to poverty. With the welfare system defined by temporary aid, assistance may run out leaving these women and their children without support. Perhaps Family Preservation will once again become an issue as more mothers become unable to afford or take care of their children adequately.

== History ==
The support of family preservation can be traced back to the negative reaction to the 'orphan train movement'. After the 1851 passage of the Massachusetts Adoption Act, children were shifted from institutions to adoptive families. Reverend Charles Loring Brace, the founder of the Children's Aid Society, was responsible for this movement. He saw children as a threat to social order, who needed to be removed from their poverty stricken parents as poverty restricts moral family values. In March 1884, he loaded a train with 138 children who were affected by poverty and sent them west. These children, half who were not orphans, stood on the platform at each stop waiting to be claimed or sent to the next stop. His methods were replicated and the total number of children affected was estimated from 150,000 to 250,000. The outrage against this practice caused many people to take an alternative method to the extreme, and thus set the stage for the progressive era.

Two early reformers setting the stage for family preservation were Lillian Wald and Florence Kelley. Florence Kelley gave a series of lectures at various universities proposing a United States Commission for Children. This Commission would research and share information in regards to the mental and moral conditions, as well as the prospects of children of the Nation. She included seven major subjects requiring prompt attention including infant mortality, birth registration, orphanage, child labor, desertion, illegitimacy and degeneracy. In 1903, Lillian Wald suggested the creation of a Federal Children's Bureau to Florence Kelley. She argued that there was no reason the government could not have a department to look after children if it could have one to look after farm crops.

President William Howard Taft signed into law the bill that creates the Children's Bureau in 1912. Julia Lathrop was appointed as the first chief and headed a 16 person organization with an initial budget of $25,640. Throughout their nine-year struggle Wald and Florence received support from many prominent people, including President Theodore Roosevelt. They would be credited for spreading these ideas and giving them a far-reaching impact. This impact helped issues of child welfare gain recognition on the state level where change can occur more rapidly.

The first statewide legislation on mothers' pensions passed in Chicago in 1911. In effect, the Chicago Juvenile Court created a system that included both an "institutional track" and a "home-based" track. Both systems were based on two different ideas of what constituted family preservation. The Institutional track was based on the nineteenth- century model of family preservation which actually physically separated the child from the family. Because children were considered part of the "natural" family, the family was considered preserved even in their absence. The children were expected to return home when conditions improved. The home-based track resembled today's idea of family preservation, in which the family is able to remain physically together with monetary aid from the state.

The track chosen was often dependent upon which parent was the primary care-giver. "Motherless children generally ended up on the institutional track and fatherless ones in the home-based track." Fathers with their children in institutions would often pay the state for this service. This distinction was made due to the gender roles of the women raising the children and the men earning a living. Due to the limited guidelines of the mothers' pension act, each case was dependent upon the interpretation of the judges. Guidelines did not even limit pensions to mother's thus allowing judges to grant them to father's. By 1916, 21 states had passed mothers' pensions which grew to 40 by 1920. The Children's Bureau studied mothers' pensions in the United States, Denmark and New Zealand, so that they could guide states as they made such plans.

The creation of the Children's Bureau and the mothers' pension act both contributed substantially to today's welfare system. The Children's Bureau made child welfare the responsibility of the Federal Government and worked to define and shape better policies. The movement to create this Bureau helped the idea of family preservation spread and shape new policy.

The mothers' pension was given credit for the development of the American Welfare State as it exists today. The statewide, and therefore local administration that characterized mothers' pensions is blamed for the absence of a more centralized approach to public welfare. Many historians believe that a centralized approach would be more efficient and rational.

Today's policy lacks centralized control, as states are given freedom to set their own guidelines. Despite this fact, family preservation remains a central idea. Future legislation leading up to today's system, Temporary Assistance to Needy Families (TANF), has continued to preserve families by granting aid. In 1935, the Social Security Act created the Aid to Dependent Children (ADC) program, which became Aid to Families with Dependent Children (AFDC). This eventually became TANF, which was reauthorized in the Deficit Reduction Act of 2005.

=== A rebirth of family preservation ===
Family preservation is seeing a rebirth. There are organizations devoted to preserving natural families in crisis and those who have experienced a wrongful termination of parental rights.

The National Family Preservation Network , founded in 1992 to serve as the primary national voice for the preservation of families through Intensive Family Preservation and Reunification Services (IFPS & IFRS) and a myriad of state programs, many affiliated with schools of social work.

In addition there are father's right advocacy organizations and kinship care and subsidized guardianship organizations and programs such as Kinship Care Practice Project that conducts research, develops training materials, and provides educational opportunities to work collaboratively with extended families.

Family Preservation Foundation (FPF), a national nonprofit with over 12,000 members, advocates for preserving and empowering parental rights, family preservation, family first ideology, stopping unwarranted forced parental separation, and restoring the respect for children’s rights that allow them to remain with their biological parent and/or extended family when its safe to do so, thus preserving the family unit. Founder Dwight Mitchell says that current laws are so vague and written so broadly that Child Welfare can remove children from the family home for anything less than physical harm. FPF, filed a federal lawsuit declaring that certain state laws that govern when and how children can be removed from their homes are unconstitutional and deprive families of due process.

There are also grass roots organizations such as the National Coalition for Child Protection Reform that advocates for systemic reform of the child welfare system and Origins-USA , a national non-profit that advocates natural family preservation and supports families separated by adoption.

The need for these services and initiatives developed largely in response to the over-reliance on transient and often unsafe out-of-home care that characterized services in the 1970s. As early as 1966 the Casey Family Programs operated to provide and improve — and ultimately prevent the need for—foster care.

The peak years for out of family placements into adoption in the US were between the end of World War II and Roe V. Wade. In 1960, New York was the first state to adopt the Interstate Compact on Placement of Children establishing procedures for the interstate placement of children.

By 1967, 44 states adopted laws making the reporting of crimes against children mandatory. According to the National Association of Counsel for Children, "reporting is recognized as the primary reason for the dramatic increases seen in cases of child abuse and neglect."

In 1974, Congress passed landmark legislation in the federal Child Abuse Prevention and Treatment Act (CAPTA; Public Law 93-273; 42 U.S.C. 5101). The act provides states with funding for the investigation and prevention of child maltreatment, conditioned on states' adoption of mandatory reporting law. That same year, the National Center on Child Abuse and Neglect (NCCAN) was created to serve as an information clearinghouse.

While awareness was being heightened about child maltreatment, the supply of babies available for adoption dwindled in the 1970s as single parenthood became more accessible, birth control and pregnancy termination more readily available. At the same time women in the West women began delaying childbirth longer and longer for education and career, creating increased infertility. This reversed the previous supply and demand, with up to 25 adopters vying for each child.

Terminating parental rights most often results in the removal of children, often older children, sibling groups and children of substance abusers. They came to be known as "hard to place" because the growing infertile population sought to replicate a more natural family forming process and thus infants were more highly sought, but less available.

Today, there are half a million children in foster care in the United States. Of those, more than 100,000 have no prospect of being reunited with family and could be adopted. At the same time, the demand for healthy, preferably white infants continued and with fewer American-born babies being relinquished or removed by social services, private entrepreneurs stepped in using marketing techniques gleaned from previous employment as car parts salesman (Arty Elgart of The Golden Cradle), and people skills learned as flight attendants (adoption facilitator Ellen Roseman) to procure babies to meet the demand.

As the maternity homes and adoption agencies of the 60's closed down, they were replaced by the privatization of the adoption industry which today is estimated to be $6.3 billion worldwide, and $2–3 billion in the U.S. The irrevocable rights of parents and the permanent removal and placement of children is arranged today by attorneys, physicians, and anyone who hangs out a shingle and calls their business an adoption agency. Adoption policy and procedure varies state to state but most states have no regulations requiring educational certification in the field of child welfare to arrange adoptions. Adoption agencies are licensed as any business. L. Anne Babb, adoptive parent and author of Ethics in American Adoption notes: “In other professions and occupations, licensing or certification in a specialty must be earned before an individual can offer expert services in an area. The certified manicurist may not give facials; the certified hair stylist may not offer manicures ….Yet…individuals with professions as different as social work and law, marriage and family therapy, and medicine may call themselves ‘adoption professionals’.”

Globally 80% of children in orphanages have families that visit and intend to bring them home. The major cause for temporary care worldwide is poverty, not abuse, neglect or abandonment. Many others have been stolen, kidnapped or coerced from their families by black market baby brokers who sell them to orphanages who prefer to have them adopted internationally because it is more lucrative. Westerners pay $40,000 and more per child, discouraging domestic adoptions in countries in South America, Asia, and Eastern Europe, all of which have been cited for child trafficking scandals. Children pass through so many hands before coming to the West—in a process adoptive father and child and family advocate David M. Smolin, Director, Center for Biotechnology, Law, and Ethics, Samford University, has identified as child laundering—that the recipients have no way of verifying if the child they are adopting is in fact an orphan.

Domestically too, expectant mothers are pressured, and coerced, often taken across state lines, isolated, and exploited at a very vulnerable time. These mothers are also without resources and are given housing and medical care, but are pressured to 'voluntarily' sign papers relinquishing their parental rights or being held liable to repay those expense.

For all of these reasons, there is a resurgence of and renewed commitment to family preservation. Many countries have stopped allowing children to be adopted internationally, and all have ratified the Hague Convention designed to put into action the principles regarding inter-country adoption which are contained in the Convention on the Rights of the Child (CRC) except the U.S. which is reported to do so in 2007. The Hague seeks to insure that inter-country adoption does not result in improper financial gain for those involved in it.

A 2007 UNICEF press release states: “Adoption should always be the last resort for the child. The CRC, which guides UNICEF's work, states very clearly that every child has the right to know and to be cared for by his or her own parents, whenever possible. UNICEF believes that families needing support to care for their children should receive it, and that alternative means of caring for a child should only be considered when, despite this assistance, a child’s family is unavailable, unable or unwilling to care for her or him." “Children have rights. These rights are laid down essentially in the United Nations Convention on the Rights of the Child [UNCRC] and in the Hague Convention on the Protection of Children. Children and their biological parents have a right to respect for their family life.” “Adoption at what cost?” 2007 Terre des hommes - child relief, Lausanne, Switzerland

These are the goals of family preservationists and child welfare experts today.

=== Criticism ===
When it comes to child welfare, all interested parties say they want what is in the best interest of children. The debate stems from what programs actually are in the best interest of the children. Family preservation advocates believe that children are safest and they receive the best outcome when kept in the care of their parents. They support providing in home services for at risk families that range from financial help to parenting classes. Proponents want to take the child out of the house and into the foster system so the child can eventually find permanent placement. They support that government financial aid goes toward foster care and placement programs.

The most prominent debate over family preservation is child safety. Opponents of family preservation believe that it leaves the child in danger by leaving them in the home. They use extreme cases, such as those reported in the media in an attempt to polarize child safety and family preservation. Family preservation is in definition and practice an attempt to keep children safe. The National Coalition for Child Protection Reform NCCPR defines family preservation as a "systematic determination of those families in which children could remain in their homes or be returned home safely, and provision of the services needed to ensure that safety." They find real family preservation programs to have a better safety track record than foster care. Their studies were based on larger segments of the population and included control groups, leaving them much more reliable and generalizable than the horrific case studies used by opponents.

Intensive Family Preservation Services [IFPS] are intensive, time-limited services provided for the family in their home. IFPS is designed to prevent the removal of children from the home in cases of abuse or neglect. The NCCPR accuses their critics of ignoring all of their evidence by relying on one study that found no effects of intensive family preservation services [IFPS]. This study failed to randomly assign groups or provide services that were comparable to actual IFPS. Kirk and Griffith (2004) examined this study and finding major flaws, re-examined the ability of IFPS themselves. They found that IFPS to be effective in reducing out of home placements when the model is comparable and the services are appropriately targeted.

Family preservation advocates strive to protect children while empowering their families and communities. They believe that in most cases, children can best be protected by supporting their parents. The NCCPR remarks that poverty stricken families will not be able to receive the help they need under time limited assistance to care for their children, but once children are removed from the home, the foster care system may receive subsidies for an unlimited amount of time. Pelton (1993) finds that problems associated with poverty are being seen as child abuse and neglect. This leads to a situation of blaming the parent, which in turn hinders the promotion of necessary help. Criticism of IFPS based on both child safety and spending are both discredited by Pelton. As the poor lose their assistance, and in turn their children, the foster care system will become overloaded. This reduces the resources per child by case workers to place them or safe homes to care for them. As the budget goes increasingly towards investigating claims and placement, little money will be left over for any relevant services to help keep children in homes. In effect, more children will enter and increase the already overwhelmed system. If foster homes become scarce, necessitating a greater use of group homes, children will be exposed to much higher rates of danger. The NCCPR reports ten times the rate of physical abuse and 28 times the rate of sexual abuse in group homes than in the general population. These are significantly higher than the rates for foster care which are three times and twice as likely, respectively.

Thieman and Dail (1997) found that low income and welfare recipients are not more likely to have a child removed from their home. This would suggest that low-economic resource families seemed to benefit from family preservation services as much as those with higher economic resources. This would discredit the idea that poverty alone endangers children. If poverty alone does not endanger children, than giving the same resources a child would receive in foster care to the family would seem the better outcome. This would first eliminate the unnecessary drain on the foster care system. Those that need to be removed for safety reasons would have greater resources, giving them a better chance to find a home and be monitored closely. Second, a child who does not enter the foster system is not affected by the possibility of the dangers existing in foster-care. And since only children considered safe are allowed to remain in the home, the proportion of endangered children will be decreased. Third, foster-care is the more expensive of the two options. The NCCPR estimates that IFPS actually produces on average $2.54 of benefits per dollar. Also child well-being is higher when children are kept in the home. The NCCPR found that pregnancy, juvenile arrests and youth unemployment were lower, even when they did not receive IFPS, but only the lesser conventional help offered by child welfare agencies. So it would be cheaper, safer, more efficient on our foster-care system and better on the well-being of children if they remain in their natural home. This is a very strong argument for family preservation advocates.

McGowan & Walsh (2000) believes welfare policies of today to be an attack on low income single mothers dependent on welfare benefits to support their children. These policies are leaning away from family preservation. The Personal Responsibility and Work Opportunity Act of 1996 eliminates entitlement, places a 5-year lifetime limit on TANF, mandates participation in the workforce, eliminates guaranteed childcare and places a family cap on welfare, which prevents children born after the families becoming dependent on welfare from receiving support. The Adoption and Safe Families Act of 1997[ASFA] reaffirms the policy of permanency planning, creates exceptions to reasonable efforts to reunite families, mandates permanency hearings on a twelve-month basis, expedites termination, encourages concurrent planning (for reuniting the family and finding an adoptive family,) and offers a lot more money for children who are adopted. These programs are supported by opponents of family preservation. This contradicts any claim that the best interest of children is their basis for the arguments. There is an abundance of evidence showing that remaining with the family is best for the child. These policies do not allow families the resources to provide for the basic needs of their children. This leaves two options. The children lack their basic necessities, or children are taken out of their homes. The failure of these policies to improve the lives of the children they claim to protect is its own counter argument. It shows that family breakup fails.

The failure of family breakup was actually used as an argument against family preservation. Legislators actually passed ASFA as a response to the increasing number of children in foster care. They blamed the increasing number of children in care and their increasing lengths of stay on "extraordinary efforts" of family preservationists to reunify families. They claimed that family preservationists misinterpreted the idea of reasonable efforts to reuniting families as reuniting at all costs, claiming they put children in unnecessary danger. They believed that ASFA emphasized child protection above child preservation. In reality, ASFA seems to emphasize family breakup above child preservation. Family preservation has an abundance of evidence that it works, when implemented properly. The problem is family preservation is improperly defined by legislature who oppose it. IFPS are proactive rather than reactive. Advocates of family preservation do not support the use of foster-care as holding places for children while their families try to help themselves. They do not condone children living in foster-care in the first place when their parents can be helped, granted that children are not put in danger. IFPS intervene early and prevent child placement in foster-care when possible. As the first premise in their argument is proven false, their overall argument loses validity. In reality the increased number of children in foster care is due to family breakup. It seems they are going in the wrong direction to remedy this major problem. They are just taking a bigger leap in the same direction which has proven to fail already.

The biggest weakness of both sides of the argument is the fact that no approach will ever be the best universally. It will never be to the greatest good to remove all children from their families because some are in danger. Nor would it be appropriate to leave all children in the home because this is best for some. As family preservationist's research is based on bigger and more representative samples, their findings are more generalizable. They become better evidence for shaping policy. Case-studies, used by those in favor of family breakup, consist of a much smaller segment of the population and therefore cannot be generalized to the population. Family preservationists have stronger arguments, and when the definition is not mistaken, those opposing it have not seemed to counter them. They have shown that their programs work and shown that they are superior to opposing programs. Unfortunately, public policy seems to take the opposing side. As family preservationists have already illustrated, this will have terrible implications in the future.
