= Mothers' pensions =

Payments distributed to American mothers

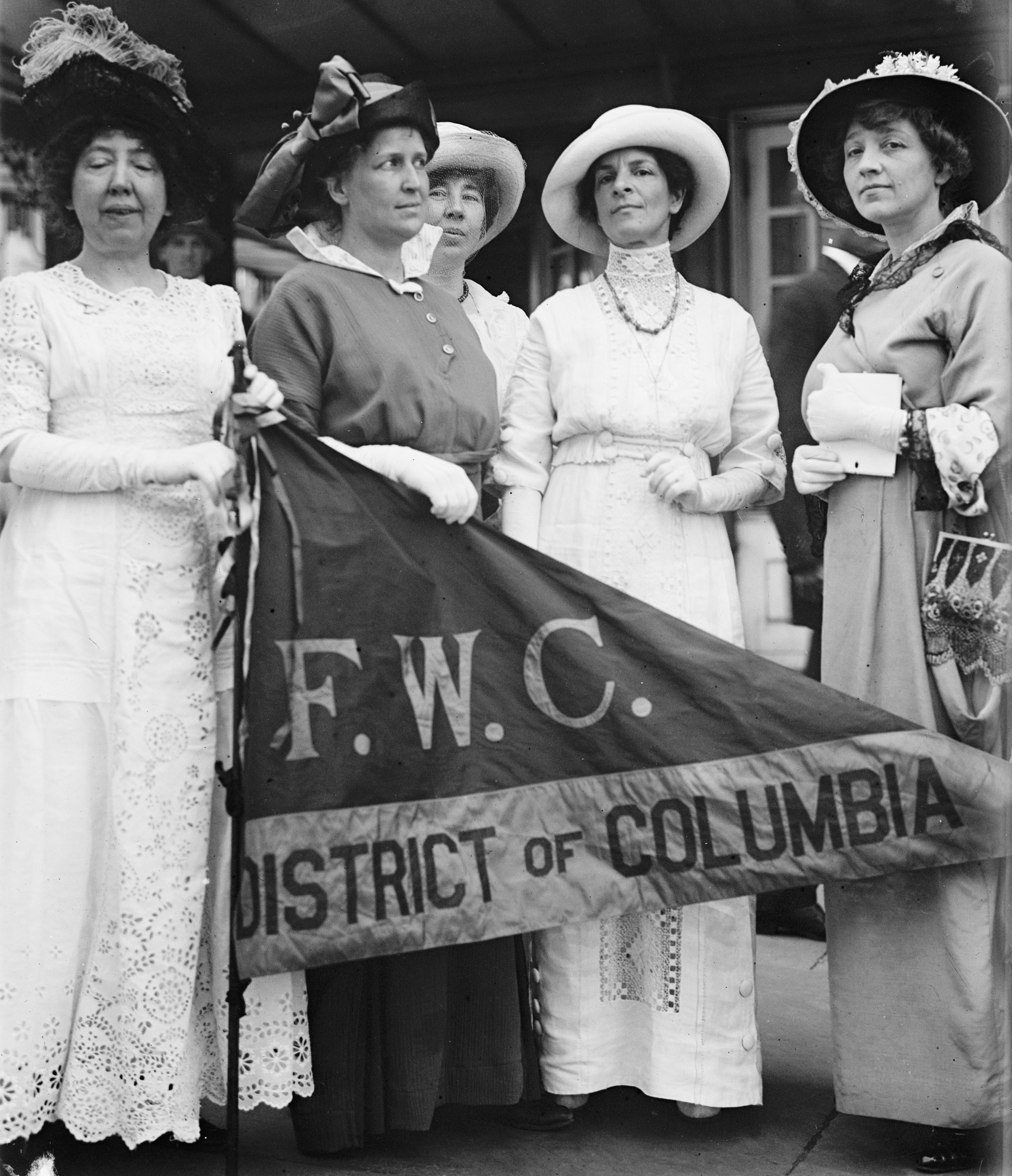
The General Federation of Women's Clubs, which advocated for mothers' pensions

Mothers' pensions are pension payments distributed to mothers. Introduced during the Progressive Era, they were among the earliest components of the modern American welfare state and were the first public cash assistance programs targeted to single mothers. Mother's pensions were aimed at family preservation, intending to provide the means for poor single mothers to care for their children in their own homes. While primarily targeted at widows, they were also sometimes authorized for women whose husbands had deserted them, were confined to mental hospitals or prisons, or were physically or mentally incapacitated. They were financed and administered by state and local governments, and served as a precursor to the federal Aid to Dependent Children program created by the Social Security Act of 1935.

Mothers' pensions can also refer to pension payments for parents in Germany.

== Structure ==
=== Payments ===
Mothers' pensions were long-term cash provisions to impoverished single mothers. Payments were generally inadequate to cover living expenses. Nearly every state had a maximum allowable allowance ranging from 9 dollars to 15 dollars per month (approximately $120 to $275 in 2021 dollars) for the first child and 4 dollars to 10 dollars for any additional children. In practice, payments were often smaller than the statutory maximum; in 1931, the median mothers' pension was $21.87 per month, and ranged from an average of $4.33 per month in Arkansas to $69.31 a month in Massachusetts. As a consequence of the low payments, mothers receiving mothers' pensions tended to work outside of the home, despite the intention of many reformers that mothers' pensions would enable mothers to stay out of the workforce.

=== Eligibility ===
Mothers' pensions came with a number of eligibility criteria and generally required lengthy and intrusive application processes as well as supervision by case workers. In jurisdictions with adequate supervisory personnel, social workers visited mothers every month. In most states, pensions were restricted to widows, though some states gave aid to mothers whose husbands had deserted them, were physically or mentally incapacitated, or were incarcerated. Additionally, in a small number of states relatives or guardians other than mothers were eligible for aid if they were the primary caretaker of a dependent child. Aid was extended only to those who lived in deep poverty. Mothers had to satisfy state-residency requirements, typically mandating that they have lived in the state they are receiving benefits for at least one to three years; generally, there was no citizenship requirement to receive aid. Pensions most often cut off once the child reached the age of 14 or 16. In some southern states, black mothers were excluded from benefits by law.

Most states also included subjective character requirements. In Maine, for instance, laws governing mothers' pensions required a potential recipient to be "a fit and capable person to bring up her children, and whether the inmates and surrounding of her household are such as to render it suitable for her children to reside at home". These character requirements were sometimes used in racially or ethnically discriminatory ways; black mothers, for instance, were often racistly judged to be of poor character, while immigrant mothers could be faulted for speaking a language other than English in the home. Case workers also sometimes required mothers to turn down or quit full-time jobs to satisfy their belief that the mother should spend more time at home with her children.

Local authorities would sometimes make arbitrary judgements on eligibility. For example, a 1930 study of mothers' aid in Kansas found that a local official had temporarily revoked a mother of six's aid because they believed she needed to be "disciplined" for having grown too confident and, in the view of the official, coming to feel that the county owed her the allowance.

== Administration and funding ==
Administration was primarily local and practices varied widely across states. Generally, the administration of aid fell to juvenile courts but sometimes was fulfilled by county boards. In the 1920s, however, there was a tendency to hand administration over to county welfare agencies even if the law stipulated that juvenile courts were to handle administration. Social workers or private charities were often contracted out to supervise recipients and run proper-home investigations.

Localities were the primary source of funding, though most states had some cost-sharing mechanism through which the state covered a portion of the costs.

== Coverage ==
While mothers' pensions provided aid to many poor widows, they never reached a majority of poor children. Contemporary estimates placed the number of needy children in families receiving mothers' pensions at about one-third. As described by feminist scholar Gwendolyn Mink:

Pensions reached only a fraction of potential beneficiaries...Cultural and economic impediments to eligibility, inadequate funding, weak implementation requirements, and administrative discretion all played parts in limiting the scope of pension coverage. Local option provisions created programs that were unevenly administered and distributed even within states.

Underfunding plagued many localities' pension programs. In 1922, for instance, cities like Denver, Pittsburgh, and Cincinnati maintained waitlists for eligible mothers that were larger than the number of mothers receiving aid. And because mothers' pensions universally excluded families in which an able-bodied father was present—regardless of family income—many of the most impoverished families were excluded.

Because funding and administration of mothers' pensions were generally left to localities, there existed significant disparities in aid availability between counties, even within the same state. For example, in 1920 the maximum monthly aid given to a mother with three dependent children was $20 in Kansas City, $45 in St. Louis, and $32 in most of the rest of Missouri. Since the state laws instituting mothers' pensions often made them optional for counties, mothers' pensions probably reached no more than 60 percent of the counties legally entitled to grant them. Broadly, western, urban-midwestern, and urban-northeastern counties were significantly more likely than southern and rural counties to operate mothers' pension programs, and were more likely to devote greater funds to them.

== History ==
The movement to institute mothers' pensions emerged during the Progressive Era, a period of widespread social activism and political reform spanning the 1890s to the 1920s. Progressive reformers stressed the importance of family preservation (which contrasted with the consensus only a few decades earlier that extremely poor families, who were viewed as culturally and morally deficient, should be broken up and their children put into institutions, where they would be raised to appreciate middle-class values). This led to an effort to provide poor mothers with an income that would ensure they could care for their children in their own homes. Women made up the core force backing mothers' pensions, with women's civic organizations lobbying for them, women's magazines promoting them, and the expansion of voting rights to women (which culminated with the Nineteenth Amendment in 1919) making politicians more mindful of policies beneficial to women. Private charity organizations made up the bulk of the opposition to mothers' pensions.

The earliest attempt to provide pensions to mothers occurred in New York, when in 1898 the New York legislature passed a bill that would have given widowed mothers in New York City an allowance equal to the cost it would take to institutionalize their children; this bill, however, was vetoed by the governor at the behest of private charity organizations. The first successful statewide mothers' pension program did not come for another 13 years, when the state of Illinois introduced a mothers' pension in 1911. The following decade saw an explosion of mothers' pension programs, with thirty-nine states plus Alaska and Hawaii adopting them by 1919. By the time mothers' pensions were made redundant by the federal Aid to Dependent Children program in 1935, 46 states had adopted them.

However, because counties had a significant degree of control over the administration of mothers' pensions, at no point did more than half of all counties in the United States provide mothers' pensions. There were also large disparities in the size of mothers pensions, with the least generous states like Louisiana distributing only a few cents per capita while the most generous states, like New York, distributed 82 cents per capita. There were also large disparities between urban and rural benefits, with urban areas having the most generous mothers' pensions.

Mothers' pensions were a rare area in which the United States pioneered welfare policy. In most sectors of welfare politics, the United States lagged behind Western European countries, which had instituted social welfare policies like old-age insurance decades before the United States. Indeed, mothers pensions succeeded at a time when most proposals for old-age, health, and unemployment insurance failed in the United States. Those programs, however, were all directed towards the breadwinning male wage earner; the United States led the way in "maternalist" benefits, which included mothers' pensions, limits on women's hours of work, minimum wage laws for female workers, and government agencies staffed principally by women (the United States Children's Bureau).

=== Background ===
Mothers pensions' arose during the Progressive Era, and dovetailed with simultaneous efforts to improve working conditions for women and children, reduce or abolish child labor, and extend the right to vote to women. In a period in which it was not unusual for poor mothers unable to provide for their children to give them up to orphanages or adoption agencies, of chief concern to advocates of mothers' pensions was the desire to protect poor women from family separation and to protect their children from institutionalization. Correspondingly, the most frequent argument for mothers' pensions was the "sanctification of 'mother's love' and of the home" and an indictment of the conditions of orphanages.

The promotion of family preservation broke with earlier policies of deliberate family separation. In the late 1800s, a consensus existed that pauperism was culturally transmitted from parent to child, and so governments and private charities sought to separate children from their poor parents and raise them in institutions that instilled supposedly middle-class values. This view began to fall out of favor in the early twentieth century, however, as Progressive ideas that poverty was often attributable to social inequities rather than personal defects began to gain wider acceptance. Additionally, the expansion of the foster care system and the increasingly widely held view that children required individual attention contributed to the declining perception of child institutionalization. Accordingly, a new consensus that home life was superior to institutionalization began to take hold among child welfare experts. A resolution released by The White House Conference on the Care of Dependent Children, held in 1909, for instance, embodied this turn. It argued:

Home life is the highest and finest product of civilization. It is the great molding force of mind and character. Children should not be deprived of it except for urgent and compelling reasons. Children of parents of worthy character, suffering from temporary misfortune and children of reasonably efficient and deserving mothers who are without the support of the normal breadwinner, should, as a rule, be kept with their parents...Except for unusual circumstances, the home should not be broken up, for reasons of poverty.

While breaking with earlier views on family separation, mothers' pensions still drew heavily on a longstanding preoccupation with distinguishing the "deserving" from the "undeserving" poor. Married women, who had husbands who could in principle provide income for the family, were generally viewed as undeserving of material aid. Widows and single mothers who had lost their husbands to desertion, illness, or incarceration, by contrast, were viewed as objects of public sympathy, especially given the prevailing cultural view that women should not be members of the workforce. Still, eligibility for mothers' pensions would come with a variety of restrictions in an attempt to limit them only to the most deserving, including the requirement that mothers live in extreme poverty. Most onerously, aid was restricted to mothers of "good character" (character requirements were omnipresent in welfare benefits of this era, both for men and for women); mothers who drank alcohol, lived with male partners out of wedlock, or were viewed as neglectful towards their children were often denied aid. Additionally, unmarried or deserted mothers were often made ineligible for aid out of a fear that it could encourage husbands to leave their families.

The mothers' pensions movement was substantially advanced by the evident inadequacy of private charity and existing public relief in providing for the poor (especially during the Panic of 1893). Charity organizations, dependent on private fundraising, simply lacked the resources necessary to cope with mass dependency.

Finally, there was a newfound focus on the welfare of children, attributable to evolving views of the place of children in society. Throughout most of early United States history, children were economically productive members of the family, performing tasks like assisting with work on the family farm or bringing in income through factory work. By the mid-19th century, however, middle-class children had lost most of their economic utility and spent increasingly long periods of time in school. This led to an evolving view of the place of children in society, from contributory members of the family to dependants who had to be cared for. This view accelerated in the early 20th century, as working-class urban children (who had remained economically productive for longer than children in higher-income families because industrialization had introduced many jobs that could be performed by children) were gradually removed from the labor force by compulsory education, child labor laws, and decreased usefulness in industrial settings.

=== Early efforts ===
At the beginning of the 20th century, public aid for dependent children in their own homes began to emerge as an alternative to private charity and existing forms of outdoor relief. The first significant effort to provide a mothers' pension came in New York, when in 1898 the New York legislature passed a bill that would have given widowed mothers in New York City an allowance equal to the cost of institutionalizing their children. However, under pressure from private charity groups, which opposed the measure, the governor vetoed the bill.

Over the next decade, an increasing number of measures intended to benefit widows with dependent children were introduced. As outlined by historian Mark H. Leff:

In 1906, the juvenile courts in some California counties liberally interpreted laws to furnish county aid to children in their own homes, and in 1910 the attorney general of New Jersey took a similar step. Oklahoma in 1908 established "school scholarships," paid from educational funds to children of widows; and in the early months of 1911 Michigan enacted a comparable law for indigent children. None of these laws explicitly recognized state responsibility for support of dependent children in their own homes. Nevertheless, it is clear that the public distinguished widows' aid from other public relief.

Private efforts also began to emerge in the form of widows' scholarships. Certain organizations, especially the National Consumers' League and groups within the General Federation of Women's Clubs, began to offer scholarships to poor mothers commensurate with the wages their children would have earned had they been in the workforce rather than in school. Though limited in scope, these provided a prototype from which public policy could be modeled.

One of the most important events spurring the creation of mothers' pensions was The White House Conference on the Care of Dependent Children, held in 1909. President Theodore Roosevelt opened the conference by discussing the plight of widows unable to support their children. At the conclusion of the conference, the participants released a resolution calling for mothers' pensions (though expressing a preference for private charity). According to Leff, "This resolution, though expressing a preference for privately funded mothers' pensions, catalyzed the drive for public legislation. Soon a stream of people declared their advocacy of pensions for mothers."

=== Reformist judges and the first mothers' pensions ===
The first mothers' pensions were passed in 1911, when the state of Illinois introduced a mothers' pension and Missouri introduced one in Kansas City. These earliest mothers' pension programs were spearheaded by reformist juvenile court judges, who were dismayed by laws mandating that they remove children from homes when mothers could not earn a living and who believed poor children should be able to stay in school rather than enter the workforce. The Missouri mothers' pension, for instance, arose almost entirely due to the efforts of Judge. E. E. Porterfield of the Juvenile Court of Kansas City, while the Illinois pension was quietly engineered as an amendment to juvenile court legislation by Juvenile Court Judge Merrit W. Pickney.

=== Support and opposition ===
While the efforts of reformist judges led to the first mothers' pensions, it was women who made up the principle element of the mothers' aid movement. National mass-circulation women's magazine, especially The Delineator, helped to spread the idea of mothers' pensions to the public. Women's federations and other civic groups, especially the National Congress of Mothers and to a lesser extent the General Federation of Women's Clubs, lobbied for them. And, following the adoption of the Nineteenth Amendment to the United States Constitution, which extended the right to vote to all women, politicians felt greater pressure to cater to the interests of female voters. In the view of sociologist and political scientist Theda Skocpol, it was the association of mothers' pensions with elite and middle-class married women—who dominated women's civics organizations—that enabled the mothers' pension movement to transform from "an idea initially sponsored by a few juvenile court judges into a national social movement and legislative reality".

Mothers' pensions also had institutional support from the United States Children's Bureau, created in 1912 and staffed primarily by women. According to historian Barbara Machtinger, the Bureau "played a significant federal advocacy role for mothers’ pensions". It "provided leadership and guidance to recipients and local administrators and, in the process, helped forge a network of support for this new public policy. Most important, the Bureau financed and studied local administration, and as a result of its investigations, developed a reform agenda to improve the policy and practice of this early form of public provision to single-mother families".

Despite public sympathy for widows and a broadly held view that family preservation should be encouraged, advocates for mothers' pensions faced some opposition. Notably, however, mothers' pension faced limited opposition from business interests—who made up the core force opposing most forms of public aid—in large part because they had minimal effect on business costs and did not significantly affect the supply of labor. Still, advocates of mothers' pensions confronted a decades-long opposition to government-provided public relief. In the late-1800s, social workers and private charity had challenged the system of local and state government-provided outdoor relief, contending that direct relief bred dependency and pauperization—that it was a "pathological parasitism that would inevitably create a new class of dependents". Believing that only private philanthropy, which "combined relief with careful investigation and diagnosis of each case", could prevent pauperization, these critics led a campaign that successfully abolished outdoor relief in a number of major cities and replaced it with a system of scientific charity, which focused on character development.

When attention turned to mothers' pensions, private charity once again made up the bulk of the opposition to direct relief, with the social historian Roy Lubove noting that "the clash between the voluntary agencies and the advocates of mothers' pensions was among the bitterest ever to arise in American philanthropy". Charity organizations assailed the detriments to personal character mothers' pensions supposedly encouraged; the New York Charitable Organization Society (COS), for instance, argued that programs like mothers' pensions "fostered that degradation of character manifested in pauperism". Charity organizations also extolled their own form of scientific charity and warned that mothers' pensions were a form of "State socialism" that would ultimately lead to other forms of direct assistance, like free food and government-provided old age pensions. Privately, charity workers also worried that direct relief posed a threat to the agencies that employed them.

Despite this opposition, proponents of mothers' pensions "overwhelmed" the opposition. According to political scientist Christopher Howard, "The combination of ideological shift and interest-group pressure produced a rapid burst of legislative activity". Additionally, mothers' pensions benefited from the perception that they entailed little to no increase in state fiscal or administrative capacity, since the costs of pensions were comparable to the costs of breaking up destitute families and institutionalizing poor children in orphanages and poorhouses.

=== Expansion of mothers' pensions ===
Mothers' pensions proliferated rapidly after 1911. In 1912, the year after the first mothers pensions were passed in Illinois and Missouri, a number of counties in Colorado introduced their own mothers' pensions. In 1913, a mass of legislation emerged. In that year alone, 27 of the 42 state legislatures in session considered them, and 17 passed laws introducing them. This brought the total number of states with pensions for mothers in 1913 to twenty (sixteen in the West or Midwest). Over the next decade and a half, most states followed in introducing mothers' pensions, and almost always by nearly unanimous votes. By 1915, twenty-nine states were providing pensions to mothers; by 1919, it was thirty-nine, plus Alaska and Hawaii (which at the time were United States territories); by 1930, 46 states had mothers' pension programs (only Georgia and South Carolina did not offer them). In 1931, $33 million (approximately $595 million in 2021 dollars) was expended on mothers' pensions, with over 93,000 families receiving assistance.

From 1911 to 1935, there was also a general trend of expanding the classes of women and children eligible for aid. For instance, by 1931 only two states restricted aid exclusively to widows, and over the period a number of states raised the age limit of eligible children.

== Legacy ==
Mothers' pensions were the precursors to the federal Aid to Dependent Children (ADC) program created by the Social Security Act of 1935 (ADC was later modified and renamed Aid to Families with Dependent Children (AFDC) and in 1997 replaced by Temporary Assistance for Needy Families (TANF)). After the passage of the Social Security Act, mothers' pension programs were folded into ADC. According to the historian Linda Gordon, "The whole experience of mothers' aid, from its conception to the evaluation of its administration, helped congeal a particular view of public welfare which conditioned, more than any other single factor, the future shape of ADC".

While ADC brought cash payments to poor mothers under a national framework with certain minimum requirements, and had the federal government partially fund aid to poor mothers for the first time, it left administration and important decisions about eligibility and benefit levels to state and local officials. Consequently, ADC benefit levels varied substantially between states, as they had with mothers' pension programs. ADC carried over many of the eligibility requirements of mothers' aid programs, including restrictions on income, age limits, and the "suitable homes" provisions, which restricted public aid only to those deemed to be of good character. ADC, however, led many states to expand payments beyond widowed mothers to other relatives of dependent children if they are the primary caretaker (only a small number of states allowed this under their earlier mothers' pensions programs).

More broadly, according to the social historian Roy Lubove:

The mothers' pension movement was a liberating, innovating force in American social welfare...The mothers' pension movement had successfully challenged the philanthropic division of labor which attributed to public agencies a marginal, negative function, and removed some of the stigma attached to public outdoor assistance.

However, he also noted that the mothers' pension movement "failed in the opportunity presented to modernize the public welfare system. Local administration perpetuated the Elizabethan poor-law tradition..; the willingness and ability of local jurisdictions to pay, rather than need, determined the substance of the program".

There was also a substantial transformation in the public perception of aid to poor mothers over the rest of the twentieth century. Mothers' pensions had begun as a cutting edge reform with broad support and little attached stigma. Over time, however, public opinion soured on cash payments to poor mothers. ADC would, in the words of political scientist Christopher Howard, "come to symbolize everything that is wrong with the American welfare state".

== Effects ==
A study of mothers' pensions recipients in Chicago found that mothers did better under mothers' pensions than they did when previously dependent upon private charity. A study published in the American Economic Review analyzing data collected on over 16,000 boys from 11 states who were born between 1900 and 1925 and whose mothers applied to the Mothers' Pension program determined that receiving a mothers' pension increased life expectancy of the benefiting child by one year on average.

== See also ==
- Sheppard-Towner Act
- Protective laws
- Women in the workforce
- Poorhouse
- Widow's Pension
