= Widowed Parent's Allowance =

Social benefit in Britain

Widowed Parent's Allowance is a benefit under the United Kingdom Social Security system.

== Entitlement ==
It replaced Widowed Mother's Allowance in 2001 as part of the process of removing sex discrimination from the Social Security system. It is available to anyone with a child whose husband, wife or civil partner has died. The claimant must get Child Benefit for at least one child and the late husband, wife or civil partner was their parent.

It is not available if the partners were divorced at the time of death, if the claimant is in prison, if they remarry or are cohabitating with another person by means of living together as a married couple.

== Amount of benefit ==
In 2013 the maximum payment is £108.30 a week. It is taxable, but it is not affected by the receipt of other income. It is counted in full for all means-tested benefits. The amount payable is dependent on the National Insurance contributions paid by the deceased. It could be affected by the benefit cap. It continues while Child Benefit continues.

== Proposed changes ==
In July 2013 it was reported that the government was planning changes in the Pensions Bill 2012 going through parliament, which would limit this benefit to a maximum of £400 a month paid out for just 12 months, with a lump sum of £5,000 following bereavement. The 43,500 families already in receipt of the allowance would be unaffected by the reforms. The Department for Work and Pensions estimated that in 2016 the government expects to pay £590m a year to bereaved couples and families. With the changes, payments would drop to £530m by 2020.

For deaths after 6 April 2017, Widowed Parent's Allowance was replaced by Bereavement Support Payment.
