= Widow's pension =

Payments to widows

A widow's pension is a payment from the government of a country to a person whose spouse has died.

Generally, such payments are made to a widow whose late spouse has fulfilled the country's requirements, including contribution, cohabitation, and length of marriage.

== United States ==
During the Progressive Era, there was a proliferation of laws introducing widows' pensions (generally called "mothers' pensions") at the state level.

At the federal level, the widow's pension was introduced in the Senate in 1930. It was not especially uncommon for young women in Arkansas to marry Confederate pensioners; in 1937 the state passed a law stating that women who married Civil War veterans would not be eligible for a widow's pension. The law was later changed in 1939 to state that widows born after 1870 were not eligible for pensions.

In 1899, Congress approved a payment of $11,750 of widow's pension owed to Harriet Tubman.

== United Kingdom ==
In the United Kingdom, the Widow’s Pension was discontinued in 2001. A widow's pension can be paid to childless widows aged 45 or over, or to those whose husband died before September 4, 2001.

When it was offered, for a woman to qualify, her husband had to have paid 25 flat-rate contributions before April 6, 1975.

== Israel ==
In Israel in 2007, a court ruled that the female partner of a deceased lesbian was entitled to a widow's pension.

== New Zealand ==
In New Zealand, a widow's pension was introduced in 1911 to help families with no other way of supporting themselves.
