= Bereavement Support Payment =

UK social security benefit

In the United Kingdom, Bereavement Support Payments (also known as bereavement benefits) are paid to the husband/wife or partner of a person who has died in the previous 21 months. It replaced Bereavement Payment and Bereavement Allowance in April 2017, which had previously replaced Widow's benefit in April 2001.

It is a social security benefit that is designed to support people who have recently lost their spouse, and need some financial support to help them get back on their feet. A similar benefit is provided in Malta in accordance to the Widows and Orphans Pension Act of 1927.

The qualifying conditions are as follows:

- the deceased partner must have paid National Insurance contributions for at least 25 weeks in one tax year since 6 April 1975.

Bereavement Support Payment consists of 2 parts, firstly:

- a bereavement payment of £3,500 which is a one off tax free lump sum, provided the claimant was receiving Child Benefit; otherwise the payment is £2,500

(formerly only payable if the deceased spouse met the National Insurance contribution conditions, and was not receiving a Category A State pension).

Secondly:

- the succeeding benefit:
1. a standard rate (equivalent to the former Bereavement allowance), which is payable to surviving partners without children. This runs for up to 18 months from the date of claim or until the claimant reaches retirement age (whichever is sooner).
2. a higher rate (equivalent to the former Widowed parent's allowance). This is payable to surviving partners who have dependent children for whom they are in receipt of child benefit. This allowance is payable for up to 18 months from the date of claim.

None of these benefits are payable if the claimant is over state pension age. However, remarriage no longer affects any claim in payment. A person can move from the standard to the higher rate if they begin receiving Child Benefit after the claim has been made.

Bereavement Support Payment does not affect other benefits for a year after the first payment. After a year, remaining money left from the first payment can affect claims for other means-tested benefits.

== See also ==
- Funeral payment
