= Widowed Mother's Allowance =

British social benefit

Widowed Mother's Allowance was part of the United Kingdom system of Social Security benefits.

It was established under the National Insurance Act 1946 and abolished and replaced by Widowed Parent's Allowance in 2001. William Beveridge's view was: "There is no reason why a childless widow should get a pension for life; if she is able to work, she should work. On the other hand, provision much better than at present should be made for those who, because they have the care of children, cannot work for gain or cannot work regularly".

== Main conditions ==
The widow had to be receiving Child Benefit for a child who was either hers and her late husband's, or a child the husband was entitled to Child Benefit for before his death, or a child of hers by an earlier marriage which ended by her being widowed, if she was living with her late husband when he died, or she was expecting a child of her late husband's (a child conceived by artificial insemination counts if she was living with her husband after that),

Or a person under 19 lives with her who would fit into the previous category, but didn't get Child Benefit at the time because he or she was abroad when the husband died.

The amount was £77.45 a week in 2004 if the husband's contribution record was sufficient. It was possible to get a reduced rate of benefit and an earnings-related component.

The benefit lasted as long as the children qualified her for it. The main benefit was taxable but the increase for children wasn't.

The husband must have paid at least 52 times the minimum National Insurance contributions in any tax year before he died, and he must have paid contributions for sufficient years out of his working life. It was taken into account in full for all benefits.

There was an addition of £11.35 a week for each child after the first, for whom £9.55 was payable.

== See also ==
- Widowed Parent's Allowance
