= Elterngeld =

European state child support scheme

Elterngeld (German: [ˈɛltɐnˌɡɛlt]; translated literally from German as "parents' money") is a tax-financed payment for couples which pays an amount of money to support the costs of bringing up a child. Modern Elterngeld schemes originated in Germany and have been adopted in France and across Scandinavia.

It generally does not provide full support of the costs of bringing up a child. It is only provided for a limited period, ranging from until one year after birth until 18 years of age in Norway. The amount of Elterngeld granted depends in some places on the income of the parents.

== Need for ==
The need for Elterngeld schemes is illustrated by the declining birth rates in Western European countries. For instance, in Germany the present birth rate is 1.3 children per woman, which is below what is calculated at the economically stable rate of 2.1 children per woman. Twenty-five European Union states currently have birth rates below this level. The issues behind the declining birth rate include the higher costs of maintaining a child, and the greater dependence within the household budget economically on women.

== Criticism ==
Elterngeld is effectively a third state-level subsidy for some parents—on top of maternity allowance and state income benefits. Economists argue that this has created a complex and costly system of state benefit which could be simplified and reduced in expenses.

Economists and critics also argue that the allowance creates shifting birth patterns. In December 2006, media reports suggested that German parents were seeking ways to delay the births of their children until 1 January 2007, so that they would gain access to Elterngeld of up to 25,200 euros (two thirds of their former salary for up to a year), up from 7,200 euros per annum.

== Countries ==
- Germany – up to 25,200 euros for up to 14 months (two thirds of their former salary with a minimum at 300 euros and a cap at 1,800 euros per month, each parent can receive the payment for a maximum of 12 months) from 1 January 2007 on See more: Elterngeld (Germany)
- France – an allowance of 750 euros per month for one year from September 2005. The money is focused on existing parents producing more children than on first-time parents, with present discussion around allowances for third children. This has meant a higher birth rate at lower cost to the state than in other countries. The French government's goal is to raise the birth rate from 1.9 children per woman to at least 2.1 children per woman
- Sweden – up to one year at 80 percent wage-level compensation. Further four months can an overall basic amount be paid. Additionally the parents may shorten their work time without wage adjustment over up to two hours daily, until the child is eight years old. The increase of the birth rate in Sweden is attributed to this practice. Most other Scandinavian countries follow similar percentage level of salary Elterngeld payment levels
- Norway – up to two years at 80 percent wage-level compensation, or alternatively for 42 weeks at 100 percent (this is for maternity leave, not monthly payment until age of 18)
- Finland – parents' money is paid for nine months
- Denmark – for at least six months

== Elterngeld and gender ==
Several proposals have been offered to use Elterngeld-style payments to combat the effects of sex-selective abortion in Asia.
