= Family cap =

The family cap denies mothers and families who receive welfare assistance further financial assistance after the birth of another child.

It applies to some of the United States and in some other countries, such as South Korea and Singapore.

== United States ==
Traditionally, each family member is entitled to an allotment of welfare benefits. If a family had a child while receiving welfare assistance the grant amount would increase moderately. However, that changed in 1992 with New Jersey being the first state to implement a family cap. Currently, about 12 states have some type of a family cap or child exclusion.

=== Federal government ===
Under the 1996 federal welfare reform, states have discretion to implement a family cap policy. States no longer need waivers, unlike before, to do so.

== Criticisms ==
Opponents argue that the policy negatively affects children's poverty levels and health and also increases abortion rates.

=== Abortion ===
There are conflicting studies on the abortion issue. A 1998 study conducted in New Jersey found that for new welfare recipients there was an increase of 14% in the abortion rate, but for ongoing cases of recipients, there was no significant difference in abortion rates cause by the policy. Between October 1992 and December 1996, the New Jersey family cap averted 14,000 births and caused 1,400 abortions that otherwise would not have occurred. The policy is thus criticised by the New Jersey Catholic Conference, pro-life organizations, the American Civil Liberties Union, and the National Organization for Women. However, in 2001, another study found that family caps are inconclusive regarding reductions of out-of-wedlock births, abortions, or the size of welfare caseloads.

In contrast, a study in Arkansas and Arizona found that there was no significant difference in birth rates. If in fact these policies correlate with a reduction in birth rates, the question remains whether they are caused by abortions or increased use of contraceptives.

=== Child poverty and health ===
Critics argue that the child exclusion policy keeps children in poverty by denying them the critical supports they need at a young age to become self-sufficient in adulthood. A decrease in family wealth usually leads to negative effects on children.

Specifically, family caps were found to increase the poverty rate of children by 13.1%. Also, critics argue that the costs of child exclusion exceed the savings. Nationally, the costs associated with child poverty total about $500 billion a year, the equivalent of 4% of the GDP.

The effect child poverty on health also raises concerns. Children living in poverty are 3.6 times more likely to have poor health and 5 times more likely to die from an infectious disease than children that are not poor. In the area of welfare sanctions, such as family caps, a termination or a reduction in benefits translates into a 50% higher risk of lacking nutritionally-adequate food, a 30% greater risk of hospitalizations for infants and toddlers than those whose assistance were not decreased, and a 90% higher risk of being admitted to the hospital during an emergency room visit. Also, the increased need for medical treatment is felt by the children and by society’s health expenditures.

Currently, there is an estimate of 108,000 families affected by the family cap in the United States.

== Advantages ==
Proponents of family caps argue that the policy serves as an economic incentive to reduce birth rates and encourage personal responsibility.

=== Reduced birth rates ===
Proponents argue that the policy would help improve contraceptive practices or increase abstinence from intercourse. However, as mentioned above, the effects on childbirth have been inconclusive. A New Jersey study found that there was an estimated reduction of 14,000 births. However, a 2001 study found that the effects of the family cap policies were inconclusive, without any finding of a reduction on out-of-wedlock birth, welfare caseload, or abortions.

=== Personal responsibility ===
States support the policy because family caps could limit the number of out-of-wedlock births and strengthen families by limiting the births of additional children.

Other benefits of the policy, as mentioned by the Governor of Mississippi, include a reduction of crime levels caused by fewer births from teenage mothers.
