= Child benefit =

Form of benefit

Female labor force participation rates by family benefits public spending

Child benefit or children's allowance is a payment which is distributed to the parents or guardians of children, teenagers and in some cases, young adults. Countries operate different versions of the benefit. Child benefit can depend on the number of children. A study found a child benefit at 10 % of income tends to increase fertility by between around 1 to 3%. The cost of raising a child including opportunity costs increases with income and depends on the number of children.

== Conditions for payment ==
A number of conditional cash transfer programs in Latin America and Africa link payment to the receivers' actions, such as enrolling children into schools, and health check-ups and vaccinations. In the UK, in 2011 CentreForum proposed an additional child benefit dependent on parenting activities.

== Australia ==
In Australia, the system of child benefit payments, once termed child endowment and currently called Family Tax Benefit, is income tested and linked to the Australian Income tax system. It can be claimed as fortnightly payments or as an annual lump sum. It may be payable for dependant children from birth up to the age of 24. Children 16 years or older may alternatively be eligible for Youth Allowance. Parents of dependant children under the age of 16 may also be eligible for Income Support Payments including Parenting Payment and Newstart Allowance for Primary Carers of Children.

On 1 July 2000 the Australian government introduced major changes to the tax system including the introduction of a broad-based Goods and Service Tax (a VAT), substantial income tax cuts, as well as major changes to assistance for families.

These changes to family assistance simplified payments, by amalgamating a number of different forms of assistance, and also provided higher levels of assistance, with reductions in income test withdrawal rates. The new structure combined twelve of the pre-existing types of assistance into three new programs of assistance. The two most important of these are Family Tax Benefit Part A, which assists with the general costs of raising children, and Family Tax Benefit Part B, which is directed to single income and sole parent families. The third programme is Child Care Benefit.

The Family Tax Benefit Part A is paid for dependent children up to 20 years of age, and for dependent full-time students up to the age of 24 (who are not getting Youth Allowance or similar payments such as ABSTUDY and Veterans' Children Education Supplement). It is essentially a two-tier but integrated payment directed to most families with children, with a higher rate for lower income families, including both those in work and receiving income support.

The maximum rate is paid up to a family income of $28,200, and is then reduced by 30 cents for every extra dollar of income, until the minimum rate is reached. Part-payment at the minimum rate is available up to a family income of $73,000 (plus an additional $3,000 for each dependent child after the first). Payments are then reduced by 30 cents in every dollar over that amount until the payment reaches nil.

To receive some Family Tax Benefit Part A, the maximum income levels are $76,256 a year for a family with one dependent child under 18 and $77,355 a year for a family with one dependent 18- to 24-year-old. These thresholds are lifted by $6,257 for each additional dependent child under 18 and $7,356 for each additional dependent 18- to 24-year-old.

Families receiving Family Tax Benefit Part A may also be eligible for extra payments, such as Rent Assistance if renting privately, the Large Family Supplement for four or more children, and Multiple Birth Allowance for three or more children born during the same birth.

Family Tax Benefit Part B provides extra assistance to single income families including sole parents - particularly families with children under 5 years of age. In a couple, if the secondary earner's income is above $1,616 a year, payments are reduced by 30 cents for every extra dollar of income. Parents receive therefore some Family Tax Benefit Part B if the secondary earner's income is below $10,416 a year if the youngest child is under 5 years of age, or $7,786 a year if the youngest child is between 5 and 18 years of age. There is no income test on the primary earner's income, so in the case of sole parents the payment is universal.

The previous entry referred to Youth allowance and Parenting Payment. These are income support payments for young people and for parents who are not employed and looking after children respectively.

== Canada ==
The Canada child benefit (CCB) is a tax-free monthly payment made to eligible families to help them with the cost of raising children under 18 years of age. Basic benefit for July 2019 to June 2020 is calculated as:

- 6,639 CAD per year (553.25 CAD per month) for each eligible child under the age of 6.
- 5,602 CAD per year (466.83 CAD per month) for each eligible child aged 6 to 17.

This amount is reduced for families with adjusted family net income (AFNI) over $31,120, based on AFNI and the number of children.

== Finland ==
From the 1920s there was a child benefit allowance that covered state workers with children. Near universal child benefit was introduced to Finland in 1948 by law, following the example of other Nordic countries. Benefit is paid for children until they are 17, and only for children who live in Finland. There is also a supplement for single parents. Benefit is paid through national Finnish Social Insurance institution (KELA). Åland has a different scheme.

Child benefit allowances in Finland starting from 1 Jan 2024.
1. child	94,88 €/month
2. child	104,84 €/month
3. child	133,79 €/month
4. child	173,24 €/month
following children	192,69 €/month
Single parents supplement for every child 73,30 euros. Children under 3 supplement 26€

== Hungary ==
In Hungary there are several forms of family support. Every person who has a work permit and lives permanently in Hungary is eligible for almost all of them.

=== Family allowance ===
One of them is called family allowance (Hungarian: családi pótlék) which is corresponding to the social program in other countries under the name child benefit. Its amount depends on the number of children. For families with one child it is 12,200 HUF, for families with two children 13,300 HUF and for families with three or more children it is 16,000 HUF per child per month. For single parents (parents who are raising their children alone) the amount of family allowance is 1,500 HUF more in the first and second categories and 1,000 HUF more in the third category. Family allowance is paid until the age of 18 or to the completion of secondary education. For children with disability the amount is 23,300 HUF and for disabled children of single parents it is 25,900 HUF.

Number of children	Monthly amount pro child for one parent in double parent household	Monthly amount pro child for single parent household
1 child	12,200 HUF (32.49 €)	13,700 HUF (36.48 €)
2 children	13,300 HUF (35.41 €)	14,800 HUF (39.41 €)
3 or more children	16,000 HUF (42.60 €)	17,000 HUF (45.27 €)

If the child misses more than 50 school hours without permission, the family allowance will be suspended until the child re-fulfills his/her school attendance obligation properly. In the case of pre-school age children, family allowance will be suspended in case of an unjustified absence exceeding 20 days of education.

The government has no plans to raise child benefit, but the amount of the tax benefit will be doubled by 2026.

=== Family tax benefit ===
The other one is called family tax benefit (Hungarian: családi adókedvezmény) which is a tax reduction for families according to the number of children living in the household. Its amount can be maximal 10,000 HUF for parents with one child, 15,000 HUF for parents with two children and 33,000 HUF for parents with three or more children per month. There are no differences between single and double households or between families with one or two parents employed.

Number of children	Monthly maximal tax saving pro child for one parent
1 child	10,000 HUF (26.63 €)
2 children	20,000 HUF (53.25 €)
3 or more children	33,000 HUF (79.88 €)

People get family allowance and family tax benefit at the same time, so it is also common to count them together as a kind of child benefit.

== Ireland ==
Child Benefit (Sochar Leanaí) is payable to parents of children under 16 years of age, or under 18 years of age if they are in full-time education, Youthreach training or has a disability. The payment is paid by the Department of Social Protection. The monthly payments are as follows:

Number of children	Monthly rate
Per child	€140.00

Multiple births are a special case. In the event of twins, 150% of the monthly payment is paid for each child. Triplets, or more, are paid the double (200%) rate each; provided that all of them remain qualified (i.e. stay in further education until 19). In addition, a special 'once-off' grant of €635 is paid on all multiple births. Further 'once-off' grants of €635 are paid when the children are 4 and 12 years old respectively.

Fraudulent claims of Child Benefit are treated very seriously, and can result in large fines or prison for up to 3 years.

== Luxembourg ==
=== Family allowance ===
The government, through the Caisse pour l'avenir des enfants (Children's Future Fund), pays €299.86 per month per child. The allowance is universal and is not means-tested.

When a child is 6 years old, the amount increases to €322.53 per month.

When a child is 12 years old, the amount increases to €356.43 per month.

The family allowance is paid until the child is 18, unless they continue in education, in which case it is paid until the adult child ceases being enrolled at an educational institution or is 25 years old, whichever happens first.

==== Supplement for disabled children ====
The family allowance amount is increased by €200 per month for children who have a permanent disability causing them to lose at least 50% of their physical or mental capacity in comparison to a child of the same age with no disabilities.

=== Back-to-school allowance ===
In addition to the family allowance, a lump-sum back-to-school allowance is paid once a year in August for every child aged 6 or over enrolled at a primary or secondary school or college.

The allowance is €115 every August per child over 6 years old and under 12 years old.

The allowance is €235 every August per child over 12 years old until their schooling comes to an end.

== Netherlands ==
The Netherlands has one of the lowest child benefits (Dutch: kinderbijslag) in Western Europe.

In 2021, the amount per child per month is: 74.46 euros for children aged 0 to 5 years; 80.41 euros for children aged 6 to 11 years; 106.37 euros per month for children from 12 to 17 years.

In comparison to the Netherlands, its neighbour Germany pays 3 times more per month with lower income tax.

Kindgebonden budget

In addition to these general child benefits, there's a benefit depending on household income. For a household income up to 70.000 (single) or 99.000 (two parents), the "kindgebonden budget" is (2021) up to:

Number of children	Monthly maximal kgb
1 child	100.33 €
2 children	185.50 €
3 children	262.08 €
Additional children	76.58 €

Inkomensafhankelijke combinatiekorting

If a household has a child less than 12 years of age and the parent with the lowest income has an income of more than 5.154 euro per year (2021), he or she receives a tax deduction of up to 2.815 euro per year (234,58 per month, 2021).

== New Zealand ==
New Zealand has a tax rebate system known as 'Working For Families', which are allocated to families based on income and the number of children. A report in 2012 by the children's commissioner Dr Russell Wills recommended New Zealand adopt a universal child benefit, which the-then National government rejected.

In 2018, the Sixth Labour Government introduced a new universal BestStart Payment of $60 per week for parents with newborn dependents.

== Poland ==
There are two forms of parents financial support. The first one is tax cut. It was introduced in early 2000s. One of parents can deduct it from their annual personal tax settlement. Currently it is PLN 92,67 (€19) monthly for first and second child, PLN 166,67 (€35) for the third and PLN 225 (€47) for each next child. There is no possibility to use it when parents are not subject for personal income tax in basic form (e.g. that excludes some alternative forms of taxation in small business). There is also an income limitation if there is only a single child. The limit is PLN 56,000 (€11,700) per year per each parent. The tax cut is possible for parents of children up to 25 years provided that the child learns at school and child's annual income does not exceed a small limit (close to PLN 16,000, €3340 monthly).

Another form is direct payment for parents. The programme, named Family 500+ has been introduced in 2016 was created by the PiS government. Initially it was only for parents of more than one child, and the payment was 500 PLN (€116) monthly per child. The benefit base was a number of children minus one. Later on in 2019 it's been simplified and made more common: the benefit is paid for each child. From the very beginning the rate is constant and is PLN 800 (€187) monthly per child. The payment is not a subject of any income tax (e.g. cannot increase your income to excess the limit mentioned in above paragraph) and is paid unconditionally for children up to 18 years.

There is no research that proves any birth rate increase due to any of these forms of support.

== Spain ==
Between 2007 and 2010, Spain provided unconditional cash transfers to new mothers. The policy substantially increased the birth rate in Spain.

== South Korea ==
As of May 2021, any Korean family with a child aged between 0-7 receives 100,000 won per month in cash transferred to the parent's bank account from the Korean government, regardless of income or wealth. Finally, a debit card prepaid with 600,000 won is issued by the government to anyone pregnant or with a child in the country, which can be used for medical checks and initial upbringing costs. From January 2022, this debit card will be prepaid with an increased amount of 1 million won by the government.

From January 2022, 2 million won will be immediately paid to anyone giving their first birth in South Korea and the cash can be used for any purpose on top of receiving all of the various aforementioned benefits. 3 million won will be given for the second and further child. In addition, the additional bonus cash given to newborn babies aged 0–11 months will be raised to 1,000,000 won per month, and babies aged 12–23 months will receive 500,000 per month. Each parent will receive a paid holiday of up to 3 million won per month each for 3 consecutive months. Low income families who have a third child will have their children's university education fully paid for free by the Korean government.

== United Kingdom ==
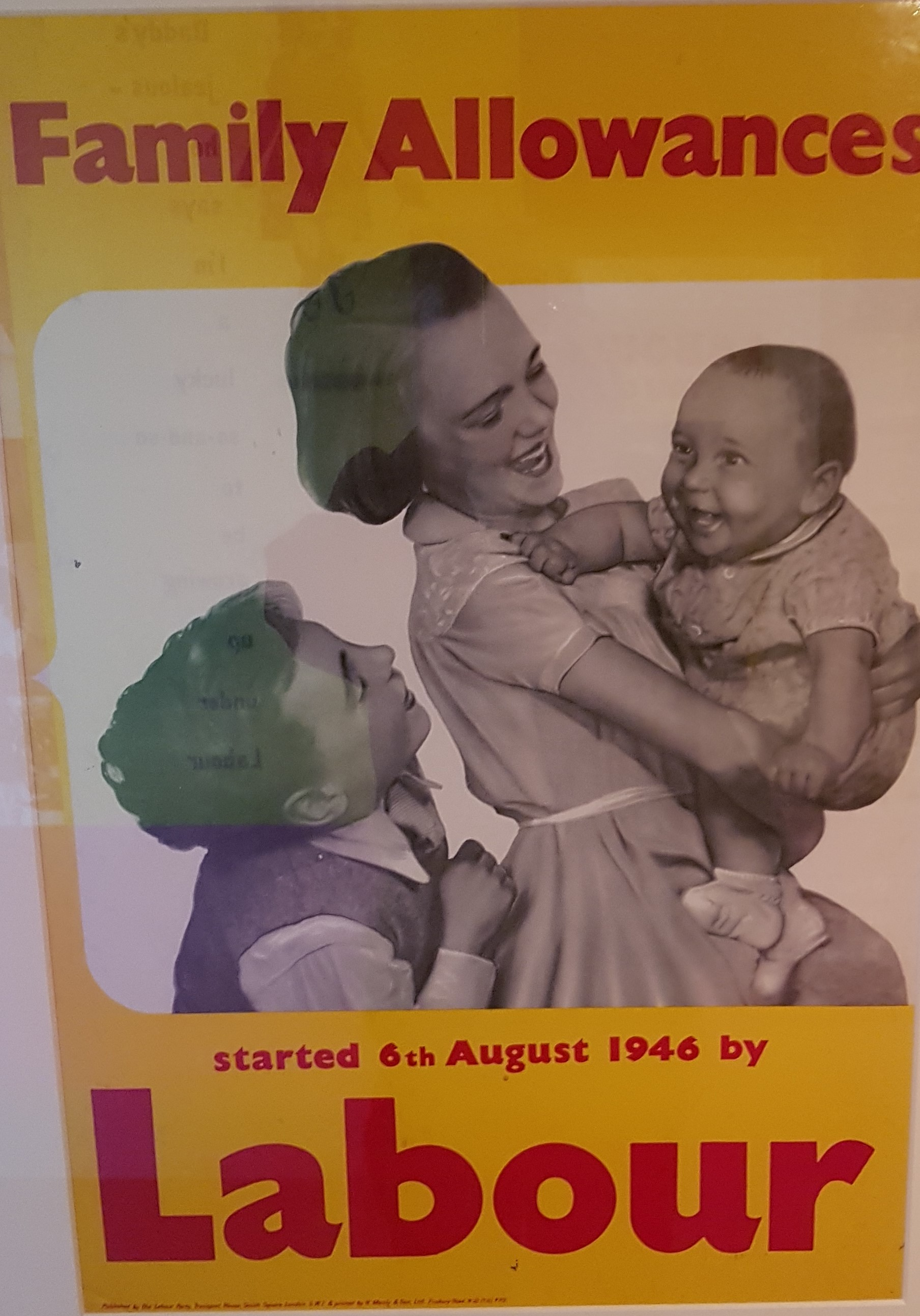
Family Allowances Labour Party poster

A minimum wage was introduced in Great Britain in 1909 for certain low-wage industries and expanded to numerous industries, including farm labour, by 1920. However, by the 1920s, "family allowance" targeted at low-income families was an alternative method, suggested by reformers, to relieve poverty without distorting the labour market. The trade unions and the Labour Party adopted this view. In 1945, family allowances were introduced; minimum wages faded from view until the National Minimum Wage Act 1998.

The system was first implemented in August 1946 as "family allowances" under the Family Allowances Act 1945, at a rate of 5s (= £0.25) per week per child in a family, except for the eldest. This was raised from September 1952, by the Family Allowances and National Insurance Act 1952, to 8s (= £0.40), and from October 1956, by the Family Allowances Act and National Insurance Act 1956, to 8s for the second child with 10s (= £0.50) for the third and subsequent children.

By 1955, some 5,000,000 allowances were being paid, to about 3,250,000 families.

It was modified in 1977, with the payments being termed "child benefit" and given for the eldest child as well as the younger ones; by 1979 it was worth £4 per child per week. In 1991, the system was further altered, with a higher payment now given for the first child than for their younger siblings. In October 2010, the Conservative-Liberal Democrat coalition government announced that Child Benefit would be withdrawn from households containing a higher-rate taxpayer from January 2013. After some controversy, this was amended so that any household with at least one person with prescribed income over £50,000 would lose Child Benefit by a taper which removed it altogether when the income reached £60,000. This came into force on 7 January 2013.

Today, child benefit is administered by His Majesty's Revenue and Customs (HMRC). As of June 2025, payment rates are £26.05 per week for the first or only child (including the eldest of a multiple birth) and £17.25 per week for each additional child.

== Comparison in Europe ==
(Note: The following numbers cannot be compared directly because of different preconditions and taxation systems.)These amounts are per month. (Note: The purpose of child benefits in Germany is to ensure that the subsistence level for a child is not taxed as required by the constitution. Therefore, child benefits are comparably high. When the taxes on the subsistence levels are deducted, an average of 50 euros per child remains, depending on the parent's income and taxation level. For low-level incomes, savings are highest; the level out around a taxable income of around 70,000 euros when there are 3 children.) (Note: Belgium has supplements depending on the social status of a parent (retired, unemployed, invalid). Parents receive benefits until the child reaches the age of 25, as long as the child is enrolled in higher education.) (Note: Amount depends on Canton and number of children.)

Belgium		Denmark		Germany	
1 child	€77.05	Each child age 0 - 3	€145	1 child	€250
2 children	€219.63	Each child age 3 - 7	€131	2 children	€500
3 children	€432.50	Each child age 7 - 18	€103	3 children	€750
Each additional child	€212.87			Each additional child	€250
Greece		France		Ireland	
1 child	€5.87	1 child	-	1 child	€140
2 children	€18	2 children	€120.32	2 children	€280
3 children	€40	3 children	€274.47	3 children	€420
4 children	€48	4 children	€428.62	Multiplier for twins	× 1.5
Each additional child	€8.07	5 children	€582.77	Multiplier for triplets and quadruplets	× 2
		Each additional child	€154.15		
Iceland		Italy		Luxembourg	
1 child (married parents)	€115.25	Annual income of parents up to €11,422.98	€250.48	Each child aged under 6	€271.66
2 or more children (married parents)	€137.17	Annual income between €27,693.04 and €30,403.39	€38.73	Each child aged 6–11	€292.19
1 child (single parent)	€191.92	Annual income above €43,962.05	No more payments	Each child aged 12 or over	€322.91
2 or more children (single parent)	€196.83				
Netherlands		Norway		Austria	
Children under 6 years	€58.11	Children under 6 years	NOK 1354 (€135)	First child aged under 3	€105.40
Children aged 6–11	€70.57	Children aged 6-18	NOK 1054 (€105)	First child aged 3-9	€112.70
Children aged 12–17	€82.02			First child aged 10-18	€130.90
				First child aged 19 or older	€152.70
				Second child	€12.80
				Each additional child	€25.50
Finland		Sweden		United Kingdom	
First child	€94.88 + 26€ for a child under 3 (Single parent increase €73,30 per child)	1 child	SEK 1,250 (€109)	First child under 16	£94.46 (€111.86)
2 children	€199.64 + 26€ for children under 3 (Single parent increase €73,30 per child)	2 children	SEK 2,650 (€230)	Each additional child	£62.61(€73.76)
3 children	€333.43 + 26€ for children under 3 (Single parent increase €73,30 per child)	3 children	SEK 4,480 (€390)		
4 children	€506.67 + 26€ for children under 3 (Single parent increase €73,30 per child)	4 children	SEK 6,740 (€586)		
5 children	€699.36 + 26€ for children under 3 (Single parent increase €73,30 per child)	5 children	SEK 9,240 (€803)		
Each additional child	€192.69 + 26€ for children under 3 (Single parent increase €73,30 per child)	Each additional child	SEK 2,500 (€217)		
Liechtenstein		Spain		Switzerland	
1 child	CHF 260 (€215)	Children under 18 (not-disabled)	€24.25	Child supplement per child (under 16)	CHF 200 to CHF 400 (€165 to €330)
Twins, or over 3 children	CHF 310 (€260)	Children under 18 (disabled)	€48.47	Education supplement per child (aged 16 – 25)	CHF 250 to CHF 525 (€210 to €440)
Each child aged 10 or older	CHF 310 (€260)	Children under 18 (disability >75 %)	€381.19		
		Children under 18 (disability >65 %)	€260.79		
Poland
Children under 18	PLN 800 (≈ €189; non-taxable)				

Map of monthly rate of child benefit in various European states for one, two and three non-disabled children raised by two parents (See description of map to more explanation.)

== See also ==
- Baby bonus
- Parental Leave
- Tax on childlessness
- Elterngeld
- Child tax credit
