= Residential care =

Long-term care provided in a non-home based residential place

Residential care refers to long-term care given to adults or children who stay in an institutional or semi-institutional residential setting rather than in their own home or family home.

There are various residential care options available, depending on the needs of the individual. People with disabilities, mental health problems, Intellectual disability, Alzheimer's disease, dementia or who are frail aged are often cared for at home by paid or voluntary caregivers, such as family and friends, with additional support from home care agencies. However, if home-based care is not available or not appropriate for the individual, residential care may be required.

== Child care ==
Children may be removed from abusive or unfit homes by government action, or they may be placed in various types of out-of-home care by parents who are unable to care for them or their special needs. In most jurisdictions the child is removed from the home only as a last resort, for their own safety and well-being or the safety or others, since out-of-home care is regarded as very disruptive to the child. They are moved to a place called a foster home.

=== Residential schools ===
A residential school is a school in which children generally stay 24 hours per day, 7 days per week (often called a boarding school). There is divided opinion about whether this type of schooling is beneficial for children. A case for residential special schooling has been advanced in the article: Residential special schooling: the inclusive option! in the Scottish Journal of Residential Child Care, Volume 3(2), 17–32, 2004 by Robin Jackson.

=== Residential child care ===
This type of out-of-home care is for orphans, or for children whose parents cannot or will not look after them. Orphaned, abandoned or high risk young people may live in small self-contained units established as home environments, for example within residential child care communities. Young people in this care are, if removed from home involuntarily, subject to government departmental evaluations that include progressions within health, education, social presentations, family networks and others. These are referred to as life domains within the charter of Looking after Children (LAC). Recent trends have favored placement of children in foster care rather than residential settings, partially for financial reasons, but a 1998 survey found that a majority of out-of-home children surveyed preferred residential or group homes over foster care.

=== Child disability care ===
Children may be placed or taken into care because they have a mental, developmental, or physical disability, often referred to as "special needs". A team of teachers, therapists, and caregivers look after the children, who may or may not go home to their parents at night or on weekends. Conditions and disabilities such as Autism, Down syndrome, epilepsy and cerebral palsy (to name a few) may require that children receive residential professional care. Specialized residential can be provided for children with conditions such as anorexia, bulimia, schizophrenia, addiction, or children who are practicing self-harm.

=== Foster care ===
Children, including children with special needs, may be cared for in a licensed foster care home. Foster care entails the young person or young people going to live with a family that is not biologically related to the young persons/people. Special training or special facilities may be required to foster a child who is medically fragile - for example, a child who has a serious medical condition or is dependent on medical technology such as oxygen support.

=== Care leavers ===
Any adult who has spent time in care can be described as a "care leaver", especially in European countries. In England, a young person from age 16 onwards who has left local authority care is a "care leaver", entitled in an assessment of their needs and continued support from the local authority.

== Adult care ==
=== Adult disability care ===
Adults may live in an adult residential facility because of a disability, often a mental disability such as Down syndrome or autism, which can make them unable to take care of their daily needs.

=== Geriatric care ===
Various forms of long-term residential care are available for elderly people. A person or couple who are able to take care of their daily needs may choose to live in a retirement apartment complex ("independent living") where they function autonomously. They may choose to prepare their own meals or have meals provided, or some combination of both.

Many residential facilities are designed for elderly people who do not need 24-hour nursing care but are unable to live independently. Such facilities may be described as assisted living facilities, board and care homes, or rest homes. They typically provide a furnished or unfurnished room, together with all meals and housekeeping and laundry service. Depending on the needs of the resident they also provide assistance with daily activities such as personal hygiene, dressing, eating, and walking. They are not considered to be medical facilities, but they have to meet state standards for care and safety.

Nursing homes, also known as rest homes or skilled nursing facilities, are intended for people who need ongoing medical care as well as help with daily activities. Nursing home populations have been decreasing in the United States, despite the increase in the elderly population, because of the increasing availability of other options such as assisted living.

Continuing care retirement communities provide several types of care – typically independent living, assisted living, and skilled nursing – in one location, with the resident being able to move from one level of to another as their needs dictate. This is often referred to as 'Aging in Place'.

=== Hospice care ===
Hospices provide a form of medical care for people with a terminal illness or condition, for example, cancer. Care in a hospice is generally offered when a person is very close to death. Most hospices offer a choice of residential (nursing home) or in-home (supportive) care. A hospice emphasizes a palliative rather than curative approach; the patient is made comfortable, including pain relief as needed, and both patient and family are given emotional, spiritual, and practical support.

== Mental illness ==
=== Psychiatric hospital care ===
People may be detained under the laws that state that they have to be sectioned in certain circumstances. In the United Kingdom, at least 2 doctors can sign a paper to get this to happen. Patients have to be a risk to themselves, property or other people to warrant being sectioned; this can include suicide attempts.

Some patients may volunteer to go to a psychiatric hospital because they recognize that they are ill.

Treatment can occur against the patient's wishes if this is needed and that can be with the use of drugs. The patients are generally detained until doctors believe that they are stable enough to leave.

=== Rehabilitation unit care ===
People who are addicted to drugs or alcohol may be voluntarily or involuntarily admitted to a residential rehabilitation facility for treatment. Prescribed drugs are sometimes used to get people off illegal or addictive drugs, and to prevent the withdrawal symptoms of such drugs. The length of stay may be determined by the patient's needs or by external factors. In many cases the patient's insurance will cover such treatment in private facilities for only a limited period of time, and public rehabilitation facilities often have long waiting lists.

== Levels of care ==
=== Total care ===
Total care is when a resident or patient requires a caregiver in order to have all their survival needs met, including ambulation, respiration, bathing, dressing, feeding, and toileting.

The term "total care" is sometimes incorrectly used in nursing homes and other similar facilities to refer to a patient who simply needs diaper changes, but is able to provide other care on his/her own.

=== Self care ===
The term "self care" is used to refer to a resident or patient who resides in a caregiving facility, but is able to meet one's own needs, such as ambulation and toileting, and only requires a caregiver for occasional assistance.

== See also ==
- Child abandonment
- Child abuse
- Child and family services
- Child and Youth Care
- Community-based care
- Community integration
- Cottage homes
- Family support
- Group homes
- Kinship care
- Orphanage
- Residential treatment center
- Supported living
- Supportive housing
- Teaching-family model
- Wraparound (childcare)
