= Group home =

Residence for those with complex health needs

A group home, congregate living facility, care home (the latter especially in British English and Australian English), adult family home, etc., is a structured and supervised residence model that provides assisted living as well as medical care for those with complex health needs. Traditionally, the model has been used for children or young people who cannot live with their families or afford their own homes, people with chronic disabilities who may be adults or seniors, or people with dementia and related aged illnesses. Typically, there are no more than six residents, and there is at least one trained caregiver there 24 hours a day. In some early "model programs", a house manager, night manager, weekend activity coordinator, and four part-time skill teachers were reported. Originally, the term group home referred to homes of 8 to 16 individuals, which was a state-mandated size during deinstitutionalization. Residential nursing facilities, also included in this article, may be as large as 100 individuals in 2015, which is no longer the case in fields such as intellectual and developmental disabilities. Depending on the severity of the condition requiring one to need to live in a group home, some clients are able to attend day programs and most clients are able to live normal lifestyles.

== Facilities ==
Because group homes are usually ordinary suburban houses, often tract housing, modified for handicap access and care, the bathrooms in homes are typically shared. In bigger houses, there is typically a group therapy room.

The group homes highlighted in news articles in the late 1970s and 1980s, and by the late 2000s, have been cited internationally as a symbol or emblem of the community movement. Group homes were opened in local communities, often with site selection hearings, by state government and non-profit organizations including the international in a broader array, spectrum, continuum, or services systems plan for residential community services or Long-Term Services and Supports (LTSS).

Another context in which the expression "group home" is used is referring to residential child care communities and similar organizations, providing residential services as part of the foster care system. There is a considerable variety of different models, sizes and kinds of organizations caring for children and youth who cannot stay with their birth families. Residents of group homes are responsible for their own conduct and are bound by an agreement to follow an expected list of house rules. Any disorderly conduct by group home residents, including fighting with other residents, damaging group home property, or another resident's personal property, or an inability to follow house rules or follow instructions from group home staff members can lead to a resident being kicked out of the group home.

== Types and models ==
A group home in a local community is what the government and universities term a "small group home". Group homes always have trained personnel, and administration located both for the home and outside the home at office locations. Larger homes often are termed residential facilities, as are campuses with homes located throughout a campus structure.

K.C. Lakin of the University of Minnesota, a deinstitutionalization researcher, has indicated that a taxonomy of residential facilities for individuals with intellectual disabilities includes program model, size and operator, and facilities also then vary by disability and age, among other primary characteristics. Prior residential facility classifications were described by Scheerenberger until the modern day classification by David Braddock on a state-by-state basis which includes individuals in residential settings of six or fewer, one categorical group. In 2014, models of residential services in intellectual disabilities include new categories of supported living, personal assistance services, individual and family support, and supported employment.

=== Residents and services ===
Residents of group homes usually have a disability, such as autism, intellectual disability, chronic or long-term mental/psychiatric disorder, or physical or multiple disabilities because those are the non-profit and state-regional organizations which began and operated the homes. Some group homes were funded as transitional homes to prepare for independent living (in an apartment or return to family or marriage and employment), and others were viewed as permanent community homes. Society may prevent people with significant needs from living in local communities with social acceptance key to community development. The residents sometimes need continual or supported assistance in order to complete daily tasks, such as taking medication or bathing, making dinners, having conversations, making appointments, and getting to work or an adult daycare service.

Group homes were revolutionary in that they offered individuals life opportunities to learn to cook and prepare meals (e.g., individuals with severe and even profound disabilities), budget their personal allowance, select photos for their room or album, meet neighbors and "carry out civic duties", go grocery shopping, eat in restaurants, make emergency calls or inquiries, and exercise regularly.

Some residents may also have behavioral problems that require a better daily routine, medical assessment for possible health care needs (e.g., pituitary problem, medication adjustment), environmental changes (e.g., different roommates), mental health counseling, specialist or physician consultation, or supervision; government may require a finding of involuntary care (i.e. dangerous to themselves or others) which is a hotly contested and disputed arena. Individuals who move from psychiatric hospitals (and intellectual disability institutions) also may need medications reduced, with psychiatric symptoms often only moderately addressed ("modest efficacy") in this manner with known side effects of long-term use. The community living movement has been very successful in the United States and other countries, and is supported in 2015 by the UN Convention on the Rights of Persons with Disabilities (UN, 2006).

Prior to the 1970s, this function was served by institutions, asylums, poorhouses, and orphanages until long-term services and supports, including group homes were developed in the United States. The primary frameworks in the United States underlying group homes are often termed social and functional competency-based (e.g., community participation, social role valorization, social and community acceptance, self-determination, functional home and community skills) and another, positive behavioral supports (which may be considered overly structured for homes and home life). Positive behavioral supports were developed, in part, to assist with "management problems" of the residential facilities. Group home residents may be found in workplaces, day services, parks and recreation programs, schools, shopping centers, travel locations, and with family, neighbors, community workers, co-workers, schoolmates and friends.

In addition, new laws required that schools serve disabled children (often obfuscated as "special needs" or "exceptional children") adapting school and afterschool programs to meet the needs of the previously excluded population groups. Douglas Biklen in his award-winning "Regular Lives" highlighted 3 schools in Syracuse, New York integrating severely disabled children in conjunction with his new book, Achieving the Complete School: Strategies for Effective Mainstreaming.

=== Residential treatment facilities ===
People who live in a group home offering support services may be developmentally disabled, recovering from alcohol or drug addiction (e.g., who may have attended a youth drug court hosted by the judicial system), abused or neglected youths, youths with behavioral or emotional problems, and/or youths with criminal records (e.g., a person in need of supervision). Group homes or group facilities may also provide residential treatment for youth for a time-limited period, and then involve return of the youth to the family environment. Similarly, drug, addictions and alcohol programs may be time-limited, and involve residential treatment (e.g., Afrocentric model for 24 women and children, as part of Boston Consortium of Services).

==== Residential treatment for children with mental health needs ====
Residential treatment centers and other organized mental health care for children with emotional needs, among our highest health and human service efforts, was reported at 440 organizations nationally in 1988, representing 9% of mental health organizations. Residential treatment centers were considered largely inappropriate for many of the children who needed better community support services. Restructuring of these systems was proposed to promote better prevention and family support for children in mental health systems similar to international initiatives in "individualized family support program". Residential treatment is one part of an array of community services which include therapeutic foster care, family support, case management, crisis-emergency services, outpatient and day services, and home-based services. During this period, residential treatment was also compared to supported housing, also called supportive housing for its role in comprehensive service system developments, though often for adults who may need or desire services.

=== Community resources and neighborhoods ===
Group homes have a good community image, and were developed in the intellectual disability and mental health fields as a desirable middle class option located in good neighborhoods after a faulty start in poorer neighborhoods in the United States. Group homes were often built in accordance with principle of normalization (people with disabilities), to blend into neighborhoods, to have access to shopping, banks, and transportation, and sometimes, universal access and design. Group homes may be part of residential services "models" offered by a service provider together with apartment programs, and other types of "followalong" services. However, in 2015, the homes and personnel continue to meet the challenges of a changing multicultural society, and changing and norms in areas such as gender expectations.

=== Halfway houses and intermediate care facilities ===
A group home differs from a halfway house, the latter which is one of the most common terms describing community living opportunities in mental health in the 1970s' medical and psychiatric literatures. Specialized halfway houses, as halfway between the institution and a regular home, may serve individuals with addictions or who may now be convicted of crimes, though very uncommon in the 1970s. Residents are usually encouraged or required to take an active role in the maintenance of the household, such as performing chores or helping to manage a budget. In 1984, New York's state office in intellectual and developmental disabilities described its service provision in 338 group homes serving 3,249 individuals. Some of these homes were certified as intermediate care facilities (ICF-MRs) and must respond to stricter facility-based standards.

Residents may have their own room or share rooms, and share facilities such as laundry, bathroom, kitchen, and common living areas. The opening of group homes in neighborhoods is occasionally opposed by residents due to ableist fears that it will lead to a rise in crime and/or a drop in property values. However, repeated reviews since the 1970s indicate such views are unfounded, and the homes contribute to the neighborhoods. In the late 1970s, local hearings were conducted in states such as New York, and parents of children with disabilities (e.g., Josephine Scro in the Syracuse Post Standard on June 7, 1979), research experts, agency directors (e.g., Guy Caruso of the Onondaga County Arc, now at Temple University) and community-disability planners (late Bernice Schultz, county planner) spoke with community members to respond to their inquiries. The late Josephine Scro later became a director of a new family support agency in Syracuse, New York, to assist other families with children with disabilities with family supports in their own homes and local communities, too.

=== Foster care and family support for children ===
A group home can also refer to family homes in which children and youth of the foster care system are placed, sometimes until foster families are found for them, sometimes for long-term care. Homes which are termed group foster care operate under other standards than those termed group homes, including different management systems and departments.

Unrelated children or sibling groups live in a home-like setting with either a set of house parents or a rotating staff of trained caregivers. Specialized therapeutic or treatment group homes are available to meet the needs of children with emotional, intellectual, physical, medical and/or behavioral difficulties.

Group homes for children provide an alternative to traditional foster care, though family support to the birth, adoptive, and foster families are often first recommended. Several sources state that, in comparison to other placement alternatives, this form of care is the most restrictive for youth in the foster care system. The term group home is often confused with lock-down treatment centers, which are required to have eyes-on every so often due to behavioral and intellectual disabilities of the children and youth they serve. There are also less restrictive forms of group homes, which often use the house parent model. Those organizations are due to their visual comparability to several foster families within a certain area as well as their connectedness to each other, the community and internally best described as residential child care communities.

Group homes and foster homes have been compared and studied in national samples. Group homes were studied as part of a national sample of community living for individuals with severe disabilities, and small group homes six or under were among the recommended options, often for adults.

=== Supportive community options for adults with disabilities ===
Newer options of group living were often termed supported living, supported housing, individual and family supports, or early on, "individualized supportive living arrangements" (e.g., apartment programs). These developments often followed analyses of homes as homes, ordinary housing and support services, versus group treatment or facilities, an important critique during the 1980s and 1990s reform period. Independent living continued to be a primary framework representing another emblem of community living more often associated with personal assistance and live-in attendants, home health services, and the now termed allied health services of physical and occupational therapy, speech, cognitive therapy, and psychological counseling. However, leading psychiatric survivors examined independent living in the context of supportive housing and necessary support services which did not need to be congregated in housing.

=== Group options for seniors with disabilities ===
Perhaps the largest group of group homes (now termed community residential services or residential care by other managements) fall under the heading of residential care homes for seniors, or both seniors and individuals with disabilities. Residential care categories include over 43 separate regulated categories by state governments and now have the new assisted living growing in the United States. Group (e.g., funded as large as 100 individuals in a nursing facility or on old-style campus of over 12 wards on the outskirts of cities) or homes for seniors (e.g., room and board) are designed for seniors who cannot live on their own due to physical or mental disabilities. Group facilities, which may involve over half of the allotted beds or more (80%) funded by Medicaid, might also be found under Residential Care Home, Residential Care Facility for the Elderly, or Assisted Living Facility. Alternative community options for these seniors are home health care, hospice care, specialized care (e.g., Alzheimer's), day care at senior centers, meals on wheels, transportation drivers, and other aging and disability options.

== Civil rights ==
In most countries, people can still vote in election and attend higher education while in a group home. However, Internet usage in group homes may be severely limited (if not prohibited outright). Trips to public libraries may vary depending on the distance from the group home to the library. While 93% of the Canadian population has easy access to a public library, it is uncertain about the percentage of Canadian group home residents who actually have unrestricted access to a public library in lieu of watching television.

=== Employment and the Americans with Disabilities Act ===
Employment opportunities, where available, are encouraged for group home residents, depending on the home, operator, and characteristics of the residents. Since the 1970s, people with cognitive or mental health disabilities have been involved in community employment of all kinds and also have developed freestanding affirmative industries and supported employment services in conjunction with the government. These rights are protected under the Americans with Disabilities Act of 1990, later revised in 2008. Human rights laws, still operational in states, govern employment applications for employment, and the employer is restricted from asking pre-employment questions on criminal arrests or discriminating on this basis (See, Human Rights Laws of the state of New York). However, unbeknownst to many communities and organizations, management rights, instead of human rights, have been inserted in contracts in the United States.

=== Mental health and civil rights ===
In the United States, it has been the position of state mental health commissioners that many people who are living independently should be placed in intensive treatment, as described in a mid-1980s article in the Community Mental Health Journal. The authors held that only 12 of 3,068 individuals should be living independently (p. 199) based on their model predictions. In contrast, the continuum model has been critiqued as restrictive of rights, facility-based, and restrictive of community participation resulting in a US Supreme Court decision recognizing the most integrated setting (Consortium of Citizens with Disabilities, 2012).

Increasingly, concern has been voiced over the rise in community treatment orders, medical homes, invasive supervision in homes, in addition to decades of outcry over involuntary procedures in psychiatry in the United States and restrictions on human rights. In this field, no viable recourse exists for reversing actions by personnel, including professional and medical malpractice, and the most successful programs are viewed as those that result in high compliance. High medication usage is required, often against the law, and the situation worsens during any police-enforced confinement. Group homes in the non-profit sector are often operated by other than the providers involved in state or private, for-profit involuntary care.

=== Nursing facility industry ===
The nursing facility industry holds the position, often with its affiliated hospitals, that it decides on involuntary treatment of elders, which involves issues such as visitations. Nursing homes have had a very long history of reviews and complaints including to the federal level of the Government Accountability Office (GAO) in the United States and have been the subject of major reform efforts. Today, a Red Cross ombudsman may be available in the homes, special needs units may be available to assist in areas such as bathing and eating, and in some cities, short term rehabilitation is provided for seniors at those sites instead of at community locations. Nursing facilities, unlike the small size standard of the Centers for Disease Control (CDC) for homes for individuals with intellectual disabilities, may have over 100 "institutional clients" on site and is reporting 2–3% restraint use.

== Education and training ==
Group home personnel are considered in 2015 to be Direct Support Professionals though paramount in this approach are maintaining a home atmosphere, routines, and community life. An abundance of literature in the 1980s and 1990s described the training needs of personnel, and today new expectations continue to occur as the homes become increasingly health care financed and more self-direction options become available.

=== Cultural and professional helping skills ===
Foundational in all helping professions are what are called "critical skill domains", which are congruent with a community support approach (e.g., values clarification, general fluency and flexibility of thought, perception and response, competence in academic content, verbal communications) (Cole & Lacefield, 1978). In addition, with the multicultural workforce, cultural awareness, even skills like using chopsticks, are desired in the adaptive skill domains and comparisons between fast food and sit down restaurants.

=== Community volunteers and participation ===
By the 1990s, greater emphasis was placed on community participation and belonging, in addition to welcoming support of the community and community members. In fact, several national research centers in the United States were funded, in part, on the basis of community research studies in community participation.

=== Special population groups ===
Education also occurs for special population groups or particular issues or needs; an example are the challenges gay men face in living with chronic illness including HIV-AIDS which may be addressed in supported housing options. Attention is also paid to developing residential services which meet the preferences of persons with serious mental illness and their families.

=== Independent living and brain/head injury services ===
Education and training in independent living from long-term care institutions (e.g., acute care facilities, long-term rehabilitation facilities, skilled nursing or intermediate care facilities, community re-entry facilities) often involved changing from forced dependency to controlling and deciding one's own destiny called self-determination. Life skills ranged from health and hygiene, parenting/child care, home maintenance, money management, activities of daily living, community awareness and mobility, legal awareness, social/interpersonal skills, and family involvement (Condeluci, Cooperman, & Self, 1987). These services may be called post-acute services, and involve other personnel models, such as life coaches (Jones, Patrick, Evans, & Wuff, 1991). Independent living training has also proved effective in addressing the needs and expectations of individuals who have sensory impairments (e.g., hearing or blindness).

== Cost of residential services ==
Residential services costs have been studied in depth in areas that relate to group homes, family care homes or community residential services, especially on deinstitutionalization, Medicaid home and community-based waiver development, and community development. Residential treatment, often provided in larger facilities, may be higher in reimbursement rates to the provider so treatment billings will be found for higher-cost professional services (e.g., behavioral health). Surprisingly, except for very small sizes, the larger, medicalized facilities bill the highest costs per individual (e.g., intermediate care facilities over 16 in the state of New York).

=== Individual and family costs of services ===
In relationship to the individual or family, residential services are expensive for low or middle-class families, and federal, state and local government often contribute to these costs. Medicaid-funded options may require use of assets, and Social Security Disability or Social Security are also part of payment plans. New options called family-directed and user-directed involve transfer of funds to homes and families, and continue to be in process in states. Early organizations provided information on their management and financing to help local communities replicate or begin their own homes and programs.

=== Residential care, assisted living, supported housing ===
Residential care homes, run by the government or by the for-profit and non-profit industries, need not be low cost and/or low quality as many might initially guess, though traditional room and boards may be based primarily on a Social Security Disability payment and limited governmental personnel assistance. More expensive residential care homes now exist to offer a family-style, high quality, care option to the next class of senior care which is Assisted Living Facilities. These homes, operated often by the nursing care industry, are based on increasing need for assistance and decreasing independence. Unlike the proposals for upgraded community services in homes and communities for seniors with substantial needs, assisted living was primarily developed as facility types only; supported housing also was a new model as state initiatives.

=== Seniors, disability and aging ===
There are various levels of residential care homes for seniors, which is the traditional medical system of assessments, which differs from developing person-centered plans and support services for persons who may have substantial health care needs and also from new managed Medicaid care plans. In addition, in some fields, the plan is for the individual to age in place in their group home setting. Personal care assistance is often associated with aging in place and independent living services; local governments have been reluctant to pay for other than limited services in the homes (one study stated up to 20 hours maximum, others 3–4 hours per week), in spite of a nationwide decades press toward our own governments. This position is similar to a governmental position to pay not for ordinary goods, but only for specialized services.

However, senior services of other kinds, including the senior centers, low cost meals, transportation, Veteran's health services and independent clubs, specialized day care (e.g., day care for older adult policies in Great Britain), local case managers, local Offices of the Aging (with Disability coordinators in some locations), and so forth are often available. Senior programs may also involve joint integration initiatives by aging and disability agencies resulting in leading programs such as social model day programs in Oneida County, New York, Rhode Island's Apartment Residence, Madison County Integration Program, and supported retirement programs in the state of Utah.

Assisted living is a modernization effort (e.g., more choices or menus of services) in the nursing care fields which primarily resulted in modernization, to some extent, of the large facility (i.e., nursing homes) or campus models. Large state initiatives can be found in Linking Housing and Services for Older Adults representing response to long-term criticism of a facility-based service industry. However, a recent nursing industry schema, reflecting a provider network, for levels of care states: "Assisted Living with No Assistance" (the most common use of "assisted living" involves little or no assistance, living at home with minimal amounts of home care), "Assisted Living with Assistance", and "Assisted Living - Memory Care". Memory care is for those dealing with memory loss, dementia, or Alzheimer's disease.

However, the call nationwide is for caregiving services in the homes where aging parents often move to live with their adult children and their families. The provider sector desired are those that respect the wishes of the individual and the family, including for care at home through hospice. The New Politics of Old Age Policy (Robert Hudson, 2005/2010) calls for the government entertaining care credits or generous minimum benefits to assist United States families to juggle paid and unpaid work in today's modernized world. In addition, as parents age, adults with disabilities who may be living at home will also need assistance that might not have been needed earlier (e.g., siblings, new home).

== See also ==
- Assisted living
- Child and family services
- Child and Youth Care (CYC)
- Community integration
- Community-based care
- Cottage homes
- Family support
- Foster care (see also Foster care in the United States)
- Halfway house
- Independent living
- Kinship care
- Orphanage
- Residential care
- Residential child care community, also known as a children's home
- Residential treatment center (RTC), also known as rehab
- Supported housing
- Supported living
- Teaching-family model (TFM)
- Wraparound (childcare)
