= Kinship care =

Raising of children by grandparents or extended family

Kinship care refers to the raising of children by grandparents, other extended family members, and unrelated adults with whom they have a close family-like relationship such as godparents and close family friends because biological parents are unable to do so. Legal custody of a child may or may not be involved, and the child may be related by blood, marriage, or adoption.

This arrangement is also known as kinship diversion, "kincare" or "relative care." Kinship placement may reduce the number of home placements children experience; allow children to maintain connections to communities, schools, and family members; and increase the likelihood of eventual reunification with birth parents. It is less costly to taxpayers than formal foster care and keeps many children out of the foster care system. "Grandfamily" is a term that refers to families engaged in kinship care.

== Kinship ==
=== Kinship children ===
According to the 2010 U.S. Census, almost 7.8 million U.S. children live in homes under kinship care. There are many reasons that a parent may be unwilling or unable to care for their child, including death, incarceration, illness, substance abuse and financial instability. Many kinship children are placed by child protective services (CPS) agencies after removing the child from the biological home. This can also happen in family court without CPS being involved. When CPS removes children, local children services will seek out relative placements before placing a child in non-relative foster care. Most kinship children have experienced some form of trauma that resulted in estrangement from their natural families. Kinship children may have been victims of abuse and neglect in the biological home, exhibit signs of post-traumatic stress disorder, have special needs or disabilities resulting from in utero substance abuse, be in need of counseling or other support services, or require specialized social and educational services.

In 2010, there were 7.8 million children who live in households where the heads were grandparents or other relatives and parents were not present. In 2012, according to the Annie E. Casey Foundation Kids Count Data Center, there were 2.7 million children or 4% of all children who are being raised by grandparents or other kinship care. According to a 2003 U.S. Census Bureau report, 2.4 million grandparents had primary responsibility for their coresident grandchildren younger than 18. Among grandparent caregivers, 39 percent had cared for their grandchildren for 5 or more years. 594,000 grandparents nationally are raising children below the federal poverty level. Relatives care for a quarter of all children in foster care in the United States.

=== Kinship caregivers ===
Kinship caregivers may be grandparents, great-grandparents, siblings, aunts, uncles, or family friends of the children in their care. Caregivers often feel responsible for extended family members and prefer to care personally for relative children who may otherwise end up in non-relative foster care. In many cases, grandparents and other relatives have not planned for the addition of children to the home, and may have problems accessing social and educational services that have changed drastically since they raised their own children. Some caregivers experience feelings of guilt and social isolation resulting from fear of the perception that one failed in raising one's own child. Caregivers may be hesitant to pursue legal custody of children in their care if they want to maintain relationships with the child's biological parent, or if they view the arrangement as temporary.

Grandfamilies face obstacles not encountered by biological parents such as obtaining medical and educational services for the children in their care and securing affordable housing in which they can live with the children. Many of the public assistance benefits available to birth parents and foster families are not available to kinship caregivers even if the child was receiving assistance in the parent's home. Some states offer "subsidized guardianship" payments for kinship families with children placed through children services agencies or foster care agencies, although these payments are substantially less than payments that non-relative foster families receive. Financial issues are common for many older grandparents and great-grandparents who are living on fixed incomes, Social Security or disability payments, who did not plan to raise children late in life, or who are raising children with demanding educational or medical needs. The prevalence of these financial issues has led to a high rate of food insecurity, job loss and home foreclosure in families who support additional children without adequate financial and service assistance. The obstacles can be even greater in "informal" care arrangements, where the relative caregiver lacks a legal relationship (such as legal custody or guardianship) with the child.

According to the 2000 U.S. Census, less than 20% of children raised by grandparents have legal custody arrangements. Some states have established avenues towards legal guardianship for grandparent caregivers who are informally caring for children. Ohio's HB 130, the Grandparent Affidavit and Power of Attorney Bill, establishes two legal mechanisms to assist caregivers to access educational and medical services for children in their residential care as an alternative to intrusive children services intervention or expensive legal processes. This type of temporary guardianship is preferred by families who hope for eventual reunification of birth parents and biological children.

Recent legislation, the Fostering Connections to Success and Increasing Adoptions Act of 2008 includes several provisions affecting kinship families. The legislation authorizes federal funding of subsidized guardianship payments, establishes kinship navigator programs to assist caregivers in accessing community assistance and support services for the children in their care, requires notice be given to adult relatives when a child enters care, and allows states more flexibility with licensing standards when placing a child with a relative.

The AARP and Generations United both maintain searchable online databases of kinship programs in the United States.

=== Types of Kinship care ===
There are four different types of Kinship care.

Informal kinship care means that living arrangement of the child was created by the parents and other family members without the help of the court or child welfare agencies. An example of this care could be if the parents are ill and can no longer care for their children, so a relative like a grandparent, aunt or uncle may care for the children until the parents recover.

Temporary guardianship occurs when the parent of a child plans to temporary leave their children with a relative. This type also requires the parents to consult an attorney and the attorney will write up papers to be sent to the court for a judge to approve. During this time of temporary guardianship, the relatives who were granted this type of kinship can make decisions for the children in the sectors of medical and education.

Voluntary kinship care occurs when the child was placed in the home or a relative and the child welfare agency is involved. Examples of circumstances that result in this type of kinship care include; if there are signs of abuse or neglect by the parents, and while parents are in treatment for substance abuse or mental health issues, parents can place their children with relatives with the help of child welfare workers.

Formal kinship care. In this type of kinship care, "the child is placed in the legal custody of the State by a judge and the child welfare places the child with family members." The state will remain having legal custody of the child and the relatives will have physical custody, which means they must support the child financially and give them a home. If the parents and relatives agree on the child visiting their parents or siblings, the child welfare agency is responsible for creating the visits and making sure that the visits happen. With this type of kinship care, the relatives become the foster parents of the child.

=== Mental development of children in kinship care ===
The first few years are crucial for early childhood, during which children develop rapidly. The relationships established with their caregivers predict children's later performance in social lives, marriage relationships and relationships with their own children. Therefore, it is important to understand the quality of kinship care in terms of mental development of children to see how these early relationships influence children socially, emotionally and cognitively and further impact school readiness.

Studies that have examined custodial kinship families have reported high prevalence of poverty and low educational levels compared with other family arrangement. As such, kinship caregivers are often associated with high level of strain when playing caring and rearing role to children. These obstacles are less energy, limited financial resource, and more health problems and concerns. Besides, psychological challenges include difficulties of re-entering parent roles, implementing effective disciplinary strategies, dealing with relationship among children, caregivers and biological parents, and overcoming a generation gap. These multi-aspect factors potentially influence children in kinship care and expose them to more mental health risks. A study of 733 custodial grandmothers and 9,878 caregivers from the 2001 National Health Interview Survey (NHIS) who completed the Strengths and Difficulties Questionnaire (SDQ) reported that children raised by grandparents have more behavioral and emotional disturbances than children in the overall U.S. population. Among the subjects, major Caucasian custodial grandparents reported more difficulties with the children than African American grandparents. The white grandparents often report their grandchildren with behavior problems of argumentative, impulsive and depressed characteristic, school withdraw, less independent, and low self-esteem, while black grandparents report their custodial children had lied or cheated, were disobedient at school, destroyed things, and got into fights）. Another study of 59 New York custodial grandparent families reported that more than half of the children have developed some level of health conditions, among the most common conditions were attention deficit disorders. Other studies found high incidence of behavioral problems of kinship care than other family arrangements. In school settings, children being raised by grandparents have higher rates of suspension and expulsion and lower engagement than children living with parents. A 2016 systematic review of 102 quasi-experimental studies involving 666,161 children found kinship care to be a viable option for the well being of children removed from home for maltreatment.

=== Strength of kinship care ===
Kinship care also has many sources of strength. Kinship families that often have a history of support create a more sustainable and stable emotional tie with children, and thus improve well-being of the whole family. Older caregivers tend to provide wisdom and knowledge gained through experience, gratitude for having a second chance at raising children, and having more time to spend with children.

In terms of well-being of children, it is important to help them building up personal and cultural identity. Children in kinship care are placed within a social class and culture familiar to them and have more contact with relatives who reinforce their self-identities, self-esteem and the sense of belonging with shared family history, routine and rituals. Also children in kinship care experience fewer placements than non-kinship care children, remain in the community they familiar with, and are exposed to less risk factors associate with unstable physical and mental environment. Besides, they have relatively more contact with their biological parents, from whom they receive compensative social and financial support than non-kinship care children. Kinship care children enjoy a functional social network from local community other than "cold-blooded" professional assistance by governmental department that associated with severe neglect before placement. A healthy and natural local community compensate for the poor utilization of medical and educational services due to low level of educational status of kinship parents, especially grandparents. It also lower the risks of receiving peer pressure, isolation, social stigma and enable children maintaining sustainable network in school and leisure settings.

For kinship care children who keep contact with their biological parents, biological parents continue playing their role in the relationships among kinship parents, biological parents and children. One study shows that 88% of teens being raised by a grandparent have some contact with at least one of their parents, whereas 64% of the children interviewed in another study saw their mother at least each year; many of these children's mothers lived nearby and had regular contact with their children. These studies indicate that biological parents' role can be disturbing, often seen as inconsistent involvement breaking up trust and confidence of children, legal wrangling and undermining grandparents' rules, leading to less effective parenting on the part of the grandparent.

=== Child Welfare System involvement with kinship care ===
The Child Welfare System and Kinship Care tend to go hand in hand in most cases. From state to state, the child welfare system are different from one another, but they always include departments that focus on social services or children's services. Each agency contains Caseworkers who are normally Social Workers who are required by law to help create a safe environment, better the well being and create permanent living arrangements for children. The involvement of the child welfare system in kinship care varies from State to State due to each state having their own laws and practices that govern these situations. A caseworker within the department of Social Services or Children's services will be the first to approach grandparents or other relatives when the individuals want to become a kinship caregiver. Families are also able to contact their local welfare agencies when seeking help. "

== Assistance for grandparents and relatives raising children ==
In many U.S. states, financial and service assistance programs that are available to birth parents and foster families are not available to kinship caregivers based on the family relationship to the child. Some states have more kinship support services in place than others, but the following financial assistance is available to qualified caregivers nationwide.

In the United Kingdom kinship carers get less help than people fostering or adopting children. Kinship carers can be pushed into debt, poverty, poor health or even homelessness. Judith Blake of the Local Government Association's children and young people's Board, said councils were "doing what they can" supporting kinship carers in the face of severe pressure on children's services' budgets. "Government needs to ensure that councils receive the long-term, consistent funding they need to make sure all children and families are able to thrive."

== Supportive services ==
The National Family Caregiver Support Program (NFCSP) became law in 2000 under the reauthorization of the Older Americans Act and provides funding for supportive services to grandfamilies. Reauthorized and amended in 2006, NFCSP provides federal funding for the U.S. Department of Health and Human Services, Administration on Aging (AoA) to administer the program. The AoA funds local Area Agencies on Aging (AAAs) to provide supportive services to grandparents and other relatives aged 55 and older who are relative caregivers of children. Supportive services fall into 5 categories designated by NFCSP:

1. information to caregivers about available services;
2. assistance to caregivers in gaining access to the services;
3. individual counseling, organization of support groups, training to assist the caregivers in the areas of health, nutrition, financial literacy, and in making decisions and solving problems relating to their caregiving roles;
4. respite care to enable caregivers to be temporarily relieved from their

caregiving responsibilities; and

1. supplemental services, on a limited basis, to complement the care

provided by caregivers.

=== Services available for kinship families ===
When fostering children or raising your relatives children it can become expensive. "According to the 2002 Urban League and the National Survey of American Families, over 50% of children in kinship care live in low-income housing."Depending on the families circumstances they may be eligible for the following services:

- The Temporary Assistance to Needy Families (TANF)- This program provides financial assistance for low-income families. The goal for this program is to help the families that use it, become self-sufficient.
- Food Stamps- This program helps families who are low-income afford groceries each month. The amount the families are eligible for are determined by the size of the family and their income.
- Supplemental Security Income (SSI)- This program helps children who are disabled in kinship care. The eligibility is based solely on whether the child is disabled, and helps with the living expenses of the child.
- Foster Care Payments- This program may be available to kinship families under certain circumstances and "the requirements for receiving these payments vary from state to state." Due recent changes and the passage of the Fostering Connections Act, states have more options when using title IV-E funds for kinship guardian payments.

== Funding ==
=== Child-only TANF funds ===
The federal government has set aside Temporary Assistance to Needy Families (TANF) funding in all U.S. states to support working families with children under a certain income level. While eligibility to receive regular TANF funds is dependent on a family's annual household income and employment status, a "Child-Only" version is available nationally. This Child-Only grant only takes into consideration the income level of the dependent child, not the work or income eligibility of the caregiver. Some sort of temporary or permanent custody is required through juvenile court, Children Services, or another foster care agency to apply for the TANF Child-Only grant. TANF funding can be obtained through county Job and Family Services facilities.

== Tax credits ==
Families must meet income requirements that depend on the number of children they are raising. Caregivers do not have to be the child's legal guardian or custodian, and the child doesn't have to be defined as the caregiver's dependent by the IRS. The child must be your biological child, grandchild, stepchild, foster or adoptive child, sibling, or a descendant of one of these. The child must have lived with you for more than half of the filing year and be under the age of 19, a full-time student under the age of 24, or totally disabled.

=== Child and dependent care credit ===
Child and Dependent Care Credit helps families who pay for child care so that they can work or look for work. The dollar amount of the credit depends on the number of children in the family, the annual household income, and the amount of money paid annually for child care. Caregivers do not have to be the child's legal guardian or custodian, but the child must be defined as the caregiver's dependent by the IRS.

=== Child tax credit ===
Child Tax Credit offers a tax credit of up to $1000 per child. The maximum income allowable to receive this credit is fairly high, so many families who are over-income for other programs may be eligible. The qualifying child must be younger than 17. Caregivers do not have to be the child's legal guardian or custodian, but the child must be defined as a dependent by the IRS.

=== Qualifications for Child Tax Credit ===
According to Turbo Tax, there are seven factors that determine who qualifies for the Child Tax Credit. First, the child must be under the age of 17 years old at the end of the tax year you are filing for. Second, the child must be related to the individual filing for Child Tax Credit. Examples of relationships are, "the child is their own child, stepchild or a foster child. When looking at other children within the individual's family, they can also claim brothers, sisters, stepbrothers and sisters and also nieces, nephews and grandchildren." When looking at the financial support the child has, "the child cannot be making more than half of their own income." This means, the child cannot be financially stable on their own, otherwise the individual filing for the Child Tax Credit may not qualify. The child must be your dependent, which means the individual filing for the tax credit must be supporting them financially throughout the tax year. The child must also be a United States Citizen. Another qualification is that the child must be living with the individual filing for more than 6 months out of the year the tax credit is being filed for. Lastly, the family income determines if the individual qualifies for the tax credit. The tax credit can be reduced if the income is above the recommended amounts. "For married couple filing separately the max is $55,000, $75,000 for single head of household or widow and for married couples filing together it is $110,000. For each $1,000 above the max income levels the tax credit falls by $50."

== See also ==
- Orphanage
- Residential Child Care Community
- Group homes
- Congregate Care
- Cottage Homes
- Family support
- Foster Care
- Foster Care in the United States
- Residential treatment center
- Residential Care
- Community-based care
- Child and family services
- Child and youth care
- Left-behind children in China
- Child abuse
- Child abandonment
- Wraparound (childcare)
