= Cottage homes =

Cottage homes are used in residential child care communities and other group homes.

Organizations using this model employ married couples, also referred to as house parents or cottage parents, who are living in a dwelling on campus, together with a certain number of children. These couples must go through in-depth and continued training each year. The goal is to model a positive family life and thereby teach children life, communication and interaction skills.

Several studies show the positive outcomes of this type of care. Significant improvements in academic achievements, behavior, psychiatric symptoms, relationship with the parents as well as a decrease in offense rates were found.

== History ==
From the 1870s, a number of charitable and poor-relief organizations in the United Kingdom who were involved in providing residential care for children began to make use of accommodation known as cottage homes. Rather than a single, large building which was then more typically used to house children in care, the cottage homes model placed them into family-style groups, typically of around 15–25 children. Each group lived in a 'cottage' (in reality, it was often a fair-sized house) under the care of an adult housemother (or a married couple as 'house-parents'). The family group principle was originally developed at the Rauhes Haus in Germany and at the agricultural colony for young delinquents at Mettray in France. The first example of its use in the United Kingdom was the Home for Little Boys, at Farningham, opened in 1865.

The cottage home developments constructed in the UK were often built in rural locations and in the style of a small village, with a number of the cottages arranged around a central green, or laid out as a village street. The sites usually included a school, infirmary, church, laundry, workshops, and sometimes a swimming bath.

Around 115 Poor Law Unions in England and Wales set up cottage homes accommodation for children in their care. Children's Charities that used cottage homes included the National Children's Home (sites at Harpenden, Frodsham and Bramhope) and Barnardo's (sites at Barkingside and Woodford Bridge).

It is estimated that, at their peak in the very early 1930s, there were beds for 15,000 children in cottage homes in England and Wales. From the time when they were built in the late nineteenth century up until 1950, it is thought that 175,000 children spent some or all of their childhoods in the cottage homes.

In 1967, the Teaching-family model was developed in the USA and used in juvenile justice. Boy’s Town, a residential child care community with campuses throughout North America, adapted and developed this model further.

== See also ==
- Child abandonment
- Child abuse
- Child and family services
- Child and Youth Care
- Community-based care
- Congregate care
- Family support
- Foster care
- Foster care in the United States
- Kinship care
- Orphanage
- Residential treatment center
- Wraparound (childcare)
