= Congregate care =

Congregate care may refer to:

- Congregate care in the United States
- Residential child care community
- Residential treatment center
