= Congregate care in the United States =

Type of temporary childcare institution

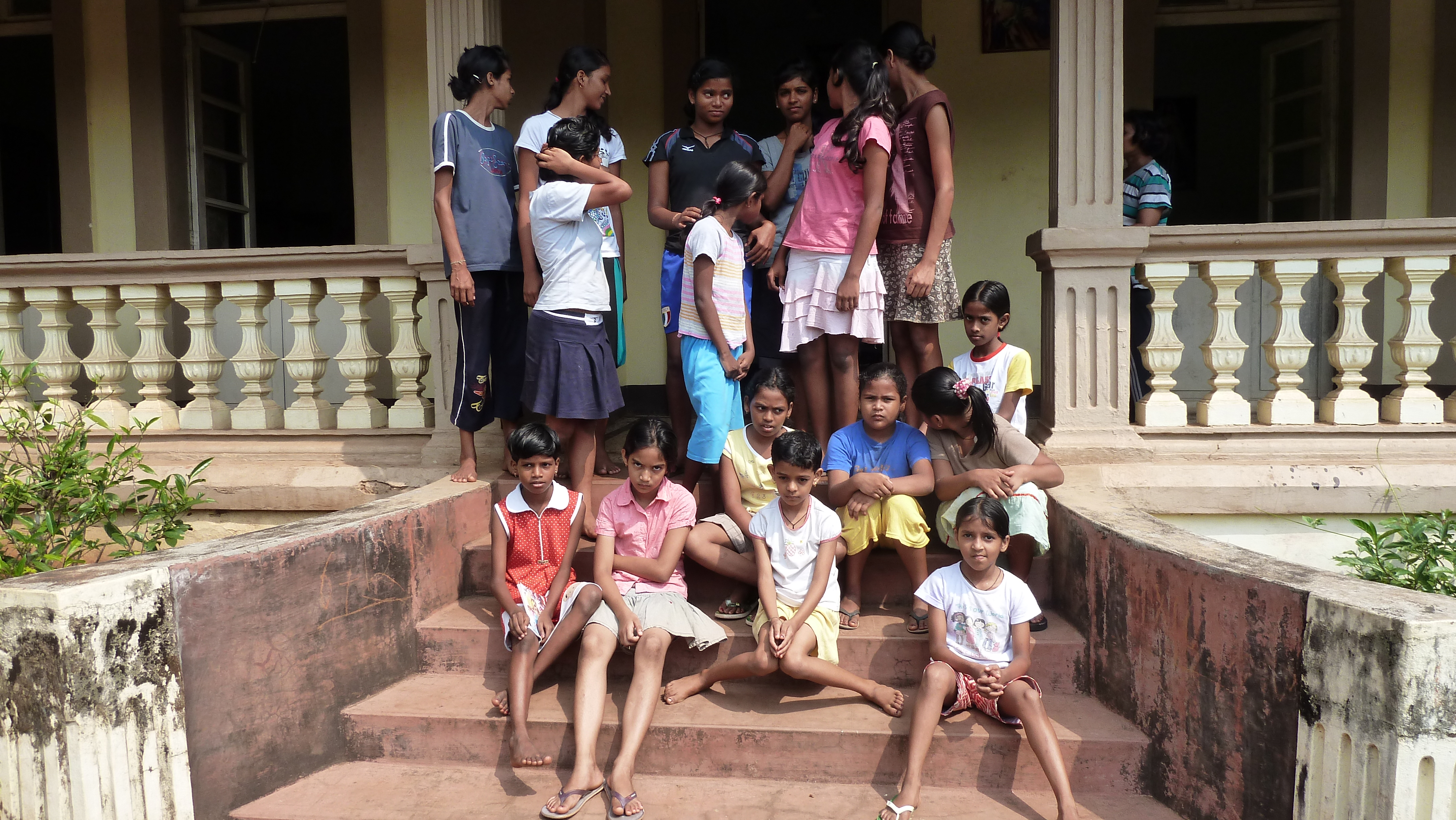
Foster children and teens gathered together on a porch

Congregate care is a kind of residential child care community and a residential treatment center that consists of 24-hour supervision for children in highly structured settings such as group homes, residential treatment facilities, or maternity homes. Such settings must be a licensed or approved home or facility that can accommodate 7–12 children, as seen in group homes, or 12 or more children, as seen in institutions. Fourteen is the average age of children who enter into congregate care. In the United States out of the 400,000 children in the foster care system around 55,000 live in congregate care settings. In the United States in 2013 there was 55,916 children in congregate care. In the last ten years, there has been a 37% decrease in the number of children in congregate care, which is greater than the overall 21% drop in number of children in the foster care system.

Among the options of placements for youth in the foster care system, congregate care settings are supposed to be used as a temporary placement, until youth are considered stabilized and ready for a family-like setting. Reports show that on average, youth spend anywhere around 8 months in congregate care). According to Title IV-E of the Social Security Act, children are required to have a case plan that aims to place them in the most appropriate and least restrictive settings that supports their wellbeing and needs. A 2015 report by the Department of Health and Human Services revealed that states are not consistently lessening the use of congregate care and that more information is required.

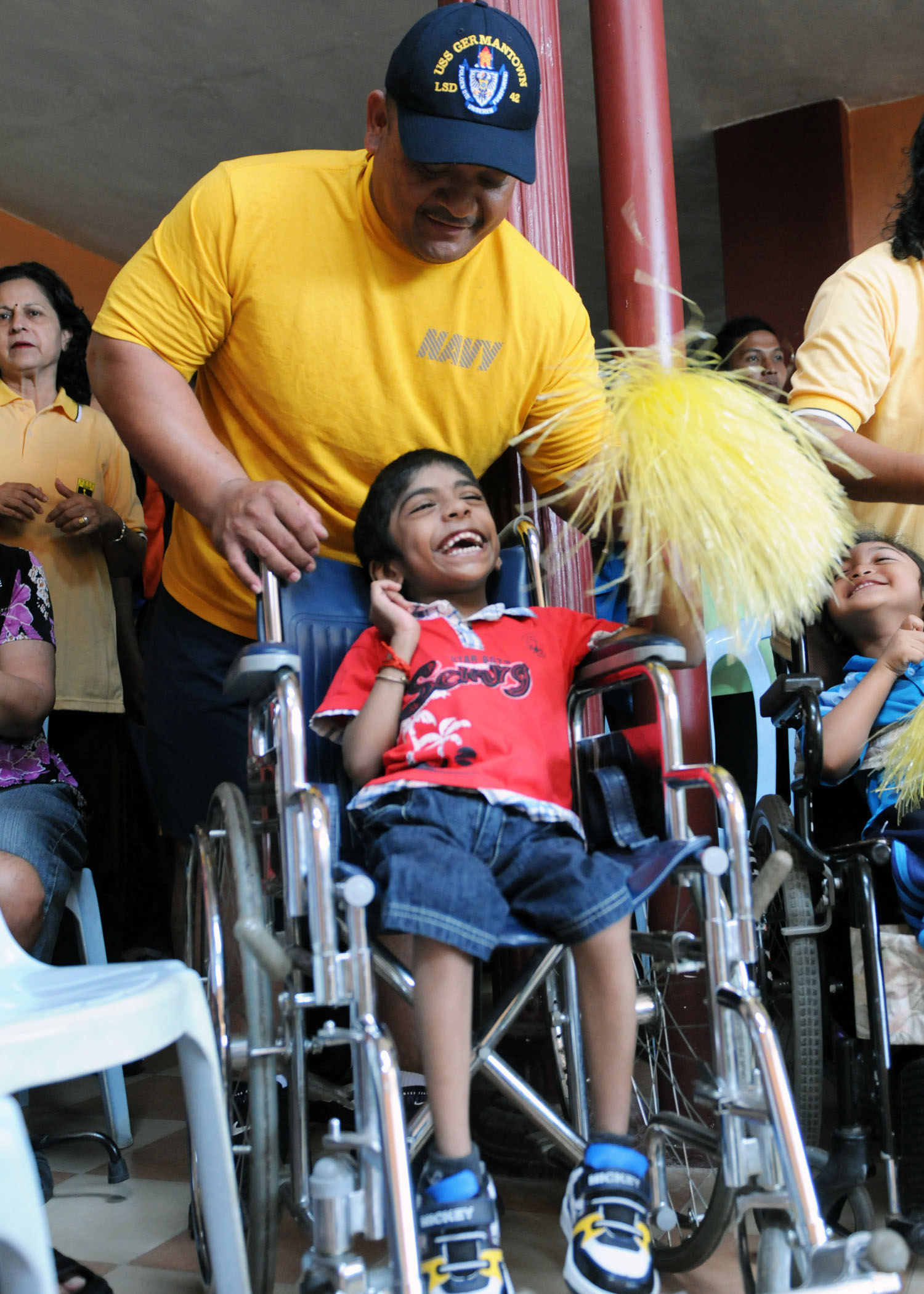
Disabled young boy smiling with his caretaker

Some children are placed in congregate care because they are believed to be in need of more behavioral or mental health support services, or because they have a clinical disability. In 2013 out of all children in congregate in the United States, 36% had a mental health disorder, 45% had behavioral issues, 10% had a disability, and 28% did not have any clinical labels. Many children are placed in these settings because there is a lack of space available in family settings. According to officials in a 2015 report, depending on the state there are anywhere between 5 and 32 percent of children who are placed in such settings that are not in need of such high restrictiveness and services.

== See also ==
- Orphanage
- Group home
- Residential child care community
