= Honour Me =

- Directed by: Alex Tweddle
- Written by: Sameem Ali & Alex Tweddle
- Produced by: Alex Tweddle
- Starring: Sameem Ali
- Cinematography: James Buck
- Edited by: Nick McCahearty
- Music by: Moritz Schmittat
- Distributed by: The UK Film Council & Screen East (Worldwide)
- Release date: October 2020
- Running time: 15 minutes
- Country: United Kingdom
- Language: English

Honour Me is a 2020 British documentary film produced and directed by Alex Tweddle.

Abandoned by her parents, Sameem Ali spent six and a half years growing up in a children's home. When she was told that her family wanted to take her back she could not wait to start her new life with them. Instead, she returned to a dirty house where she was subjected to endless chores. Her mother began to beat her and her unhappiness drove her to self-harm. So Sameem was excited when she boarded a plane with her mother to visit Pakistan for the first time. It was only after they arrived in her family's village that she realised she was not there on holiday. Aged just thirteen, Sameem was forced to marry a complete stranger.

When pregnant, two months later, she was made to return to the UK where she suffered further abuse from her family. After finding true love, Sameem fled the violence at home and escaped to Manchester with her young son. She believed she had put her horrific experiences behind her, but was unprepared for the consequences of violating her family's honour.

Honour Me is the true story of Sameem's struggle to break free from her past and fight back against her upbringing.
