= Foster care =

System of non-parental temporary child care

Children of the United Kingdom's Child Migration Programme – many of whom were placed in foster care in Australia

Foster care is a system in which a minor has been placed into a ward, group home (residential child care community or treatment centre), or private home of a state-certified caregiver, referred to as a "foster parent", or with a family member approved by the state. The placement of a "foster child" is normally arranged through the government or a social service agency. The institution, group home, or foster parent is compensated for expenses; kin caregivers may also be approved for fostering and receive the same compensation. Any adult who has spent time in care can be described as a "care leaver", especially in European countries.

The state, via the family court and child protective services agency, stand in loco parentis to the minor, making all legal decisions while the foster parent is responsible for the day-to-day care of the minor.

Scholars and activists have expressed concerns about the efficacy of foster care services provided by non-government organisations. Specifically, this pertains to poor retention rates of caseworkers. Neither a social work degree nor license is typically required, which means that few caseworkers are social workers any longer. Poor retention rates are attributed to being overworked in an emotionally draining field that offers minimal monetary compensation. The lack of professionals pursuing a degree in social work coupled with poor retention rates in the field has led to a shortage of caseworkers and created large caseloads for those who choose to work and stay in the field. The efficacy of caseworker retention also affects the overall ability to care for clients. Low staffing leads to data limitations that infringe on caseworkers' ability to adequately serve clients and their families.

Foster care is correlated with a range of negative outcomes compared to the general population. Early life experiences can have lasting developmental, cognitive, and emotional health, as can exposure to Adverse Childhood Experiences (ACES.). Children in foster care have a high rate of ill health, particularly psychiatric conditions such as anxiety, depression, and eating disorders. One third of foster children in a 2005 US study reported maltreatment by a foster parent or other adult in the foster home. A 2013 study, Homelessness During the Transition From Foster Care to Adulthood found that 36% of participants in this longitudinal study of former foster youth in three states had experienced homelessness at least once by age 26. Researchers theorized the rate may be higher given some young people weren't able to be located.

== By country ==
=== Australia ===
In Australia foster care was known as "boarding-out". Foster care had its early stages in South Australia in 1867 and stretched to the second half of the 19th century. It is said that the system was mostly run by women until the early 20th century. Afterwards, the control was centered in many state children's departments. "Although boarding-out was also implemented by non-government[al] child rescue organizations, many large institutions remained. These institutions assumed an increasing importance from the late 1920s when the system went into decline." The system was re-energized in the postwar era, as well as the 1970s. The system is still the main structure for "out-of-home care". It took care of both local and foreign children. "The first adoption legislation was passed in Western Australia in 1896, but the remaining states did not act until the 1920s, introducing the beginnings of the closed adoption that reached it peak in the period 1940–1975. New baby adoption dropped dramatically from the mid-1970s, with the greater tolerance of and support for single mothers".

=== Cambodia ===
Foster care in Cambodia is relatively new as an official practice within the government. However, despite a later start, the practice is currently making great strides within the country. Left with a large number of official and unofficial orphanages from the 1990s, the Cambodian government conducted several research projects in 2006 and 2008, pointing to the overuse of orphanages as a solution for caring for vulnerable children within the country. Most notably, the studies found that the percentage of children within orphanages that had parents approached 80%. At the same time, local NGOs like "Children In Families" began offering limited foster care services within the country. In the subsequent years, the Cambodian government began implementing policies that required the closure of some orphanages and the implementation of minimum standards for residential care institutions. These actions lead to an increase in the number of NGOs providing foster care placements and helped to set the course for care reform around the country. As of 2015, the Cambodian government is working with UNICEF, USAID, several governments, and many local NGOs in continuing to build the capacity for child protection and foster care within the Kingdom.

=== Canada ===
Foster children in Canada are known as permanent wards (crown wards in Ontario). A ward is someone, in this case a child, placed under protection of a legal guardian and are the legal responsibility of the government. Census data from 2011 counted children in foster care for the first time, counting 47,885 children in care. The majority of foster children – 29,590, or about 62 per cent – were aged 14 and under. The wards remain under the care of the government until they "age out of care". All ties are severed from the government and there is no longer any legal responsibility toward the youth. This age is different depending on the province.

=== Israel ===
In December 2013, the Israeli Knesset approved a bill co-drafted by the Israel National Council for the Child to regulate the rights and obligations of participants in the foster care system in Israel.

=== Japan ===
The idea of foster care or taking in abandoned children actually came about around 1392–1490s in Japan. The foster care system in Japan is similar to the Orphan Trains system of the US, thinking the children would do better on farms rather than living in the "dusty city". The families would often send their children to a farm family outside the village and only keep their oldest son. The farm families served as the foster parents and they were financially rewarded for taking in the younger siblings. "It was considered an honor to be chosen as foster parents, and selection greatly depended on the family's reputation and status within the village". Around 1895 the foster care program became more like the system used in the United States because the Tokyo Metropolitan Police sent children to a hospital where they would be "settled". Problems emerged in this system, such as child abuse, so the government started phasing it out and "began increasing institutional facilities". In 1948 the Child Welfare Law was passed, increasing official oversight, and creating better conditions for the children to grow up in.

=== United Kingdom ===
In the United Kingdom, foster care and adoption has always been an option, "in the sense of taking other people's children into their homes and looking after them on a permanent or temporary basis." However, nothing about it had a legal foundation until the 20th century. The UK had "wardship", the family taking in the child had custody by the Chancery Court. Wardship was not used very often because it did not give the guardian "parental rights". In the 19th century came a "series of baby farming scandals". At the end of the 19th century they started calling it "boarding-out" like they did in Australia. They started placing the children in orphanages and workhouses as well. "The First World War saw an increase in organized adoption through adoption societies and child rescue organizations, and pressure grew for adoption to be given legal status." The first laws based on adoption and foster care were passed in 1926. "The peak number of adoptions was in 1968, since then there has been an enormous decline in adoption in the United Kingdom. The main reasons for children being adopted in the United Kingdom had been unmarried mothers giving up their children for adoption and stepparents adopting their new partner's children".

=== United States ===
Historians of foster care in America emphasize biases of race and class status that shaped divergent experiences for children. In particular, the United States welfare system has reckoned with a longer history of Black children taken away from their families during slavery. Scholars have also documented the negative conditions faced by often impoverished children during the creation of early orphanages. Prior to protections of Tribes and the right of Indigenous children to remain within their tribal communities such as the 1978 Indian Child Welfare Act, child welfare concerns were cited as reasoning to remove 35% of Indigenous children from their families and tribes.

In the United States, Charles Loring Brace, who founded the Children's Aid Society, is considered the forerunner of modern foster family care. Taking note that nearly 30,000 homeless or neglected children lived in New York City alone, Brace took these children off the streets and placed them with families around the United States, particularly Christian families living on farms, in an attempt to improve their quality of life. Between 1853 and his death in 1890, Brace transported over 120,000 children by train, giving name to the Orphan Train Movement. When Brace died in 1890, his sons took over his work of the Children's Aid Society until they retired.

From August 1999 to August 2019, over 9 million American children were removed from their families and placed in foster homes. As of August 2026, according to AFCARS data, there were 331,747 children in foster care nationally, a decrease since August 2022, when 407,332 children were in care. On average, an American child in foster care spends two birthdays in the system.

According to the Administration for Children and Family's data, the factors contributing to foster care placement are significantly different for younger children than older children. "Child's Circumstances," which includes child's substance use disorder, behavior, diagnosed condition, and runaway accounts for the placement of 29% of youth ages 11 to 16 and 43% of 17 year olds entering foster care. For children 1 - 5, "Child's Circumstances," are attributed to only 2% of placements while "Family Circumstances" contributed to the placement of 90%. "Family Circumstances" includes parental substance use disorder, cognitive impairment, physical or emotional impairment, and death. This means two very different populations are served; one for very young children whose caregivers are challenged to provide safe care, and the other an older group with their own special needs related to behavioral health needs.

To create a safe environment for the child long term, children in American foster care have both a case plan and a case plan goal. A case plan is a clear statement about why the child needs protection and the roles and responsibilities of all participants (case worker, foster parents, etc.) in addressing the child's safety, permanence and well-being. The case plan goal is the end goal for the child that ends their stay in foster care. 52% of foster children in America have the goal of reunification with their parent(s) or primary caretaker(s).

=== France ===
In France, foster families are called familles d'accueil (literally "welcome families"). Foster homes must obtain an official approval from the government in order to welcome a minor or an elderly person. In order to receive this approval they must follow a training and their home is inspected to be sure it is safe and healthy. In 2017, 344,000 minors and 15,000 elderly persons were welcomed in foster homes.

The Foundling Hospital in Paris is often considered the first state efforts to assist children, founded in 1670 by Saint Vincent de Paul. Mothers had the option of anonymously depositing their infant children at the gate, a practice that was unique across much of Europe. Simple adoption, a form of additional parentage, was first codified into French law through the Civil Code of 1804 and allowed only adults over fifty without any legitimate children to adopt. The specificity of a lack of legitimate children hoped to reduce interference with inheritance.

Traditionally, there is an emphasis on keeping families in contact as much as possible as parents often keep parental responsibility. The majority of social services for these children relies on both local authorities and Judicial Juvenile Protection, which includes laws outlining protections allowed to the children. Current laws limit families to three children in foster care, but exceptions may be made by the president of the Departmental Council in certain cases.

=== Italy ===
Although the numbers have greatly decreased since post World War II, over 27,000 children in Italy are in alternative care. Under 40% of children are able to return to their birth families, which is the ultimate goal of foster care.

Italian law considers familial relationships to be pivotal to a child's developments and gives primary relevance to the original family and offer home based support. However, if neglect or abuse is present, the judicial system may intervene to remove involved children. In 2001, all institution based facilities for displaced children were closed and replaced with residential homes in order to provide a more familial feeling.

== Placement ==
Family-based foster care is generally preferred to other forms of out of home care. Foster care is intended to be a short-term solution until a permanent placement can be made. In most states, the primary objective is to reconcile children with the biological parents. However, if the parents are unable or unwilling to care for the child, or if the child is an orphan, then the first choice of adoptive parents is a relative such as an aunt, uncle or grandparent, known as kinship care. Most kinship care is done informally, without the involvement of a court or public organization. However, in the United States, formal kinship care is increasingly common. In 2012, a quarter of all children in formal foster care were placed with relatives instead of being placed into the system.

If no related family member is willing or able to adopt, the next preference is for the child to be adopted by the foster parents or by someone else involved in the child's life (such as a teacher or coach). This is to maintain continuity in the child's life. If neither above option are available, the child may be adopted by someone who is a stranger to the child.

If none of these options are viable, the plan for the minor may be to enter OPPLA (Other Planned Permanent Living Arrangement). This option allows the child to stay in custody of the state and the child can stay placed in a foster home, with a relative or a long-term care facility, such as a residential child care community or, for children with development disabilities, physical disabilities or mental disabilities, a treatment center.

671,000 children were served by the foster care system in the United States in 2015. "After declining more than 20 percent between FY 2006 and FY 2012 to a low of 397,000, the number of children in foster care on the last day of the fiscal year increased to 428,000 in FY 2015, with a slightly higher percent change from 2014 to 2015 (3.3%) than observed from 2013 to 2014 (3.2%)." Since FY 2012, the number of children in foster care at the end of each FY has steadily increased.

The median amount of time a child spent in foster care in the U.S. in 2015 was 13.5 months. That year, 74% of children spent less than two years in foster care, while 13% were in care for three or more years. Of the estimated 427,910 children in foster care on September 30, 2015: 43 percent were White, 24 percent were African-American, 21 percent were Hispanic (of any race), 10 percent were other races or multiracial, and 2 percent were unknown or unable to be determined.

Children may enter foster care voluntarily or involuntarily. Voluntary placement may occur when a biological parent or lawful guardian is unable to care for a child. Involuntary placement occurs when a child is removed from their biological parent or lawful guardian due to the risk or actual occurrence of physical or psychological harm, or if the child has been orphaned. In the US, most children enter foster care due to neglect. If a biological parent or legal guardian is unwilling or unable to care for a child, the child is deemed to be dependent by the Juvenile Court and is placed under the legal care of the child protection agency. The policies regarding foster care as well as the criteria to be met to become a foster parent vary according to legal jurisdiction.

Especially egregious failures of child protective services often serve as a catalyst for increased removal of children from the homes of biological parents. An example is the brutal torture and murder of 17-month-old Peter Connelly, a British toddler who died in London Borough of Haringey, North London after suffering more than 50 severe injuries over an eight-month period, including eight broken ribs and a broken back. Throughout the period of time in which he was being tortured, he was repeatedly seen by Haringey Children's services and NHS health professionals. Haringey Children's services already failed ten years earlier in the case of Victoria Climbié. In the time since his death, in 2007, cases have reached a record rate in England surpassing 10,000 in the reporting year ending in March 2012.

== Abuse and negligence ==
Although the majority of children in the foster care system are not abused or neglected, children in foster care do experience higher rates of child abuse, emotional deprivation, and physical neglect than those not in care. In one study in the United Kingdom, "foster children were 7–8 times, and children in residential care 6 times more likely to be assessed by a pediatrician for abuse than a child in the general population". A study of foster children in Oregon and Washington State in the US found that nearly one-third reported being abused by a foster parent or another adult in a foster home.

Although caregivers are put through a thorough and intense screening before being allowed to take in any children, the foster care system often lacks any safeguards to reevaluate families once they have taken in children. The death of a child in foster care may not be investigated as thoroughly in order to not further displace other children in the same foster home. Organizations such as Child Abuse Prevention Services, located in Long Island, New York, suggest regular home visits and monitoring to ensure early intervention in the case of any avoidable issues or clearly unsafe conditions.

In a 2023 study, 66% of the 143 youth currently in foster care who had reached out for help to the "National Sexual Assault Online Hotline" were victims of sexual abuse by a foster family member. These youth may encounter different barriers than their peers not in foster care such as concerns for safety, a lack of trust in the foster care system, previous negative reception to disclosure of sexual abuse, or not wanting to move placements.

The race, sex, age, and sibling status all significantly influence potential instability of a placement. Non-white children, males, older children, and those who are only children were the most at risk of an unsafe or unstable foster care placement. In general, older children in foster care are more likely to experience behavioral and mental health issues, which have been correlated with less likely success of adoption and fostering.

== Flaws in the Foster Care System ==
According to the American Journal of Public Health the maltreatment of foster families and foster placements is affected by ethnic and racial background. Children of color are more likely to go missing and are more frequently maltreated in the foster care system. A reported 20% of black children are constantly being harmed in the foster care system. The majority of children in foster care are consistently being relocated and on average go through three or more homes in two years. Within the first 18 months in the foster care system, 18.9% of children live in two different homes and 8.5% live in three or more different homes. Placement instability leads to long term attachment issues for children in foster care and often for the families caring for the children. This can result in the children in foster care having additional mental, physical, and behavioral needs. If these needs are not met, these children may experience PTSD and behavioral issues, which would impact all aspects of their lives. This is where we see former foster youth experiencing incarceration, failure in school, damaged relationships, and more. This healing is reliant on healthy parenting and understanding as well as regulated nervous systems for the children.

== Development ==
As of 2019, in the US, the majority of children in the foster care system were under eight years of age. These early years are quite important for the physical and mental development of children. More specifically, these early years are most important for brain development. Stressful and traumatic experiences have been found to have long-term negative consequences for the brain development in children whereas talking, singing, and playing can help encourage brain growth. Since the majority of children are removed from their homes due to neglect, this means that many of these children did not experience stable and stimulating environments to help promote this necessary growth.

In a research study conducted at the University of Minnesota, researchers found that children placed in non-parental homes, such as foster homes, showed significant behavior problems and higher levels of internalizing problems in comparison to children in traditional families, even those who were mistreated by caregivers. A child who has lived in an orphanage or a home for multiple children may have learned survival skills but lack family skills due to a lack of permanency.

== Medical and psychiatric disorders ==
A higher prevalence of physical, psychological, cognitive and epigenetic disorders for children in foster care has been established in studies in various countries. The Casey Family Programs Northwest Foster Care Alumni Study was a fairly extensive study of various aspects of children who had been in foster care. Individuals who were in foster care experience higher rates of physical and psychiatric morbidity than the general population and suffer from not being able to trust and that can lead to placements breaking down.

In the Casey study of foster children in Oregon and Washington state, they were found to have double the incidence of depression, 20% as compared to 10% and were found to have a higher rate of post-traumatic stress disorder (PTSD) than combat veterans with 25% of those studied having PTSD. Children in foster care have a higher probability of having attention deficit hyperactivity disorder (ADHD), and deficits in executive functioning, anxiety as well as other developmental problems.

These children experience higher degrees of incarceration, poverty, homelessness, and suicide. Studies in the U.S. have suggested that some foster care placements may be more detrimental to children than remaining in a troubled home, but a more recent study suggested that these findings may have been affected by selection bias, and that foster care has little effect on behavioral problems.

=== Neurodevelopment ===
Foster children have elevated levels of cortisol, a stress hormone, in comparison to children raised by their biological parents. Elevated cortisol levels can compromise the immune system. (Harden BJ, 2004). Most of the processes involved in typical neurodevelopment are predicated upon the establishment of close nurturing relationships and environmental stimulation. Negative environmental influences during this critical period of brain development can have lifelong consequences.

=== Post-traumatic stress disorder ===
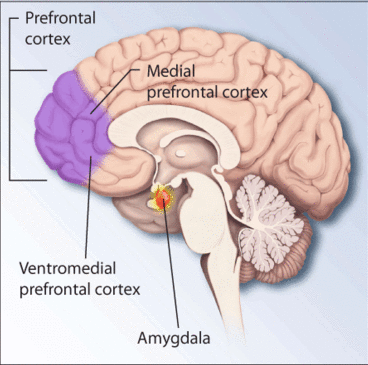
Regions of the brain associated with stress and post-traumatic stress disorder

Children in foster care have a higher incidence of post-traumatic stress disorder (PTSD). In one study, 60% of children in foster care who had experienced sexual abuse had PTSD, and 42% of those who had been physically abused met the PTSD criteria. PTSD was also found in 18% of the children who were not abused. These children may have developed PTSD due to witnessing violence in the home. (Marsenich, 2002).

In order to figure out if a child has developed PTSD, there is a PTSD module, the 'anxiety disorder interview'. This is considered a reliable resource for establishing if a child has developed post traumatic stress disorder due to physical, sexual, or mental abuse.

In a study conducted in Oregon and Washington state, the rate of PTSD in adults who were in foster care for one year between the ages of 14 and 18 was found to be higher than that of combat veterans, with 25% of those in the study meeting the diagnostic criteria as compared to 12–13% of Iraq war veterans and 15% of Vietnam war veterans, and a rate of 4% in the general population. The recovery rate for foster home alumni was 28.2% as opposed to 47% in the general population. Understanding the impact of the child's early experience, and the maltreatment that brought the child to child welfare's attention is critical to identifying causation.

"More than half the study participants reported clinical levels of mental illness, compared to less than a quarter of the general population".

=== Eating disorders ===
Foster children are at increased risk for a variety of eating disorders in comparison to the general population. In a study done in the United Kingdom, 35% of foster children experienced an increase in Body Mass Index (BMI) once in care. Food Maintenance Syndrome is characterized by a set of aberrant eating behaviors of children in foster care. It is "a pattern of excessive eating and food acquisition and maintenance behaviors without concurrent obesity"; it resembles "the behavioral correlates of Hyperphagic Short Stature". It is hypothesized that this syndrome is triggered by the stress and maltreatment foster children are subjected to, it was prevalent amongst 25 percent of the study group in New Zealand. Bulimia nervosa is seven times more prevalent among former foster children than in the general population.

=== Poverty and homelessness ===
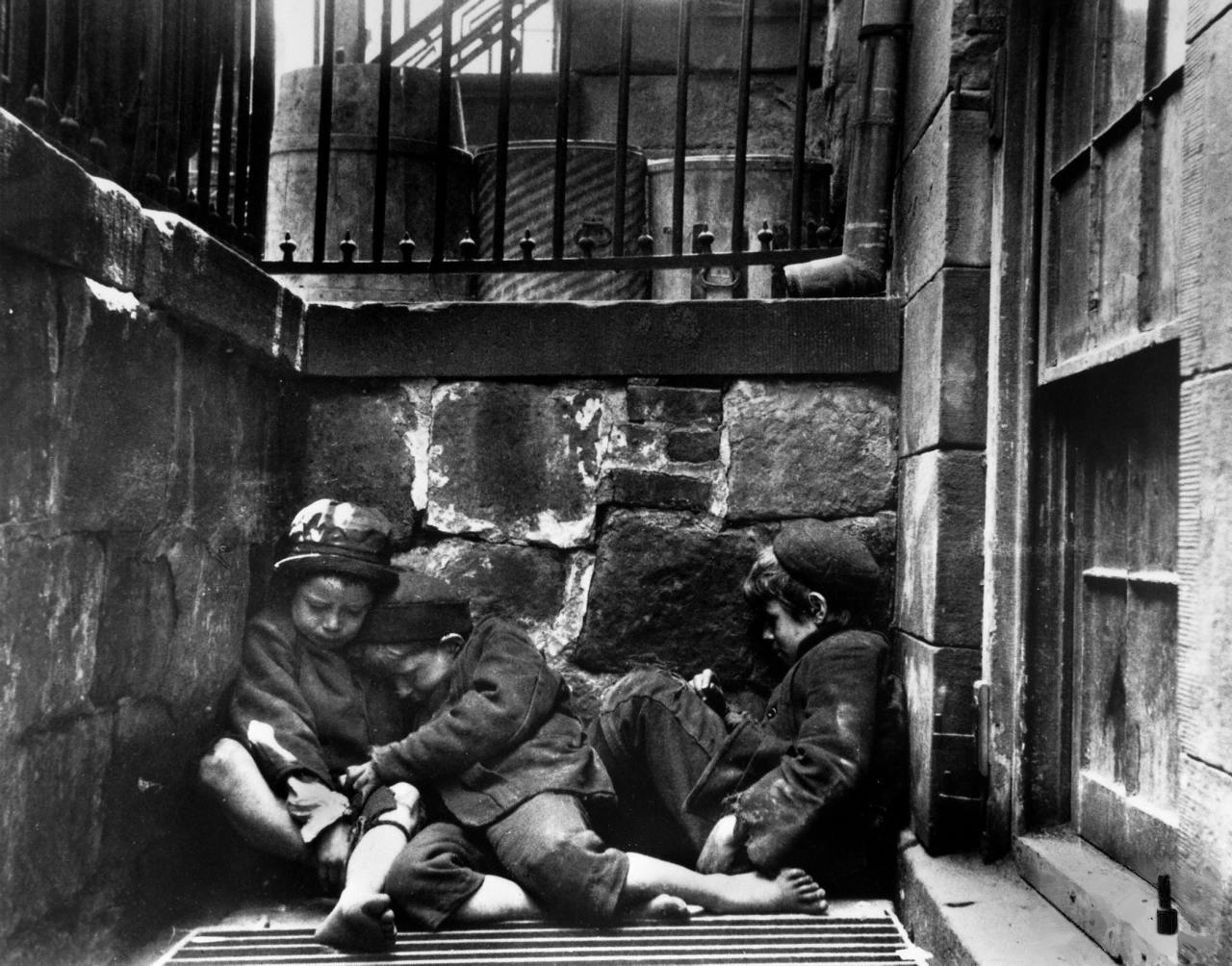
New York street children in 1890

Nearly half of foster children in the U.S. become homeless when they turn 18. One of every 10 foster children stays in foster care longer than seven years, and each year about 15,000 reach the age of majority and leave foster care without a permanent family—many to join the ranks of the homeless or to commit crimes and be imprisoned.

Three out of 10 of the United States homeless are former foster children. According to the results of the Casey Family Study of Foster Care Alumni, up to 80 percent are doing poorly—with a quarter to a third of former foster children at or below the poverty line, three times the national poverty rate. Very frequently, people who are homeless had multiple placements as children: some were in foster care, but others experienced "unofficial" placements in the homes of family or friends.

Individuals with a history of foster care tend to become homeless at an earlier age than those who were not in foster care. The length of time a person remains homeless is longer in individuals who were in foster care.

=== Suicide-death rate ===
Children in foster care are at a greater risk of suicide. The increased risk of suicide is still prevalent after leaving foster care. In a small study of twenty-two Texan youths who aged out of the system, 23 percent had a history of suicide attempts.

A Swedish study utilizing the data of almost one million people including 22,305 former foster children who had been in care prior to their teens, concluded:

Former child welfare clients were in year of birth and sex standardised risk ratios (RRs) four to five times more likely than peers in the general population to have been hospitalised for suicide attempts....Individuals who had been in long-term foster care tended to have the most dismal outcome...former child welfare/protection clients should be considered a high-risk group for suicide attempts and severe psychiatric morbidity.

=== Death rate ===
Children in foster care have an overall higher mortality rate than children in the general population. A study conducted in Finland among current and former foster children up to age 24 found a higher mortality rate due to substance abuse, accidents, suicide and illness. The deaths due to illness were attributed to an increased incidence of acute and chronic medical conditions and developmental delays among children in foster care.

Georgia Senator Nancy Schaefer published a report "The Corrupt Business of Child Protective Services" stating:

The National Center on Child Abuse and Neglect in 1998 reported that six times as many children died in foster care than in the general public and that once removed to official "safety", these children are far more likely to suffer abuse, including sexual molestation than in the general population.

=== Academic prospects ===
Educational outcomes of ex-foster children in the Northwest Alumni Study:

- 56% completed high school compared to 82% of the general population, although an additional 29% of former foster children received a G.E.D. compared to an additional 5% of the general population.
- 42.7% completed some education beyond high school.
- 20.6% completed any degree or certificate beyond high school
- 16.1% completed a vocational degree; 21.9% for those over 25.
- 1.8% complete a bachelor's degree, 2.7% for over 25, the completion rate for the general population in the same age group is 24%, a sizable difference.

The study reviewed case records for 659 foster care alumni in Northwest USA, and interviewed 479 of them between September 2000 and January 2002.

=== Higher Education ===
Approximately 10% of foster youth make it to college and of those 10%, only about 3% actually graduate and obtain a 4-year degree. Although the number of foster youth who are starting at a 4-year university after high school has increased over the years, the number of youth who graduate from college continues to remain stable. A study of 712 youth in California, the results revealed that foster care youth are five times less likely to attend college than youth who do not go through foster care. There are different resources that offer both financial and emotional support for foster youth to continue their education. Simultaneously, there are also many barriers that make getting to a college or university difficult.

Borton describes some of the barriers youth face in her article, Barriers to Post-Secondary Enrollment for Former Foster Youth. A few of those barriers include financial hurdles, navigating through the application process with little to no support, and lack of housing.

Many studies have shown that there are a few factors that have seemingly played a role in the success of foster youth making it to and graduating from a college or university. While having financial resources for foster youth is a huge help, there are other components to look at. Beginning with having support for these youth at the high school level. In order for foster youth to obtain a college degree, they must enroll at a university first.

Out of the different factors that play in increasing college enrollment such as youth participating in extended foster care, reading ability, etc., youth who received assistance or had supportive relationships from adults, were more likely than youth who did not have supportive relationships, to enroll at a university.

At colleges across the nation, there are programs that are specifically put in place to help youth who have aged out of the foster care system and continued into higher education. These programs often help youth financially by giving them supplemental funds and providing support through peer mentor programs or academic counseling services. While funding is an important key in helping get through college, it has not been found as the only crucial component in aiding a youth's success.

A study done by Jay and colleagues provides insight on what youth view as important in helping them thrive on a college campus. The study, which had a sample of 51 foster youth, used Conceptual Mapping to break down the different components of support that may be important for youth to receive on a college campus.

=== Psychotropic medication use ===
Studies have revealed that youth in foster care covered by Medicaid insurance receive psychotropic medication at a rate that was 3 times higher than that of Medicaid-insured youth who qualify by low family income. In a review (September 2003 to August 2004) of the medical records of 32,135 Texas foster care 0–19 years old, 12,189 were prescribed psychotropic medication, resulting in an annual prevalence of 37.9% of these children being prescribed medication. 41.3% received 3 different classes of these drugs during July 2004, and 15.9% received 4 different classes. The most frequently used medications were antidepressants (56.8%), attention-deficit/hyperactivity disorder drugs (55.9%), and antipsychotic agents (53.2%). The study also showed that youth in foster care are frequently treated with concomitant psychotropic medication, for which sufficient evidence regarding safety and effectiveness is not available.

The use of expensive, brand name, patent protected medication was prevalent. In the case of SSRIs the use of the most expensive medications was noted to be 74%; in the general market only 28% are for brand name SSRI's vs generics. The average out-of-pocket expense per prescription was $34.75 for generics and $90.17 for branded products, a $55.42, difference.

== Therapeutic intervention ==
Children in the child welfare system have often experienced significant and repeated traumas and having a background in foster homes—especially in instances of sexual abuse—can be the precipitating factor in a wide variety of psychological and cognitive deficits it may also serve to obfuscate the true cause of underlying issues. The foster care experience may have nothing to do with the symptoms, or on the other hand, a disorder may be exacerbated by having a history of foster care and attendant abuses. The human brain however has been shown to have a fair degree of neuroplasticity. and adult neurogenesis has been shown to be an ongoing process.

Multidimensional Treatment Foster Care (MTFC), also referred to as Treatment Foster Care Oregon (TFCO) and Treatment Foster Care (TFC) is a community-based intervention that was created in 1983 by Dr. Patricia Chamberlain and her associated colleagues with the initial design intended to offer a replacement for group facilities. MTFC has differing approaches for different age groups. Preschoolers receive "a behavior-management approach and intensively trains, supervises, and supports foster caregivers to provide positive adult support and consistent limit setting" coupled with "coordinated interventions with the child's biological parents." MTFC for adolescence consists of individual placement with an intensely trained foster family providing "coordinated interventions in the home, with peers, [and] in educational settings." MTFC has been shown to provide better results than group facilities and proves to be more cost effective. Reports show that Multidimensional treatment has effective results in reducing depression, arrest rates, deviant peer affiliations, placement disruption, and pregnancy rates while having positive replication trials. It is one method that attempts to incorporate trauma informed care into its design. However, it is important to mention that MTFC is a voluntary program, and both the youth and their parent(s) must agree to participate. Delinquent youth may face less desirable settings, unlike those in the foster care system, that increases their motivation to participate.

Researchers have faced difficulty when it comes to accurately assessing what makes MTFC and other similar programs that involve multiple levels of intervention successful. It seems to remain in a "black box" scenario where it is unsure what aspect of the treatment plan is actually producing positive effects. Multiple peer-reviewed research articles on foster care programs point out a lack of research effectively evaluating the outcomes of specific foster care programs, calling for more complete assessments to be conducted in order to properly compare outcomes between treatment plans and evaluate what practices in MTFC are most effective. Ethical concerns have also been raised by Therese Åström and other associated researchers when conducting a systematic review on behalf of the Swedish Agency for Health Technology Assessment and Assessment of Social Services in 2018, noting that on the one hand MTFC is evaluated as effective, however, it tends to be implemented in a way that diminishes the child's agency.

The L.Y.G.H.T. program is a peer grief support program that has been shown to increase perceived social support and hope while decreasing perceived problems.

=== Cross-cultural adoption policies ===
George Shanti, Nico Van Oudenhoven, and Rekha Wazir, co-authors of Foster Care Beyond the Crossroads: Lessons from an International Comparative Analysis, say that there are four types of Government foster care systems. The first one is that of developing countries. These countries do not have policies implemented to take care of the basic needs of these children and these children mostly receive assistance from relatives. The second system is that of former socialist governments. The historical context of these states has not allowed for the evolution of their foster care system. NGO's have urged them to evolve; however the traditional system of institutionalizing these children is still in place. Thirdly, liberal democracies do not have the support from its political system in order to take care of these children, even though they have the resources. Finally, social democracies are the most advanced governments in regards to their foster care system. These governments have a massive infrastructure, funding, and support system in order to help foster care children.

== Adoption ==
Foster care adoption is a type of domestic adoption where the child is initially placed into a foster care system and is subsequently placed for adoption.

Children may be placed into foster care for a variety of reasons; including, removal from the home by a governmental agency because of maltreatment. Removals must be sanctioned by a legal authority from the Juvenile Court, and regular reviews conducted. In some jurisdictions, adoptive parents are licensed as and technically considered foster parents while the adoption is being finalized. According to the U.S. Department of Health and Human Services Children's Bureau, there were approximately 408,425 children in foster care in 2010. Of those children, twenty-five percent had a goal of adoption. In 2015, 243,060 children exited foster care and twenty-two percent were adopted. Nationwide, there are more than one hundred thousand children in the U.S. foster care system waiting for permanent families.

Adoptive parenting can have an impact on children, recent research has shown that warm adoptive parenting reduces internalizing and externalizing problems of the adoptive children over time.

== Outcomes ==
Youth who are aging out of foster care often face difficulties in transitioning into adulthood, especially in terms of finding stable housing, employment, finances, and educational opportunities. The suspected reason for these difficulties involves a lack of stability experienced while in the foster care system, and the reported abuse and/or neglect in their childhood, which may affect their ability to cope with significant life changes. In the United States, there are independent living programs designed with the intent to serve the needs of transitioning foster youth. However, youth aging out of foster care have indicated that these programs are failing to fully address the needs of young adults without familial assistance. Nearly half reported that they were unprepared for independent living and cited a lack of concrete needs such as safe housing, money and bus passes after aging out.

In a study conducted by Gypen et al. (2017), involving a cross-database analysis of research articles relevant to the outcomes of former foster youth, they found that the educational, mental health, employment, income, stable housing, criminal involvement and substance abuse issues outcomes for youth who have aged out of the foster care system are substantially poorer than their peers. For example, Gypen et al. (2017), indicated that only 45% of former foster youth received a high school diploma, which is 23% lower than the general population. There are also significantly poorer outcomes for children who were formerly in foster care than children from low-income households and racial minorities. African American former foster youth graduate high school at a much lower rate then their white counterparts. The likelihood for secondary degree obtainment, whether a two or four year degree, is significantly decreased compared to the general population in every survey. A 2011 study found that between 8-13% of former foster youth obtained either a 2 or 4 year college degree compared to 34-44% of the general population. Children who are eventually adopted by their placement family show greater outcomes, in terms of finding stable housing, employment, finances and education opportunities, than those who aged out of the foster care system without a permanent placement.

Economically, former foster youth also fall behind their non-foster youth peers. Annually, former foster youth make about $7550 less than their peers. After aging out about 17%-33% are dependent on public assistance (such as food stamps). Of those who age out of the family services system and move in with a partner, 32% don't have any sort of income compared to 3% of the general population.

The mental health of those that age out of foster care also suffers more than the general population. Around 62% of former foster youth will be diagnosed with at least 1 psychiatric illness in their lifetime with a much higher rate of women getting such a diagnosis. Former foster youth also experience higher levels of substance abuse and alcohol dependency. Between 40% and 49% of former foster youth will abuse alcohol and 3% to 13% will become dependent on it. 39% of former foster youth smoke compared to 20% of youth in general and 16% use cannabis compared to 6.5%. Former foster youth who identify as male are 3 times more likely to abuse substances than females.

It has also been reported that former foster youth have a higher chance of ending up in prostitution, and even fall prey to sex trafficking. This has also been called the "foster care to prostitution pipeline". A 2012 study in Los Angeles found that 59% of juveniles arrested for prostitution were or had been in foster care, but the generalizability of these findings has been disputed.

== See also ==
- Assisted living
- Attachment theory
- Child abandonment
- Child and family services
- Child and youth care
- Community-based care
- Community integration
- Complex post-traumatic stress disorder
- Congregate Care
- Cottage Homes
- Independent living
- Orphan train
- Orphanage
- Reactive attachment disorder
- Residential education
- Substance dependence
- Supported living
- Supported housing
- Teaching-family model
- Family support
- Wraparound (childcare)
