= Children's home =

Type of residential care for children

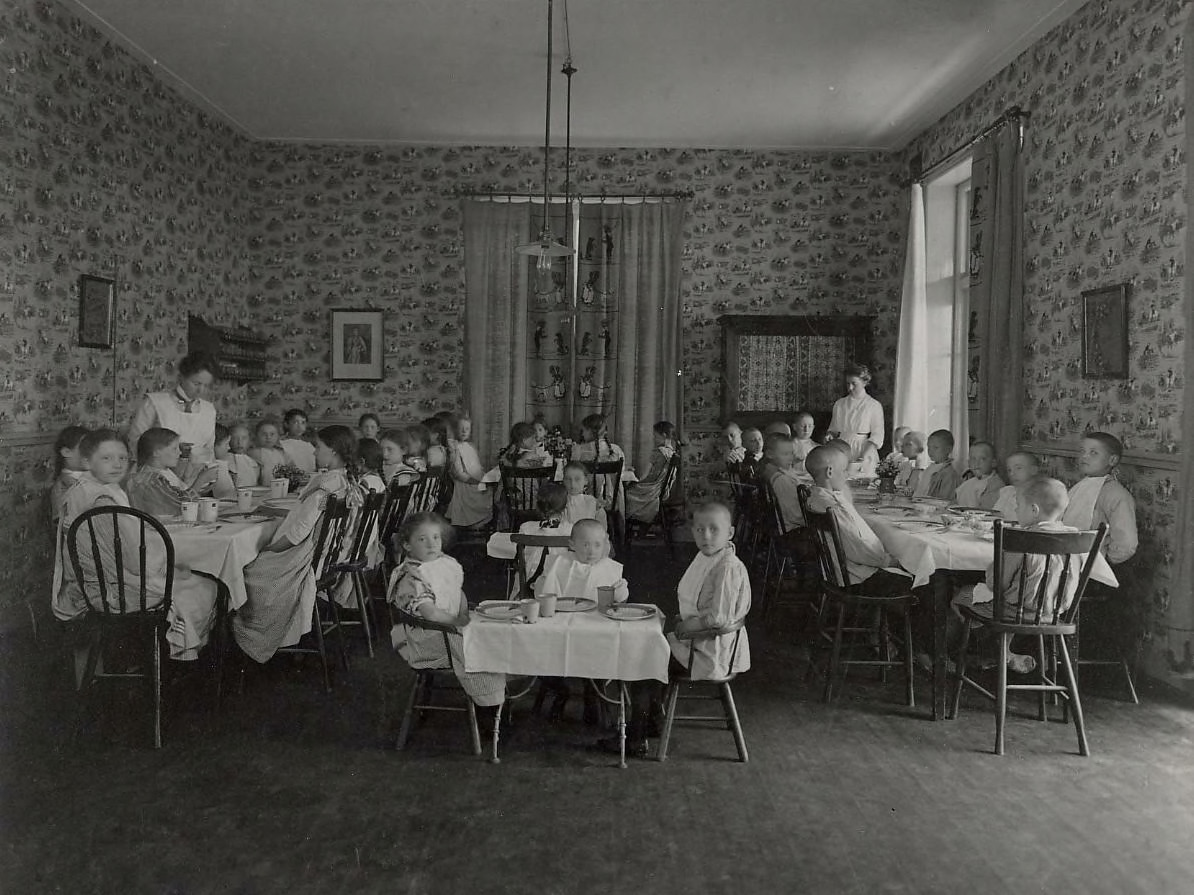
Children's home in Haarlem, the Netherlands (1913)

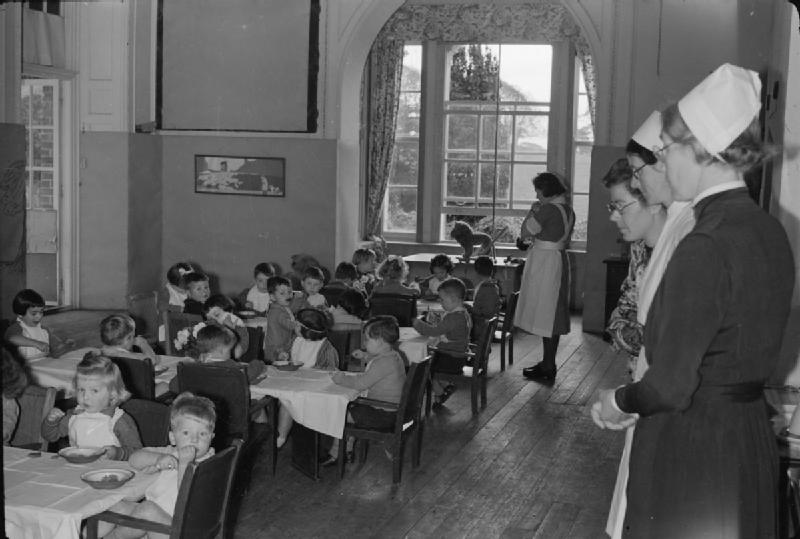
Children enjoy a meal in the dining room of the Tapley Park Children's Home supervised by a team of nurses (Instow, Devon, 1942).

Children's homes are a type of residential care facility, providing long-term care to children who cannot stay with a family or legal guardian.

Children's homes may operate on one or more than one campus. Staff, such as house parents, social workers, therapists, teachers, or management cooperate to provide for children. By sharing a campus, programs such as work, leisure, therapy and tutoring can be offered, which may not be affordable for foster parents. These communities are also well connected with their environment, their donors and other children's homes and keep in touch with and support their alumni.

A children's home might also be referred to as a group home or a form of congregate care. It is not a residential treatment center or an orphanage.

== Types of care ==
There are two types of children's home: The Family Model and the Shift Model. Both types of organizations can vary in size, number of children per unit, number of staff per unit, number of units and educational/therapeutic services.

The outcome goal depends on the child in care and can be unification with the child's family and therefore preparation of the child for life at home, preparation for living with a new family or long-term care.

=== Family model ===
Related literature refers to the Teaching Family Model which was originally implemented in 1967 and used in juvenile justice. Several organizations had been using an advanced version of this model before (see positive examples).

Organizations using this model employ married couples, also referred to as house parents or cottage parents, who are living in a dwelling on campus, together with a certain number of children. These couples must go through in depth and continued training each year. The goal is to model a positive family life and thereby teach children life, communication and interaction skills.

Several studies show the positive outcomes of this type of care. Significant improvements in academic achievements, behavior, psychiatric symptoms, relationship with the parents as well as a decrease in offense rates were found.

=== Shift model ===
Organizations using the shift model usually consist of four to five units with four to five staff members rotating care in shifts for six to eight children (these numbers can vary).

They may do so by utilizing different models, such as:

The Sanctuary Model (USA) – This model highlights trauma and the fact that change has to be implemented at a systems level. It focuses on SELF (safety, emotion management, loss, future).

Care (USA) – This model focuses on the development of a curriculum to improve the support provided by leadership as well as consistency among the way direct-care staff members deal with the children in care.

Social Pedagogy (Europe) – This model focuses on values, the diversity of cultures and a good relationship between direct-care staff and child by using the opportunities everyday tasks and events offer to encourage development.

ARC (USA) – This model provides a flexible framework for direct-care staff, allowing them to choose from several intervention methods addressing three key areas: attachment, self-regulation and competency.

MAP (NI, Canada) – This model helps direct-care staff understand children's behaviour by consideration of attachment theory and neurodevelopment. Staff should act, not observe, recognize the importance of authoritative parenting as well as the emotional demands they have to deal with themselves by doing this job.

== By jurisdiction ==
=== Australia ===
Due to costs and poor perception, Australia closed all its residential child care facilities in the 1980s and 1990s. Many of the children previously cared for ended up in the homeless program SAAP (Supported Accommodation Assistance Program), as well as in juvenile justice.

In 2004, the Crime and Misconduct Commission published a report with the title "Protecting Children: An Inquiry into Abuse of Children in Foster Care". Due to this report, the government re-established residential child care facilities, with a focus on quality standards. Queensland has found that closing residential child care programs is not the best idea, as there is a need for such organizations.

=== United Kingdom ===
Josh MacAlister, Minister for Children and Families, noted in July 2026 that England had 9,480 looked after children living in residential children's homes, equivalent to 12% of all children in care. This number, he said, was too many.

=== United States ===
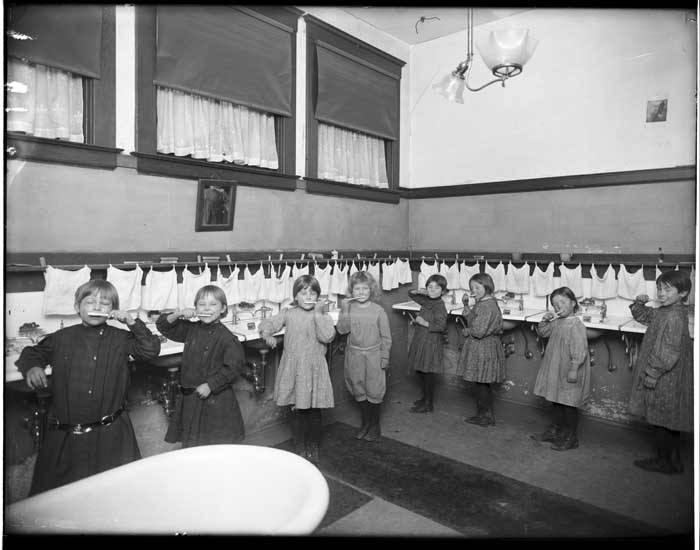
A group of children at the Seattle Children's Home are brushing their teeth in a large bathroom. Their drying washcloths hang over the sinks (ca. 1911).

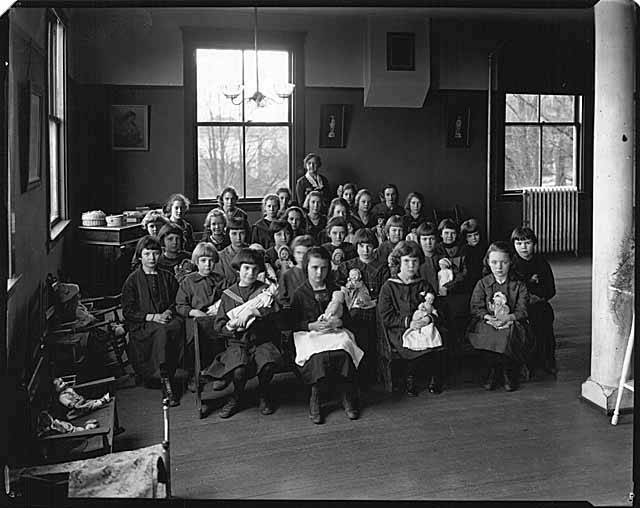
Washington Children's Home residents with dolls (Seattle ca. 1921)

In the United States, poorhouses, orphanages, and state school institutions housed children throughout much of the eighteenth and nineteenth centuries in the United States. These institutions were established due to increasing poverty by Dutch and British churches around 1500, and taken to North America when emigration began. The Dutch opened their first almshouses on American soil in the 1650s, in what is known today as New York City and Albany.

By the early 1900s, about 150,000 American children were accommodated by 1,150 child care institutions, which fulfilled their purpose at that time, but were not always the best and safest environments for a child to grow up in. Still it has to be considered that a child's life back than was, even when living with their biological family, dominated by poor health conditions, child labor, delinquency, poverty and failed families. However, the 20th century brought a stop to these developments. As industrialization proceeded, children were suddenly seen as what they are instead of “short adults”, reformers started to participate in “child saving movements”, education was recognized to be the key to social change and policies regarding the welfare of Americans were established. In 1909 the first White House conference dealing with “The Care of Dependent Children” took place under President Theodore Roosevelt, throughout which the government came up with the solution of establishing a foster care and adoption program as well as creating a federal Children's Bureau. It was not until 1990 that the UN Convention on the Rights of the Child came into effect.

These positive developments regarding child welfare allowed children's homes to thrive and develop in the early and mid-1900s (see positive examples). Throughout the past decades thousands of children could be served by several organizations that have managed to develop a loving environment, created by motivated staff members, trying to make a difference in children's lives. They keep children who are too broken to "function" in a foster or adoptive family environment, but yet not mentally instable enough to necessarily be labeled by a treatment facility, from falling through the gap as well as help keeping siblings together. In cooperation with the foster care and adoption system, children's homes today can add to a high-quality out-of-home care and child welfare system.

Changes do take their time and there are certainly organizations that still do not operate perfectly ethically today. A means of identifying whether an organization is qualified for taking care of children or not can be to look at their accreditation (e.g. offered by the Council Of Accreditation), which due to high costs and effort, strict regulations as well as on-site assessments ensures the quality of a program.

In the early 2000s, Florida tried to preserve families by providing wrap-around services and not taking children away from their parents. This resulted in the death of 477 children, as social workers cannot possibly provide a 24h-service to all the families they are responsible for. Additionally, the child maltreatment report of 2016 states a number of 1,539 children that have been maltreated by their foster parents that year, within 51 reporting states.

== Advantages of children's homes ==
In a children's home, frequent internal as well as external audits and quality controls aim at identifying and eliminating deficits of any kind. As soon as word spreads out about the abuse of a child, the staff member concerned will be removed immediately and no further harm will be made.

The required hours for foster parents vary between the states, ranging from 4 to 30 hours. Still, there are holes regarding documentation as well as several means of “waiving and modifying” training requirements. This is the case, even though a vast majority of foster children come from places of neglect and maltreatment, showing a variety of behavioral problems and (mental) health issues.

Studies show that sibling relationships are crucial, especially in foster care, when family relationships are damaged and a child has only his/her siblings to rely on. Still, studies estimate that more than half of US children in foster care have one or more siblings in the system, but between 60 and 73 percent of sibling groups are not accommodated together. This can be due to too many siblings (no foster family that is willing to accommodate all of them available), different entry dates in foster care, a case worker that did not care to or could not find a placement that would allow the siblings to stay together (entering the foster system together often means staying together and vice versa), different (medical) needs as well as foster parents only taking in a certain age group or sex.

As children's homes have more room available than a foster family does and employ well-trained staff as well as offer more opportunities for adapting to the needs of each individual child, these facilities have the chance to keep siblings together.

Many children have difficulties with adapting to their foster or adoptive families, which is due to their experiences (multiple movements, abuse, neglect, etc.), but their behavioral issues are not severe enough to necessarily put them into restrictive placements, labeling them for the rest of their life.

Children's homes are not restrictive placements in any way. Staff members do not expect immediate love as some adoptive parents do and are trained to identify, accept and deal with difficult behavior. This makes coping with the new environment easier for many children that are not used to a “normal” family life.

Children's homes often have a big network of donors and supporters as well as the possibility to build up a variety of facilities and opportunities, as there is not one single family, but several “families” and staff members cooperating to achieve their goal. This can provide the children in their care with unique opportunities, such as a work program (including learning how to apply), special events and leisure activities sponsored and/or provided by supporters, scholarships, mentoring programs and many other opportunities. This ensures that “lives are turned around”, increasing the probability of these foster children to succeed and teach their own children how to succeed in life.

== Criticism ==
In the past decades, several cases of abuse within residential child care have occurred all over the world, putting this type of care into a bad light. There have been reports of abuse and neglect, “lock-away” facilities, staff that cannot control children, runaways, and regular police visits. Additionally, residential child care is often confused with treatment facilities, making the term look very restrictive, like every child is mentally ill and locked away.

As children's homes are more costly than foster care, adoption, wrap-around services and kinship care, there have been pushes to decrease their use. Studies show that the United States foster system can cause and enforce mental issues, as every additional relocation a child has to go through increases the probability of these. This increases financial burden due to medical costs. The vast majority of organizations providing residential child care services are non-profit.

== See also ==
- Orphanage
- Teaching-family model
- Group homes
- Congregate care
- Cottage Homes
- Family support
- Foster care
- Foster care in the United States
- Residential treatment center
- Residential care
- Community-based care
- Child and family services
- Kinship care
- Child and youth care
- Child abuse
- Child abandonment
- Wraparound (childcare)
- Boys Town (organization)
- SOS Children's Villages
