= Wraparound (childcare) =

Care management process for youths with serious or complex needs

The wraparound process is an intensive, individualized care management process for youths with serious or complex needs. Wraparound was initially developed in the 1980s as a means for maintaining youth with the most serious emotional and behavioral problems in their home and community. During the wraparound process, a team of individuals who are relevant to the well-being of the child or youth (e.g., family members, other natural supports, service providers, and agency representatives) collaboratively develop an individualized plan of care, implement this plan, and evaluate success over time. The wraparound plan typically includes formal services and interventions, together with community services and interpersonal support and assistance provided by friends, kin, and other people drawn from the family's social networks. The team convenes frequently to measure the plan's components against relevant indicators of success. Plan components and strategies are revised when outcomes are not being achieved.

The process of engaging the family, convening the team, developing the plan, implementing the plan, and transitioning the youth out of formal wraparound is typically facilitated by a trained care manager or “wraparound facilitator,” sometimes with the assistance of a family support worker. The wraparound process, and the plan itself, is designed to be culturally competent, strengths based, and organized around family members’ own perceptions of needs, goals, and likelihood of success of specific strategies.

== History ==
Wraparound was initially developed in the 1980s. In recent years it has been applied within many child-serving settings as a way to improve outcomes for children and adolescents with serious emotional disturbance, autism spectrum disorders and behavioral disorders. For example, it has been used as a means to facilitate permanency outcomes for youth involved in the child welfare system, to reduce recidivism for youths involved in the juvenile justice system, and to improve academic success for youths in the special educational system.

During the wraparound process, a team of individuals who are relevant to the well-being of the child or youth (e.g., family members and other natural supports, service providers, and agency representatives) collaboratively develop an individualized plan of care, implement this plan, and evaluate success over time. The wraparound plan typically includes formal services and interventions, together with community services and interpersonal support and assistance provided by friends, kin, and other people drawn from the family's social networks. The team convenes frequently to measure the plan's components against relevant indicators of success. Plan components and strategies are revised when outcomes are not being achieved.

The process of engaging the family, convening the team, developing the plan, implementing the plan, and transitioning the youth out of formal wraparound is typically facilitated by a trained care-manager or "wraparound facilitator", sometimes with the assistance of a family-support worker. The wraparound process, and the plan itself, is designed to be culturally competent, strengths-based, and organized around family members' own perceptions of needs, goals, and likelihood of success of specific strategies.

Wraparound has been implemented nationally for over 20 years and presented as a promising practice in many publications. However, specification and consistent implementation of the model has occurred only in the past few years. In some states, wraparound refers to in-home behavioral support services. The wraparound process, however, as recently specified, is conceived as a four phase process:

- engagement and team preparation
- initial plan development
- plan implementation
- transition

The full description of the activities that typically take place in each of these phases can be found in "Phases and Activities of the Wraparound Process", a document available on the website of the National Wraparound Initiative.

== Implementation essentials ==
Wraparound is intended to ensure that youth with complex needs (and multiple agency involvement) benefit from a coordinated care planning process that produces a single plan of care that cuts across all agencies and providers. Wraparound plans and wraparound teams require access to flexible resources and a well-developed array of services and supports in the community. As a result, wraparound implementation requires that the child-serving system is supportive of wraparound. Some of the key types of community and system supports include:

- Community partnership: Key stakeholder groups, including agencies, providers, and representatives of youths and families have joined together in a collaborative effort to plan and implement wraparound.
- Collaborative action: Stakeholders involved in the wraparound effort take concrete steps to translate the wraparound philosophy into concrete policies, practices and achievements.
- Fiscal Policies: The community has developed fiscal strategies to support the wraparound effort and to better meet the needs of children and youth participating in the wraparound effort
- Access to needed supports and services: The community has developed mechanisms for ensuring access to the services and supports that wraparound teams need to fully implement their plans.
- Human Resource Development and Support: The system supports wraparound staff and partner agency staff to work in a manner that allows full implementation of the wraparound model.
- Accountability. The community has implemented mechanisms to monitor wraparound fidelity, service quality, and outcomes, and to oversee the quality and development of the overall wraparound effort.

In addition to system supports, the wraparound process requires skilled facilitators and family support partners who have the right working conditions to do their jobs. As a result, the lead agency responsible for implementing the wraparound process for families must support implementation in several key ways, including maintaining adequately low caseload sizes; ensuring that primary staff receive comprehensive training and skill development; supporting wraparound team efforts to get necessary members to attend meetings and participate collaboratively; and making timely decisions regarding funding for strategies developed by teams to meet families’ unique needs.

== Services that are often made available to support implementation ==
- Mobile therapy services

Intensive psychotherapy sessions provided by a master's level therapist. These services are provided to the child and the family in non-clinical, community settings such as the home, school, or a community setting.

- Behavioral specialist consulting

A specialized service provided by a master's-level clinician trained in behavior strategies. The consultant works with the family, school, and others to develop a behavioral modification plan specific to each child.

- Therapeutic staff support

One-on-one assistance to children and families while implementing the child's individual treatment plan in the home, school or community. Support staff are supervised by the BSC.

- Psychological evaluations

Psychological testing service provides a comprehensive assessment of intellectual and personality functioning as an adjunct to treatment or to assist in making a differential diagnostic and treatment plan. Assessment includes but is not limited to personality, intelligence, developmental, vocational, disability and bariatric testing.

== Program evaluation and evidence for effectiveness ==
The wraparound process has been implemented widely across the United States and internationally because of the documentation of its successful use in several communities, its alignment with the value base for systems of care, and its resonance with families and family advocates. However, the formal wraparound research base has been slow to develop because of several reasons: (1) its status as a care management process rather than a focal treatment for a specific disorder; (2) its grassroots development rather than development by a single research team; and (3) its individualized nature, in that the identified needs and specific strategies for each family participating in wraparound should be unique. Thus, at the current juncture, there is some consensus that the research base on wraparound is largely positive but that more rigorous evaluation is needed (Farmer, Dorsey, & Mustillo, (2004)).

At the same time, the research base on wraparound continues to expand and evolve:

- To date, positive results have been found from three published experimental studies, six published quasi-experimental studies, and numerous pre-post longitudinal studies.
- The wraparound process has been cited as a promising practice in Surgeon General’s reports on both youth violence and mental health.
- Since the wraparound practice model has been more fully specified, four random assignment control studies have been begun in four different locations, all with a consistent practice model and training and coaching model. Fidelity measures aligned with the wraparound model described above are also now available and in use in all the above studies.

A review of outcomes studies as of 2002 is provided in Burchard, Bruns, & Burchard (2002), and is currently being updated. Other reviews and information are available at the National Wraparound Initiative website (see, for example, Suter & Bruns, 2008, at http://www.rtc.pdx.edu/NWI-book/pgChapter3.shtml). A summary table of published wraparound evaluation studies is provided at the end of this entry.

== Resources ==
The wraparound process is not proprietary. The website of the National Wraparound Initiative includes a description of the practice model, as well as many implementation resources compiled from trainers, technical assistance providers, and program sites nationally. The NWI website also includes a list of consultants and trainers that communities and organizations may wish to access. More comprehensive examples of how wraparound has been implemented in schools can be found at the Illinois Positive Behavioral Support network website, and in Eber (2003). Information about implementation and fidelity measures for wraparound can be found at the Wraparound Evaluation and Research Team's website at. Pennsylvania's Department of Public Welfare has adopted this methodology for at risk youth.

=== Training and technical assistance ===
Many communities and programs have been trained and coached by experts on the wraparound process to successfully implement the wraparound process. Typical curricula include initial 4 day training sessions for staff (e.g., facilitators and parent partners) followed by shadowing of experienced staff, and in-vivo coaching. Supervisors also receive a series of human resource development activities so they can collect data about staff performance and support staff over the long term via intensive group and individual supervision, as well as ongoing coaching.

=== High Fidelity Wraparound ===
High Fidelity Wraparound utilizes a specific model of the wraparound concept. There are several different models which have been created, but they all demonstrate fidelity towards specific principles of the concept. For instance, the National Wraparound Implementation Center model of High Fidelity Wraparound specifies phases to the process of intervention with a family. It has a specific theory of change as well as a set of ten principles (family voice and choice, collaboration, team based, natural supports, community based, cultural competence, individualized services, persistence, strengths based, and outcomes based). Service providers are evaluated for their fidelity to a specific model through credentialing of documents, meetings, and demonstration of concepts. The fidelity demonstrates best practices for interventions with families.

== Summary of Published Controlled Studies of the Wraparound Process ==
STUDY 1: Randomized control study (18 months) of youth in child welfare custody in Florida: 54 in wraparound vs. 78 in standard practice foster care.

References: Clark, Lee, Prange, & McDonald, 1996; Clark et al., 1998.

RESULTS: Significantly fewer placement changes for youths in the wraparound program, fewer days on runaway, fewer days incarcerated (for subset of incarcerated youths), and older youths were significantly more likely to be in a permanency plan at follow-up. No group differences were found on rate of placement changes, days absent, or days suspended. No differences on internalizing problems, but boys in wraparound showed significantly greater improvement on externalizing problems than the comparison group. Taken together, the findings provided moderate evidence for better outcomes for the wraparound program; however, differences appear somewhat limited to boys and externalizing problems.

STUDY 2: Matched comparison study (18 months) of youth in child welfare custody in Nevada: 33 in wraparound vs. 32 receiving MH services as usual

References: Bruns, Rast, Walker, Bosworth, & Peterson, 2006; Rast, Bruns, Brown, Peterson, & Mears (in submission).

RESULTS: After 18 months, 27 of the 33 youth (approximately 82%) who received wraparound moved to less restrictive environments, compared to only 12 of the 32 comparison group youth (approximately 38%), and family members were identified to provide care for 11 of the 33 youth in the wraparound group compared to only six in the comparison group. Mean CAFAS scores for youth in wraparound decreased significantly across all waves of data collection (6, 12, 18 months) in comparison to the traditional services group. More positive outcomes were also found for the wraparound cohort on school attendance, school disciplinary actions, and grade point averages. No significant differences were found in favor of the comparison group.

STUDY 3: Randomized control study (18 months) of “at risk” and juvenile justice involved (adjudicated) youth in Ohio: 73 in wraparound vs. 68 in conventional services

Reference: Carney & Buttell, 2003.

RESULTS: Study supported the hypothesis that youth who received wraparound services were less likely to engage in subsequent at-risk and delinquent behavior. The youth who received wraparound services did not miss school unexcused, get expelled or suspended from school, run away from home, or get picked up by the police as frequently as the youth who received the juvenile court conventional services. There were, however, no significant differences, in formal criminal offenses.

STUDY 4: Matched comparison study (>2 years) of youth involved in juvenile justice and receiving MH services: 110 youth in wraparound vs. 98 in conventional MH services

Reference: Pullmann, Kerbs, Koroloff, Veach-White, Gaylor, & Sieler, 2006.

RESULTS: Youths in the comparison group were three times more likely to commit a felony offense than youths in the wraparound group. Among youth in the wraparound program, 72% served detention “at some point in the 790 day post identification window” (p. 388), while all youth in the comparison group served detention. And of youth in the Connections program who did serve detention, they did so significantly less often than their peers. Connections youth also took three times longer to recidivate than those in the comparison group. According to the authors, a previous study by Pullman and colleagues showed “significant improvement on standardized measures of behavioral and emotional problems, increases in behavioral and emotional strengths, and improved functioning at home at school, and in the community” (p. 388) among Connections youth.

STUDY 5: Randomized control study (12 months) of youths referred to out-of-home placements for serious mental health problems in New York State: 27 to family centered intensive case management (wraparound) vs. 15 to treatment foster care.

References: Evans, Armstrong, & Kuppinger, 1996; Evans, Armstrong, Kuppinger, Huz, & McNulty, 1998

RESULTS: Significant group differences were found in favor of the case management/ wraparound program for behavioral and mood functioning. No differences were found, however, with respect to behavior problems (internalizing and externalizing), family cohesiveness, or self-esteem. No differences found in favor of the TFC group. Overall, small sample size plus loss of data on many of the outcome measures resulted in the study having very low power to detect differences between groups.

STUDY 6: Quasi-experimental (6 months) study in Department of Defense demonstration site of youths with serious mental health issues: 71 in wraparound group vs. 40 in comparison group (study refusers/ineligible youths).

Reference: Bickman, Smith, Lambert, & Andrade, 2003

RESULTS: Findings included higher utilization of “wraparound services” (e.g., case management, in-home supports, and nontraditional services) for the demonstration group, higher costs for the demonstration group (primarily due to this group remaining in treatment longer), and no consistent differences between the groups on outcome measures (e.g., behavior, functioning, caregiver strain, perceived social support, family environment). Limitations of this study include the short time span (6 months) and whether the demonstration project truly followed the wraparound process. Authors stated the “wrap” condition had access to informal services and flexible funding, but authors did not assess “wrapness” and stated that, “there is no evidence that the content or the quality of the services were different for the Wraparound children.” (p. 151)

STUDY 7: Quasi-experimental (24 months) study of youths with serious mental health issues in urban Baltimore: 45 returned or diverted from residential care to wraparound vs. 24 comparison.

Reference: Hyde, Burchard, & Woodworth, 1996.

RESULTS: Primary outcome was a single rating that combined several indicators: restrictiveness of youth living situation, school attendance, job/job training attendance, and serious problem behaviors. Youths received ratings of “good” if they were living in regular community placements, attending school and/or working for the majority of the week, and had fewer than three days of serious behavior problems during the course of previous month. At 2-year follow-up, 47% of the wraparound groups received a rating of good, compared to 8% of youths in traditional MH services. Limitations of the study include study attrition and group non-equivalence at baseline.

STUDY 8: Quasi-experimental (multiple-baseline case study) of four youths referred to wraparound because of serious mental health issues in rural Michigan.

Reference: Myaard, Crawford, Jackson, & Alessi (2000).

RESULTS: The multiple baseline case study design was used to evaluate the impact of wraparound by assessing whether outcome change occurred with (and only with) the introduction of wraparound at different points in time. The authors tracked occurrence of five behaviors (compliance, peer interactions, physical aggression, alcohol and drug use, and extreme verbal abuse) for each of the youths. Participants began receiving wraparound after 12, 15, 19, and 22 weeks. For all four participants, on all five behaviors, dramatic improvements occurred immediately following the introduction of wraparound.

== See also ==
- Orphanage
- Residential Child Care Community
- Group homes
- Congregate Care
- Cottage Homes
- Family support
- Foster Care
- Foster Care in the United States
- Residential treatment center
- Residential Care
- Community-based care
- Child and family services
- Kinship Care
- Child and youth care
- Child abuse
- Child abandonment
- Teaching-family model
