= NWI =

The abbreviation NWI represents, among other things,

- N.W.I., the former Netherlands West Indies, a.k.a. Netherlands Antilles
- Newsworld International, cable TV news channel
- Norwich Airport, IATA airport code
- National Wraparound Initiative
- North West Island, a coral cay in the southern Great Barrier Reef
- Northwest Industries Inc., aerospace company
- New World Interactive, video game company
- Northwest Indiana region
- National Wind Institute, a research center at Texas Tech University
- The Times of Northwest Indiana
- Nick Westbrook-Ikhine, an American football wide receiver
