= Care home =

Care home may refer to:

- Nursing home, a facility for nursing care for the sick or infirm
- Residential care facility, for those needing social protection
