= Residential treatment center =

Inpatient behavioral health facility

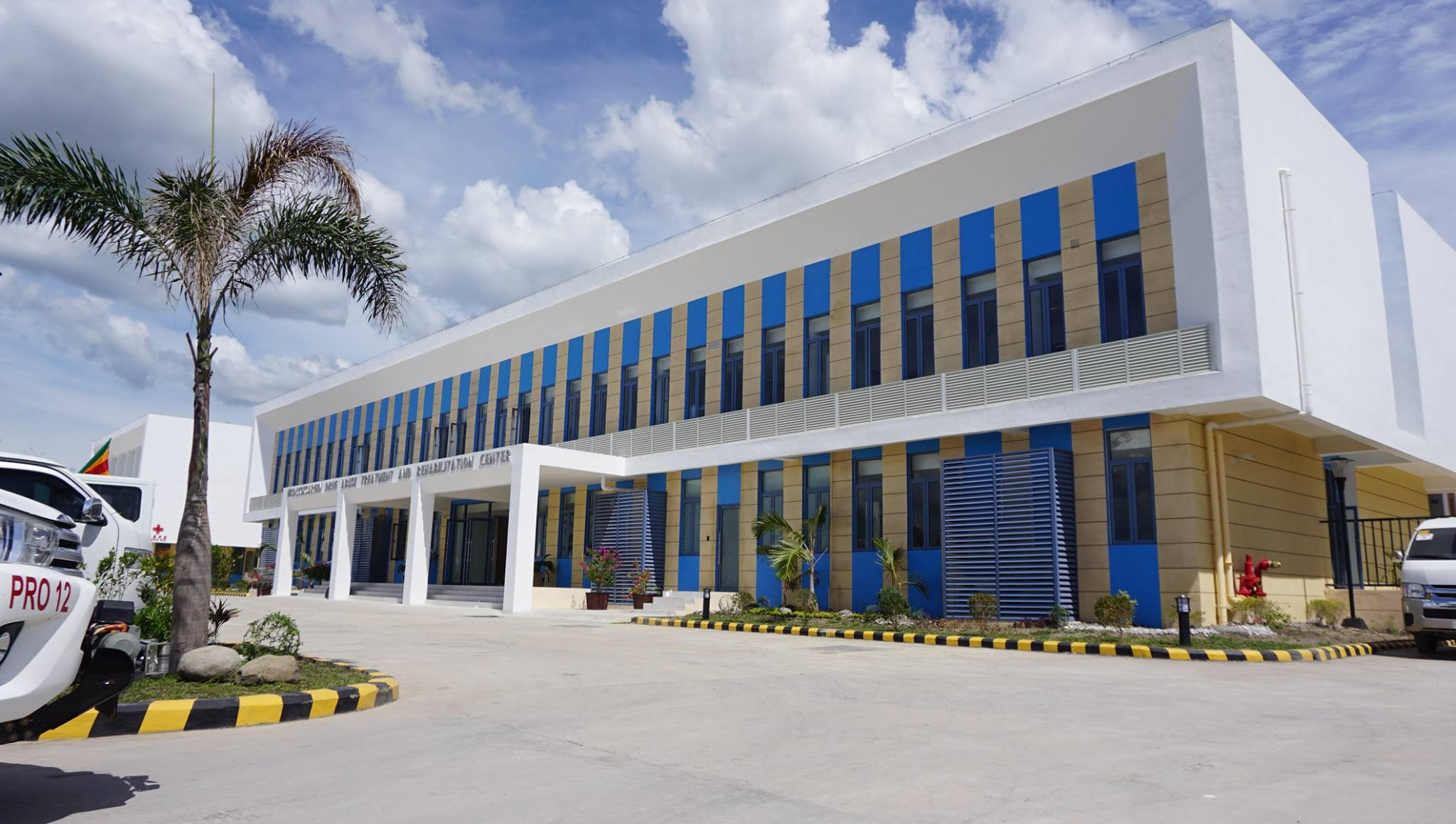
The SOCCSKSARGEN Drug Abuse Treatment and Rehabilitation Center in Alabel, Philippines

A residential treatment center (RTC), or residential treatment facility (RTF) is a live-in health care facility providing therapy for substance use disorders, mental illness, or other behavioral problems. These are also known as rehabilitation centers. Residential treatment is considered a "last-ditch" approach to treating addiction or psychopathology. Treatment for adults typically lasts for up to 90 days. Upon discharge, the patient may be enrolled in an intensive outpatient program for follow-up outside the residential setting.

Youth residential treatment centers in contrast tend to be involuntary, with children unable to leave by choice. They may be held in a treatment center for years, or until they reach the age of majority. Youth centers are controversial as they tend not to be run by medical professionals, their benefits are contested, and children suffer routine harm including seclusion, physical restraint, and abuse.

== Youth residential treatment centers ==
Youth residential treatment centers can treat multiple conditions from drug and alcohol addictions to emotional and physical disorders as well as mental illnesses.

=== Target Diagnoses and Program Models ===
Centers often deal with addiction, and can provide treatment for issues and disorders such as oppositional defiant disorder, conduct disorder, depression, bipolar disorder, attention deficit hyperactivity disorder, reactive attachment disorder, and personality disorders.

Generalist programs can be large (80-plus patients and as many as 250) and are often level-focused in their treatment approach. That is, to manage patients' behavior, they frequently put systems of rewards and punishments in place, with higher "level" students rewarded with the authority to manage the lower level ones. Most centers use a behavior modification paradigm. Others are relationally oriented. Some use a community or positive peer-culture model.

Specialist programs may have as few as 10 or 12 students and are typically not as focused on behavior modification.

=== Facility Types and Security levels ===
Residential treatment centers generally are clinically focused and primarily provide behavior management and treatment for adolescents with serious issues. Some RTCs are lock-down facilities; that is, the residents are locked inside the premises. In a locked residential treatment facility, patients' movements are restricted. By comparison, an unlocked residential treatment facility allows them to move about the facility with relative freedom, but they are only allowed to leave the facility under specific conditions.

=== Therapeutic boarding schools ===
Long-term residential treatment centers that don't allow residents to leave to attend school are sometimes called therapeutic boarding schools, and offer some limited form of education within the center. As with wilderness therapy programs, boarding schools are largely unregulated, so some treatment centers have rebranded as boarding schools to avoid the need to maintain a standard of care. Despite being called schools, educational options vary widely, from a few hours a day of self-study to classes with accredited teachers. This is not be confused with traditional boarding schools, which offer a formal environment for children to live and learn together outside their homes, focused on classes and learning.

Numerous residential programs have been faced with lawsuits and allegations of abuse and neglect, including the deaths of students due to excessive physical restraint. Recent studies suggest that residential treatment facilities need more input from therapists and behavioral psychologists to improve outcomes and lessen unethical practices.

== Types of treatment or intervention ==
=== Behavioral interventions for children ===
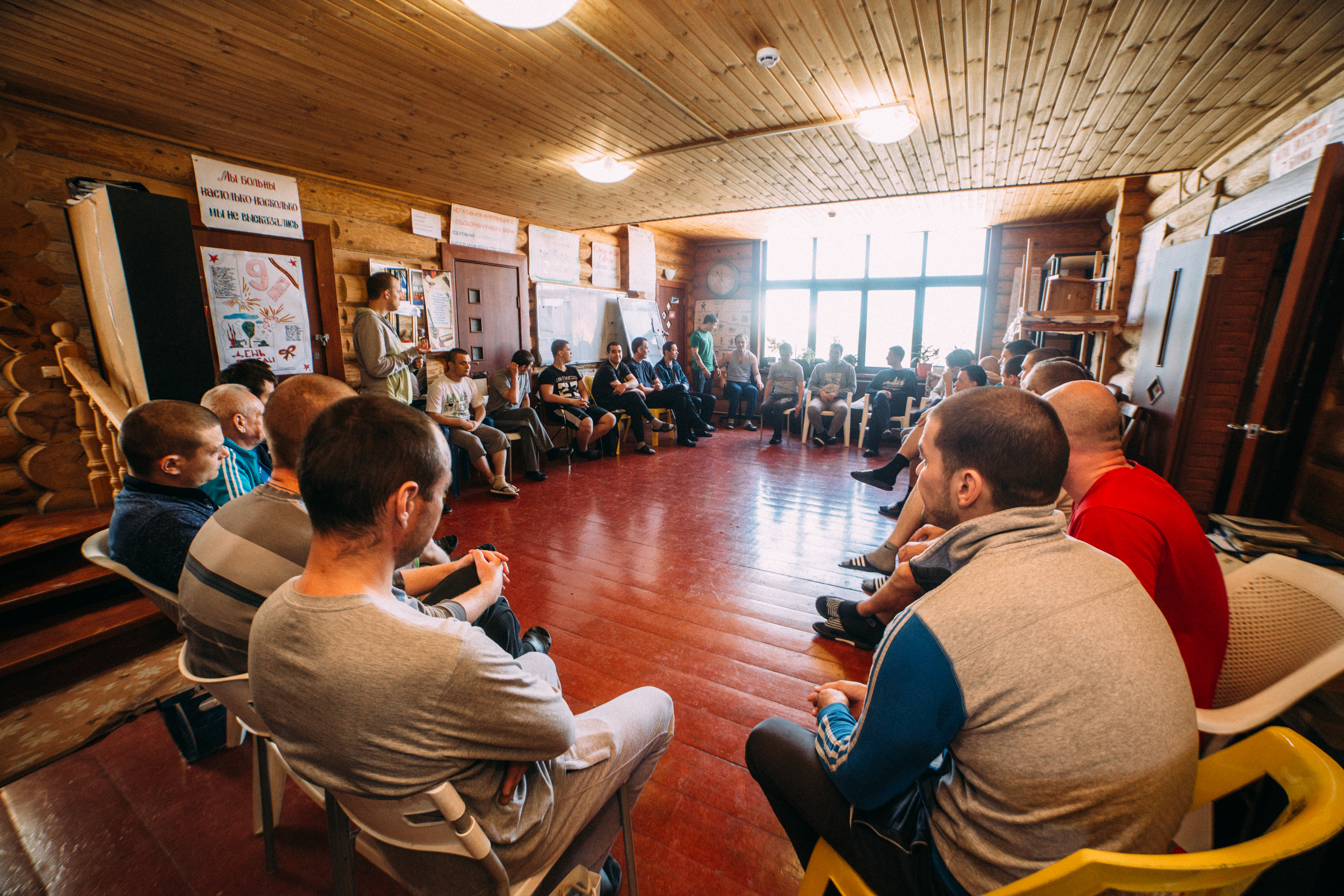
A therapeutic self-help group at the Rehab Center Parus in Moscow

Behavioral interventions are common in residential treatment centers. The type of clients receiving services in a facility (children with emotional or behavioral disorders versus intellectual disability versus psychiatric disorders) is a factor in the effectiveness of behavior modification.

Certain populations may benefit more from interventions that fall outside of the behavior-modification paradigm. Positive outcomes have been reported for neurosequential interventions targeting issues of early childhood trauma and attachment. (Perry, 2006). Interventions such as response cost, token economies, social skills training groups, and the use of positive social reinforcement can be used to increase prosocial behavior in children (Ormrod, 2009). When children have acquired extensive knowledge, it affects what they notice and how they organize, represent, and interpret information in their current environment (Bransford, Brown, & Cocking, 2000).

Wolfe, Dattilo, & Gast (2003) found that using a token economy in concert with cooperative games increased pro-social behaviors (e.g. statements of encouragement, praise, or appreciation, shaking hands, and giving high fives) while decreasing anti-social ones (swearing, threatening peers with physical harm, name-calling, and physical aggression). Wilhite & Bullock (2012) implemented a social-skills training group to increase the social competence of students with EBDs. Results showed significant differences between pre- and post-intervention disciplinary referrals. Evidence also exists for the usefulness of social reinforcement as a part of behavioral interventions for children with ADHD.

=== Narrative Therapy ===
Narrative therapy is a type of family therapy expressed in four principles: (a) not one universal reality exists, but socially constructed reality; (b) reality is created by language; (c) narrative maintains reality (d) not all narratives are equivalent (Freedman and Combs, 1996). Narrative family therapy views human issues from those roots as emerging and being sustained by dominant stories that control the life of an individual. Problems arise when individual stories do not match with their experience of living. According to the narrative viewpoint, by offering a new and distinct perspective

In a problem-saturated narrative, therapy is a process of rewriting personal narratives. The process of rewriting the narrative of the client involves (a) expressing the problem(s) they are experiencing; (b) breaking down narratives that trigger problems through questioning; (c) recognizing special outcomes or occasions where a person has not been constrained by their situation; (d) connecting specific results to the future and providing an alternate and desired narrative; (e) inviting supports among the community to spectate the new narrative and (f) logging new document. Some researchers have described techniques that are useful in helping an individual rewrite a specific experience, like retelling stories and writing letters.

Children admitted to a residential treatment center may have behavior problems so extreme that residential treatment is seen as their last hope. Parents generally see the child as a problem needing to be fixed, while the child generally sees themselves as a victim. Narrative therapy enables these perspectives to be broken down and troubling behaviors of the child to be externalized, which could encourage both the child and the family members to achieve a new perspective no one feels prosecuted or blamed.

=== Multi-systemic Therapy ===
Multi-systemic therapy for youth tries to simultaneously address dynamics in the family and in peer groups. This can be pursued in a residential setting where the family visits and participates. The method's ultimate objectives include enhancing family functioning, strengthening the child's ability to perform better at school and other community settings, and decreasing or eliminating out-of-home placement.

== Controversies ==
Disability rights organizations, such as the National Disability Rights Network [NDRN] and Bazelon Center for Mental Health Law, oppose the placement of youth in RTC programs, calling into question the appropriateness and efficacy of such placements, noting the failure of such programs to address problems in the child's home and community environment, and calling attention to systemic abuse, limited mental-health services offered, and substandard educational programs. Bazelon promotes community-based services on the basis that they are more effective and less costly than residential placement.

In the United States, therapeutic boarding schools in states which do not regulate their operation have had a series of high-profile controversies and lawsuits. A series of reports by the Government Accountability Office (GAO) found cases involving serious abuse and neglect at some of these programs, contributing in some cases to the deaths of children in the programs. Reported cases include

- homicide,
- medical neglect,
- inappropriate discipline techniques, and
- restricted communication such as lack of access to child protection and advocacy hotlines.

The reports also found a general lack of monitoring of staff, lack of regulation of the industry, deceptive marketing practices by the schools and deceptive communications of the schools with families of students.

In 2007 and 2008, a broad coalition of grass-roots efforts, as well as prominent medical and psychological organizations such as the Alliance for the Safe, Therapeutic and Appropriate use of Residential Treatment (ASTART) and the Community Alliance for the Ethical Treatment of Youth (CAFETY), provided testimony and support that led to the creation of the Stop Child Abuse in Residential Programs for Teens Act of 2008 by the United States Congress Committee on Education and Labor. In particular, Jon Martin-Crawford and Kathryn Whitehead of CAFETY testified to abusive practices they experienced at the Family Foundation School and Mission Mountain School.

Due to the absence of regulation of these programs by the federal government and because at that time many were not subject to state licensing or monitoring, in 2009 the Federal Trade Commission issued a guide for parents considering such placement. The lack of federal or state regulation is regularly cited as a reason to invest in the industry. From the NDRN report on Conditions of Children Placed in For Profit Residential Facilities:

[I]t is possible for facility operators to bypass facility licensing requirements “by self-identifying their business as a type that is exempt from state licensing.” Through 2007, for example, Utah did not require licensing for therapeutic wilderness camps programming. As a result, it contained more than 25% of all such programs within the United States. Crucially... consulting firm Bain & Company describes the “favorable regulatory environment” as a reason for continued private equity investment in behavioral health.

== Research on effectiveness ==
Involuntary residential treatment facilities are controversial, and many have been sued for abuse, neglect, or deceptive marketing. While some studies have found that involuntary treatment can be effective for individuals with a long history of addictive behavior or criminal activity, teenagers without such a history regularly regret being sent there and can blame the facilities for causing them life-long mental harm.

Participants in a pilot program employing family-driven care and positive peer modeling displayed no self-injurious behaviors or physical aggression, and just one case of property destruction, when compared to a control group (Holstead, 2010). The success of treatment for children in RTCs depends heavily on their background i.e., their state, situation, circumstances and behavioral status before commencement of treatment. Children who displayed lower rates of internalizing and externalizing behavior problems at intake and had a lower level of exposure to negative environmental factors (e.g., domestic violence, parental substance use, high crime rates), showed better results than children whose symptoms were more severe (den Dunnen, 2012).

Planned treatment, or knowing the expected duration of treatment, is strongly correlated with positive treatment outcomes. Long-term results for children using planned treatment showed that they are 21% less likely to engage in criminal behavior and 40% less likely to need hospitalization for mental-health problems (Lindqvist, 2010). Further evidence exists supporting the long-term effectiveness of RTCs for children exhibiting severe mental health issues.

Little is known about the outcomes-monitoring practices of such facilities. Those that track clients after they leave the RTC only do so for an average of six months. Preyde (2011) found that clients showed a statistically significant reduction in symptom severity 12–18 months after leaving an RTC, results which were maintained 36–40 months after their discharge from the facility.

== See also ==
- Anti-psychiatry
- Behavior modification facility
- Child abandonment
- Child abuse
- Child and family services
- Child and Youth Care
- Community-based care
- Congregate care
- Cottage Homes
- Family support
- Foster care in the United States
- Foster care
- Group home
- Kinship care
- Orphanage
- Residential care
- Residential child care community
- Teaching-family model
- Therapeutic boarding school
- Total institution
- Wraparound (childcare)
- Wilderness therapy
