= Child and family services =

Child and family services (CFS) is a government or non-profit organisation designed to better the well being of individuals who come from unfortunate situations, environmental or biological. People who seek or are sought after to participate in these homes have no other resource to turn to. Children might come from abusive or neglectful homes, or live in very poor and dangerous communities. There are also agencies that cater to people who have biological deficiencies. Families that are trying to live in stable lives come to non-profit organisations for hope of a better future. Child and family services cater to many different types of people who are all in different situations. These services might be mandated through the courts via a governmental child protection agency or they might be voluntary. Child and family services may be mandated if:

- There is domestic violence in the home
- There is abuse or neglect in the home
- There is constant negativity amongst family members which could lead to violent behavior
  - Physical abuse
  - Emotional abuse
  - Sexual abuse

== Two-generation family strategies ==
Census data shows that in the United States almost half of all children live in low-income families. Research suggests a critical connection between parent well-being and the child's emotional, physical, and economic well-being; as well as, a connection to the child's educational and workforce success. Despite the crucial connection between parent and child well-being, many services designed to help low-income families target either the parent or the child, leaving someone behind. Two-generation family programs coordinate services that aid low-income parents and children simultaneously, putting the whole family on a path to success.

Two generation family services aim to end the inter-generational cycle of poverty by moving families to economic stability and security through education, workforce training, and related support services. Though each two generation program approach is different they all have three intentionally linked components: education and/or job training for parents that leads to family-supporting employment, high quality early childhood education, and family support services.

=== Parent education and job training ===
Two generation family programs aim to get parents to a place of economic stability and security where they can secure employment that enables them to support their family and improve child outcomes. Programs aid parents in getting to economic security through education and job training opportunities. Two generation program educational opportunities typically involve general educational development (GED) courses, and connections to post-secondary education supports, such as, financial aid or access to full-day childcare. In addition to education services, two generation family programs often utilize sector-based workforce development. This type of workforce development targets job training for specific industries that will meet regional workforce needs, increasing the chances that graduates of the program will be able to find work.

=== High-quality early childhood education ===
Two generation family programs include high quality early childhood education that nurtures children's learning and development. Investing in high quality early childhood education that extends from pre-K through third grade improves educational achievement throughout schooling and success in the workforce. Programs can utilize existing early childhood development programs (i.e. Early Start or Head Start) and add two-generation elements such as offering full-day/full-year services to support working parents.

=== Family support services ===
Two-generation family programs offer comprehensive wraparound services to support families. Examples of these support services include access to physical and mental health services for children, career coaches, case managers, family planning, and food assistance. These services aim to help expand family resources and support networks.

== Corruption concerns ==
Former Georgia Senator Nancy Schaefer was a vocal critic of the corruption that the Adoption and Safe Families Act incentivized in all US child protection organizations. She argued that the thousands of dollars in adoption bonuses for every child they adopt out rewards such organizations with seizing children from and thwarting reunification efforts with the children's parents.

== Child care in the United States ==
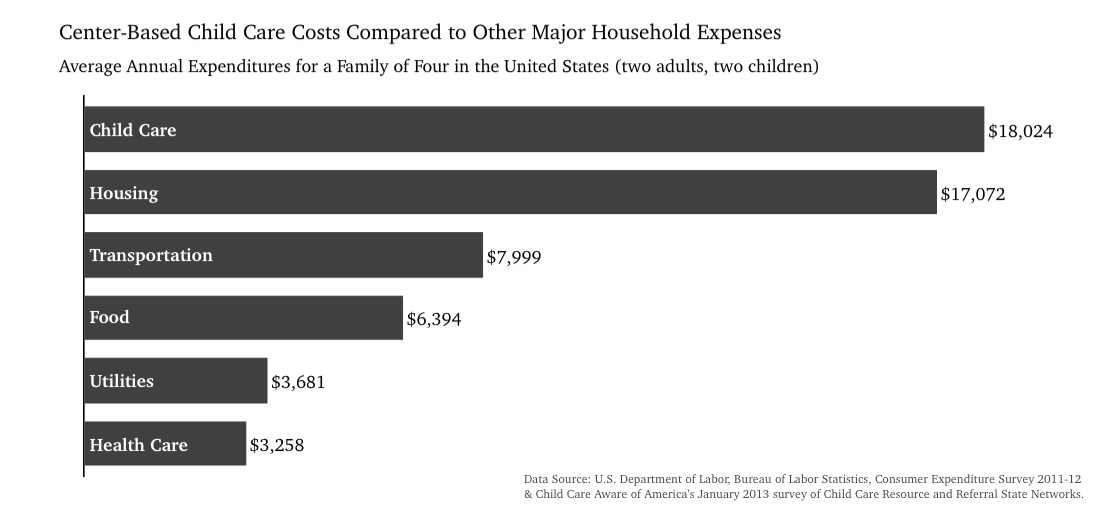
Average annual expenditures for a family of four in the United States (two adults, two children)

Research suggests that child care is a critical component of livable communities for many families in urban, suburban, and rural areas, and that local planning policies can play an important role in ensuring adequate child care. The majority of parents who work depend upon formal, organized out-of-home care.

Studies show that families are paying a significant part of their earnings for child care. Between 2011 and 2012, the cost of child care increased at up to eight times the rate of increases in family income. For a four-year-old child, center-based care ranges from about $4,300 in Mississippi to $12,350 in Massachusetts. Lower income families have been disproportionately affected by these increases in child care costs. Working families at or near the poverty line did not receive any or enough child care assistance to be able to stay employed and off welfare, and only 12% to 15% of eligible families were served by a Child Care Development Fund subsidy in 1998–1999.

=== Options for accessibility ===
Child care subsidies is an option used in many states to help parents pay for child care. These subsidies aid low-income families with children under age 13 in paying for child care so that parents can work or participate in training or education activities. Parents typically receive subsidies in the form of vouchers that they can use with a provider (e.g. relative, neighbor, child care center, or after-school program.)

Additional government programs aim to make child care more affordable. Medium and low income families receive earned income tax credits to compensate for money they allocated to child care arrangements. Individuals may claim up to $3,000 of expenses paid in a year for one qualifying individual (a dependent child age 12 or younger) or $6,000 for two or more qualifying individuals on their tax return. Benefits from the refundable Earned Income Tax Credit (EITC) concentrate on low-income families. In contrast, the dependent exemption and the virtually nonrefundable Child Tax Credit (CTC) benefited higher income families with benefits gradually increasing as a person's tax liability increased.

Universal child care is another way to make child care more widely accessible. For example, in Sweden, public childcare is guaranteed to all parents and it operates on a whole-day basis. Parental fees are directly proportional to parents' income and inversely proportional to the number of children in a family.

Finally, another viable option is to increase tax credits for low and medium income families. Currently, President Barack Obama has outlined a plan to triple the child tax care credit to $3,000 per young child.

== History ==
During most of the 19th century, destitute children were sent to institutions operated by private charitable organizations. Many of these private organizations were run by faith-based agencies and thus had religious connections, such as running religious services for the children or primarily serving children of a specific faith. Many poor or abandoned children were sent to live in almshouses, or poorhouses—facilities established in the 19th century in many large cities to house the very poor of all ages. Almshouses provided minimal standard of care to orphaned or needy children and to impoverished, insane, or diseased adults. The almshouses caused the children greater hardships because they were subject to disease and chaos.

The demands that urbanization, industrialization, and immigration placed on poor and working-class families in the late 19th century left many children unattended. Rural states relied on family placements to care for their own homeless or dependent children. This was a precursor for today's foster care system.

As a general progressive agenda of social reform was adapted in the early years if the 20th century, the approach of assisting parents to care for their children was more widely endorsed. A new policy was issued, stating, "No child should be removed from the home unless it is impossible to construct family conditions or to build and supplement family resources as to make the home safe for the child..." There is still evidence from the 19th century of abandoned children. A 137-year-old foundation for children called New York Foundling Asylum has recently discovered letters from the parents who had abandoned their children in front of the agency because they were unable to care for them. New York Foundling Asylum was a family service agency that cared for thousands of children who had no homes and needed help, otherwise they would have been left on the cold street. This foundation saved thousands of lives and set a tone for other private organizations to contribute as well.

== Prominent non-profit organizations ==
- Friends-International
- Metis Child and Family Services Society
- Save the Children
- UNICEF
- United Family Services
- War Child
- WE Charity
- World Vision

== See also ==
- Cinderella effect
- Child abandonment
- Child and Youth Care
- Community-based care
- Congregate care
- Cottage homes
- Family support
- Group homes
- Kinship care
- Residential treatment center
- Residential care
- Residential Child Care Community
- Social policy
- Teaching-family model
- Wraparound (childcare)
