= Community-based care =

Type of care programme for adolescents

Community-based care is an approach to child- and healthcare that emphasizes community involvement over state implementation. While implemented globally, this model had particular advantages for low-income countries that lack strong government support. Community-based care programs emphasize prevention by working to strengthen community coping capacities.

Community-based foster care serves as a "bridge" between orphanage and settlement house, allowing adolescents to stay with a family in their community. The guardians provide individual care and nurture in the context of a family and community.

Community-based care is an agency privatizing the Department of Children and Families function of providing care and services to children who have been abused, neglected or abandoned. The service this agency provides is supporting children and families in the child welfare system.

== Reasons for community-based care ==
1. Adolescents must learn to become self-reliant and self-directing. They need to continue to rely on their peers as the guardians provide guidance.
2. It is important for adolescents to develop an identity as this will help them decide what they will do in the future.
3. It is vital for guardians to make sure that adolescents learn to get along with their peers. If they do not, peer pressure may arise.

== Advantages ==
The main advantages of community-based care are as follows:

Cost-effectiveness: community-based care for orphans is a more cost-effective approach to orphan care because the emphasis is not on providing resources from outside, but rather identifying the existing resources in a community and building on those.

Community participation: There is an extremely high degree of community participation in community-based care programs because the onus is on communities to care for their own orphans. Extended families will frequently take sole responsibility for many orphans, using their own resources to provide accommodation, food, clothing, education and nurture. Neighbors and local organizations such as churches often make a tangible contribution by helping out struggling families with adolescent minding, advice and other contributions.

Connectedness: Community-based care allows adolescents to connect with others in their community.

== Examples ==
Africa: The FOCUS program run by Family AIDS Caring Trust in Zimbabwe has mobilized community volunteers to visit and encourage more than 4000 orphans.

THOKOMALA Orphan Care Organization in South Africa places six adolescents with a house mother in their community of origin re-creating family life for these adolescents. Everything is funded entirely through donations: https://web.archive.org/web/20120312190626/http://www.thokomala.org.za/

Bethany Children's Trust http://www.bethanychildrenstrust.fsnet.co.uk/index.htm has community-based care projects for orphans in Rwanda, South Africa, Uganda and Mozambique reaching thousands of orphans.

The Global Interfaith Partnership http://www.globalinterfaithpartnership.com provides multiple services for orphans and vulnerable children in western Kenya which insure food security, safe housing, uninterrupted education, and healthy psychosocial development.

Asia: Project HALO http://www.urbanhalo.org (Hope, Assistance and Love for Orphans) run by Servants to Asia's Urban Poor in Cambodia has mobilized the community to care for more than 1000 orphans.

== See also ==
- Orphanage
- Group homes
- Congregate Care
- Family support
- Foster Care
- Teaching-family model
- Child and family services
- Kinship Care
- Wraparound (childcare)
