= Teaching-family model =

Model of care

The Teaching-Family Model (TFM) is a model of care for people in foster care, residential treatment centers, and other residential youth and dependent adult care facilities. It centers provision of care around a married couple, known as teaching-parents, who co-habitate with the residents in the facility. This provides consistent treatment and models family-style daily life.

The model was developed in the 1960s through research at the University of Kansas by researchers included Montrose Wolf (the inventor of time-out as a tool to shape behavior) and Gary Timbers. The model has been replicated over 800 times, although not all of the replications have proven effective and successful.

== Overview ==
The model of care uses a family-style environment and applied behavior analysis to teach life skills. It is taught and promoted by the Teaching-Family Association (TFA), an organization founded in 1975 which accredits programs that teach the 15 standards of the model to practitioners. Residential youth facilities that use this model of care include Garfield Park Academy, Thornwell Home for Children, Kenosha Human Development Services, Presbyterian Hospitality House, The Children's Home of Cincinnati, Virginia Home for Boys and Girls, The Barium Springs Home For Children, Closer To Home Calgary, The Indiana United Methodist Children's Home, and Utah Youth Village.

== Research ==
Research into the Teaching-Family Model suggests it can reduce recidivism after treatment, and may reduce post-programming. It has been studied in residential treatment facilities and behavior modification facilities.

== See also ==
- Behavior modification facility
