= Child and Youth Care =

Profession aiding children and families

Child and Youth Care (CYC) is a profession which focuses on the developmental needs of children and families within the space and time of their daily lives. Child and Youth Care is primarily a way of working with others and practitioners can be found in a variety of roles including direct care, private practice, educator, trainer, writer, supervisor, manager, researcher, and more. They are sometimes known as Child and Youth Workers, Child and Youth Counselors, Youth Workers, or Child and Youth Care Workers. There are strong connections around the world between Child and Youth Care and Social Pedagogy.

== Global network ==
The International Child and Youth Care Network promotes reading, discussion, and networking among Child and Youth Care Practitioners through a monthly journal, 4000 member discussion group, and an archive of writing by and for Child and Youth Care Workers.

The Child and Youth Care Association of Newfoundland Labrador hosted the first Child and Youth Care World Conference in June 2013 in St. John's, Newfoundland and Labrador. The second Child and Youth Care World Conference was held in August 2016 in Vienna, Austria. The third Child and Youth Care World Conference will be held in January 2018 in Ventura, California (USA).

== Scope of practice ==
Child and Youth Care (CYC) practice primary objective is catering the client population to achieve the Max-Neef model of human needs satisfaction. This service includes skills in developing relationships, assessing needs and strengths, supporting children and families in the life space, and participating in systems interventions through direct care, supervision, administration, teaching, research, consultation and advocacy.

This springs from what used to be known as children's homes or children's institutions which in turn used to part of a city's "charitable" work for children and families who had no access to professional services. Resources for this were always extremely limited and minimally staffed and the service could seldom see beyond a bed with a bedside locker and minimal food and adult attention. There was little or no staff training, with child-staff ratios often being as poor as 1:30.

It was those same staff members who originally bootstrapped their own training programs by soliciting the help of well-intentioned social workers and teachers into voluntary training opportunities, and rudimentary syllabi were developed into shared coursework. Similar grassroots efforts led to the formation, for example, of the National Association of Child Care Workers in South Africa, who over the years took over much of the organisation and work of this (largely voluntary) corps of teachers and child care workers, and who established further connections with helpful professionals.

Practitioners work in a variety of settings, such as early care and education, community-based child and youth development programs, parent education and family support, school-based programs, community mental health, group homes, residential centers, rehabilitation programs, pediatric health care, and juvenile justice programs.

The scope of practice from the Council of Canadian Child and Youth Care Associations provides a helpful definition of the field:

"Child and youth care practitioners work with children, youth and families with complex needs. They can be found in a variety of settings such as group homes and residential treatment centres, hospitals and community mental health clinics, community-based outreach and school-based programs, parent education and family support programs, as well as in private practice and juvenile justice programs. Child and youth care workers specialize in the development and implementation of therapeutic programs and planned environments and the utilization of daily life events to facilitate change. At the core of all effective child and youth care practice is a focus on the therapeutic relationship; the application of theory and research about human growth and development to promote the optimal physical, psycho-social, spiritual, cognitive, and emotional development of young people towards a healthy and productive adulthood; and a focus on strengths and assets rather than pathology."

== Public recognition ==
The first week of May is International Child and Youth Care Week with the first Thursday being Thank a Youth Worker Day.

== Education ==
Education for Child and Youth Care Practitioners varies around the world. Some have formal education in Child and Youth Care while others may enter the field through another discipline or specialty.

Some countries, such as Canada, have opportunities to complete a four-year programme in a university or two to three-year programme in a college leading to an advanced diploma in child and youth care which includes coursework and field placement. Some individuals enter the child and youth care field with a college diploma or university degree in a related field, such as psychology, sociology, addictions, or social service worker training.

Some CYW or CYC's further their education specifically in child and youth care and hold bachelors, masters and doctoral degrees in child and youth care.

== Professional certification ==
Professional certification is available to Child and Youth Workers through the Child and Youth Care Certification Board.

Certification involves an assessment process and demonstration of high standards of care and commitment to ongoing professional development. Certification is awarded to candidates who successfully demonstrate their professional practice through:

- Minimum requirements of education, experience & training
- Passing score on a situational judgement exam
- Provision of colleague references & supervisor assessment
- Membership in a professional association
- Agreement to abide by ethical practice
- Completion of a written portfolio

== See also ==
- Youth work
