= Orphanage =

Residential institution devoted to the care of orphans

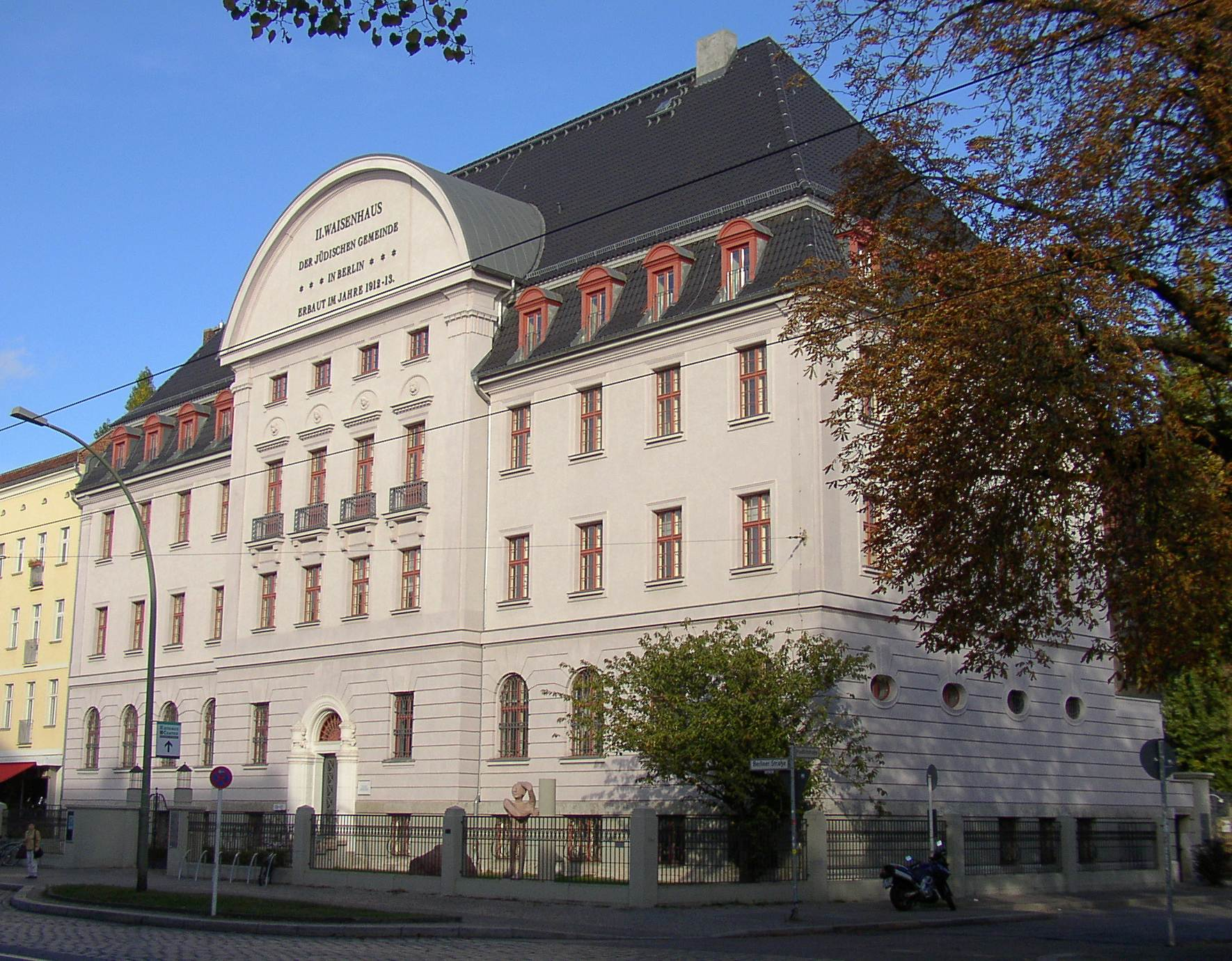
Former Jewish orphanage in Berlin-Pankow

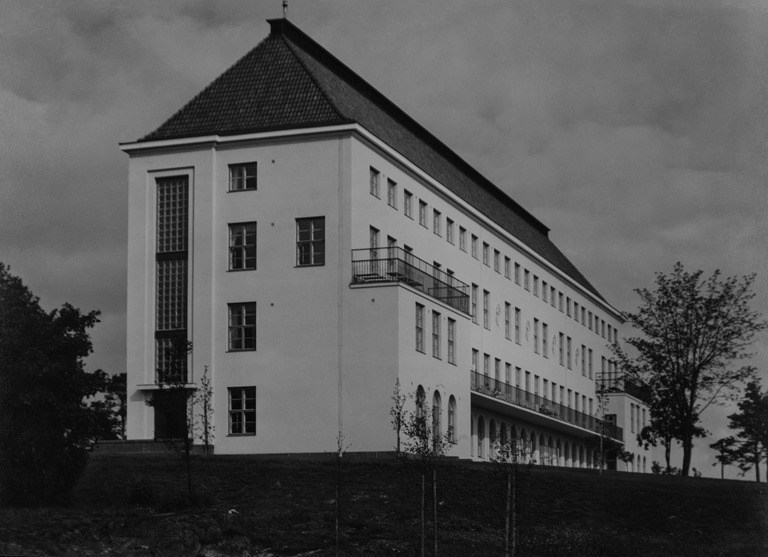
Sofianlehto Orphanage from 1930 in Helsinki, Finland

An orphanage is a residential institution, total institution or group home, devoted to the care of orphans and children who, for various reasons, cannot be cared for by their biological families. The parents may be deceased, absent, or abusive. There may be substance abuse or mental illness in the biological home, or the parent may simply be unwilling to care for the child. The legal responsibility for the support of abandoned children differs between, and within, countries. Government-run orphanages have been phased out in most developed countries during the latter half of the 20th century but continue to operate in many other regions internationally. It is now generally accepted that orphanages are detrimental to the emotional wellbeing of children, and government support goes instead towards supporting the family unit.

A few large international charities continue to fund orphanages, but most are still commonly founded by smaller charities and religious groups. Especially in developing countries, orphanages may prey on vulnerable families at risk of breakdown and actively recruit children to ensure continued funding. Orphanages in developing countries are rarely run by the state. However, not all orphanages that are state-run are less corrupted; the Romanian orphanages, like those in Bucharest, were founded due to the soaring population numbers catalyzed by dictator Nicolae Ceaușescu, who banned abortion and birth control and incentivized procreation in order to increase the Romanian workforce.

Today's residential institutions for children, also described as congregate care, include group homes, residential child care communities, children's homes, refuges, rehabilitation centers, night shelters, and youth treatment centers.

== History ==
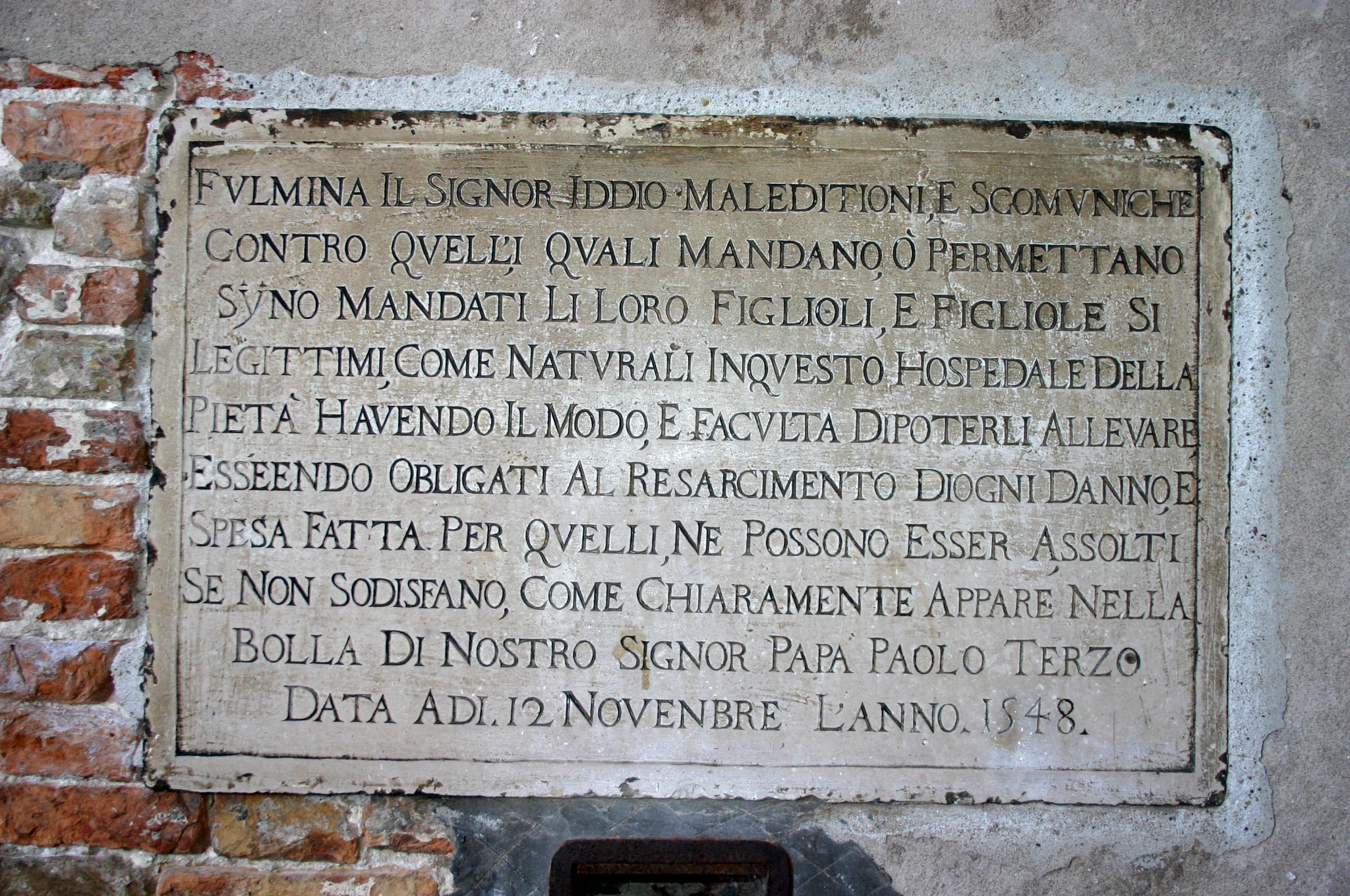
Plaque where once stood the ruota ("the wheel"), the place to abandon children at the side of the Chiesa della Pietà, the church of an orphanage in Venice. The plaque cites on a Papal bull by Paul III dated 12 November 1548, threatens "excommunication and maledictions" for all those who – having the means to rear a child – choose to abandon him/her instead. Such ex-communication may not be canceled until the culprit refunds all freights incurred to raise the baby.

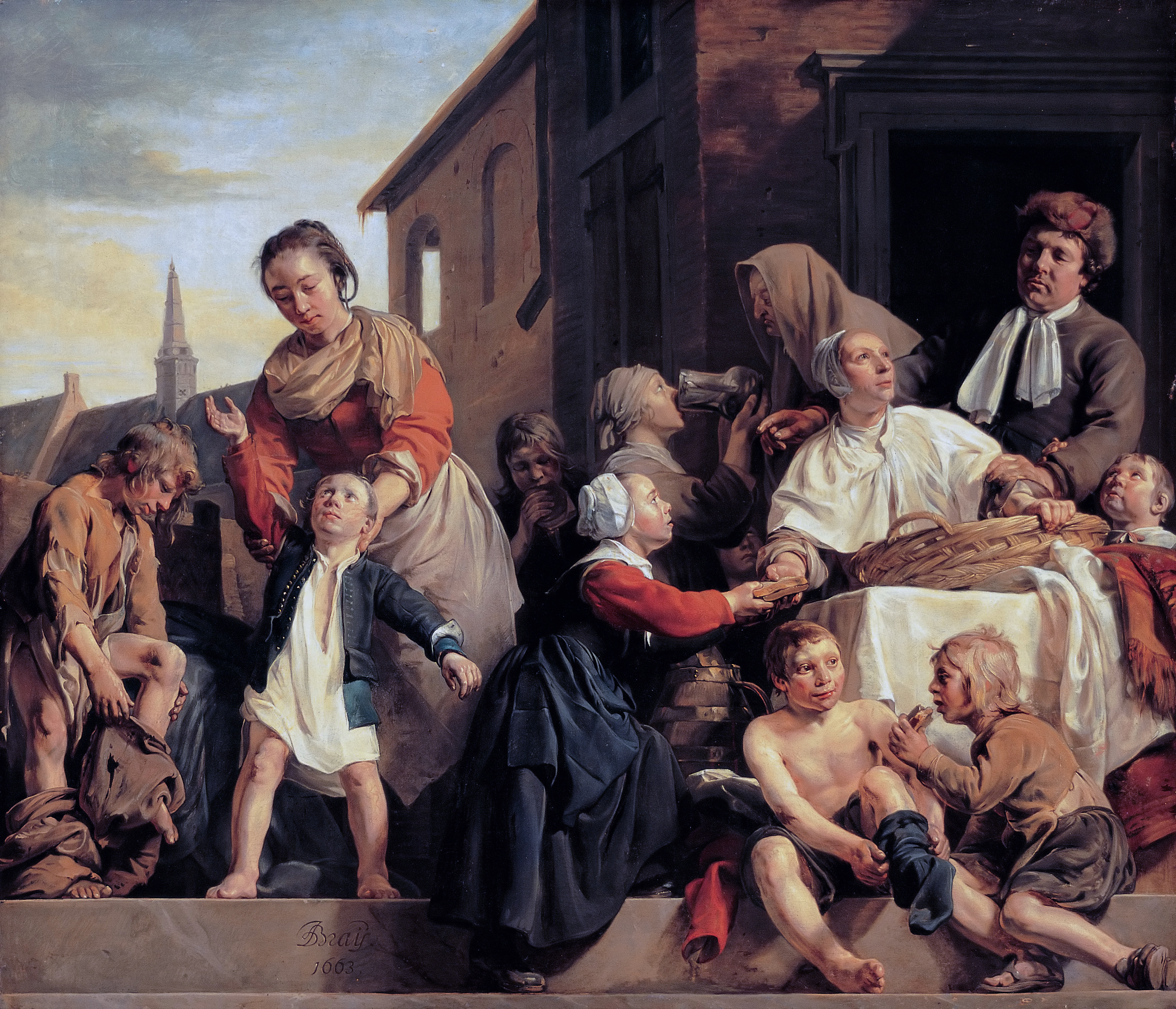
Caring for orphans, by Dutch artist Jan de Bray, 1663

The Romans formed their first orphanages around 400 AD. Jewish law prescribed care for the widow and the orphan, and Athenian law supported all orphans of those killed in military service until the age of eighteen. Similarly, Plato (Laws, 927) says: "Orphans should be placed under the care of public guardians. Men should have a fear of the loneliness of orphans and of the souls of their departed parents. A man should love the unfortunate orphan of whom he is guardian as if he were his own child. He should be as careful and as diligent in the management of the orphan's property as of his own or even more careful still." The care of orphans was referred to bishops and, during the Middle Ages, to monasteries. As soon as they were old enough, children were often given as apprentices to households to ensure their support and to learn an occupation.

In medieval Europe, care for orphans tended to reside with the Church. The Elizabethan Poor Laws were enacted at the time of the Reformation and placed public responsibility on individual parishes to care for the indigent poor.

=== Foundling Hospitals ===
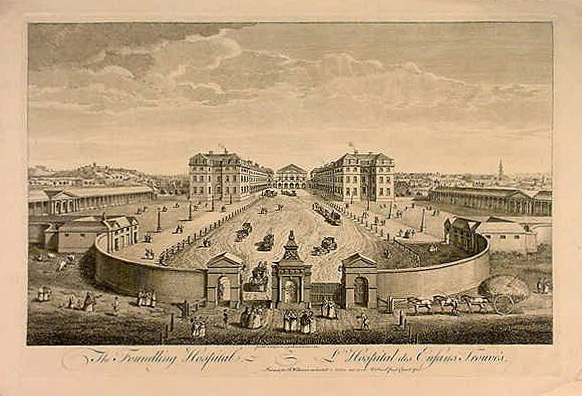
The Foundling Hospital. The building has been demolished.

The growth of sentimental philanthropy in the 18th century led to the establishment of the first charitable institutions that would cater to orphans. The Foundling Hospital was founded in 1741 by the philanthropic sea captain Thomas Coram in London, England, as a children's home for the "education and maintenance of exposed and deserted young children." The first children were admitted into a temporary house located in Hatton Garden. At first, no questions were asked about child or parent, but a distinguishing token was put on each child by the parent.

On reception, children were sent to wet nurses in the countryside, where they stayed until they were about four or five years old. At sixteen, girls were generally apprenticed as servants for four years; at fourteen, boys were apprenticed into a variety of occupations, typically for seven years. There was a small benevolent fund for adults.

In 1756, the House of Commons resolved that all children offered should be received, that local receiving places should be appointed all over the country, and that the funds should be publicly guaranteed. A basket was accordingly hung outside the hospital; the maximum age for admission was raised from two months to twelve, and a flood of children poured in from country workhouses. Parliament soon came to the conclusion that the indiscriminate admission should be discontinued. The hospital adopted a system of receiving children only with considerable sums. This practice was finally stopped in 1801, and it henceforth became a fundamental rule that no money was to be received.

=== Historical Development in the 18th and 19th century ===
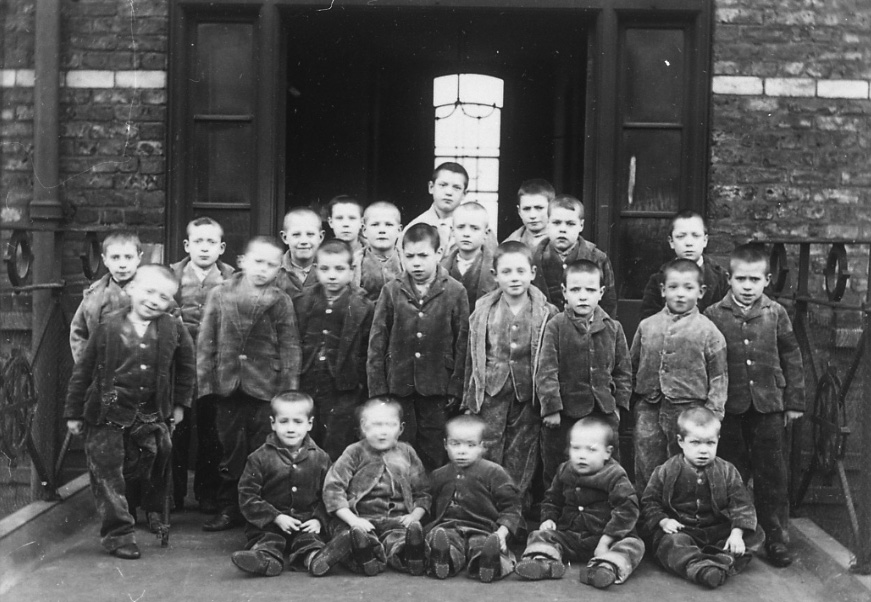
A group of orphans at Crumpsall Workhouse in the 19th century

==== United Kingdom ====
By the early nineteenth century, the problem of abandoned children in urban areas, especially London, began to reach alarming proportions. The workhouse system, instituted in 1834, although often brutal, was an attempt at the time to house orphans as well as other vulnerable people in society who could not support themselves in exchange for work. Conditions, especially for the women and children, were so bad as to cause an outcry among the social reform–minded middle-class; some of Charles Dickens' most famous novels, including Oliver Twist, highlighted the plight of the vulnerable and the often abusive conditions that were prevalent in the London orphanages.

Clamour for change led to the birth of the orphanage movement. In England, the movement really took off in the mid-19th century although orphanages such as the Orphan Working Home in 1758 and the Bristol Asylum for Poor Orphan Girls in 1795, had been set up earlier. Private orphanages were founded by private benefactors; these often received royal patronage and government oversight. Ragged schools, founded by John Pounds and the Lord Shaftesbury were also set up to provide pauper children with basic education.

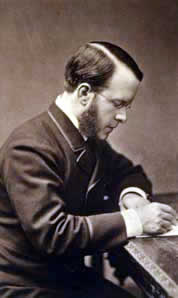
Thomas John Barnardo, the founder of the Barnardos Home for orphaned children.

A very influential philanthropist of the era was Thomas John Barnardo, the founder of the charity Barnardos. Becoming aware of the great numbers of homeless and destitute children adrift in the cities of England and encouraged by the 7th Earl of Shaftesbury and the 1st Earl Cairns, he opened the first of the "Dr. Barnardo's Homes" in 1870. By his death in 1905, he had established 112 district homes, which searched for and received waifs and strays, to feed, clothe and educate them. The system under which the institution was carried on is broad as follows: the infants and younger girls and boys were chiefly "boarded out" in rural districts; girls above fourteen years of age were sent to the industrial training homes, to be taught useful domestic occupations; boys above seventeen years of age were first tested in labor homes and then placed in employment at home, sent to sea, or emigrated; boys of between thirteen and seventeen years of age were trained for the various trades for which they might be mentally or physically fitted.

==== United States ====
In colonial and early America, orphanages that housed dependent children were rare but became increasingly popular between 1830 and 1860 following challenges associated with immigration, urban poverty, and public health crises like the cholera epidemic.

The earliest orphanages were private, religiously affiliated institutions that formed as a reaction to the harsh living conditions experienced by children in public poorhouses. In 1790, the Charleston Orphan House was institutionalized as the first public orphanage in the country. Other orphanages were also set up across the United States led by private or faith-based organizations that screen the eligibility of children to be taken under its custody based on religious denomination and ethnicity. For example, in 1806, the first private orphanage in New York, then the Orphan Asylum Society, now Graham Windham, was co-founded by Elizabeth Schuyler Hamilton, Alexander Hamilton's widow. In 1836, a group of Quaker women opened the first racially segregated orphanage, the Association for the Benefit of Colored Orphans (Colored Orphan Asylum).

In 1836, the New York Catholic Protectory was established catering to a broad class of Catholic children, and a few years later, in 1860, a group of German Jews opened the Hebrew Orphan Asylum. These early historical developments paved the way for the extensive and continuing participation of religious groups in child welfare services in the United States today. The Catholics began in1806 in Philadelphia. There were 75 Catholic orphanages nationwide in 1860 and over 250 in 1900.

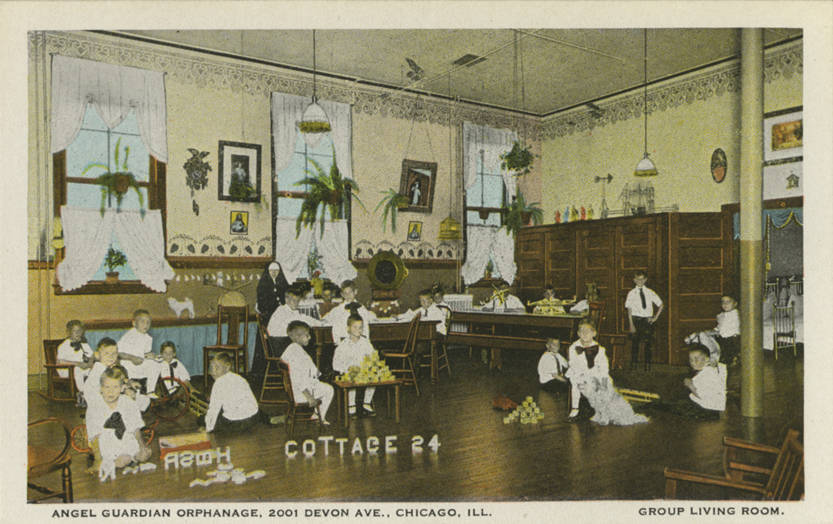
Angel Guardian Orphanage in Chicago (1922)

After the Civil War, state and local governments became even more involved in regulating and founding orphanages across the country. The primary drivers of this increased involvement was the need to provide for war orphans, the growing opposition to placing children in poorhouses, and the development of new child abuse laws and enforcement machinery. By 1910, more than 1,000 orphanages housed two-thirds of children outside their homes, which translates to roughly 3% of the national children's population based on figures from a 1910 census of minors under the age of fifteen. The remaining percentage were either placed in private homes or were beneficiaries of agreements similar to foster care. Over the next decades, however, placing out children to homes (later known as "foster care") instead of institutions was popularized by Charles Loring Bryce as an alternative to caring for children. Later, the Social Security Act of 1935 further improved conditions by authorizing Aid to Families with Dependent Children as a form of social security.

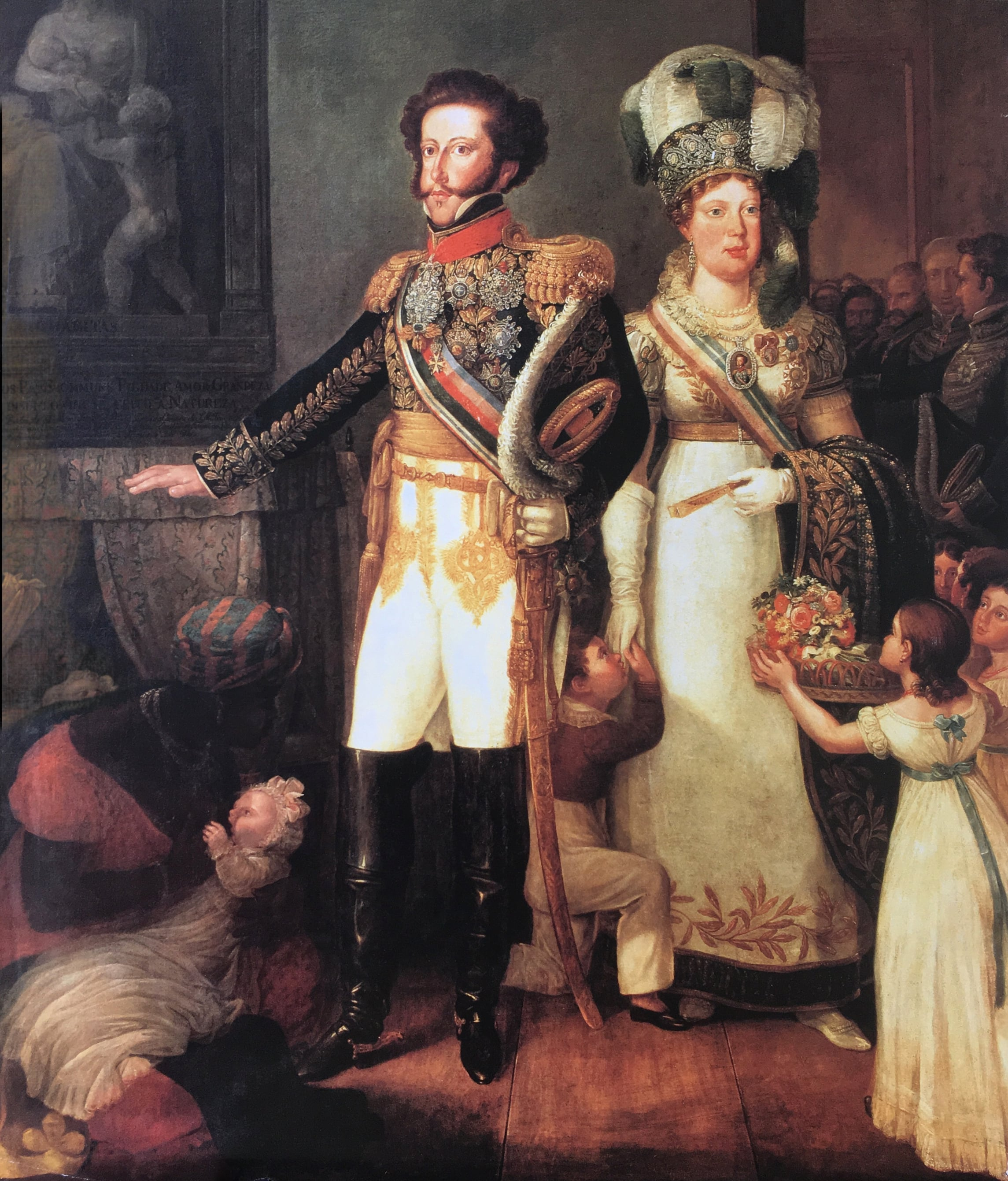
Emperor Pedro I of Brazil and his wife Maria Leopoldina visiting the Casa dos Expostos orphanage in Rio de Janeiro, 1826.

=== Deinstitutionalization ===
Evidence from a variety of studies supports the vital importance of attachment security and later development of children. Deinstitutionalization of orphanages and children's homes program in the United States began in the 1950s, after a series of scandals involving the coercion of birth parents and abuse of orphans (notably at Georgia Tann's Tennessee Children's Home Society). In Romania, a decree was established that aggressively promoted population growth, banning contraception and abortions for women with fewer than four children, despite the wretched poverty of most families. After Ceausescu was overthrown, he left a society unable and unwilling to take care of its children. Researchers conducted a study to see what the implications of this early childhood neglect were on development. Typically reared Romanian children showed high rates of secure attachment. Whereas the institutionally raised children showed huge rates of disorganized attachment. Many countries accepted the need to de-institutionalize the care of vulnerable children—that is, close down orphanages in favor of foster care and accelerated adoption.

Foster care operates by taking in children from their homes, due to the lack of care or abuse from their parents, where orphanages take in children with no parents or children whose parents have dropped them off for a better life, typically due to income. Major charities are increasingly focusing their efforts on the re-integration of orphans in order to keep them with their parents or extended family and communities. Orphanages are no longer common in the European Community, and Romania, in particular, has struggled greatly to reduce the visibility of its children's institutions to meet conditions of its entry into the European Union.

Some have stated it is important to understand the reasons for child abandonment, then set up targeted alternative services to support vulnerable families at risk of separation such as mother and baby units and day care centres.

== Comparison to alternatives ==
Research from the Bucharest Early Intervention Project (BEIP) is often cited as demonstrating that residential institutions negatively impact the wellbeing of children. The BEIP selected orphanages in Bucharest, Romania that raised abandoned children in socially and emotionally deprived environments in order to study the changes in development of infants and children after they had been placed with specially trained foster families in the local community. This study demonstrated how the loving attention typically provided to children by their parents or caregivers is pivotal for optimal human development, specifically of the brain; adequate nutrition is not enough. Further research of children who were adopted from institutions in Eastern European countries to the US demonstrated that for every 3.5 months that an infant spent in the institution, they lagged behind their peers in growth by 1 month. Further, a meta-analysis of research on the IQs of children in orphanages found lower IQs among the children in many institutions, but this result was not found in the low-income country setting. Worldwide, residential institutions like orphanages can often be detrimental to the psychological development of affected children. In countries where orphanages are no longer in use, the long-term care of unwarded children by the state has been transitioned to a domestic environment, with an emphasis on replicating a family home. Many of these countries, such as the United States, utilize a system of monetary stipends paid to foster parents to incentivize and subsidize the care of state wards in private homes. A distinction must be made between foster care and adoption, as adoption would remove the child from the care of the state and transfer the legal responsibility for that child's care to the adoptive parent completely and irrevocably, whereas, in the case of foster care, the child would remain a ward of the state with the foster parent acting only as a caregiver. Orphanages, especially larger ones, have had some well publicised examples of poor care. For example, in large institutions, children, but particularly babies, may not receive enough eye contact, physical contact, and stimulation to promote proper physical, social, or cognitive development. In the worst cases, orphanages can be dangerous and unregulated places where children are subject to abuse and neglect. Children living in orphanages for prolonged periods get behind in development goals, and have worse mental health. Orphanage children are not included in statistics making it easy to traffic them or abuse them in other ways. There are campaigns to include orphanage children and street children in progress statistics.

=== Foster care ===
The benefit of foster care over orphanages is disputed. One significant study carried out by Duke University concluded that institutional care in America in the 20th century produced the same health, emotional, intellectual, mental, and physical outcomes as care by relatives, and better than care in the homes of strangers. One explanation for this is the prevalence of permanent temporary foster care. This is the name for a long string of short stays with different foster care families. Permanent temporary foster care is highly disruptive to the child and prevents the child from developing a sense of security or belonging. Placement in the home of a relative maintains and usually improves the child's connection to family members. Experts and child advocates maintain that orphanages are expensive and often harm children's development by separating them from their families and that it would be more effective and cheaper to aid close relatives who want to take in the orphans.

=== Group homes ===
Another alternative is group homes which are used for short-term placements. They may be residential treatment centers, and they frequently specialize in a particular population with psychiatric or behavioral problems, e.g., a group home for children and teens with autism, eating disorders, or substance abuse problems or child soldiers undergoing decommissioning.

=== Kinship care ===
Most children who live in orphanages are not orphans; four out of five children in orphanages have at least one living parent and most having some extended family. Developing countries and their governments rely on kinship care to aid in the orphan crisis because it is cheaper to financially help extended families in taking in an orphaned child than it is to institutionalize them.

== Commercial orphanages ==
While many orphanages are run as not for profit institutions, some orphanages are run as for profit ventures. This has been criticized as incentivizing against the welfare of the orphans.

Most of the children living in institutions around the world have a surviving parent or close relative, and they most commonly entered orphanages because of poverty. It is speculated that flush with money, orphanages are increasing and push for children to join even though demographic data show that even the poorest extended families usually take in children whose parents have died. Visitors to developing countries can be taken in by orphanage scams, which can include orphanages set up as a front to get foreigners to pay school fees of orphanage directors' extended families. Alternatively the children whose upkeep is being funded by foreigners may be sent to work, not to school, the exact opposite of what the donor is expecting. Some orphanages even sell children. In Cambodia, from 2005 to 2017, the number of orphanages increased by 75%, with many of these orphanages renting children from poor families for $25/month. Families are promised that their children can get free education and food there, while in actuality they are used as props to garner donations. Some are also bought from their parents for very little and passed on to westerners who pay a large fee to adopt them. This also happens in China. In Nepal, orphanages can be used as a way to remove a child from their parents before placing them for adoption overseas, which is equally lucrative to the owners who receive a number of official and unofficial payments and "donations". In other countries, such as Indonesia, orphanages are run as businesses, which will attract donations and make the owners rich; often the conditions orphans are kept in will deliberately be poor to attract more donations.

== Worldwide ==
Developing nations are lacking in child welfare and their well-being because of a lack of resources. Research that is being collected in the developing world shows that these countries focus purely on survival indicators instead of a combination of their survival and other positive indicators like a developed nation would do.

=== Europe ===
The orphanages and institutions remaining in Europe tend to be in Eastern Europe and Northern Europe and are generally state-funded.

==== Albania ====
There are estimated to be about 31,000 orphans (0–14 years old) in Albanian orphanages (2012 statistics). In most cases they were abandoned by their parents. At 14 they are required, by law, to leave their orphanage and live on their own. There are approximately 10 small orphanages in Albania; each one having only 12-40 children residing there. The larger ones are state-run.

==== Bosnia and Herzegovina ====
SOS Children's Villages gives support to 240 orphaned children.

==== Bulgaria ====
The Bulgarian government has shown interest in strengthening children's rights.

In 2010, Bulgaria adopted a national strategic plan for the period 2010–2025 to improve the living standards of the country's children. Bulgaria is working hard to get all institutions closed within the next few years and find alternative ways to take care of the children.

"Support is sporadically given to poor families and work during daytime; correspondingly, different kinds of day centers have started up, though the quality of care in these centers is poorly measured and difficult to monitor. A smaller number of children have also been able to be relocated into foster families".

There are 7000 children living in Bulgarian orphanages wrongly classified as orphaned. Only 10 percent of these are orphans, with the rest of the children placed in orphanages for temporary periods when the family is in crisis.

==== Estonia ====
As of 2009, there are 35 different orphanages.

==== Hungary ====
A comprehensive national strategy for strengthening the rights of children was adopted by Parliament in 2007 and will run until 2032.

Child flow to orphanages has been stopped and children are now protected by social services. Violation of children's rights leads to litigation.

==== Lithuania ====
In Lithuania there are 105 institutions. 41 percent of the institutions each have more than 60 children. Lithuania has the highest number of orphaned children in Northern Europe.

==== Poland ====
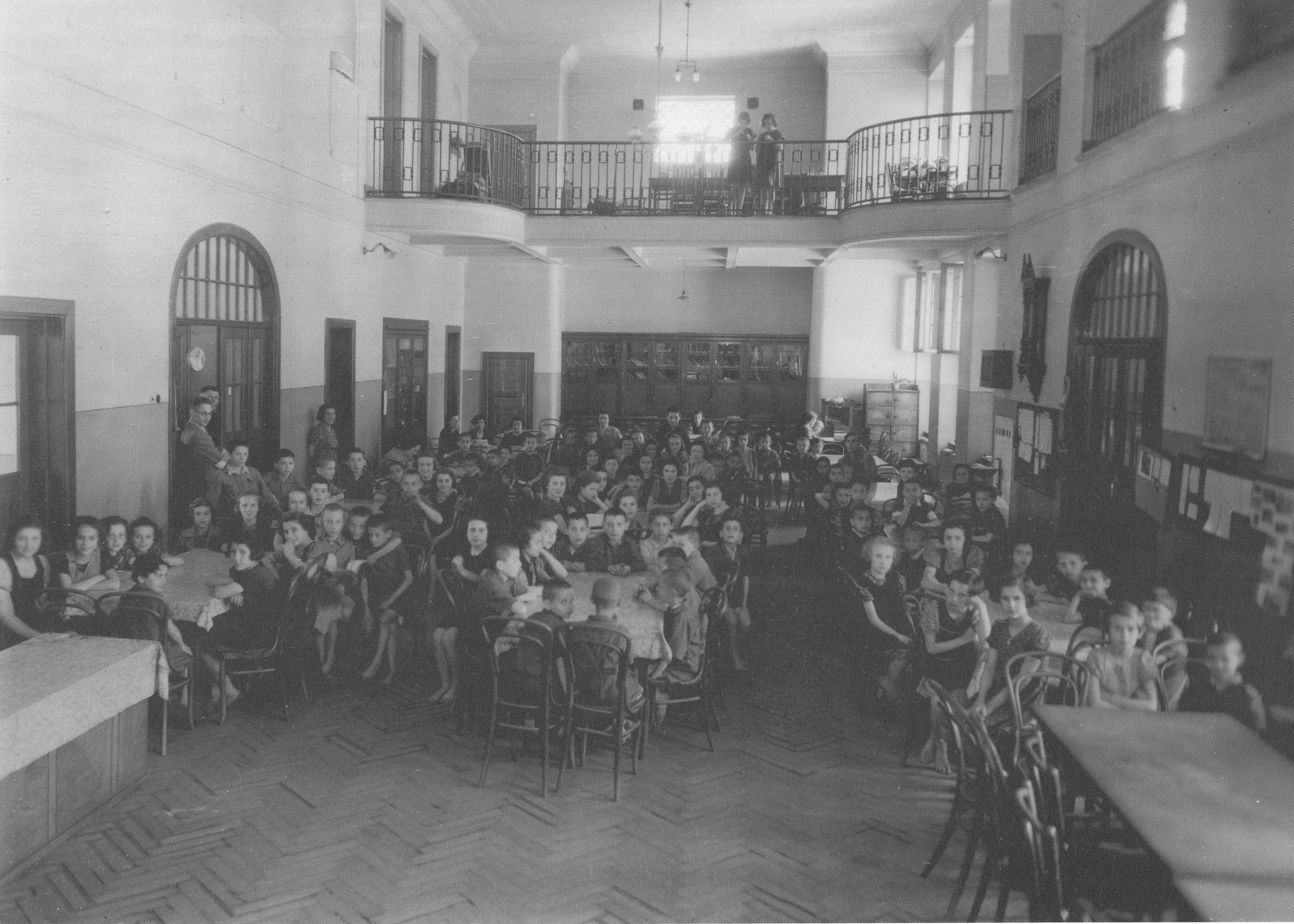
Orphanage in Warsaw (1940)

Children's rights enjoy relatively strong protection in Poland. Orphaned children are now protected by social services.

Social Workers' opportunities have increased by establishing more foster homes and aggressive family members can now be forced away from home, instead of replacing the child/children.

==== Moldova ====
More than 8800 children are being raised in state institutions, but only three percent of them are orphans.

==== Romania ====
The Romanian child welfare system is in the process of being revised and has reduced the flow of infants into orphanages.

According to Baroness Emma Nicholson, in some counties Romania now has "a completely new, world class, state of the art, child health development policy." Dickensian orphanages remain in Romania, but Romania seeks to replace institutions by family care services, as children in need will be protected by social services. As of 2018, there were 17,718 children in old-style residential centers, a significant decrease from about 100,000 in 1990.

==== Serbia ====
There are many state orphanages "where several thousand children are kept and which are still part of an outdated child care system". The conditions for them are bad because the government does not pay enough attention in improving the living standards for disabled children in Serbia's orphanages and medical institutions.

==== Slovakia ====
The committee made recommendations, such as proposals for the adoption of a new "national 14" action plan for children for at least the next five years, and the creation of an independent institution for the protection of child rights.

==== Sweden ====
One of the first orphanages in Sweden was the Stora Barnhuset (1633-1922) in Stockholm, which remained the biggest orphanage in Sweden for centuries. In 1785, however, a reform by Gustav III of Sweden stipulated that orphans should first and foremost always be placed in foster homes when that was possible.

In Sweden, there are 5,000 children in the care of the state. None of them are currently living in an orphanage, because there is a social service law which requires that the children reside in a family home.

==== United Kingdom ====
During the Victorian era, child abandonment was rampant, and orphanages were set up to reduce infant mortality. Such places were often so full of children that nurses often administered Godfrey's Cordial, a special concoction of opium and treacle, to soothe baby colic.

Orphaned children were placed in either prisons or the poorhouse/workhouse, as there were so few places in orphanages, or else they were left to fend for themselves on the street. Such openings in orphanages as were available could only be obtained by collecting votes for admission, placing them out of reach of poor families.

Known orphanages are:

Founded in	Name	Location	Founder
1741	Foundling Hospital	London	Thomas Coram
1795	Bristol Asylum for Poor Orphan Girls (Blue Maids' Orphanage)	nr Stokes Croft turnpike, Bristol	
1800	St Elizabeth's Orphanage of Mercy	Eastcombe, Glos	
1813	London Asylum for Orphans London Orphan Asylum	Hackney, London Watford 1871 Cobham 1945	Rev Andrew Reed
1822	Female Orphan Asylum	Brighton	Francois de Rosaz
1827	Infant Orphan Asylum Royal Infant Orphanage Royal Wanstead School Royal Wanstead Children's Foundation	Wanstead	Rev Andrew Reed
1829	Sailor Orphan Girls School	London	
1831	Jews' Orphan Asylum Norwood Jewish Orphanage 1928 Norwood Home for Jewish Children 1956	Goodman's Fields, Whitechapel, London 1831 West Norwood 1866	
1836	Ashley Down orphanage	Bristol	George Müller
1844	Asylum for Fatherless Children Reedham Orphanage	Richmond Stoke Newington Stamford Hill Purley 1846	Rev Andrew Reed
1854	Wolverhampton Orphan Asylum	Goldthorn Hill, Wolverhampton	John Lees
1856	Wiltshire Reformatory	Warminster	
1857	St. Mary's Orphanage for Boys	Blackheath, London	Rev. William Gowan Todd, D.D.
1860	Major Street Ragged Schools	Liverpool	Canon Thomas Major Lester
1861	St. Philip Neri's orphanage for boys	Birmingham	Oratorians
1861	Adult Orphan Institution	St Andrew's Place, Regent's Park, London	
1861	British Orphan Asylum	Clapham, London	
1861	Female Orphan Asylum	Westminster Road, London	
1861	Female Orphan Home	Charlotte Row, St Peter Walworth, London	
1861	Merchant Seamen's Orphan Asylum	Bromley St Leonard, Bow, London	
1861	Orphan Working School	Haverstock Hill, Kentish Town, London	
1861	Orphanage	Eagle House, Hammersmith, London	
1861	The Orphanage Asylum	Christchurch, Marylebone, London's	
1861	The Sailors' Orphan Girls' School & Home	Hampstead, London	
1861	Sunderland Orphan Asylum	Sunderland	
1862	Swansea Orphan Home for Girls	Swansea	
1863	British Seaman's Orphan Boys' Home	Brixham	William Gibbs
1865	The Boys' Home Regent's Park	London	
1866	Dr. Barnardo's	various	Dr. Barnardo
1866	National Industrial Home for Crippled Boys	London	
1867	Peckham Home for Little Girls	London	Maria Rye
1868	The Boys' Refuge	Bisley	
1868	Royal Albert Orphanage	Worcester	
1868	Worcester Orphan Asylum	Worcester	
1868	St Francis' Boy's Home	Shefford, Bedfordshire	
1869	Ely Deaconesses Orphanage	Bedford	Rev Thomas Bowman Stephenson
1869	Orphanage and Almshouses	Erdington	Josiah Mason
1869	The Neglected Children of Exeter	Exeter	
1869	Alexandra Orphanage for Infants	Hornsey Rise, London	
1869	Stockwell Orphanage	London	Charles Spurgeon
1869	New Orphan Asylum	Upper Henwick, Worcs	
1869	Wesleyan Methodist National Children's Homes National Children's Homes NCH Action for Children Action for Children	various	Rev Thomas Bowman Stephenson
1870	Fegans Homes	London	James William Condell Fegan
1870	Manchester and Salford Boys' and Girls' Refuge	Manchester	
1870	18 Stepney Causeway The William Baker Memorial Technical School for Boys 1922	London Goldings estate, Hertford 1922	Dr. Barnardo
1871	Wigmore	West Bromwich and Walsall	WJ Gilpin
1872	Middlemore Home	Edgbaston	Dr. John T. Middlemore
1872	St Theresa Roman Catholic Orphanage for Girls	Plymouth	Sisters of Charity
1873	The Orphan Homes	Ryelands Road, Leominster	Henry S. Newman
1874	Cottage Homes for Children	West Derby	Mrs. Nassau Senior
1875	Aberlour Orphanage	Aberlour, Scotland	Rev Charles Jupp
1877	All Saints Boys' Orphanage	Lewisham, London	
1880	Birmingham Working Boy's Home (for boys over the age of 13)	Birmingham	Major Alfred V. Fordyce
1881	The Waifs and Strays' Society Church of England Incorporated Society for Providing Homes for Waifs and Strays 1893 Church of England Children's Society 1946 The Children's Society 1982	East Dulwich, London	Edward de Montjoie Rudolf
1881	Catholic Children's Protection Society	Liverpool	James Nugent & Bishop Bernard O'Reilly
1881	Dorset County Boys Home	Milborne St Andrew	
1881	Brixton Orphanage	Brixton Road, Lambeth, London	
1881	Orphanage Infirmary	West Square, London Road, Southwark, London	
1881	Orphans' Home	South Street. London Road, Southwark, London	
1882	St Michael's Home for Friendless Girls	Salisbury	
1890	St Saviour's Home	Shrewsbury	
1890	Orphanage of Pity	Warminster	
1890	Wolverhampton Union Cottage homes	Wolverhampton	
1892	Calthorpe Home For Girls	Handsworth, Birmingham	The Waifs and Strays' Society
1899	Northern Police Orphanage St George's House, Harrogate	Harrogate	Catherine Gurney
1899	Inglewood Children's Home	Otley, Leeds	
1918	Painswick Orphanage	Painswick	
unknown	Clio Boys' Home	Liverpool	
unknown	St Philip's Orphanage, (RC Institution for Poor Orphan Children)	Brompton, Kensington	

=== Sub-Saharan Africa ===
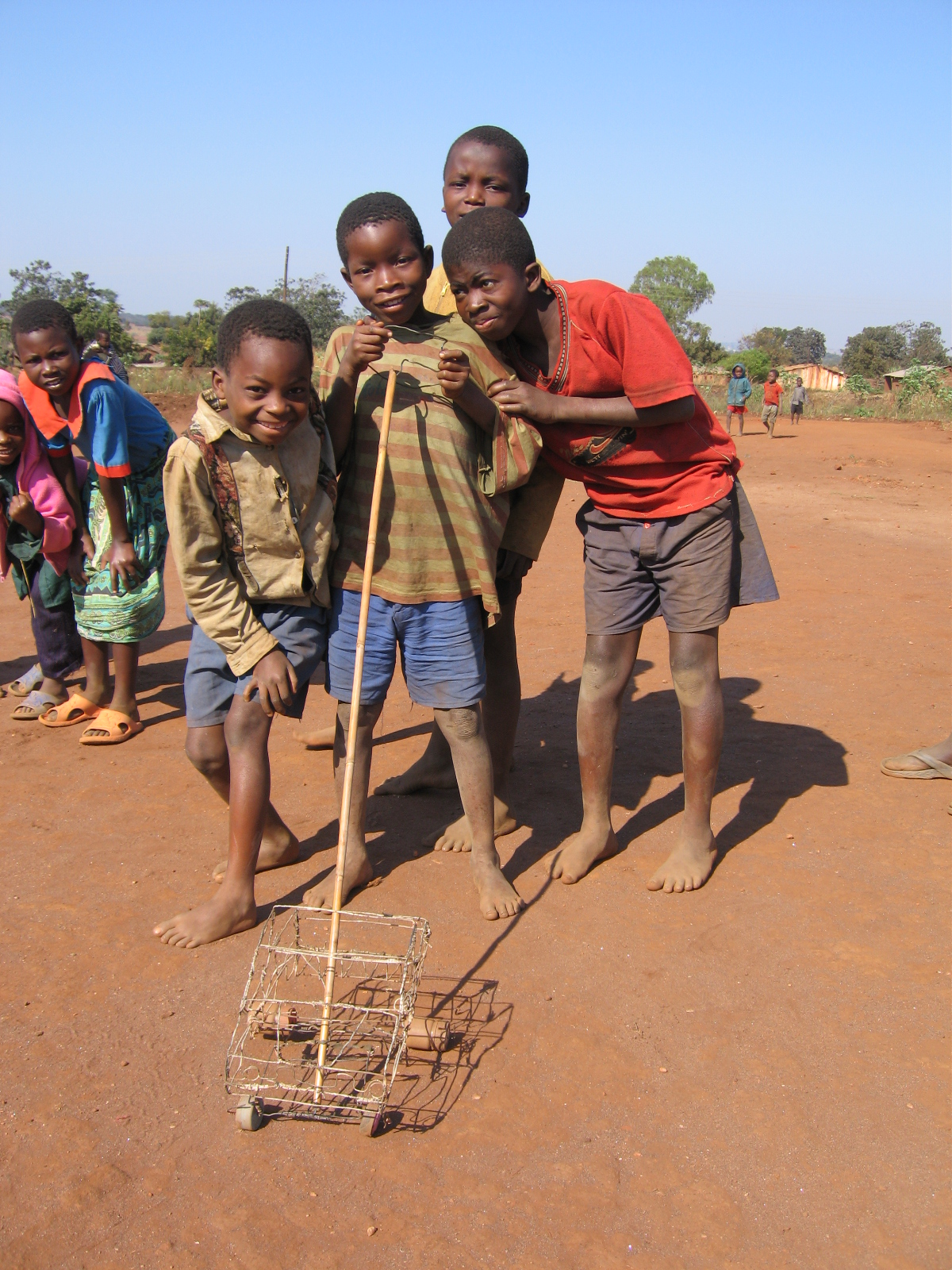
AIDS orphans in Malawi

==== Ethiopia ====
"For example, in the Jerusalem Association Children's Home (JACH), only 160 children remain of the 785 who were in JACH's three orphanages." / "Attitudes regarding the institutional care of children have shifted dramatically in recent years in Ethiopia. There appears to be a general recognition by MOLSA and the NGOs with which Pact is working that such care is, at best, a last resort and that serious problems arise with the social reintegration of children who grow up in institutions, and deinstitutionalization through family reunification and independent living are being emphasized."

==== Ghana ====
A 2007 survey sponsored by Africa (previously Orphan Aid Africa) and carried out by the Department of Social Welfare came up with the figure of 4,800 children in institutional care in 148 orphanages. The government is currently attempting to phase out the use of orphanages in favor of foster care placements and adoption. At least eighty-eight homes have been closed since the passage of the National Plan of Action for Orphans and Vulnerable Children. The website www.ovcghana.org details these reforms.

==== Kenya ====
A 1999 survey of 36,000 orphans found the following number in institutional care: 64 in registered institutions and 164 in unregistered institutions.

==== Malawi ====
There are about 101 orphanages in Malawi. There is a UNICEF/Government driven program on de-institutionalization, but few orphanages are yet involved in the program.

==== Rwanda ====
Out of 400,000 orphans, 5,000 are living in orphanages. The Government of Rwanda are working with Hope and Homes for Children to close the first institution and develop a model for community-based childcare which can be used across the country and ultimately Africa

==== Tanzania ====
"Currently, there are 52 orphanages in Tanzania caring for about 3,000 orphans and vulnerable children." A world bank document on Tanzania showed it was six times more expensive to institutionalize a child there than to help the family become functional and support the child themselves.

==== Nigeria ====
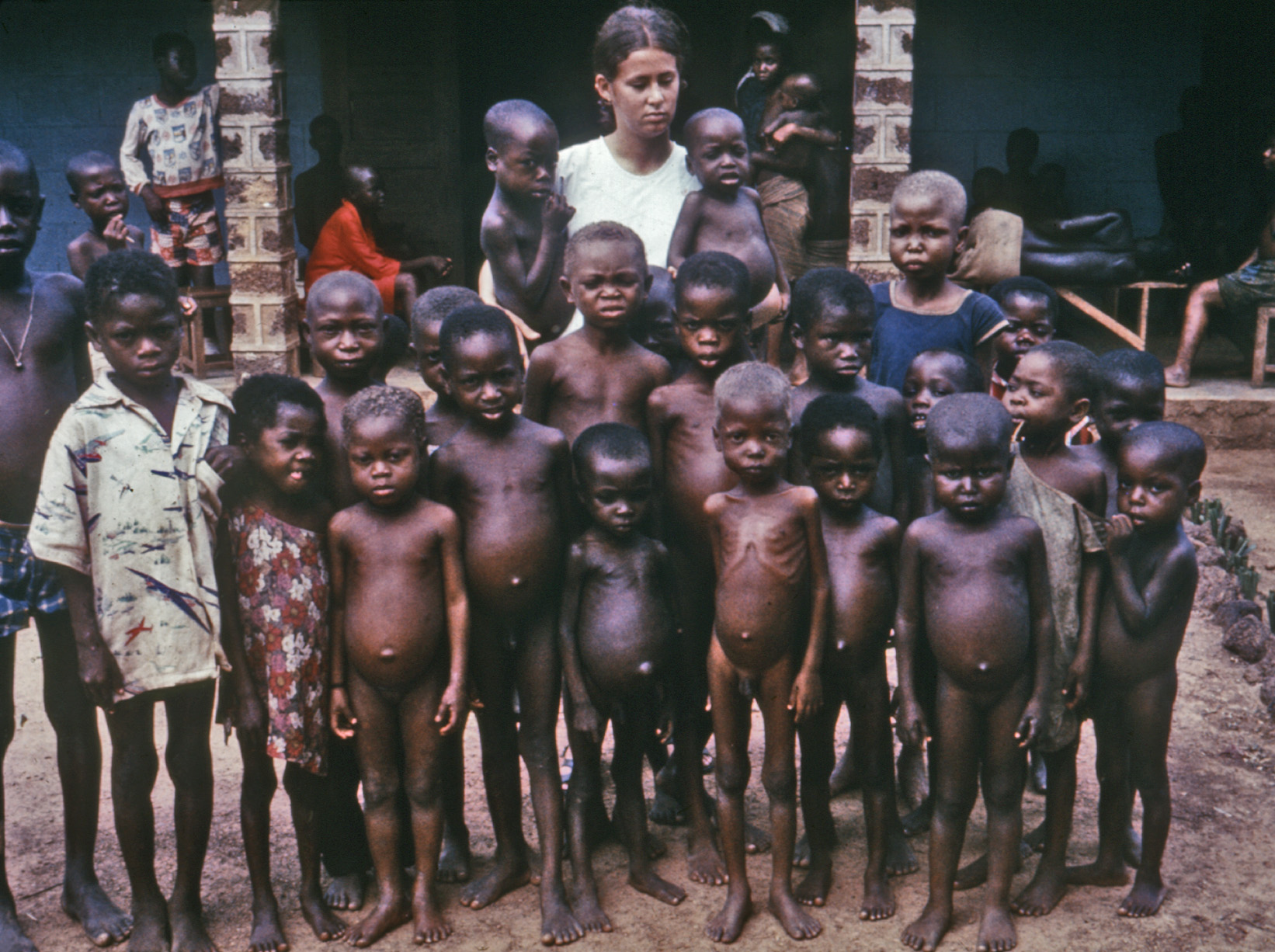
Nigerian orphanage in the late 1960s

In Nigeria, a rapid assessment of orphans and vulnerable children (conducted in 2004, with UNICEF support) revealed that there were about seven million orphans in 2003, and that 800,000 more orphans were added during that same year. Out of this total number, about 1.8 million are orphaned by HIV/AIDS. With the spread of HIV/AIDS, the number of orphans is expected to increase rapidly in the coming years to 8.2 million by 2010.

==== South Africa ====
Since 2000, South Africa no longer licenses orphanages. Nonetheless, they continue to be set-up unregulated, potentially doing more harm. Theoretically, the policy supports community-based family homes but this is not always the case. One example is the homes operated by Thokomala.

==== Zimbabwe ====
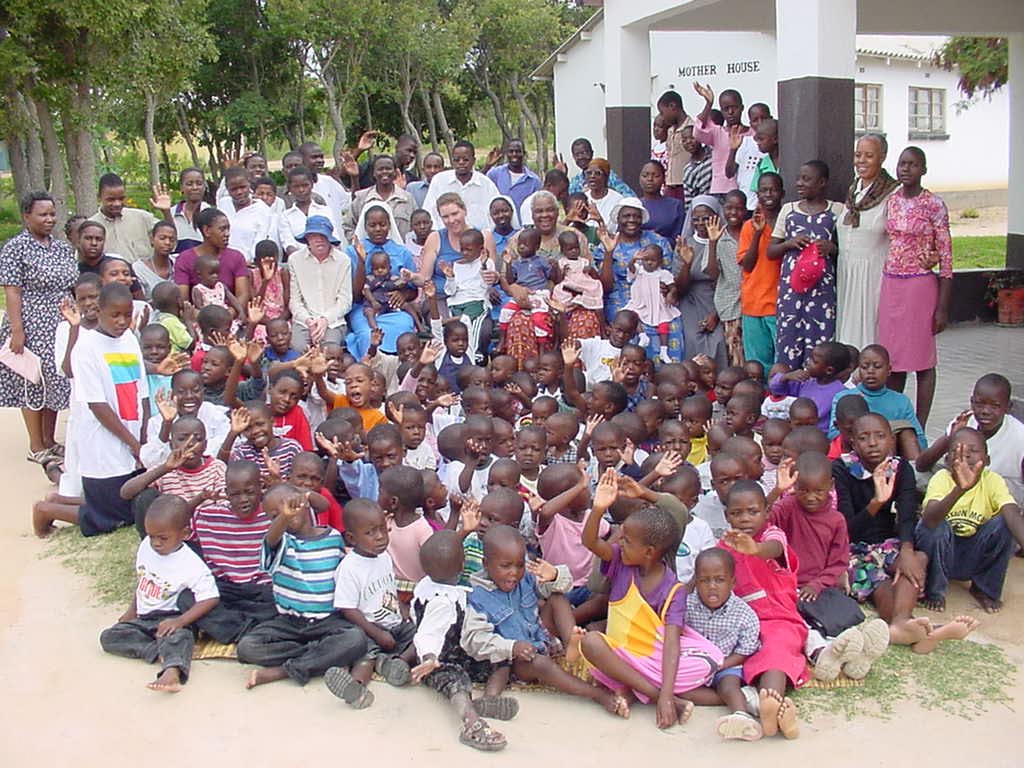
Mother of Peace AIDS orphanage, Zimbabwe, 2005

There are 39 privately run children's charity homes, or orphanages, in the country, and the government operates eight of its own. Privately run Orphanages can accommodate an average of 2000 children, though some are very small and located in very remote areas, hence can take in less than 150 children. Statistics on the total number of children in orphanages nationwide are unavailable, but caregivers say their facilities were becoming unmanageably overwhelmed almost on a daily basis. Between 1994 and 1998, the number of orphans in Zimbabwe more than doubled from 200,000 to 543,000, and in five years, the number is expected to reach 900,000. (Unfortunately, there is no room for these children.)

==== Togo ====
In Togo, there were an estimated 280,000 orphans under 18 years of age in 2005, 88,000 of them orphaned by AIDS. Ninety-six thousand orphans in Togo attend school.

==== Sierra Leone ====
- Children (0–17 years) orphaned by AIDS, 2005, estimate 31,000
- Children (0–17 years) orphaned due to all causes, 2005, estimate 340,000
- Orphan school attendance ratio, 1999–2005 71,000

==== Senegal ====
- Children (0–17 years) orphaned by AIDS, 2005, estimate 25,000
- Children (0–17 years) orphaned due to all causes, 2005, estimate 560,000
- Orphan school attendance ratio, 1999–2005 74,000

=== South Asia ===
==== Nepal ====
There are at least 602 child care homes housing 15,095 children in Nepal "Orphanages have turned into a Nepalese industry there is rampant abuse and a great need for intervention." Many do not require adequate checks of their volunteers, leaving children open to abuse.

==== Afghanistan ====
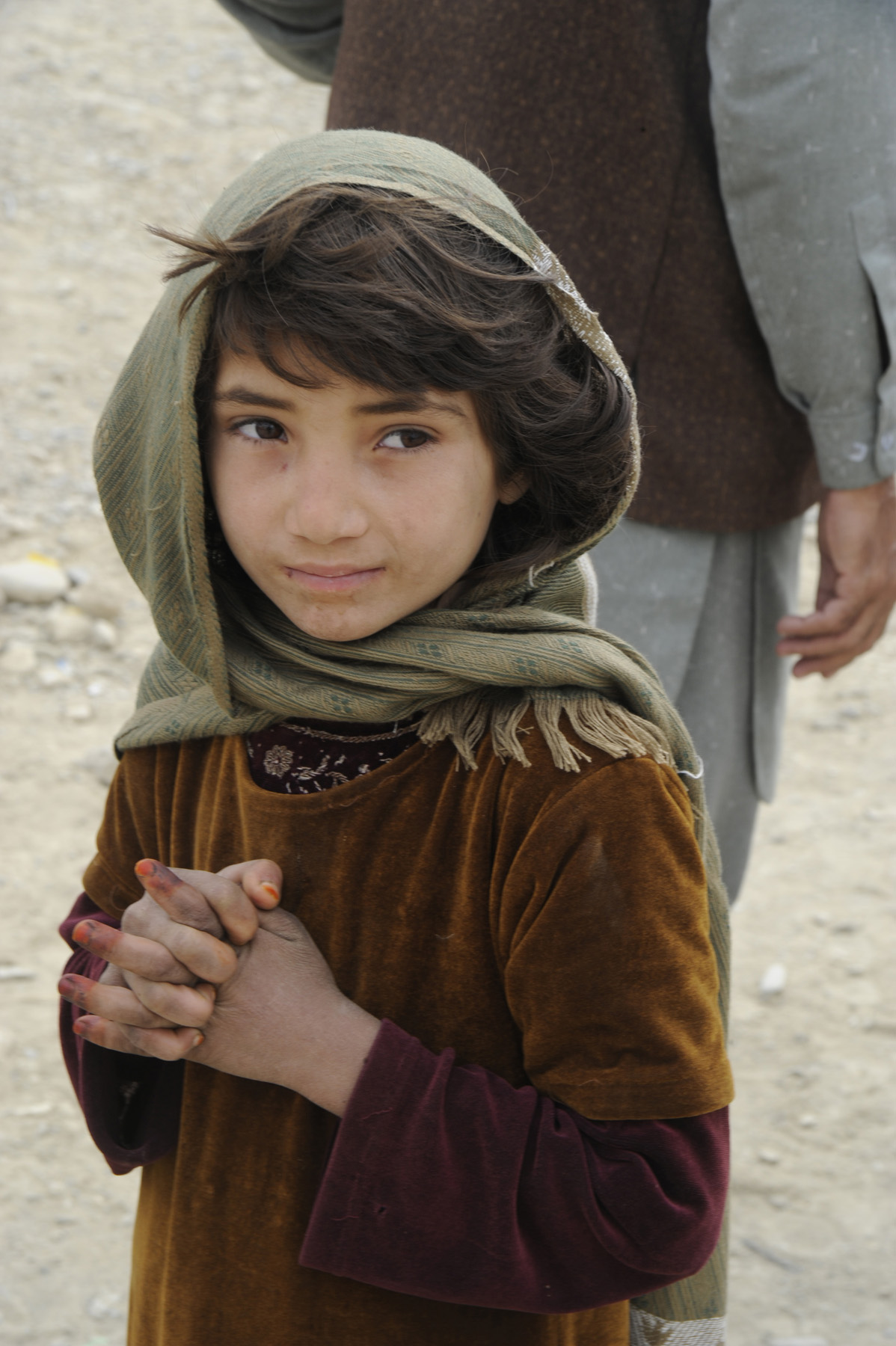
PRT donates clothing, blankets to Khowst orphanage in Afghanistan

"At Kabul's two main orphanages, Alauddin and Tahia Maskan, the number of children enrolled has increased almost 80 percent since last January, from 700 to over 1,200 children. Almost half of these come from families who have at least one parent, but who can't support their children." The non-governmental organisation Mahboba's promise assists orphans in contemporary Afghanistan. Nowadays the number of orphanages had changed. There are approximately 19 orphanages only in Kabul.

==== Bangladesh ====
"There are no statistics regarding the actual number of children in welfare institutions in Bangladesh. The Department of Social Services, under the Ministry of Social Welfare, has a major program named Child Welfare and Child Development in order to provide access to food, shelter, basic education, health services and other basic opportunities for hapless children." (The following numbers mention capacity only, not actual numbers of orphans at present.)

9,500 – State institutions 250 – babies in three available "baby homes" 400 – Destitute Children's Rehabilitation Centre 100 – Vocational Training Centre for Orphans and Destitute Children 1,400 -Sixty-five Welfare and Rehabilitation Programmes for Children with Disability

The private welfare institutions are mostly known as orphanages and madrassahs. The authorities of most of these orphanages put more emphasis on religion and religious studies. One example follows: 400 – Approximately – Nawab Sir Salimullah Muslim Orphanage.

==== Maldives ====
The 2010 estimate for the number of children (0–17 years) orphaned due to all causes is 51.

==== India ====
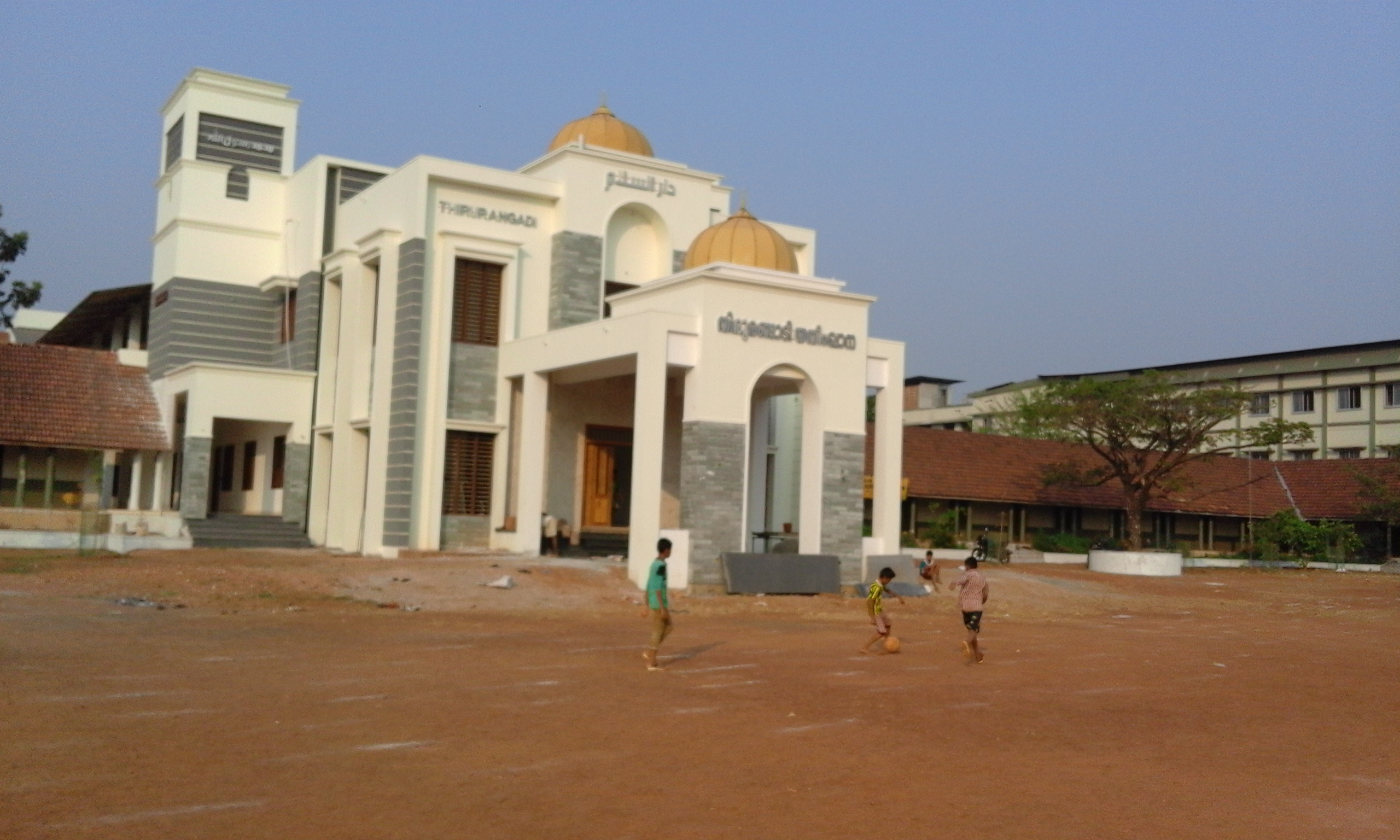
Tirurangadi Orphanage, India.

India is in the top 10 and also has a very large number of orphans as well as a destitute child population. Orphanages operated by the state are generally known as juvenile homes. In addition, there is a vast number of privately run orphanages running into thousands spread across the country. These are run by various trusts, religious groups, individual citizens, citizens groups, NGO's, etc.

While some of these places endeavor to place the children for adoption a vast majority just care and educate them till they are of legal majority age and help place them back on their feet. Prominent organizations in this field include BOYS TOWN, SOS children's villages, etc.

There have been scandals especially with regard to adoption. Since government rules restrict funds unless there are a certain number of residents, some orphanages make sure the resident numbers remain high at the cost of adoption.

==== Pakistan ====
According to a UNICEF report in 2016, there are around 4.2 million orphaned children in Pakistan. Pakistan has had sizable economic growth from 1950 to 1999 yet they aren't performing well in multiple social indicators like education and health, and this is mainly due to the corrupt and unstable government. Pakistan heavily relies on the nonprofit sector and zakat to finance social issues such as aid for orphans. Zakat is a financial obligation on Muslims which requires one to donate 2.5% of the family's income to charity, and it is specifically mentioned in the Quran to take care of orphans. With the new use of zakat money from donations to investments it has a lot of potential in benefiting the development as well as the ultimate goal of poverty alleviation. The Pakistan government relies on this public sector on taking care of local issues so that they do not have the burden. Furthermore, only 6 percent of cash revenues are contributed to non-profits in Pakistan, and they are heavily favored by the government because it saves them money as non-profits are taking care of issues such as orphan care.

=== East and Southeast Asia ===
==== Taiwan ====
The number of orphanages and orphans drastically dropped from 15 institutions and 2,216 persons in 1971 to 9 institutions and 638 persons by the end of 2001.

==== Thailand ====
There are still a substantial number of NGOs and informal orphanages in Thailand, particularly in Northern Thailand near the borders of Laos and Myanmar, (for instance around Chiang Rai). Very few of the children in these establishments are orphans, most have living parents. They attract funding from well-meaning tourists. Often protecting the children from trafficking/abuse is cited but the names and photographs of the children are published in marketing material to attract more funding. The reality is that the safest environment for these children is almost always with their parents or in their villages with familial connections where strangers are rarely seen and immediately recognized. A very few of these orphanages, go so far as to abduct or forcibly remove children from their homes, often across the border in Myanmar. The parents in local hill tribes may be encouraged to "buy a place" in the orphanage for vast sums, being told their child will have a better future. Some children's homes claim to always try to repatriate children with their families, but the local managers & director of the homes know of no such procedures or processes.

==== Vietnam ====
There are approximately 2 million highly vulnerable children in Vietnam with an estimated 500,000 orphaned or abandoned children. There are a number of orphanages present in the country including the Vinh Son Montagnard Orphanage, however these are generally privately funded. There are very few government run institutions.

==== South Korea ====
According to the Los Angeles Times, "There are now 17,000 children in public orphanages throughout the country and untold numbers at private institutions."

==== Japan ====
Approximately 39,000 children live in orphanages in Japan out of the 45,000 (2018 statistics) who are not able to live with their birth parents.

However, as of 2016, Japanese orphanages are severely underfunded, relying heavily on volunteer work. There are 602 foster homes across Japan, each with 30 to 100 children. A large portion of children in these orphanages are not actually orphans but victims of domestic abuse or neglect.

==== Cambodia ====
As of 2010, 11,945 children lived in 269 residential care facilities in Cambodia. About 44% were placed there by a parent. It is estimated that there are 553,000 orphans in the country, but most of these children are cared for by their extended family or community.

==== China ====
There are currently over 600,000 abandoned orphans living in China (some would put the figure as high as 1 million). Of these, 98% have special needs. The 1996 Lijiang earthquake prompted the foundation of the Lijiang Ethnic Orphan School for orphaned earthquake victims.

==== Laos ====
"It is stated that there are 20,000 orphaned children in Laos." However the figure generally remains unknown as about 30% of children are never registered with the government and remain invisible. In Laos nearly 50 per cent of the population lives below the poverty line and many children are involved in child labor. There are six orphanages that are run by SOS Children's Village that help with this problem.

=== Middle East and North Africa ===
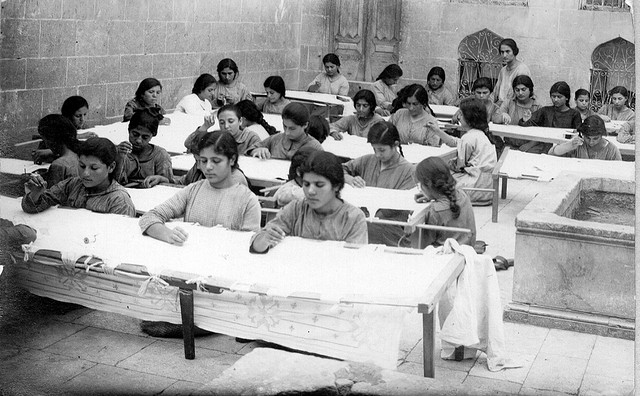
Orphan girls at the Aleppo Armenian orphanage, 1923

==== Egypt ====
"The [Mosques of Charity] orphanage houses about 120 children in Giza, Menoufiya and Qalyubiya." "We [Dar Al-Iwaa] provide free education and accommodation for over 200 girls and boys." "Dar Al-Mu'assassa Al-Iwaa'iya (Shelter Association), a government association affiliated with the Ministry of Social Affairs, was established in 1992. It houses about 44 children." There are also 192 children at The Awlady, 30 at Sayeda Zeinab orphanage, and 300 at My Children Orphanage.

Note: There are about 185 orphanages in Egypt. The above information was taken from the following articles: "Other families" by Amany Abdel-Moneim. Al-Ahram Weekly (5/1999). "Ramadan brings a charity to Egypt's orphans". Shanghai Star (13 December 2001). "A Child by Any Other Name" by Réhab El-Bakry. Egypt Today (11/2001).

==== Sudan ====
There is still at least one orphanage in Sudan although the conditions there have been reported as very poor.

==== South Sudan ====
The number of orphans is expected to be 5,000 in 2023 in South Sudan. And in 2018, the UN Children Fund (UNICEF) reported that about 15,000 children in South Sudan had become separated from their families or were missing due to conflict.

==== Bahrain ====
The "Royal Charity Organization" is a Bahraini governmental charity organization founded in 2001 by King Hamad ibn Isa Al Khalifah to sponsor all helpless Bahraini orphans and widows. Since then almost 7,000 Bahraini families are granted monthly payments, annual school bags, and a number of university scholarships. Graduation ceremonies, various social and educational activities, and occasional contests are held each year by the organization for the benefit of orphans and widows sponsored by the organization.

==== Iraq ====
UNICEF maintains the same number at present. "While the number of state homes for orphans in the whole of Iraq was 25 in 1990 (serving 1,190 children); both the number of homes and the number of beneficiaries has declined. The quality of services has also declined."

A 1999 study by UNICEF "recommended the rebuilding of national capacity for the rehabilitation of orphans." The new project "will benefit all the 1,190 children placed in orphanages."

==== Israel ====
"In 1999, the number of children living in orphanages witnessed a considerable drop as compared to 1998. The number dropped from 1,980 to 1,714 orphans. This is due to the policy of child re-integration in their household adopted by the Ministry of Social Affairs."

=== Former Soviet Union ===
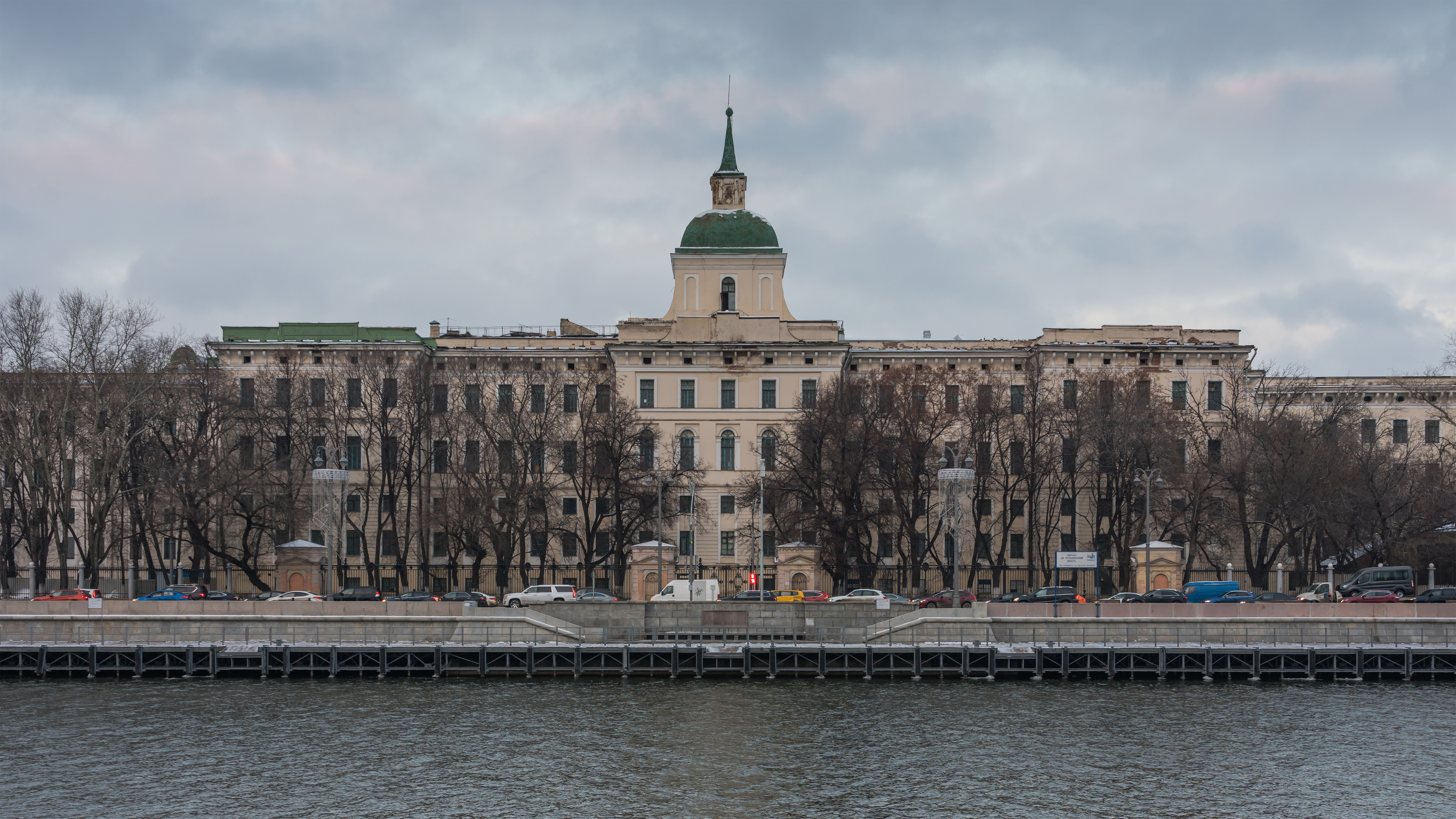
The Moscow Orphanage (founded in 1763, constructed in the 1770s)

In the post-Soviet countries, orphanages are better known as "children's homes" (Детскиe домa). After reaching school age, all children enroll at internats (Школа-интернат) (boarding schools).

==== Russia ====
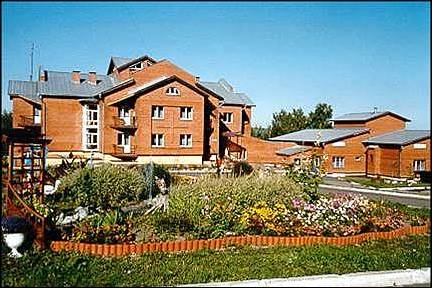
St. Nicholas Orphanage in Novosibirsk, Russia

In 2021 it was recorded that there were 406,138 orphans living in orphan homes and families in Russia. UNICEF estimates that 95% of these children are "social orphans", meaning that they have at least one living parent who has given them up to the state. In 2011 Russian authorities registered 88,522 children who became orphans that year (down from 114,715 in 2009).

There are few webpages for Russian orphanages in English. "Of a total of more than 600,000 children classified as being 'without parental care' (most of them live with other relatives and fosters), as many as one-third reside in institutions."

In 2011, there were 1344 institutions for orphans in Russia, including 1094 orphanages ("children's homes") and 207 special ("corrective") orphanages for children with serious health issues.

==== Azerbaijan ====
It is estimated that more than 10,000 children are living in 44 orphanages. In general, "many children are abandoned due to extreme poverty and harsh living conditions. Some may be raised by family members or neighbors but the majority live in crowded orphanages until the age of fifteen when they are sent into the community to make a living for themselves."

==== Belarus ====
Approximate total – 1,773 (1993 statistics for "all types of orphanages")

==== Kyrgyzstan ====
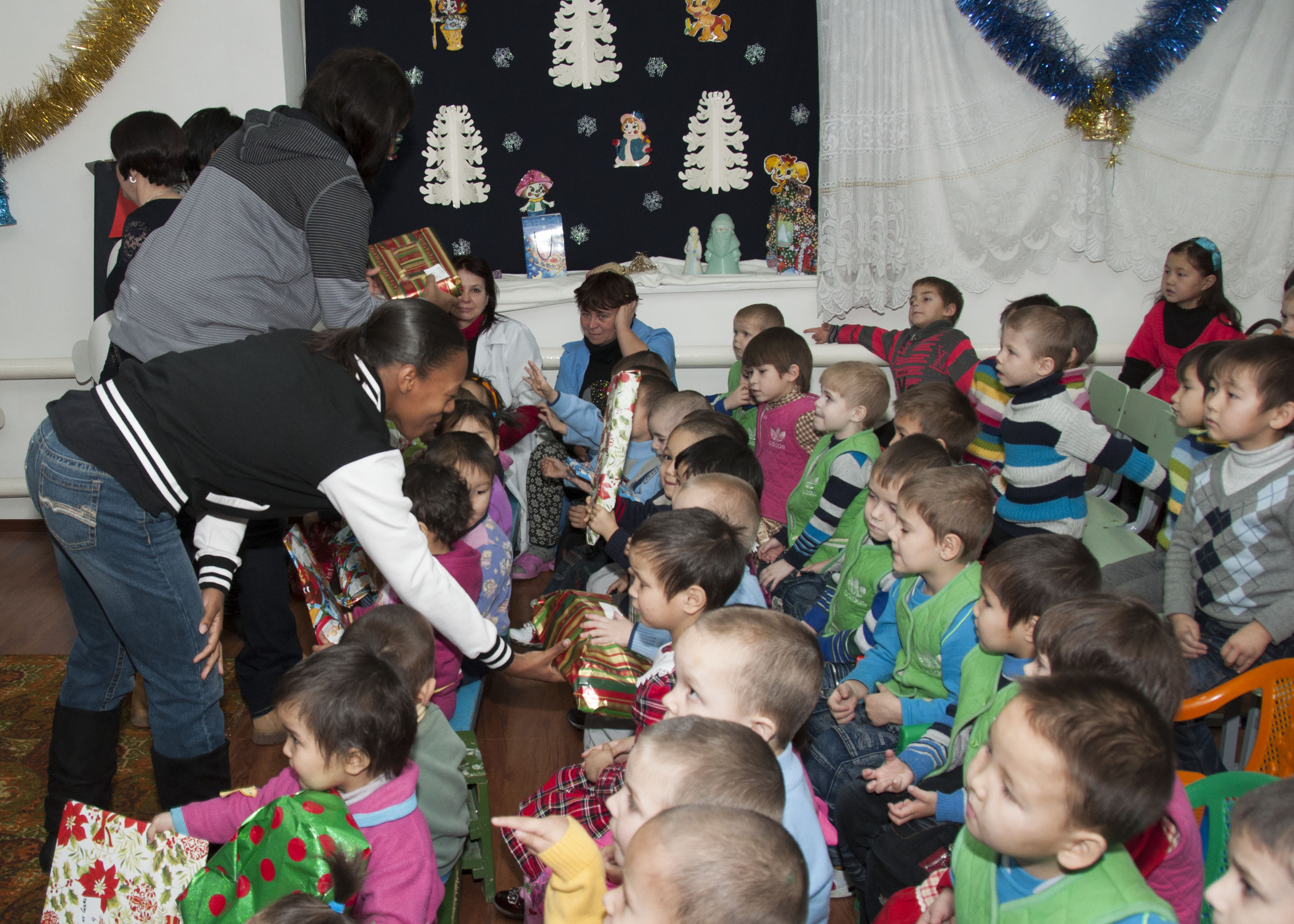
Belovodski Preschool Orphanage in Karabalta, Kyrgyzstan

Partial information: 85 – Ivanovka Orphanage

==== Tajikistan ====
There are 4 orphanages in the major cities and 64 boarding schools in Tajikistan, where 8275 children are being educated. Those four orphanages raise 185 children up to 3 years old. In total there are 160 orphans. This small number is likely due to the popularity of adopting.

==== Ukraine ====
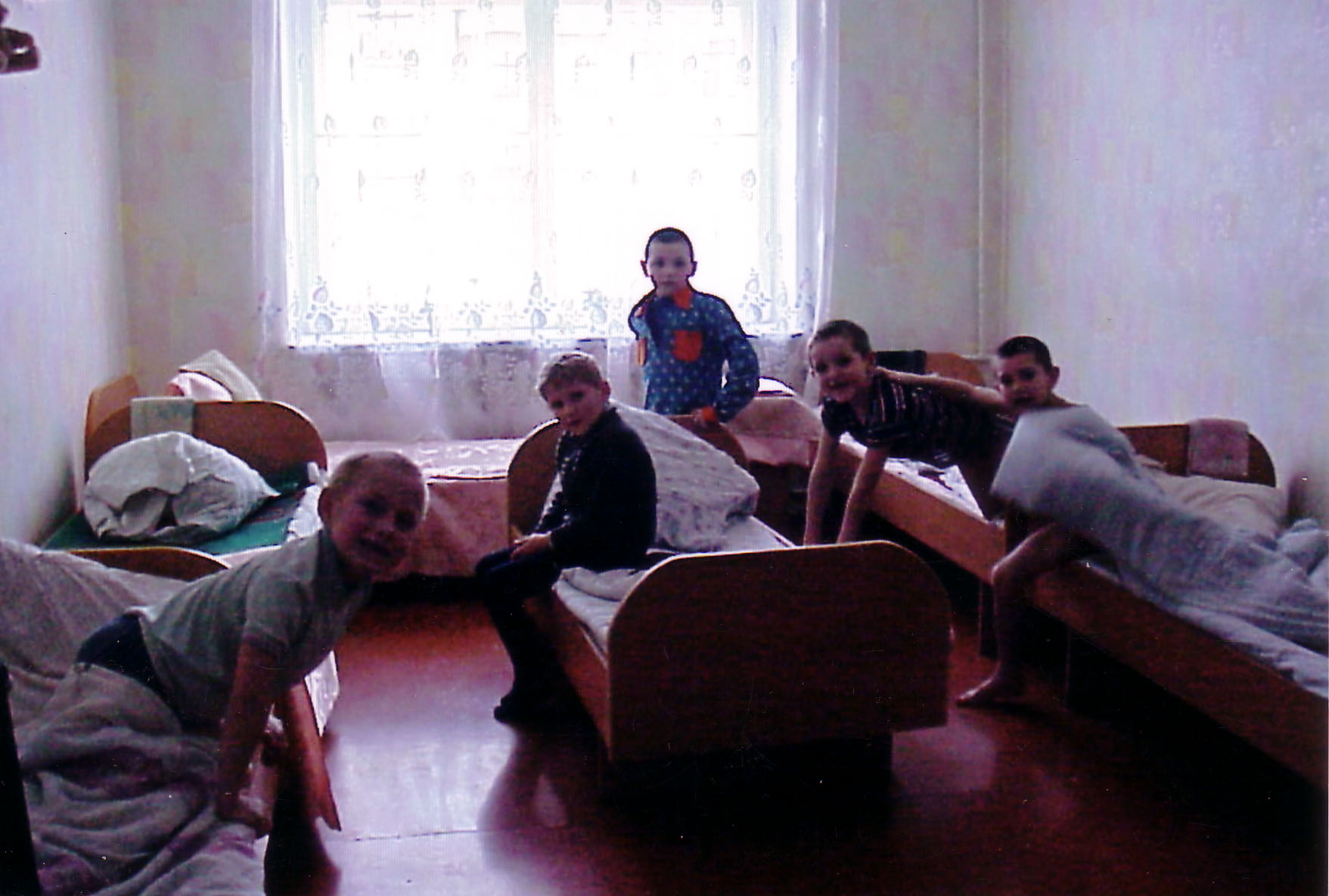
Orphanage in Ukraine

Before the Russian invasion of 2022, there were an estimated 100,000 orphans in Ukraine's state-run facilities. Of this number about 80 percent are described as "social orphans", because the parents are either financially destitute, abusive, or addicted to drugs or alcohol and thus are unable to raise them. Due to a lack of funding and overcrowding the conditions at these orphanages are often poor, especially for disabled children.

Since 2012 the number of children adopted by foreigners has gradually been reducing. By 2016, the number of children adopted by foreigners had been reduced to around 200 from about 2,000 in 2012. A bit more than a thousand children were adopted by Ukrainians in 2016. During 2019 1,419 children were adopted. In 2020 2,047 children were adopted, in 1,890 cases the adoption was carried out by citizens of Ukraine.

Other information:

- thousands – Zaporizhzhia Oblast.
- 150 – Kyiv State Baby Orphanage
- 30 – Beregena Orphanage
- 120 – Dom Invalid Orphanage

=== Oceania ===
==== Australia ====
Orphanages in Australia mostly closed after World War II. Instead, children are mainly put in either Kinship, Residential or Foster care. Notable former orphanages include the Melbourne Orphanage and the St. John's Orphanage in Goulburn, New South Wales.

==== Indonesia ====
No verifiable information for the number of children actually in orphanages. The number of orphaned and abandoned children is approximately 500,000.

==== Fiji ====
Orphans, children (0–17 years) orphaned due to all causes, 2005, estimate 25,000

=== North America and Caribbean ===
==== Haiti ====
Haitians and expatriate childcare professionals are careful to make it clear that Haitian orphanages and children's homes are not orphanages in the North American sense, but instead shelters for vulnerable children, often housing children whose parent(s) are poor as well as those who are abandoned, neglected or abused by family guardians. Neither the number of children or the number of institutions is officially known, but Chambre de L'Enfance Necessiteusse Haitienne (CENH) indicated that it has received requests for assistance from nearly 200 orphanages from around the country for more than 200,000 children. Although not all are orphans, many are vulnerable or originate in vulnerable families that "hoped to increase their children's opportunities by sending them to orphanages. Catholic Relief Services provides assistance to 120 orphanages with 9,000 children in the Ouest, Sud, Sud-Est and Grand'Anse, but these include only orphanages that meet their criteria. They estimate receiving ten requests per week for assistance from additional orphanages and children's homes, but some of these are repeat requests."

In 2007, UNICEF estimated there were 380,000 orphans in Haiti, which has a population of just over 9 million, according to the CIA World Factbook. However, since the January 2010 earthquake, the number of orphans has skyrocketed, and the living conditions for orphans have seriously deteriorated. Official numbers are hard to find due to the general state of chaos in the country.

==== Jamaica ====
A large amount of children on the island of Jamaica grow up without a parental relationship as a result of their parents' death. An example of places for these lone children to go to are SOS children's villages, The Maxfield Park Children's Home and the Missionaries of the Poor facilities.

==== Mexico ====
There are over 700 public and privates orphanages in Mexico which house over 30,000 children. In 2018 it was estimated that 400,000 children lacked parents. Of these 100,000 are thought to be homeless.

Some notable orphanages include:

- Casa Hogar Jeruel Orphanage in Chihuahua City, Mexico
- Casa Hogar Alegría

==== United States ====
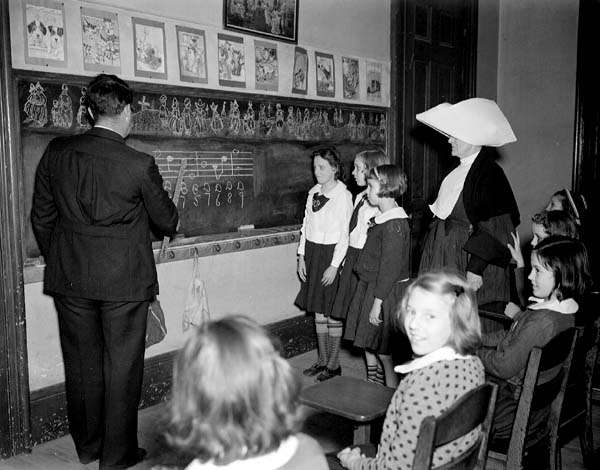
St. Elizabeth's orphanage in New Orleans, 1940

While the term "orphanage" is no longer typically used in the United States, nearly every US state continues to operate residential group homes for children in need of a safe place to live and in which to be supported in their educational and life-skills pursuits. Homes like the Milton Hershey School in Pennsylvania, Mooseheart in Illinois and the Crossnore School and Children's Home in North Carolina continue to provide care and support for children in need. While a place like the Milton Hershey School houses nearly 2,000 children, each child lives in a small group-home environment with "house parents" who often live many years in that home. Children who grow up in these residential homes have higher rates of high school and college graduation than those who spend equivalent numbers of years in the US Foster Care system, wherein only 44 to 66 percent of children graduate from high school.

Some private orphanages still exist in the United States apart from governmental child protective services processes. Following World War II, most orphanages in the U.S. began closing or converting to boarding schools or different kinds of group homes. Also, the term "children's home" became more common for those still existing. Since the 1980s orphanages in the U.S. have been replaced with smaller institutions that try to provide a group home or boarding school environment. Most children who would have been in orphanages are in these residential treatment centers (RTC), residential child care communities, or with foster families. Adopting from RTCs, group homes, or foster families does not require working with an adoption agency, and in many areas, fostering to adopt is highly encouraged.

=== Central and South America ===
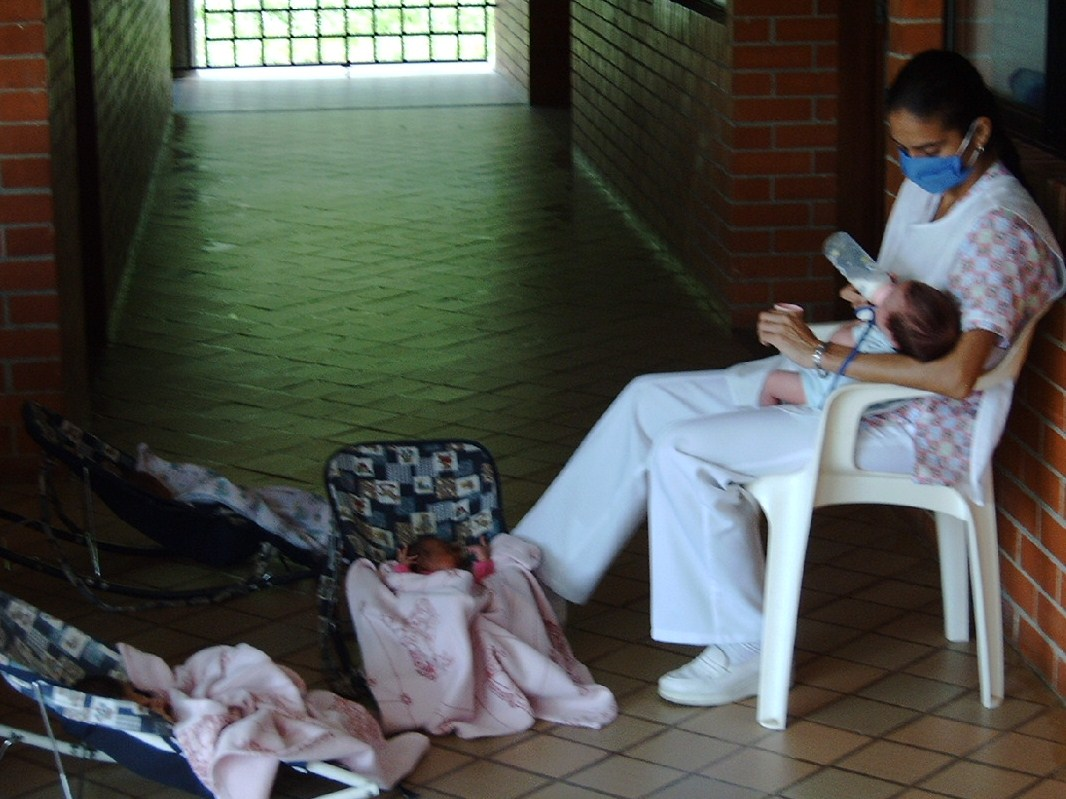
In a Colombian orphanage, a nurse takes care of three children.

==== Guatemala ====
"...currently there are about 200,000 children in orphanages."

==== Peru ====
It is estimated that 550,000 children grow up without parents in Peru. Many of the children in orphanages are considered "social orphans".

== Significant charities that help orphans ==
Prior to the establishment of state care for orphans in First World countries, private charities existed to take care of destitute orphans, over time other charities have found other ways to care for children.

- The Orphaned Starfish Foundation is a non-profit organisation based in New York City that focuses on developing vocational schools for orphans, victims of abuse and at-risk youth. It runs fifty computer centers in twenty-five countries, serving over 10,000 children worldwide
- Lumos works to replace institutions with community-based services that provide children with access to health, education, and social care tailored to their individual needs.
- Helping Children Worldwide, Inc, is a faith-based 501(c)3 NGO with a mission of strengthening families and communities and collaborating to deploy orphan prevention strategies in poor resource countries. HCW works with local NGO's to keep children in families and reintegrate children who have been separated from family, as an alternative to building orphanages and causing longterm generational harm, with health systems strengthening to ensure parent survival, and economic empowerment to ensure families survive and community service supports are available. Helping Children Worldwide works globally, out of its International Headquarters in Washington, D.C., and in Sierra Leone, through its locally registered NGO, supporting other NGOs in Africa and elsewhere.
- Hope and Homes for Children are working with governments to deinstitutionalize their child care systems.
- Stockwell Home and later Birchington, started by Charles H Spurgeon, is now Spurgeons after the last orphanage closed in 1979. Spurgeons Children's Charity provides support to vulnerable and disadvantaged children and families across England.
- SOS Children's Villages is the world's largest non-governmental, non-denominational child welfare organization that provides loving family homes for orphaned and abandoned children.
- Dr. Barnardo's Homes are now simply Barnardo's after closing their last orphanage in 1989.
- OAfrica, previously OrphanAid Africa, has been working in Ghana since 2002, to get children out of orphanages and into families, in partnership with the government and as the only private implementing partner of the National Plan of Action.
- Joint Council on International Children's Services is a nonprofit child advocacy organization based in Alexandria, Virginia. It is the largest association of international adoption agencies in America, and in addition to working in 51 countries, advocates for ethical practices in American adoption agencies

== In popular culture ==
- The musical Annie is about an orphan (Annie) who grows up at an orphanage, and later moves in with a millionaire. A 1982 film and 2014 film remake are based on the musical.
- The Argentine children's and teenager telenovela Chiquititas and its later variations and film adaptations are about an orphanage where young kids and teenagers live at and solve coming-of-age situations. The telenovela was a huge success and spawned a number of remakes in other countries.
- In the Big Lez Show episode "Ahow" Clarence promises to make a donation to an orphanage after winning a million dollars on a scratchcard before losing it.

== See also ==
- Adoption
- Boys Town (organization)
- Child abandonment
- Child abuse
- Child and family services
- Child and youth care
- Community-based care
- Congregate Care
- Cottage Homes
- Deinstitutionalisation
- Family support
- Florida Sheriffs Youth Ranches
- Foster Care
- Foster Care in the United States
- Group home
- Hope and Homes for Children
- Janusz Korczak
- Kinship Care
- List of orphanages
- Orphan Train
- Poverty in the United States
  - History of poverty in the United States
- Residential Care
  - Residential Child Care Communities
  - Residential education
  - Residential treatment center
- Settlement movement
- Teaching-family model
- The Steele Home Orphanage
- Wraparound (childcare)
- Whole Child International
