= Wycliffe Chapel =

Coordinates: 51°30′59″N 0°3′32″W

The Wycliffe Chapel was a Congregational Chapel at 44 Philpot Street, London. It came there from Cannon Street Road and traced its roots to one of the early Independent congregations which met from 1642 at Haydon's Yard, Minories, and then in Smithfield.

== History ==
The chapel in New Road (the original name of part of Cannon Street Road) was built in 1780, with a schoolroom added in 1785 and a Sunday School in 1790. It was long and narrow, seating up to 800 people, and lit by brass chandeliers holding candles (which had to be trimmed mid-service). It had a large burial ground, whose story is recounted here and here. Its minister from 1811 was the noted philanthropist Rev Dr Andrew Reed (1787-1862). In 1831 it moved to larger premises in a new building named Wycliffe Chapel, On Philpot Street; here the congregation grew from 100 to 2,000.

Reed had been a watchmaker's apprentice and worked at his parents' china shop in Butcher Row - Beaumont House, dating from 1581 and named for the French ambassador who lived there in the time of King James I; ornamented with roses, crowns, fleurs-le-lys and dragons, it was demolished in 1813. He became a member of the congregation when Thomas Bryson was the minister.

Bryson's successor was Samuel Lyndall, trained at Rotherham Academy, and formerly a minister in Bridlington; in 1805 he published a sermon on Popery.

In 1813, from his home in St George's Place, the East London Orphan Asylum was established, initially based at a house in Clark[e]'s Terrace, Cannon Street Road. (A couple of years earlier, he had rescued three orphan apprentices, whose master, a shoemaker in Rosemary Lane [now Royal Mint Street] had become bankrupt - no doubt this was part of his inspiration). Reed was adept at obtaining patrons (the Duke of Kent attended the inaugural dinner), and larger sites followed, first in Hackney Road for boys and Bethnal Green for girls, then at Clapton, then (following the cholera epidemic) at Watford, and now Reed's School in Cobham. He also founded an Infant Orphan Asylum, later called the Royal Wanstead School in 1827; the Asylum for Fatherless Children, later established in Purley and called Reedham School in 1844; the Asylum for Idiots, later the Royal Earlswood Hospital, Redhill in 1847; and the Royal Hospital for Incurables, now in Putney, in 1854. Although he was aware that providing Anglican instruction (particularly the Catechism) would attract greater patronage, he fought - not always successfully - for his institutions to be non-denominational. He and his wife Elizabeth were hymn-writers; his hymn Spirit divine, attend our prayers still features in some hymnals. In 1834 he visited the United States, and Yale University made him a Doctor of Divinity.

== Controversy surrounding his novel No Fiction: A Narrative Founded on Recent and Interesting Facts (1819) ==
Controversy surrounded Reed's religious novel No Fiction: A Narrative Founded on Recent and Interesting Facts (1819; in print for many years; over 20 editions). Its characters were said to have been based on members of the congregation as well as Reed himself. Francis Barnett (Lefèvre in the book), who was unstable, entered into bitter exchanges, including The Hero of No Fiction, or, Memoirs of Francis Barnett, with letters and authentic documents (1823) and spent some time in an asylum as a result. In November 1820 Reed published The Pastor's Acknowledgment - A Sermon occasioned by the occurrence of the 9th Anniversary of the Ordination.He provided his own epitaph:-

"I was born yesterday, I shall die tomorrow,

And I must not spend today in telling what I have done, But in doing what I may for HIM who has done all for me. I sprang from the people, I have lived for the people – The most for the most unhappy; and the people when They know it will not suffer me to die out of loving remembrance."

== Isaac Kaliski and the Philpot Street Great Synagogue scandal ==
In 1908 the chapel became the Philpot Street Great Synagogue whose secretary was Isaac Kaliski, later known as Isaac Kaye. He was also the Secretary of the Reliance Deposit & Loan Company, which was voluntarily wound up in 1920 with chairman Abraham Moses and Kaliski as liquidators. The site is now occupied by buildings of the Royal London Hospital.

Kaliski was a tailor by trade, and was involved with several local synagogues, serving as Secretary both of Old Castle Street and Princelet Street synagogues, and of the Chevra Tehillim u'mishmorim (Society for Chanting the Psalms and Visiting the Sick) at the latter - the first of a number of similar societies. He also became Secretary of Philpot Street Great Synagogue,

In 1923 Kaliski, giving the synagogue as his address, was convicted of what the magistrate described as one of the worst cases of fraud he had seen.

Kaye died in 1933 at Finchley Road, Golders Green The Isaac Kalisky Kaye charity for the Jewish Poor, income to be distributed among the deserving poor of Southend and Westcliffe, was closed in 2001.

== See further ==
- D Grist A Victorian Charity (R.V. Hatt 1974), Ian J. Shaw's biography The Greatest is Charity (Evangelical Press 2005)
- James McMillan & Norman Alvey Faith is the Spur (Reed's School Cobham 1993 - the school has a Reed archive).
- Reed, Andrew & Reed, Charles (1863) Memoirs of the Life and Philanthropic Labours of Andrew Reed, D.D.: With Selections from His Journals. Strahan & co.
