= The Steele Home =

The Steele Home Orphanage was founded by Almira S. Steele after the passing of her late husband, Walter Steele. The orphanage was established to serve African American children of the South, it opened in 1884. When the orphanage was first established it housed only three children; however, by 1925 the Steele Home had housed over sixteen hundred children. The home was located on Strait and Magnolia in Chattanooga, Tennessee. The Steele Home orphanage was the only orphanage in Chattanooga after Reconstruction that opened to African American children. During the lifetime of Almira Steele, African American children were often excluded from orphanages and denied care, thus making the Steele Home a unique institution. The Steele Home was founded in order to provide equal opportunity care for children of African American ethnicity.

== Almira S. Steele's Journey to Chattanooga ==
Almira S. Steele came to Chattanooga with the intent to help needy children, during the time period directly following reconstruction, disease was running rampant. Orphaned African American children needed proper care and a place to call home after their parents had been claimed by ailments such as yellow fever, and were being denied by preexisting orphanages due to their race. Almira took action against the diseases and abandonment facing children of African American Backgrounds and with the establishment of the Steele Home provided a home as well as a Religious upbringing. Almira also ensured that her children were fed and kept healthy which gave the children a drastically different quality of life then they would have had on the streets. Mrs. Steele took the orphans rejected by other children's homes due to their race, health, or age. Almira was provided with little to no help from outside sources when constructing her orphanage, she was solely responsible for the orphanage that served the children of Chattanooga.

== Backlash against the Orphanage ==
In November 1885, the orphanage experienced controversy from the city of Chattanooga when arsonists targeted the orphanage and burnt it to the ground. Almira reached out to the community around her and rallied support in order to build another, bigger orphanage for the African American children of the city of Chattanooga. Steele was able to raise $18,000 for the second Steele Orphanage which allowed her to accommodate even more children than before. After the completion of the new orphanage the African American Community continued to showcase its support by providing financial aid to Almira and her orphans. The workers of The Loomis and Hart Manufacturing Company donated a portion of their salaries in order to aid Mrs. Steele with the cost of upkeep for the orphanage.

== The Memorialization of the Steele Home ==
The Steele Home resulted in a place for African American children to come home as well as a second chance for orphans. Today, the Steele Home Orphanage has been demolished however, a marker is placed on the University of Tennessee at Chattanooga's campus to pay tribute to Almira Steele's accomplishments.

== The End of the Steele Home ==
Almira S. Steele died in 1925; however, her legacy and life's work has lived on through the children she watched over. The Avondale SDA School is the first African American Seventh-day Adventist Church and school in Chattanooga, Tennessee. Children from the Steele Home created the church and it evolved to incorporate a school over time. Almira Steele's influence is still seen today on the campus of the University of Tennessee at Chattanooga, as well as in an educational and religious institution located in Chattanooga.
