= Andrew Reed (minister) =

English Congregational minister & hymnwriter (1787-1862)

- Reverend Andrew Reed
- Born: 27 November 1787
- Died: 25 February 1862 (aged 74); Hackney, London
- Resting place: Abney Park Cemetery, London
- Occupations: Congregational minister and hymnwriter
- Spouse: Elizabeth Holmes Reed
- Children: Sir Charles Reed Andrew Reed

Andrew Reed (27 November 1787 – 25 February 1862) was an English Congregational minister and hymnwriter, who became a prominent philanthropist and social reformer. He was the father of Sir Charles Reed and grandfather of Talbot Baines Reed.

== Life ==
His parents were "humble tradespeople" and he was originally an apprentice.

He entered Hackney Academy in 1807 to study theology under George Collison and was ordained minister of New Road Chapel in 1811. About 1830 he built the larger Wycliffe Chapel, where he remained until 1861. He visited America on a deputation to the Congregational Churches in 1834 and received the degree of DD from Yale. In addition to an account of his visit to America (2 vols., 1834), he compiled a hymn-book (1841), and published some sermons and books of devotion.

Reed's name is permanently associated with a long list of philanthropic achievements, including the London Orphan Asylum (now Reed's School), the Infant Orphan Asylum, Wanstead, and the Reedham Orphanage, which he undertook on non-denominational lines because the governors of the other institutions had made the Anglican Catechism compulsory. Besides these he originated in 1847 an asylum for idiots at Highgate, afterwards moved to Earlswood in Surrey with a branch at Colchester, and in 1855 the Royal Hospital for Incurables at Putney.

His monument, a tall obelisk of polished red granite, can be seen today at the London Congregationalists' garden cemetery, Abney Park Cemetery close to that of his son, Charles Reed, the eminent lay Congregationalist, typefounder, and chairman of the first London School Board. His other sons were Rev. Andrew Reed, of St Leonards, and Dr. Martin Reed, who ran schools in Hastings and later Bournemouth.

== Religious and philanthropic work ==
Reed was the minister of New Road Chapel, St George's-in-the-East, then at Wycliffe Chapel, Philpot Street, Stepney (which he helped to build in 1830 and in which a memorial tablet was placed upon his death). He founded several important charitable institutions on a non-denominational basis, including the Idiot Asylum at Earlswood now the Royal Earlswood Hospital; the Infant Orphan Asylum (1827) at Wanstead; the Royal Hospital for Incurables (1855) at Putney now the Royal Hospital for Neuro-disability; and the London Asylum for Orphans 1813, initially at Lower Clapton in the parish of Hackney, but later moved to Watford and then, in 1946, to Cobham, Surrey, where as Reed's School, it is a private or fee-paying school. In 1844 Reed founded the Asylum for Fatherless Children, which he undertook on non-denominational lines because the governors of the other institutions had made the Anglican catechism compulsory. In 1858 the school moved to Purley, Surrey and became known as Reedham Orphanage, in honour of its founder.

In addition to raising considerable sums from benefactors to found and maintain philanthropic institutions, Andrew Reed raised funds for chapel-building. At the height of this endeavour, in 1837, he was pledging to raise one hundred guineas for four chapels, and fifty for another three, besides smaller sums for several others. Two such successes were the Congregational chapel at Hounslow which opened in 1835, and another at Woodford where he preached the opening sermon in 1836.

Elizabeth Holmes Reed (1794–1867), Reed's wife, worked with him in many of these charitable causes. She wrote about twenty hymns for the Hymn Book which he published in a new and enlarged edition in 1842, doubling the number her husband had written for inclusion, and authored Original Tales for Children and The Mother's Manual for Training Her Children (1865). Besides the active role of his wife, Reed's philanthropic output reflected his talent in forming a vast social network of generous and influential donors and supporters, including Sir Morton Peto, James Sherman, Francis Cox, Dr Leifchild, Lord Dudley Stuart, Angela Burdett Coutts, Lord Morpeth, Lord Robert Grosvenor, the Gurneys, Lushingtons and Morleys.

His approach to religious teaching was inclusive; as emphasised in his will it is my particular and last request to the Boards of the London Orphan Asylum and Infant Orphan Asylum that, while they may choose to regulate the religious teaching by a catechism generally, they provide that no catechism shall be imposed on any child... and that the institution be open to all destitute orphans without respect to sex, creed, place or country. His religious emphasis appears to have been in the spirit of 1 Corinthians 13: that of the three virtues, Faith, Hope and Charity, the greatest is charity. One of his projects did not succeed in being nondenominational, however; at a fairly early stage in its history the Orphan Asylum at Wanstead was taken over by a management committee who ruled that all children must be brought up in the Church of England, a move that disadvantaged many of London's orphans who had been brought up with different religious backgrounds.

== Political and social reform ==
Reed was active in supporting repeal of the Corn Laws, Dr Philip's initiative to right some of the wrongs of the native people of South Africa by financing their trip to London to speak directly to a Committee of the House of Commons, and took part in conferences in America (as one of two international delegates from the Congregational Union of England & Wales) in the 1830s, one of which led to the formation of Boston's first anti-slavery society. In his account of his American visit, he wrote Yes, the slave must go free! Slavery now has a legal existence only in America. But America is the very place, of all others, where it cannot, must not be tolerated.... Besides this, there is another field of philanthropic service open to America. It is that of seeking the welfare of the aborigines of the country. They are far less thought of, at the present moment, than the oppressed African; but their claims are not inferior, nor scarcely are their wrongs. They amount to about 500,000 persons. They have the highest claim to the soil. Justice, Truth, Mercy, Religion—Earth and Heaven, demand of America that she should assure the world she is what she professes to be, by preserving the Indian, and emancipating the African. His son, Charles became more directly active in politics, becoming an MP and chairman of the first London School Board.

== Death and memorial ==
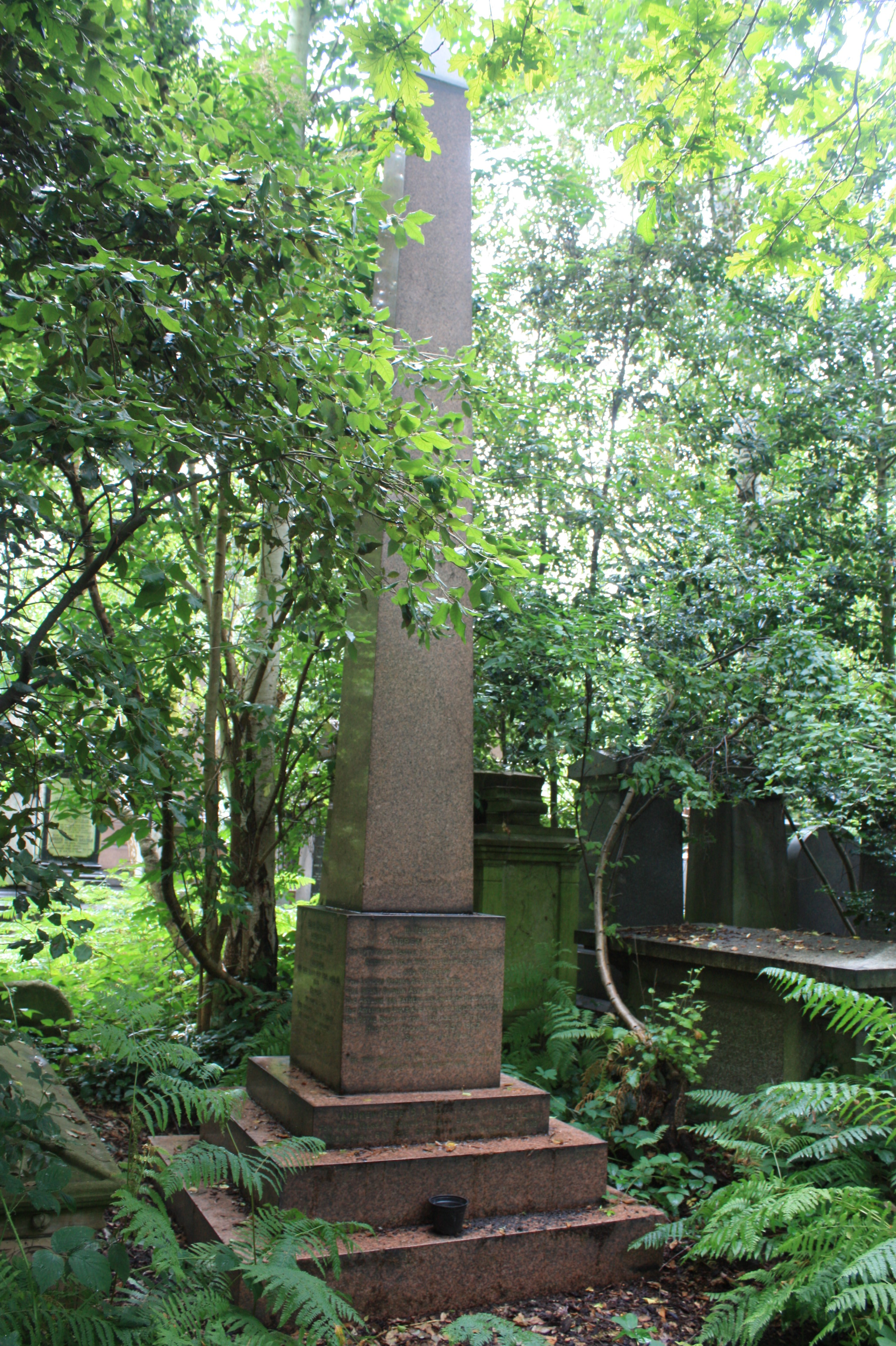
The grave of Andrew Reed, Abney Park Cemetery, London

Reed died in Hackney, London, and was buried in Abney Park Cemetery in Stoke Newington, north-east London. His memorial stands at Abney House Corner, towards the south end of this Congregationalists' non-denominational cemetery. It is a tall, imposing obelisk in polished red granite situated close to the later memorial to one of his sons, Sir Charles Reed (Hackney's first MP and a Trustee Director of Abney Park Cemetery). A grand Celtic cross in memory of his grandson Talbot Baines Reed stands nearby. His eldest son, Andrew (1817–1899), a Congregational minister and author, is buried with him. There is no memorial to his wife Elizabeth, and her place of burial is uncertain but may be with her parents. Andrew and Elizabeth's first child, Jasper Holmes Reed (d. 21 July 1818), was buried at the Anglican church of St Mary, Lewisham.

== Books ==
- Reed, Andrew & Matheson, James (1823). Martha: a memorial of an only & beloved sister. London:Westley & Longman.
- Reed, Andrew (1835). A Narrative of the Visit to the American Churches, By The Deputation From The Congregational Union of England And Wales. New York:Harper.
- Gutzlaff, Charles, revised by Reed, Andrew (1838). China Opened: or a display of the topography, history, customs, manners, arts, manufactures, commerce, literature, religion, jurisprundence, etc. of the Chinese Empire. London:Smith Elder. Vol II.
- Reed, Andrew (1842). Hymn Book, Prepared from Dr. Watts' Psalms and Hymns and Other Hymns, with Some Originals
- Reed, Andrew Revival of Religion in Wycliffe Chapel (1843)
- Reed, Andrew & Reed, Charles (1863) Memoirs of the Life and Philanthropic Labours of Andrew Reed, D.D.: With Selections from His Journals. Strahan & co.

== Sources ==
- Reed, Andrew (1835) A Narrative of the Visit to the American Churches, by the Deputation from The Congregational Union of England and Wales. New York: Harper
- Reed, Charles & Andrew (1863) Memoirs of the Life and Philanthropic Labours of Andrew Reed. London:Strahan
