= Reedham Orphanage =

Coronation Drill at Reedham Orphanage (1911), a Kinemacolor film

Reedham Orphanage was founded in 1844 in Richmond, London as the Asylum for Fatherless Children by Rev Andrew Reed, taking children of both sexes and giving them food, shelter and education until the age of 13 and 14.

== History ==
It quickly outgrew the Richmond premises and relocated to Stoke Newington, then to Stamford Hill in 1846. It immediately began fundraising for a new home. The funds for the site were raised by 1853.

At long last … we have purchased an estate three miles from Croydon on the trunk line of the Dover and Brighton Railway. It is paid for (the cost was £3,895). We shall put our Asylum on the crown of the Hill.

— Rev Andrew Reed, 1853

The orphanage in Purley, Surrey was opened in 1858 with a capacity of 300.

When Andrew Reed died in 1862, the asylum's name was changed to Reedham in his honour.

The orphanage included a school for the children and a non-sectarian church which was added in 1879. When the local railway station opened in 1911, it took the Reedham name. The school was evacuated to Nottingham from July 1944 to June 1945.

The home was closed in 1980 and sold for redevelopment. The proceeds established the Reedham Trust. The Purley site is now occupied by a housing estate adjacent to St Nicholas School and Beaumont Primary School.

== Reedham Trust ==
The Trust fulfils the original intent of the asylum by funding a boarding school education for children who, through loss or incapacity of their parents, need to attend a boarding school. Their focus "is on boarding need rather than educational need".

The trust is run from the former lodge building of the orphanage.

== See also ==
- Infant Orphan Asylum
- London Orphan Asylum
