= 1996 Lijiang earthquake =

Natural disaster in Yunnan, China

- Location within Yunnan
- UTC time: 1996-02-03 11:14:22
- ISC event: 945500
- USGS-ANSS: ComCat
- Local date: February 3, 1996
- Local time: 19:14:22 CST
- Magnitude: 6.6 M_{w}
- Depth: 11 km (6.8 mi)
- Epicenter: 27.30°N 100.29°E
- Areas affected: China, Lijiang City, Yunnan
- Max. intensity: MMI IX (Violent)
- Casualties: 309–322 killed 16,925–17,057 injured

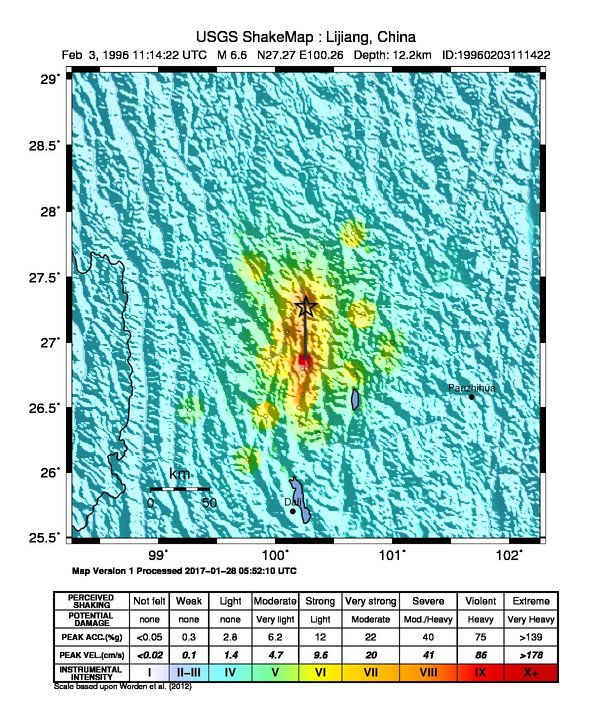

The 1996 Lijiang earthquake occurred at 19:14 on 3 February near Lijiang City, Yunnan in southwestern China. The shock measured 6.6 on the moment magnitude scale and had a maximum Mercalli intensity of IX (Violent).

== Earthquake ==
According to authorities, up to 322 people died and more than 17,000 were injured. About 358,000 buildings were destroyed, and 320,000 people were made homeless.

=== Damage ===
The earthquake destroyed many structures and buildings in the region; property damage was estimated at 506 million US dollars. In addition to damage to structures, it triggered more than 200 landslides in a 12,000 km^{2} area. Many further landslides occurred in the months afterwards, as monsoon rains swept away debris already loosened, and as late as 1999, scientists warned that widespread ground fracturing throughout much of the area might lead to further landsliding in the event of heavy rain.

=== Aftershocks ===
One hundred and eighty-four aftershocks occurred in the first 26 hours, including 18 which measured between 4.0 and 4.8 on the Richter scale.

== Aftermath ==
Many high-rise buildings in the area were torn down and traditional single-family dwellings were constructed in their place. Reconstruction assistance from the provincial government and the World Bank was used to restore traditional streets, bridges, and canals. These efforts played a major role in Lijiang's efforts to achieve the World Heritage Site designation by UNESCO. The Lijiang Ethnic Orphan School was established to cater for earthquake victims.

== See also ==
- List of earthquakes in China
- List of earthquakes in Yunnan
