= Lijiang Ethnic Orphan School =

- Lijiang, Yunnan; China

Information
- Type: Primary school, Junior High School
- Established: 1999
- Principal: Principal Zhang
- Faculty: 40
- Grades: 1-9

Lijiang Ethnic Orphan School (丽江 民族 孤儿院 Lì-jiāng mín-zú gū-ér-yuàn) is a multi-year institution for orphans, primarily from the 1996 Lijiang earthquake, 1998 Lijiang earthquake and the 2008 Sichuan earthquake. Located in the Lijiang City in the Yunnan province in China, the school provides education and housing for orphans of various Chinese ethnicities, including Naxi, Han, Bai, and Yi. There are around 300 orphans who attend this school.

== History ==
The Lijiang Ethnic Orphan School was established in 1999. Under the help of China Children and Teenagers' Fund, forty-two children from the 2008 Sichuan earthquake went to this orphanage school in Yunnan.

== Activities ==
The children attend class in the morning, the afternoon, and at night. They have their own vegetable garden. They perform with cultural instruments as well as electric guitars, drums, and piano. Before lunch every day, the students recite a poem, stating they will not waste their food.
