= Orphaned Starfish Foundation =

American non-profit organization

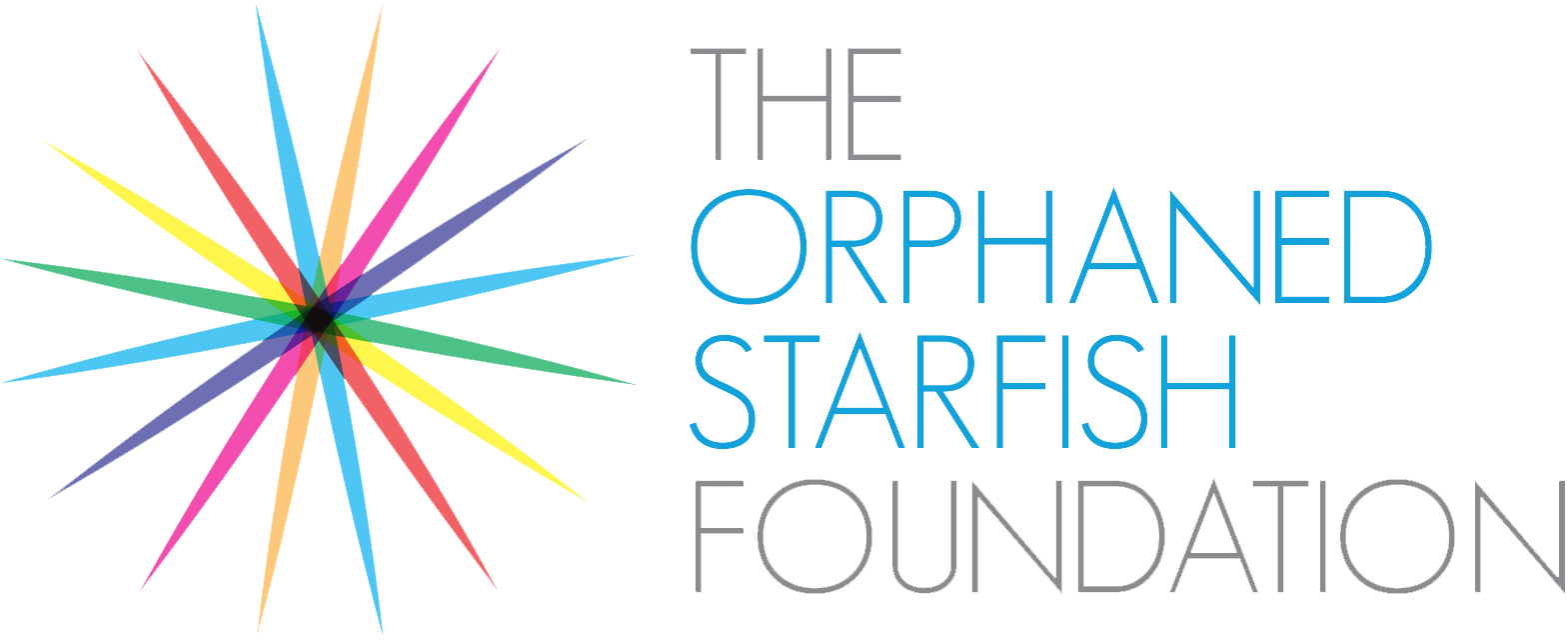

The Orphaned Starfish Foundation (OSF) is a 501(c)3 non-profit organization focused on developing vocational centers for orphans, victims of abuse and at-risk youth. Through the creation of computer centers and a focus on the development of computer literacy, OSF creates increased employment opportunities for the children they serve. It runs fifty computer centers in twenty-five countries, serving over 10,000 children worldwide.

== History ==
OSF was founded by Andy Stein, a philanthropist with a background in international banking. While working as the joint head of corporate finance in the Philippines for Chase Bank, Stein became 'financially and emotionally' connected to working with orphans and orphanages. He insisted any clients who wanted to pitch business must also arrange a visit to an orphanage. In Chile, Stein spoke with a nun, who informed him of the challenges that face orphans after leaving the orphanage, including homelessness, drug addiction and prostitution. This inspired him to file the necessary paperwork to create a charity, and raise funds for a state-of-the-art computer center for the orphanage in Santiago.

The foundation is named for Loren Eiseley's famous parable about a young man throwing starfish into the ocean. When the man is told he cannot possibly make a difference saving one starfish at a time he replies, "It makes a difference [ . . . ] for that one." Stein identifies this as the mission of OSF--though the foundation will never save all the orphans, it "starts with just one starfish."

== Programs and Initiatives ==
OSF funds the construction, maintenance and staffing of vocational training facilities. These include over 50 computer centers, for which they have provided furnishings, computers and computer equipment as well as funding for teachers, English language programs, job placement, and scholarships. Stein identifies the development of life skills as essential to the foundations work, and programs include training on how to manage a budget, obtain independent housing, and maintain a healthy lifestyle. Once a center is established, OSF commits to their operation "for life".

A staple of Stein's personal visits to the orphanage are his magic shows. He is known by the orphans as 'Tio Mago', uncle magician, and he considers magic a tool in his outreach: "It's a way to make the children feel like they have the ability to do anything in the world."

== Funding ==
OSF is a registered 501c3 charity, and its budget is generated in large part from the general public. The Annual Gala in New York City raises 80 percent of their annual operating income as well as the entirety of their scholarship fund.
