= Lizhuang =

Lizhuang could refer to the following towns in China:

- Lizhuang, Dangshan County, in Dangshan County, Anhui
- Lizhuang, Ganyu County, in Ganyu County, Jiangsu
- Lizhuang, Huimin County, in Huimin County, Shandong
- Lizhuang, Mianning County, in Mianning County, Sichuan
- Lizhuang, Tancheng County, in Tancheng County, Shandong
- Lizhuang, Yibin, in Cuiping District, Yibin, Sichuan
