= Xichehe =

Town in Hunan, China

Coordinates: 29°4′24″N 109°31′53″E

Xichehe (洗车河镇) is a town and township in Longshan County, in Xiangxi Tujia and Miao Autonomous Prefecture of Hunan Province, China.

Xichehe is home to the Tujia people. The Sheba Festival is celebrated annually at the town's grand ancestral temple, and the Tujia language is spoken. The Dragon Boat Festival features dragon boat racing on the river.

80 per cent of the children in Xichehe are left-behind children. Many elderly residents are hard pressed to care properly for the children for whom they are responsible, leaving the children in need of emotional as well as material support. A children's charity has built a drop-in center, which provides a safe place with beds, a meal, and a chance to talk, and serves 200 children.
