= Lizhuang, Dangshan County =

Lizhuang 李庄镇
- Town
- Location within China
- Coordinates: 34°23′29″N 116°28′58″E
- Country: China
- Province: Anhui
- Prefecture-level city: Suzhou
- County: Dangshan County

Population (2010)
  - Total: 45,817

Lizhuang (simplified Chinese: 李庄镇; traditional Chinese: 李莊鎮; pinyin: Lǐzhuāng Zhèn) is a town in Dangshan County, Suzhou, Anhui Province, China. As of the 2010 Chinese Census, Lizhuang has a population of 45,817.

The town has a humid subtropical climate. Many in Lizhuang are farmers, growing corn, pomegranates, and various vegetables. There is also a small coal mine in the town. Many of Lizhuang's adults have migrated elsewhere for work, leaving a large number of left-behind children to be raised by their grandparents.

Traditional houses in the town are made from stone held together with a paste made from ashes. Remittances from migrant workers have enabled some residents to construct homes with modern building materials such as bricks, roofing tile and cement.

== Administrative divisions ==
Lizhuang administers three residential communities and five administrative villages.

=== Residential communities ===
Lizhuang administers the following three residential communities:

- Zhenxing Community (Chinese: 振兴社区)
- Zhudian Community (Chinese: 朱店社区)
- Bianlou Community (Chinese: 卞楼社区)

=== Administrative villages ===
Lizhuang administers the following five administrative villages:

- Haisheng Xincun Village (Chinese: 海升新村村)
- Liyuan Xincun Village (Chinese: 李园新村村)
- Wangge Village (Chinese: 汪阁村)
- Zhendong Village (Chinese: 镇东村)
- Jialou Village (Chinese: 贾楼村)

== Demographics ==
According to the 2010 Chinese Census, Lizhuang has a population of 45,817, down from the 49,845 recorded in the 2000 Chinese Census.

In 2010, a Los Angeles Times reporter wrote a story on Lizhuang, using it as a microcosm for the growing phenomenon of left-behind children in China. In the story, the reporter found few able-bodied adults in the town, as many left to find more lucrative work elsewhere. Much of Lizhuang's elderly population was left taking care of their children.

== Economy ==
Many people in Lizhuang are subsistence farmers, and common crops in the town include corn, pomegranates, and various vegetables.

The town also has a coal mine, although it is not as large as those found in surrounding towns.
