= Euro-orphan =

Child whose parents have left for another EU member state

Euro-orphan or EU orphan is a neologism used metaphorically to describe a "social orphan" in the European Union whose parents have migrated to another member state, typically for economic reasons. The child is left behind, often in the care of older relatives. The expression itself is a misnomer since it is meant to describe temporary child abandonment rather than the death of both parents. A similar name is White Orphans.

Such abandoned children may require therapeutic or psychiatric care to cope. The EU supports family reunification. Migrating families are sometimes divided by local child services like Jugendamt. The number of Euro-orphans in the EU is estimated to be between 0.5–1 million, most of whom live outside the EU, e.g. in Ukraine.

A similar term, "old euro-orphans", describes elderly parents left behind by migrants.

== Media ==
- "Euroorphans – the children left behind" - documentary by Sven Bergman
- "I am Kuba" - documentary by Åse Svenheim Drivenes

== Books ==
- Anne White, Polish Families and Migration Since EU Accession, 2017

== See also ==
- Abandoned child syndrome
- Child displacement
- Dead mother complex
- Maternal deprivation
- Migrations from Poland since EU accession
- Parental alienation
- Separation anxiety
- Social orphan
- Transnational child protection
- Unaccompanied minor
- List of European Union member states by average wage
- Left-behind children in China
