= Orphans in Russia =

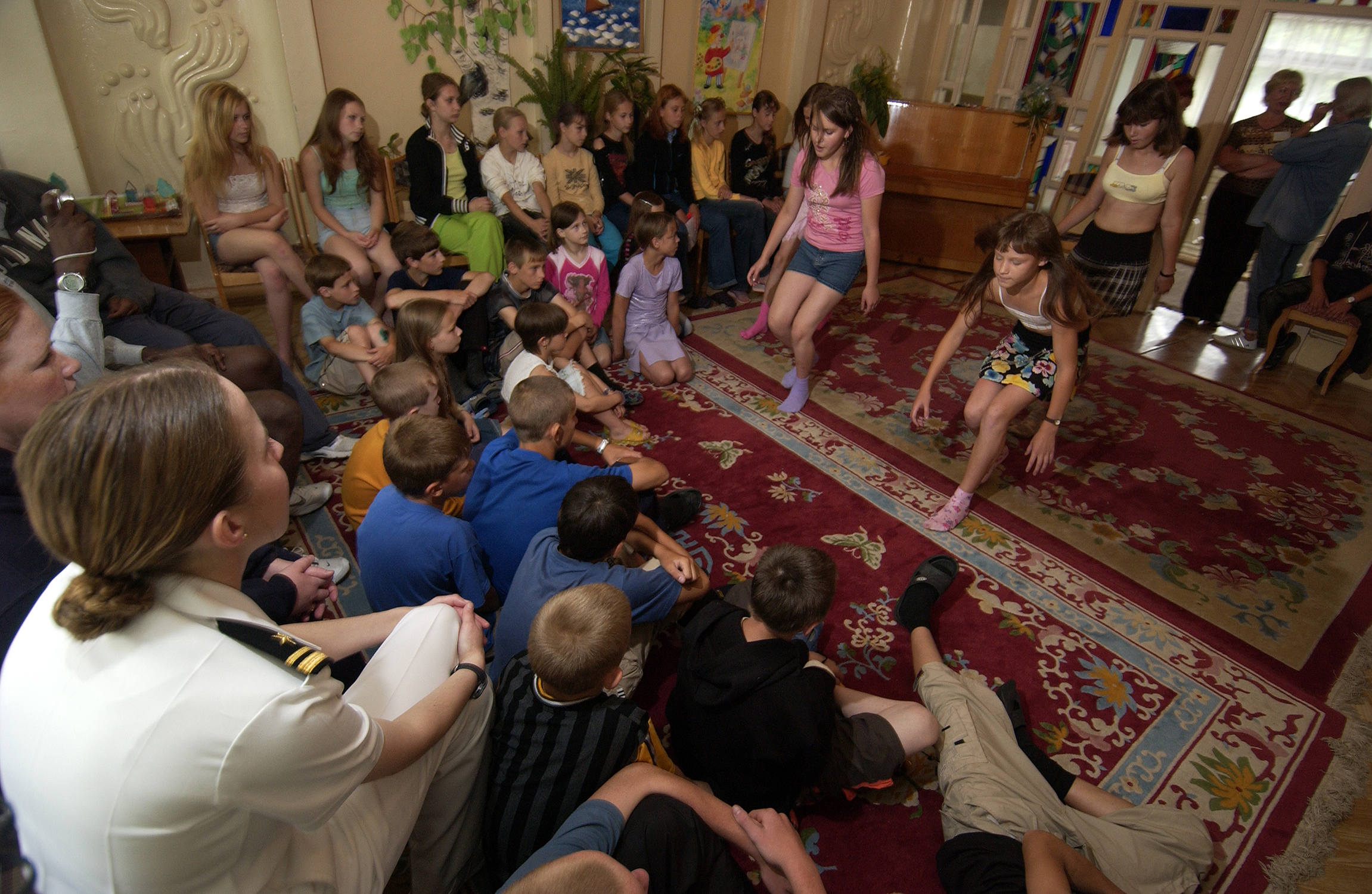
Orphanage in Vladivostok

As of 2011 from the numbers presented from Russia at the UN states that, Russia has over 650,000 children who are registered orphans, 70% of which arrived in the orphanages in the 1990s. Of these, 370,000 are in state-run institutions while the others are either in foster care or have been adopted. Reports have ranged saying that between 66 and 95% of all of these children are considered social orphans, meaning that one or more of their birth parents are still alive. As of 2023 there were 34,000 orphans in Russia according to Deputy Prime Minister of Russia for Social Policy.

== Historical background ==
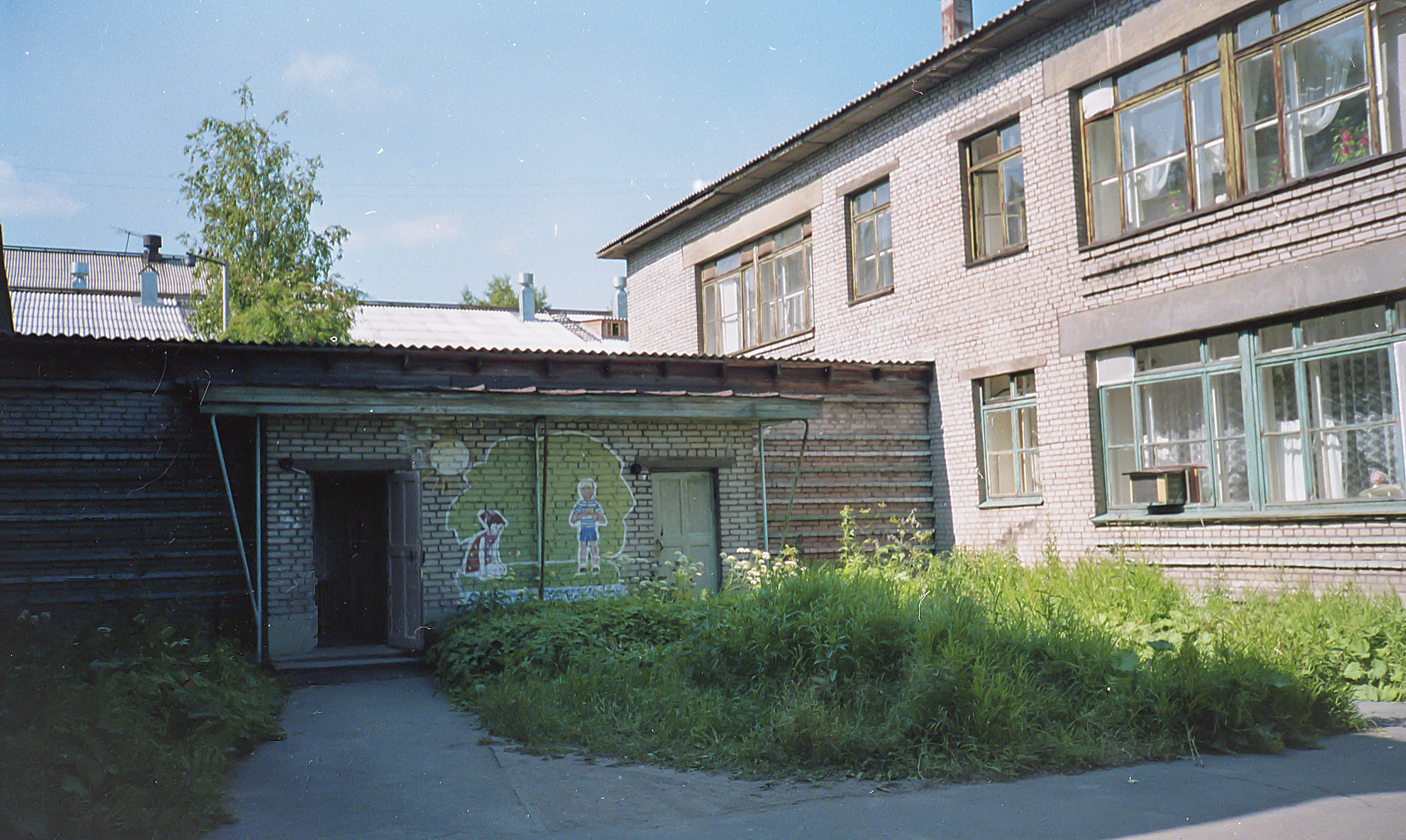
Orphanage in Arkhangelsk, 1994

After the collapse of the Soviet Union, there was an increase in the number of orphans. In 1995, there was a reported 300,000 children in the orphanage system. Although difficult to accurately count, there are an estimated 1 million to 5 million homeless youth. The number of orphanages has increased by 100% between 2002 and 2012 to 2,176. Some of the reasons for children to end up in the orphanages are domestic abuse, parental substance abuse, having lost their parents, or being found alone on the streets.

As for those who are social orphans there are various reasons why they end up in orphanages. For instance one girl's parents were told when she was born that she wouldn't live long so her parents refused to take her. Other children have been abandoned due to reasons such as their disabilities, or their parent's drug or substance problems.

== Conditions in orphanages ==
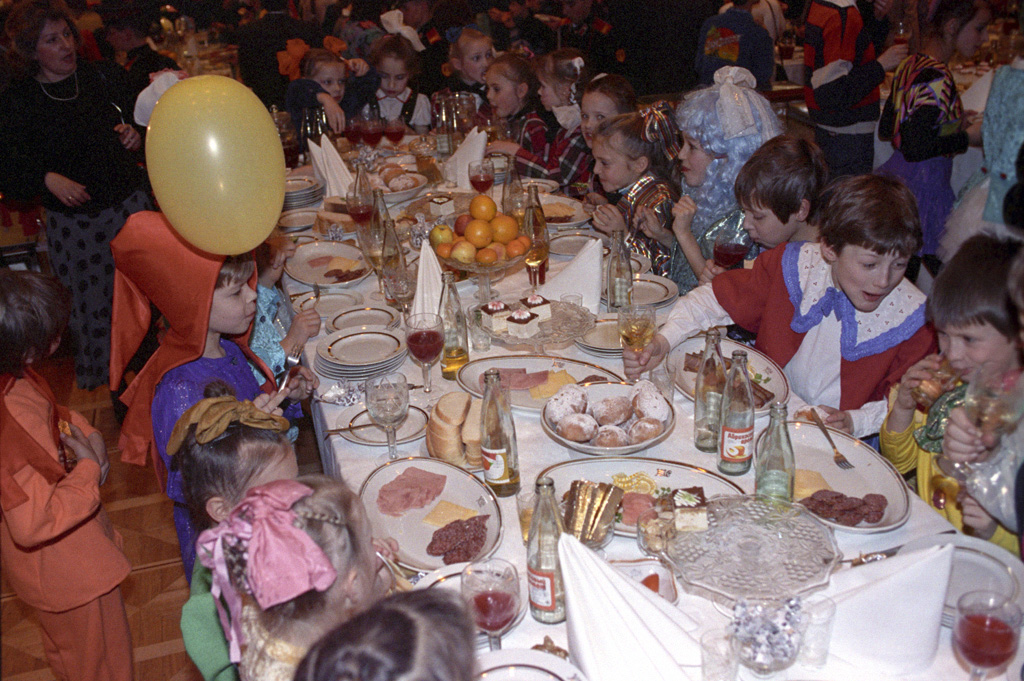
RIAN archive 635660 Orphans and disabled children are celebrating Christmas

There have been reports over the years that the conditions in the orphanages are not providing proper mental and physical care. Researchers have stated that the cognitive development of children in institutions lags behind those of their peers. Children adopted from Russia are also more likely than any other country to have fetal alcohol spectrum disorder. Doctors visiting some of these institutions have even reported seeing toddlers sitting alone, rocking back and forth, staring blankly, or even banging their heads against walls. Children in the 1990s were often not provided with proper nutrition and were not given quality living and sleeping conditions

== Regional differences ==
The situation is the best in Voronezh Oblast and the worst in Jewish Autonomous Oblast and Magadan Oblast.

== Transitions out of state institutions ==
Children are sometimes returned to their orphanage. This is not always due to the wishes of adoptive parents; instead, sometimes children will find it difficult to adjust to living outside of the orphanage and will request to return. In 2011, it was estimated that as many as 4,600 children were returned by their adoptive or foster parents.

In the 1900s, at the age of 16, children have to leave the orphanages. Approximately 15,000 children leave Russian orphanages each year, usually at the age of 16 or 17. They are given housing, benefits, and a stipend, but often are not given sufficient advice or direction on how to transition into the world. The education that they are given is often lacking. Some institutions only provide the children with six grades worth of schooling. This takes away the opportunity to go onto higher education and many will go into vocational schools that only offer a few trades to study. Statistics have shown that of these youth only 4% are admitted to universities, 50% fall into a high-risk category, 40% become involved in crime, 10% commit suicide, 33% stay unemployed, and 20% become homeless.

== Adoption ban ==
On December 28, 2012, Russian President Vladimir Putin approved the Dima Yakovlev Law, prohibiting Russian children from being adopted by American citizens. The law was described by the BBC as "a reaction to the US Magnitsky Act", which blacklisted high-ranking Russian officials.

== Images ==
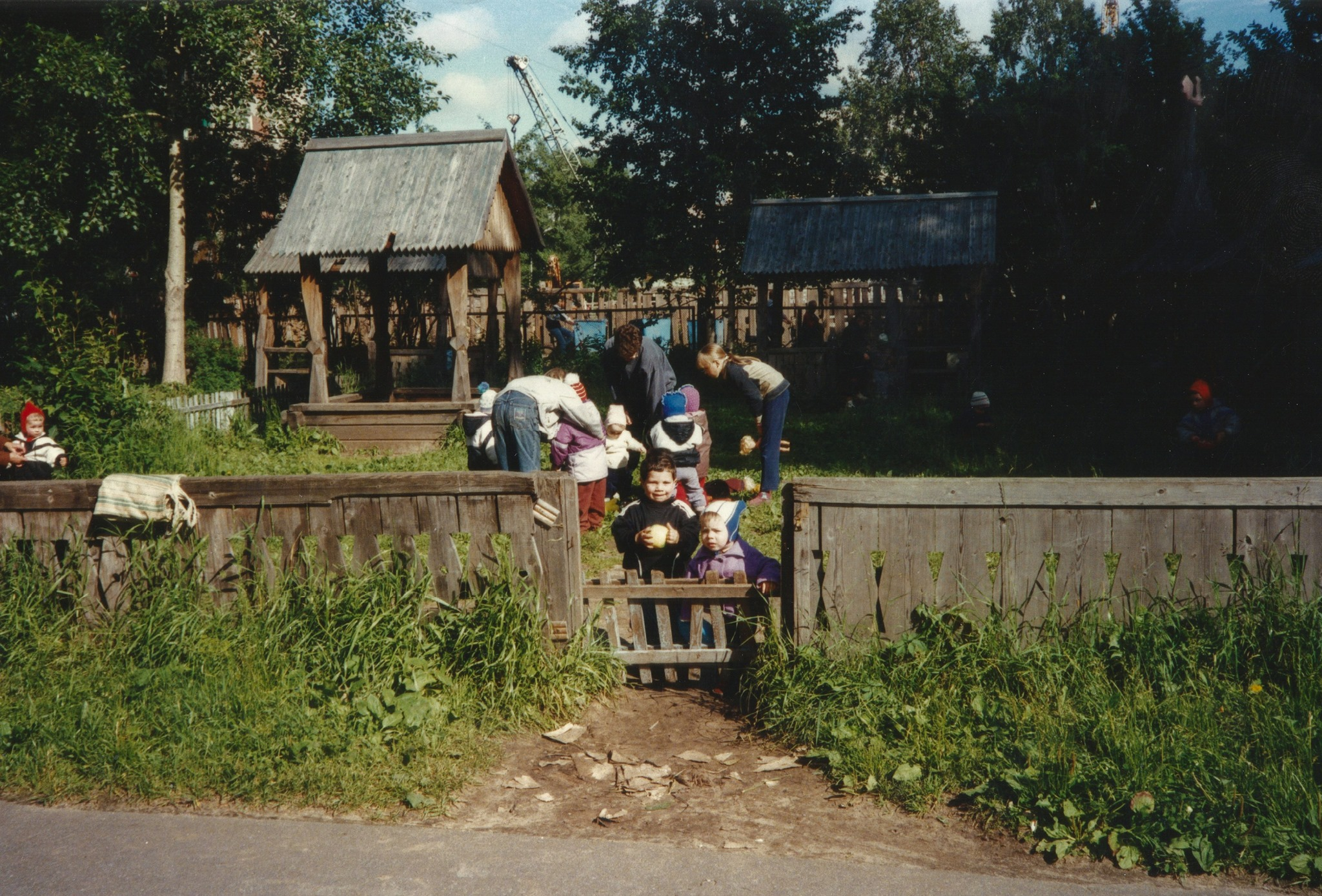
Children outside of orphanage in Arkhangelsk, 1994

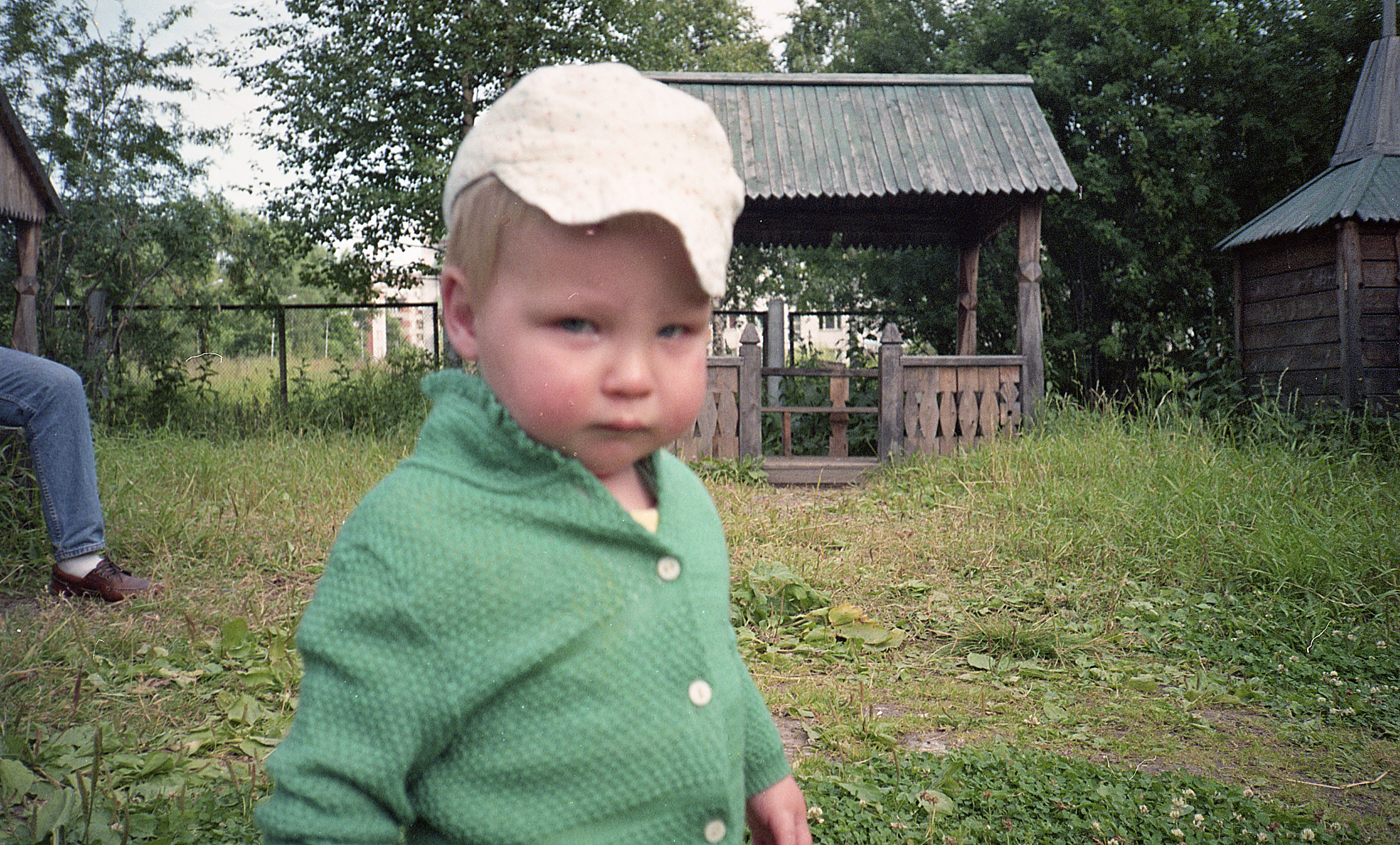
Child outside of orphanage in Arkhangelsk, 1994

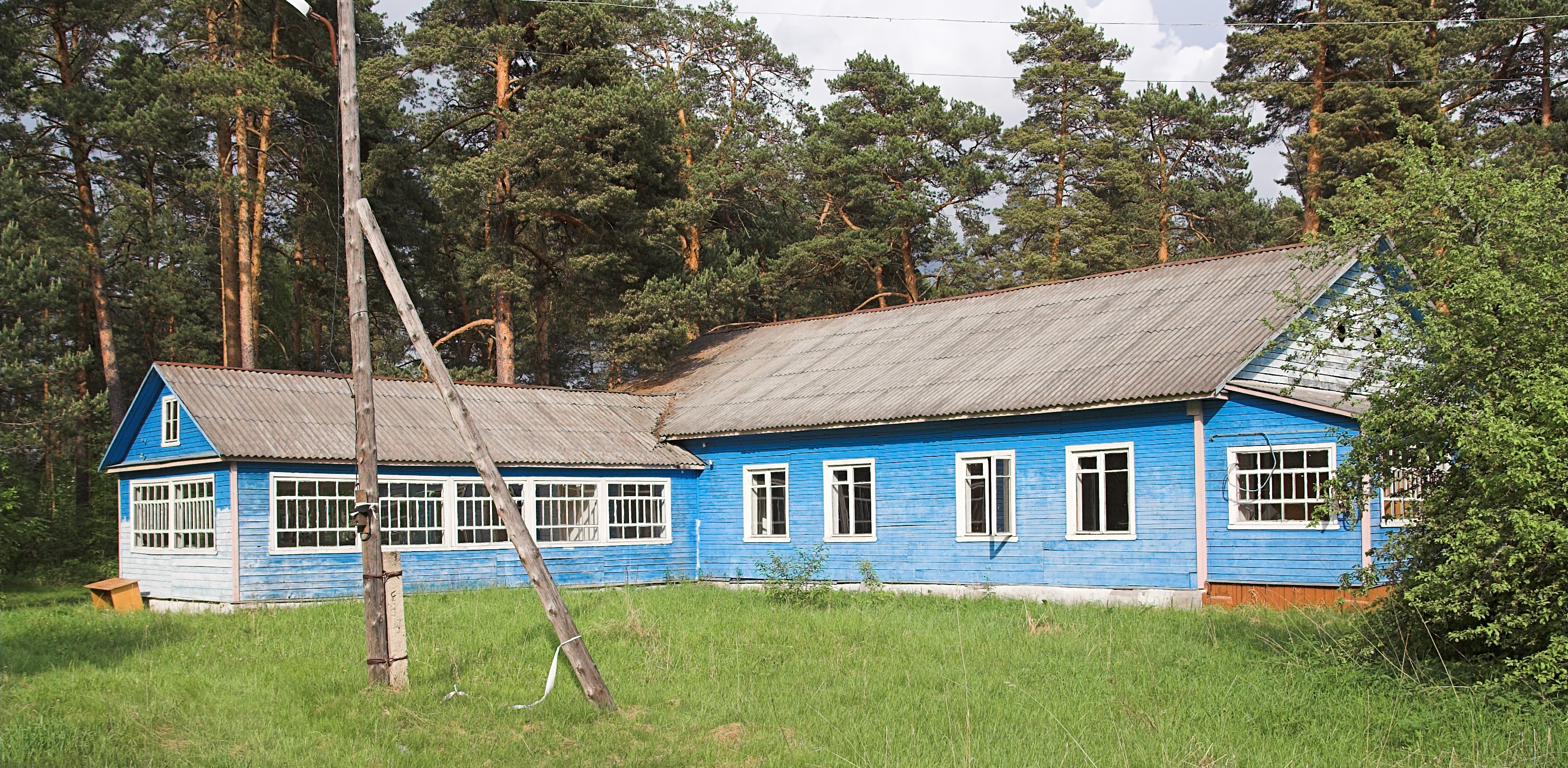
Old orphanage outside of Pereslavl-Zalessky, 2010

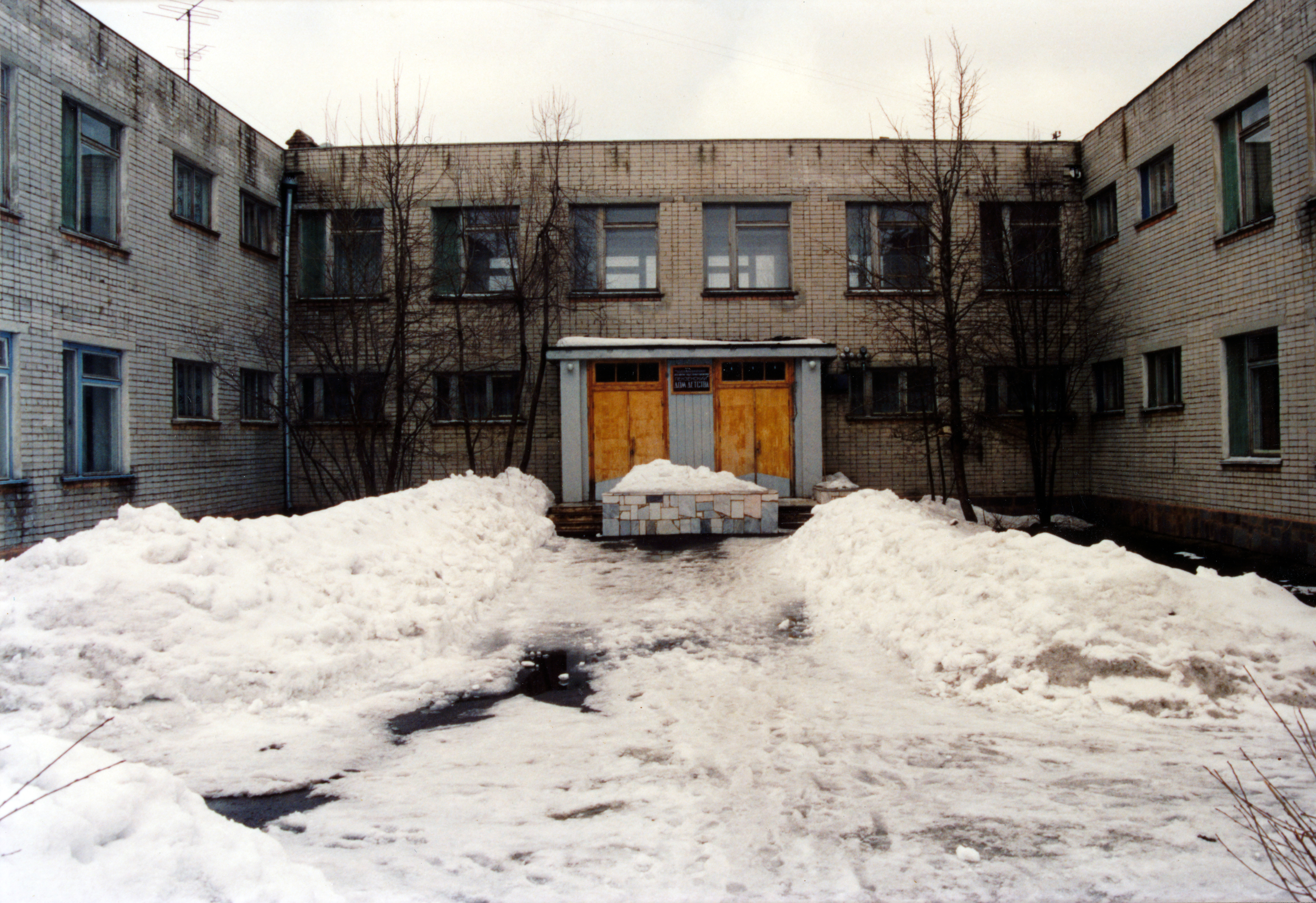
Orphanage in Penza, 2010

== See also ==
- Institutionalization of children with disabilities in Russia
