= Tangzhai, Dangshan County =

Town in Anhui, China

Coordinates: 34°25′52″N 116°35′41″E

Tangzhai Village of Tangzhai Town is a town and village in Dangshan County, Anhui Province, China, which is known for its apple and pear orchards, and for online marketing of its fruit.
