= Social orphan =

Child not being cared for despite having at least one living parent

A social orphan is a child with no adults looking after them, even though one or more parents are still alive. Usually the parents are alcoholics, drug abusers, or simply not interested in the child. It is therefore not the same as an orphan, who has no living parents. The phenomenon is encountered all over the world.

The Convention on the Rights of the Child has brought many countries to reassess their mandate to care for children inside their borders. It thus brought to light various new ways of thinking about international child care.

== Populations ==
In a study of Honduras it was found that 54.3% of children commonly identified as "orphans" were actually social orphans.

| Cause of social orphaning | Percentage of orphans actually social orphans in Honduras |
|---|---|
| Street situation | 19.3% |
| Unemployment | 11.5% |
| Maternal / paternal irresponsibility | 7.4% |
| Extreme poverty | 5.5% |
| Physical abuse | 5.9% |
| Disabilities / disabled | 4.7% |

== See also ==
- Child abandonment
- Orphanage
- Street children
- Orphans in Russia
- Euro-orphan
