= Demographic history of Poland =

The Poles come from different West Slavic tribes living on territories belonging later to Poland in the early Middle Ages.

== Kingdom of Poland (966–1569) ==
Around the year 1000, the population of the Duchy of Poland is estimated at 1,000,000 to 1,250,000. Around 1370 Poland had 2 million inhabitants with a population density of 8.6 per square kilometer. Poland was less affected by the Black Death than Western Europe.

Although the population of the Kingdom of Poland in late Middle Ages consisted mostly of Poles, the influx of other cultures was significant: particularly notable were Jewish and German settlers, who often formed significant minorities or even majorities in urban centers. Sporadically migrants from other places like Scotland, and Netherlands settled in Poland as well. At that time other notable minorities included various incompletely assimilated people from other Slavic tribes (some of whom would eventually merge totally into the Polish people, while others merged into neighboring nations).

Around 1490, the combined population of Poland and Lithuania, in a personal union (the Polish–Lithuanian union) since the Union of Krewo a century before, is estimated at 8 million. An estimate for 1493 gives the combined population of Poland and Lithuania at 7.5 million (including 3.9 million in the Kingdom of Poland), breaking them down by ethnicity at 3.25 million Poles, 3.75 million Ruthenians and 0.5 million Lithuanians. The Ruthenians composed most of the population of the Grand Duchy of Lithuania: this is the reason that the late GDL is often called a Slavic country, alongside Poland, Russia, etc. In time, the adjective "Lithuanian" came to denote a Slav of the Grand Duchy.

Eventually, the Lithuanian speakers came to be known as Samogitians (see also Samogitian nobility), after the province in which they were the dominant majority. Another estimate for the combined population at the beginning of the 16th century gives 7.5 million, roughly split evenly, due to the much larger territory of the Grand Duchy (with about 10-15 people per square km in Poland and 3-5 people per square km in the Grand Duchy, and even less in the south-east Cossack borderlands). By 1500, about 15% of Poland's population lived in urban centers (settlements with over 500 people).

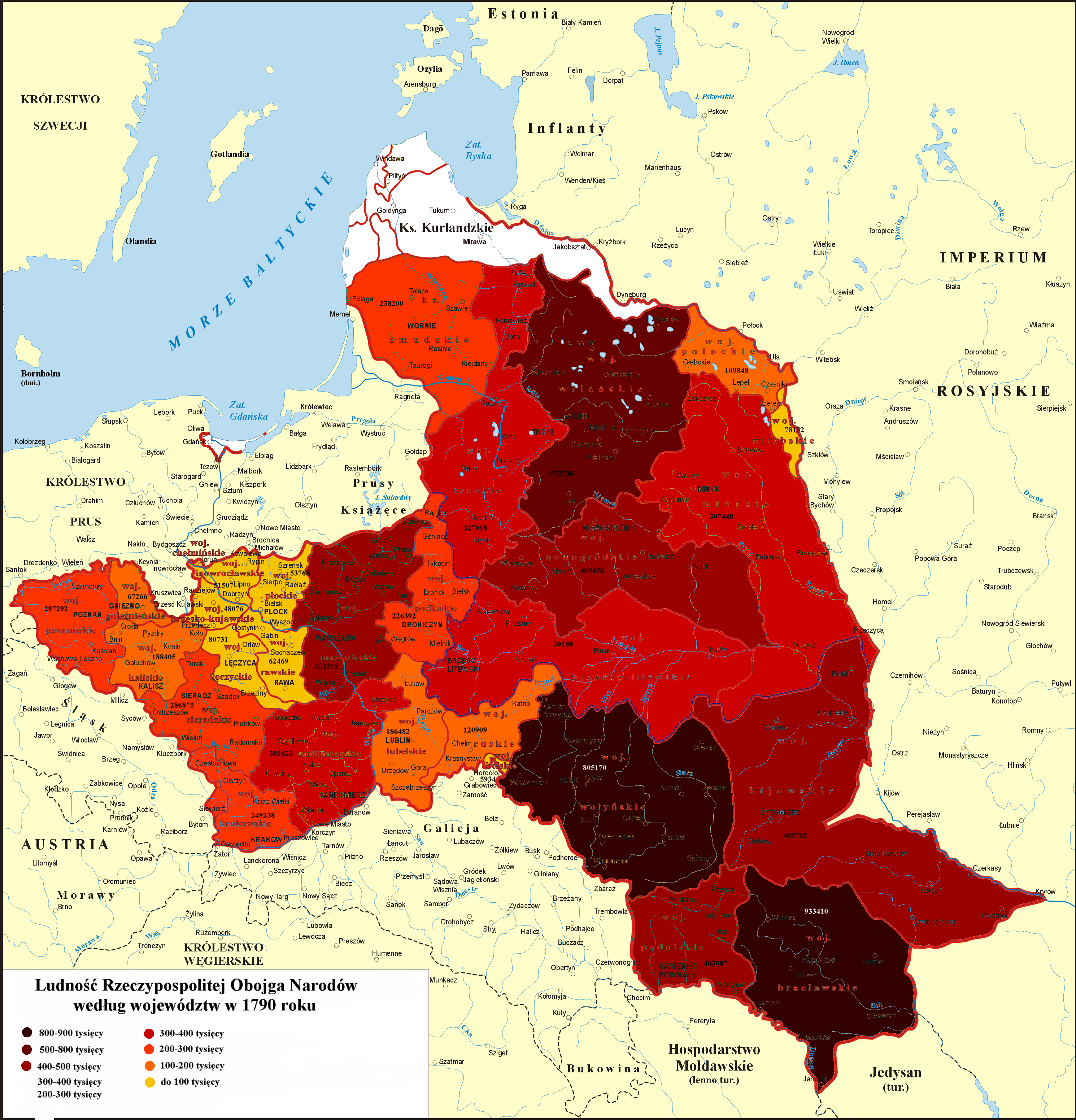
Number of inhabitants of the Polish-Lithuanian Commonwealth per voivodeship in 1790

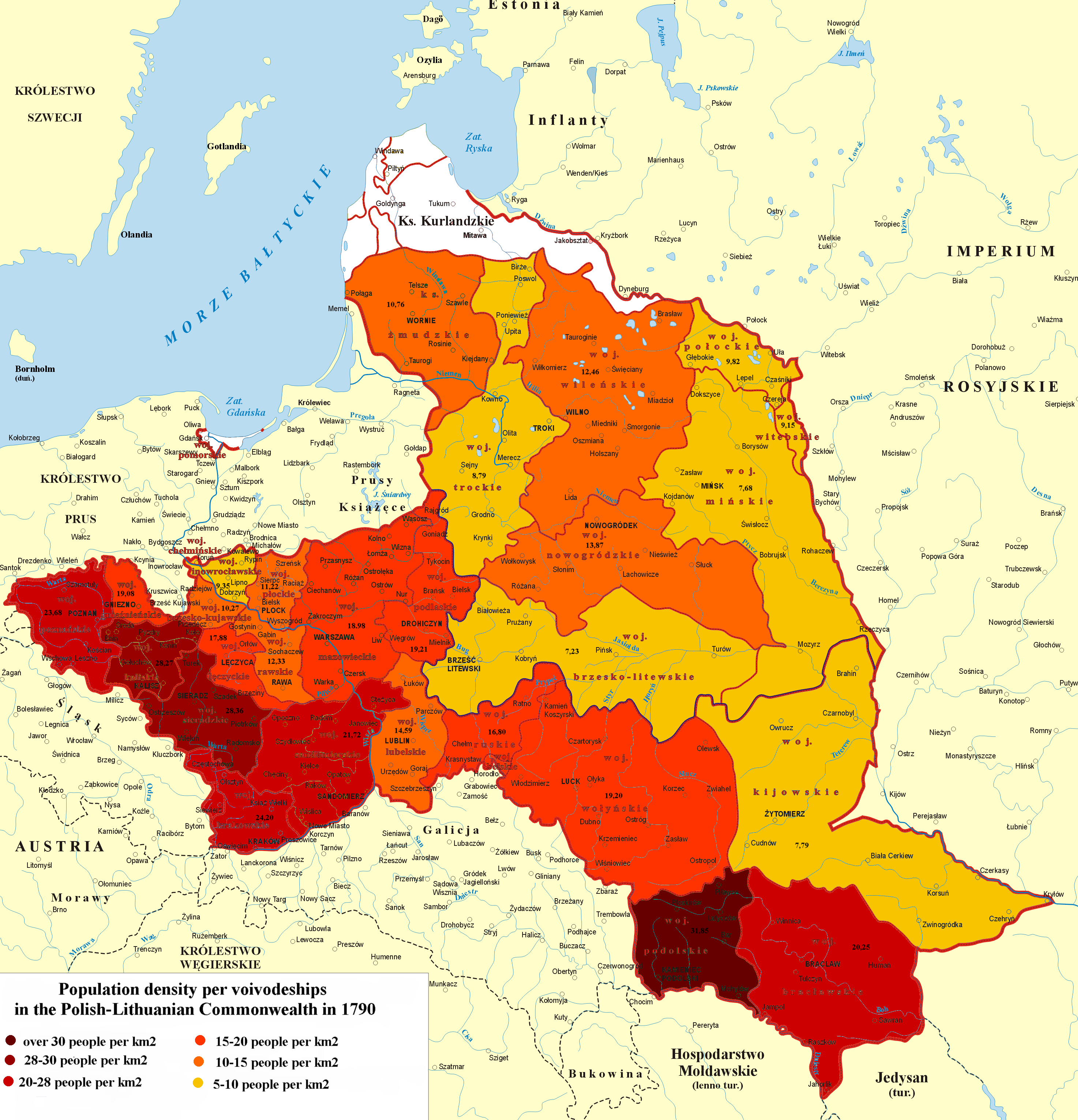
Population density per voivodeships in the Polish-Lithuanian Commonwealth in 1790

== Polish–Lithuanian Commonwealth (1569–1795) ==
By 1600, about 25% of Poland's population lived in urban centers (settlements with over 500 people). Major towns in Poland included: Gdańsk (70,000), Kraków (28,000), Warsaw (20,000-30,000), Poznań (20,000), Lwów (Lviv) (20,000), Elbląg (Elbing) (15,000), Toruń (Thorn) (12,000), Sandomierz (4,000-5,000), Kazimierz Dolny (4,000-5,000) and Gniezno (4,000-5,000).

The population of the Commonwealth of both nations was never overwhelmingly either Roman Catholic or Polish. This resulted from Poland's possession of Ukraine and federation with Lithuania; in both these countries ethnic Poles were a distinct minority. The Commonwealth comprised primarily four nations: Poles, Lithuanians, and Ukrainians and Belarusians (the latter two usually referred to together as Ruthenians), with a considerable amount of the Jews. Shortly after the Union of Lublin (1569), at the turn of the 16th to 17th century, the Commonwealth population was around 7 million, with a rough breakdown of 4.5m Poles, 0.75m Lithuanians, 2m Ruthenians, and 0.7m Jews. In 1618, after the Truce of Deulino the Commonwealth population increased together with its territory, reaching 12 million that could be roughly divided into: Poles – 4.5m, Ukrainians – 3.5m, Belarusians – 1.5m, Lithuanians – 0.75m, Prussians – 0.75m, Jews – 0.5m, Livonians – 0.5m; at that time nobility formed 10% and burghers, 15%. Population losses of 1648–1667 are estimated at 4m. Coupled with further population and territorial losses, by 1717 the Commonwealth population had fallen to 9m: roughly 4.5m Poles, 1.5m Ukrainians, 1.2m Belarusians, 0.8m Lithuanians, 0.5m Jews, 0.5m others The urban population was hit hard, falling to below 10%.

From 1648 to 1660 the Commonwealth lost between 30% and 50% of its population, largely due to the Khmelnytsky Uprising of 1648-1657, the Swedish Deluge, the Polish–Russian War of 1654–1667, and accompanying famines. During the Great Northern War, Poland's population contracted by 25% in 1709–1711.

To be Polish, in the non-Polish lands of the Commonwealth, was then much less an index of ethnicity than of religion and rank; it was a designation largely reserved for the landed noble class (szlachta), which included Poles but also many members of non-Polish origin who converted to Catholicism in increasing numbers with each following generation. For the non-Polish nobility such conversion meant a final step of Polonization that followed the adoption of the Polish language and culture. Poland, as the culturally most advanced part of the Commonwealth, with the royal court, the capital, the largest cities, the second-oldest university in Central Europe (after Prague), and the more liberal and democratic social institutions proved an irresistible magnet for the non-Polish nobility in the Commonwealth.

As a result, in the eastern territories a Polish (or Polonized) aristocracy dominated a peasantry whose great majority was neither Polish nor Roman Catholic. Moreover, the decades of peace brought huge colonization efforts to Ukraine, heightening the tensions among nobles, Jews, Cossacks (traditionally Orthodox), Polish and Ruthenian peasants. The latter, deprived of their native protectors among the Ruthenian nobility, turned for protection to cossacks that facilitated violence that in the end broke the Commonwealth. The tensions were aggravated by conflicts between Eastern Orthodoxy and the Ukrainian Greek Catholic Church following the Union of Brest, overall discrimination of Orthodox religions by dominant Catholicism, and several Cossack uprisings. In the west and north, many cities had sizable German minorities, often belonging to Reformed churches. The Commonwealth had also one of the largest Jewish diasporas in the world.

Until the Reformation, the szlachta were mostly Catholic or Eastern Orthodox. However, many families quickly adopted the Reformed religion. After the Counter-Reformation, when the Roman Catholic Church regained power in Poland, the szlachta became almost exclusively Roman Catholic, despite the fact that Roman Catholicism was not a majority religion (the Roman Catholic and Orthodox churches counted approximately 40% of the population each, while the remaining 20% were Jews and members of various Protestant churches). The Counter-Reformation in Poland, influenced by the Commonwealth tradition of religious tolerance, was based mostly on Jesuit propaganda, and was very peaceful when compared to excesses such as the Thirty Years' War elsewhere in Europe.

In the late 18th century, the first statistical estimates of Commonwealth population appeared. Aleksander Busching estimated the number of Commonwealth population for 8.5 million; Józef Wybicki in 1777 for 5,391,364; Stanisław Staszic in 1785 for 6 million; and Fryderyk Moszyński in 1789 for 7,354,620. Modern estimates tend to be higher; by 1770, on the eve of the partitions, Commonwealth had a population of about 11m-14m, about 10% of that - Jewish. The nobility constituted about 10%, the burghers, about 7-8%.

== Partitions (1795–1918) ==
By the First Partition in 1772, the Polish–Lithuanian Commonwealth lost about 211 000 km^{2} (30% of its territory, amounting at that time to about 733 000 km^{2}), with a population of over four to five million people (about a third of its population of 14 million before the partitions).

After the Second Partition, Commonwealth lost about 307 000 km^{2}, being reduced to 223 000 km^{2}. Only about 4 million people remained in Poland at that time, which makes for a loss of another third of its original population, about a half of the remaining.

After the Third Partition, overall, Austria had gained about 18 percent of the former Commonwealth territory (130,000 km^{2}) and about 32 percent of the population (3.85 million people). Prussia had gained about 20 percent of the former Commonwealth territory 149,000 km^{2}) and about 23 percent of the population (2.6 million people). Russia had gained about 62 percent of the former Commonwealth territory (462,000 km^{2}) and about 45 percent of the population (3.5 million people).

An estimate for 1815 gives 11.5 million Poles, out of which 5m were under Russian control (4 million in Congress Poland and 1 million in the territories incorporated into the Russian Empire), 3.5m in the Prussian partition territories and 3m in the Austrian partition territories.

Congress Poland had a population of about 4.25 million around 1830. In the Russian partition, the Pale of Settlement resulted in resettlement of many Russian Jews to the western fringes of Russian Empire, which now included part of Poland. This further increased the sizable community of Polish Jews. By 1914, about 31 million people inhabited the territories that would become the Second Polish Republic, the First World War saw the population of those territories drop to 26 million.

In the final decades of the 19th century, the Polish-speaking population expanded dramatically – by an estimated 70 to 100 percent – not only due to a very high rate of natural increase, but also due to the voluntary Polonization of non-Poles, a process that occurred particularly in urban areas of Congress Poland and Galicia.

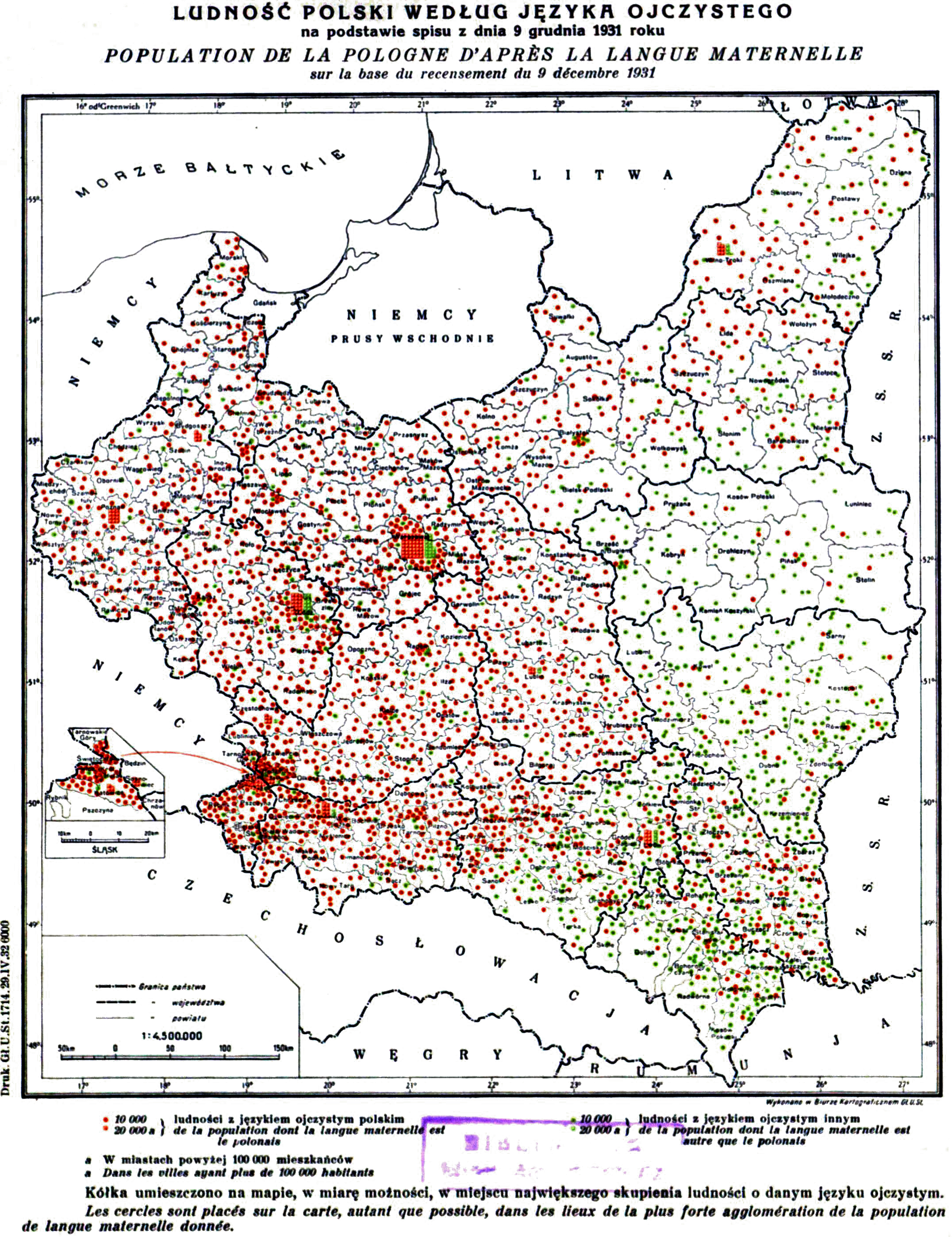
Mother tongue in Poland, based on 1931 census

== Second Polish Republic and World War II (1918–1945) ==
Before World War II, the Polish lands were noted for the variety of their ethnic communities. Following the Polish-Soviet War, a large part of its population belonged to national minorities. The census of that year allocates 30.8% of the population in the minority. In 1931, the population of Poland was 31,916,000, including 15,428,000 males and 16,488,000 females. By January 1939, the population of Poland increased to 35,100,000. This total included 240,000 in Trans-Olza which was under Polish control from October 1938 until August 1939. The population density was 90 persons per square km. In 1921, 24% of the population lived in towns and cities, by 1931 the ratio grew to 27%. Altogether, in 1921, there were 611 towns and cities in the country, by 1931 there were 636 municipalities. The six biggest cities of Poland (as of 1 January 1939) were Warsaw, Łódź, Lwów, Poznań, Kraków and Vilnius (Wilno). In 1931, Poland had the second largest Jewish population in the world, and one-fifth of all Jews resided within Poland's borders (approx. 3,136,000, roughly 10% of the entire Polish population).

According to historian Norman Davies the Polish census of 1931 listed the nationalities by language as Polish, 69% of the population, Ukrainian, 15%, Jews 8.5%, Belarusian, 4.70%, German, 2.2%, Russian 0.25%, Lithuanian, 0.25%, Czech 0.09%, Norman Davies included the Ruthenians with the Ukrainians however the Polish census figures list them as separate group with 3.82% of the population. The classification of the ethnic groups in Poland during the Second Polish Republic is a disputed topic, Tadeusz Piotrowski maintains that the 1931 Polish census "involved questionable methodology, especially the use of mother tongue as an indicator of nationality", noting that it had underestimated the number of non-Poles. The official figures for nationality from the 1931 Polish census based on the mother tongue put the percentage of ethnic Poles at 68.9%, Jews 8.6% and other minority groups 22.5%. Piotrowski cited a study by the Polish historian Jerzy Tomaszewski that puts that the adjusted census figures (taking religious affiliation into account) of ethnic Poles at 64.7%, Jews 9.8% and other minority groups 25.5% of Poland's population. Polish demographer Piotr Eberhardt maintains that it is commonly agreed that the criterion of declared language to classify ethnic groups led to an overestimation of the number of Poles in pre-war Poland. He notes that in general, the numbers declaring a particular language do not mesh with the numbers declaring the corresponding nationality. Members of ethnic minority groups believe that the language criterion led to an overestimation of Poles.

The detailed figures for the census published by the Polish government provided a breakdown by religion for the various language groups, the details of the Polish census of 1931 published by the Central Statistical Office the Polish Republic according to language and religion are as follows.:

Breakdown of Total 1931 Polish Population by Language and Religion

Language	Total	Roman Catholics	Greek Catholics	Eastern Orthodox	Protestant	Other Christian	Jewish	Other
Polish	21,993,444	20,333,333	487,034	497,290	218,993	55,148	371,821	4,410
Ukrainian	3,221,975	12,617	1,676,763	1,501,308	6,705	23,241	255	31
Ruthenian	1,219,647	12,914	1,163,749	38,754	541	2,694	292	84
Belarusian	989,852	77,790	2,303	903,557	519	4,153	200	1,020
Russian	138,713	18,777	908	99,636	5769	34,957	444	105
Lithuanian	83,116	82,723	5	105	200	11	18	1
Czech	38,097	8,984	251	21,672	5,769	1,237	95	2
German	740,992	118,470	284	64	598,944	15,863	6,827	8
Yiddish	2,489,034	-	-	-	-	-	2,487,844	0
Hebrew	243,539	-	-	-	-	-	243,527	0
Local	707,088	1,477	524	696,397	786	7,678	75	42
Other	11,119	6,088	581	1,157	1384	269	454	940
Not Declared	39,163	13,778	3,762	2,544	758	167	2081	107
Total	31,915,779	20,670,051	3,336,164	3,762,484	835,258	145,418	3,113,933	6,750

Figures may not add due to omitted answers and those not practicing or declaring a religion. Source: Polish Main Statistical Office (1931)

Breakdown of Total 1931 Polish Population by Language and Religion Figures as % of Total Population

Language	Total	Roman Catholics	Greek Catholics	Eastern Orthodox	Protestant	Other Christian	Jewish	Other
Polish	68.91%	63.71%	1.53%	1.56%	0.69%	0.17%	1.17%	0.01%
Ukrainian	10.10%	0.04%	5.25%	4.70%	0.02%	0.2%	-	-
Ruthenian	3.82%	0.04%	3.65%	0.12%	-	-	-	-
Belarusian	3.10%	0.24%	-	2.83%	-	0.01%	-	-
Russian	0.43%	0.06%	-	0.31%	0.02%	0.2%	0.11%	-
Lithuanian	0.26%	0.26%	-	-	-	-	-	-
Czech	0.12%	0.03%	-	0.07%	0.02%	-	-	-
German	2.32%	0.37%	-	-	1.88%	0.05%	0.02%	-
Yiddish	7.8%	-	-	-	-	-	7.8%	-
Hebrew	0.76%	-	-	-	-	-	0.76%	-
Local	3.10%	-	-	2.18%	-	0.02%	-	-
Other	0.03%	0.02%	-	-	-	-	-	-
Total	100%	64.76%	10.45%	11.79%	2.62%	.46%	9.76%	0.02%

Figures may not add due to omitted answers and those not practicing or declaring a religion. Source: Polish Main Statistical Office (1931)

In the southeast, Ukrainian settlements were present in the regions east of Chełm and in the Carpathians east of Nowy Sącz. The three main native highlander populations were Łemkowie, Bojkowie and Huculi. In all the towns and cities there were large concentrations of Yiddish-speaking Jews. The Polish ethnographic area stretched eastward: in eastern Lithuania, Belarus, and western Ukraine, all of which had a mixed population, Poles predominated not only in the cities but also in numerous rural districts. There were significant Polish minorities in Daugavpils (in Latvia), Minsk (in Belarus), Bucovina (in Romania), and Kyiv (in Ukraine) (see Polish minority in the Soviet Union, Polish Autonomous District).

=== Second World War (1939–1945) ===
See supplements: Occupation of Poland, World War II crimes in Poland, Holocaust in Poland

Population of Poland 1900-2010

In the beginning of the war (September 1939) the territory of Poland was divided between the Nazi Germany and the USSR. By late-1941 following Operation Barbarossa Nazi Germany controlled the entire territory of the former Second Polish Republic, but in 1944-1945 the Red Army's offensive claimed the region for the USSR.

After both occupiers divided the territory of Poland between themselves, they conducted a series of actions aimed at suppression of Polish culture and repression of much of the Polish people. In August 2009 the Polish Institute of National Remembrance (IPN) researchers estimated Poland's dead (including Polish Jews) at between 5.47 and 5.67 million (due to German actions) and 150,000 (due to Soviet), or around 5.62 and 5.82 million total. About 90% of Polish Jews were killed during the Holocaust; many others emigrated in the succeeding years.

Poland's Population Balance (1939–1950)
Description (see: Legend)	Total	Poles	Jews	Germans	Others (Ukrainians/Belarusians)
1. Population 1939 (by Language Spoken)	35,000,000	24,300,000	3,200,000	800,000	6,700,000
2. Natural Increase 1939-1945	1,300,000	1,000,000			300,000
3. Transfer of German Population	(760,000)			(760,000)	
4 A. Deaths Due to German Occupation	(5,670,000)	(2,770,000)	(2,800,000)		(100,000)
4 B. Deaths Due to Soviet Occupation	(150,000)	(150,000)			
5. Population Remaining in the USSR	(7,800,000)	(1,000,000)	(100,000)	0	(6,700,000)
6. Emigration to the West	(480,000)	(280,000)	(200,000)		
7. Population gain Recovered Territories	1,260,000	1,130,000	0	130,000	0
8. Re-Immigration 1946-50	200,000	200,000	0	0	0
9. Natural Increase 1946-1950	2,100,000	2,100,000	0	0	0
10. Population 1950	25,000,000	24,530,000	100,000	170,000	200,000

1. Population 1939: Polish sources allocate the population by the primary language spoken, not by religion. Most Jews spoke Yiddish, however included with the Poles are about 200,000 Polish speaking Jews who are classified with the Polish group. Included with the Poles are 1,300,000 Eastern Orthodox and Greek Catholic adherents who are sometimes classified with the Ukrainian and Belarusian groups.
2. Natural Increase October 1939-December 1945: After the war Polish demographers calculated the estimated natural population growth that occurred during the war.
3. Transfer of German Population: Most of the ethnic German population fled during the war. Many of them were sent to forced labour.. In 1950 only about 40,000 of the pre-war ethnic German group remained in Poland in 1950, most of whom emigrated later in the 1950s. Others were also expelled.
4. War Dead: In August 2009 the Polish Institute of National Remembrance (IPN) put the figure of Poland's dead at between 5,620,000 and 5,820,000. The IPN's figures include 3 million Polish Jews who were murdered in the Holocaust (200,000 included with Polish speakers); as well as Poles killed in 1943-44 during the massacres of Poles in Volhynia. The figures also include 150,000 victims of Soviet repression. Deaths Due to German Occupation
  - Poles: The Institute of National Remembrance (IPN) figure for deaths of Poles due to the German occupation is 2,770,000. This figure includes "Direct War Losses" -543,000; "Murdered in Camps and in Pacification" -506,000; "Deaths in prisons and Camps" 1,146,000; "Deaths outside of prisons and Camps" 473,000; "Murdered in Eastern Regions" 100,000; "Deaths in other countries" 2,000. These figures include about 200,000 Polish speaking Jews who are considered Poles in Polish sources.
  - Jews Polish researchers have determined that the Nazis murdered 1,860,000 Polish Jews in the extermination camps in Poland, plus another 1.0 million Polish Jewish deaths in prisons and ghettos. In addition 970,000 Jews from other nations were murdered in the Nazi extermination camps in Poland.
  In the Polish figures of war dead are included 2.0 million Polish citizens of the Polish areas annexed by the Soviet Union, that were occupied by German Nazi forces after 22 June 1941. Contemporary Russian sources include these losses with Soviet war deaths.
  Deaths Due to Soviet Occupation: The Polish Institute of National Remembrance (IPN) researchers estimated that 150,000 Polish citizens were executed due to Soviet repressions or died during deportations. Since the collapse of the USSR, Polish scholars have been able to do research in the Soviet archives on Polish losses during the Soviet occupation. Andrzej Paczkowski puts the number of Polish deaths at 90–100,000 of the 1.0 million persons deported and 30,000 executed by the Soviets.
5. Population Remaining in the USSR: The number of Poles and Jews who remained in the USSR after the war was estimated at 1.4 million by Polish scholar and historian Krystyna Kersten. Included with the Poles remaining in the USSR are about 700,000 Eastern Orthodox & Greek Catholic adherents who are sometimes classified with the Ukrainian and Belarusian groups.
6. Emigration to the West: Poles and Jews who remained in non communist countries after the war.
7. Population gain Recovered Territories: Germans remaining in Poland after the war in the Recovered Territories. This group included 1,130,000 bi-lingual Polish-German persons who declared their allegiance to Poland. Also remaining in 1950 were 94,000 German nationals, 36,000 Germans from pre-war Danzig and 1,500 ethnic Germans of other nations. Most of this group emigrated to Germany after 1956. The ethnic German population remaining in the 1990s was about 300,000.
8. Reimmigration 1946-50: Poles resident in western Europe before the war, primarily in Germany and France, who returned to Poland after the war.
9. Natural Increase 1946-1950: This is the official Polish government data for births and natural deaths from January 1946 until the census of December 1950.
10. Population December 1950 Per Census: The total population per the December 1950 census was 25 million. A breakdown by ethnic group was not given. However, we can estimate the Jewish population based on the postwar census taken by the Jewish community. Data for the Germans and others who remained in Poland after the war can be estimated using the 1946 Polish census

== Post-Second World War (1945–present) ==
=== Early post-war period ===
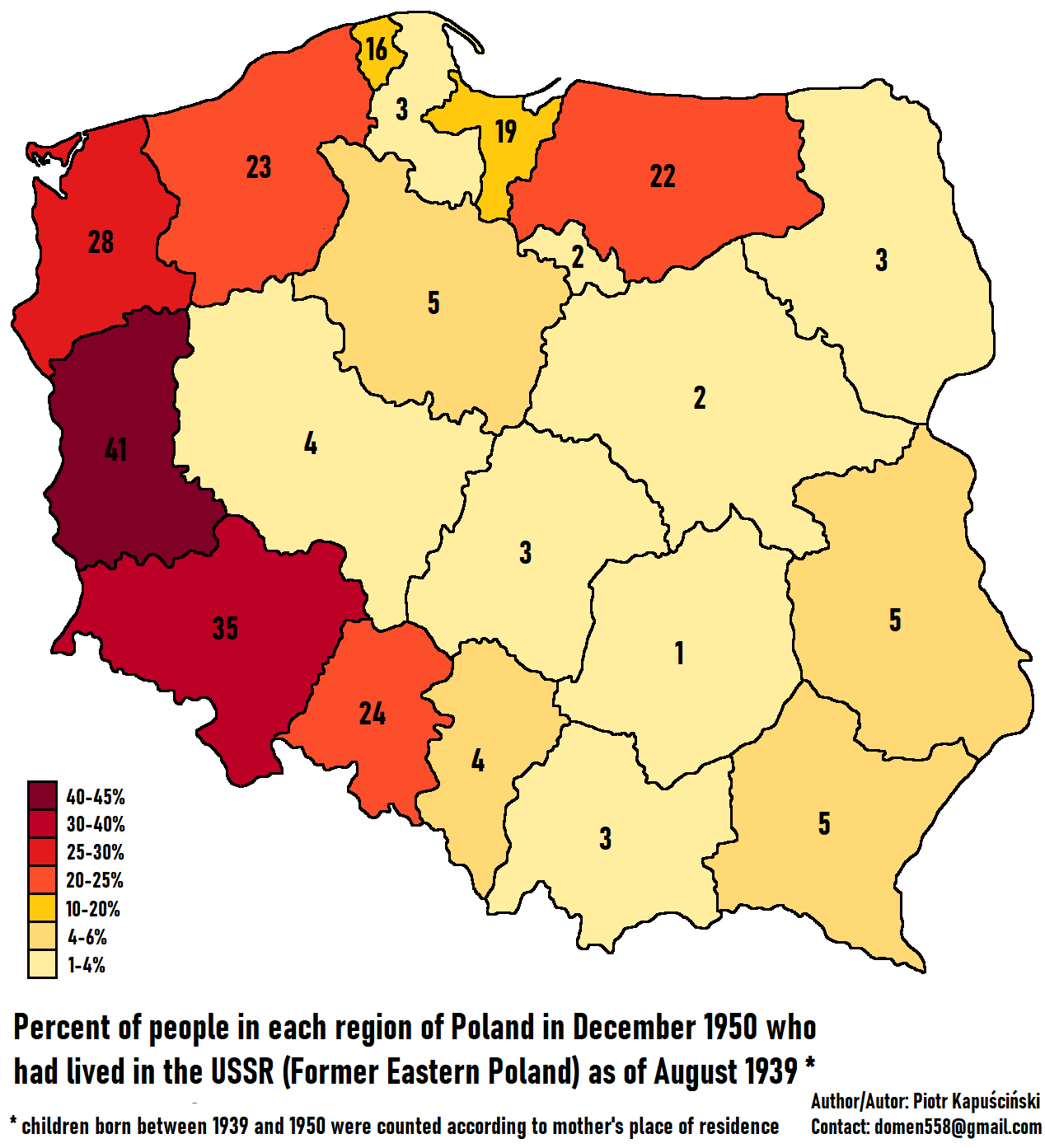
Percent of people in each Polish region in 1950 who had lived in the USSR (Former Eastern Poland) as of August 1939

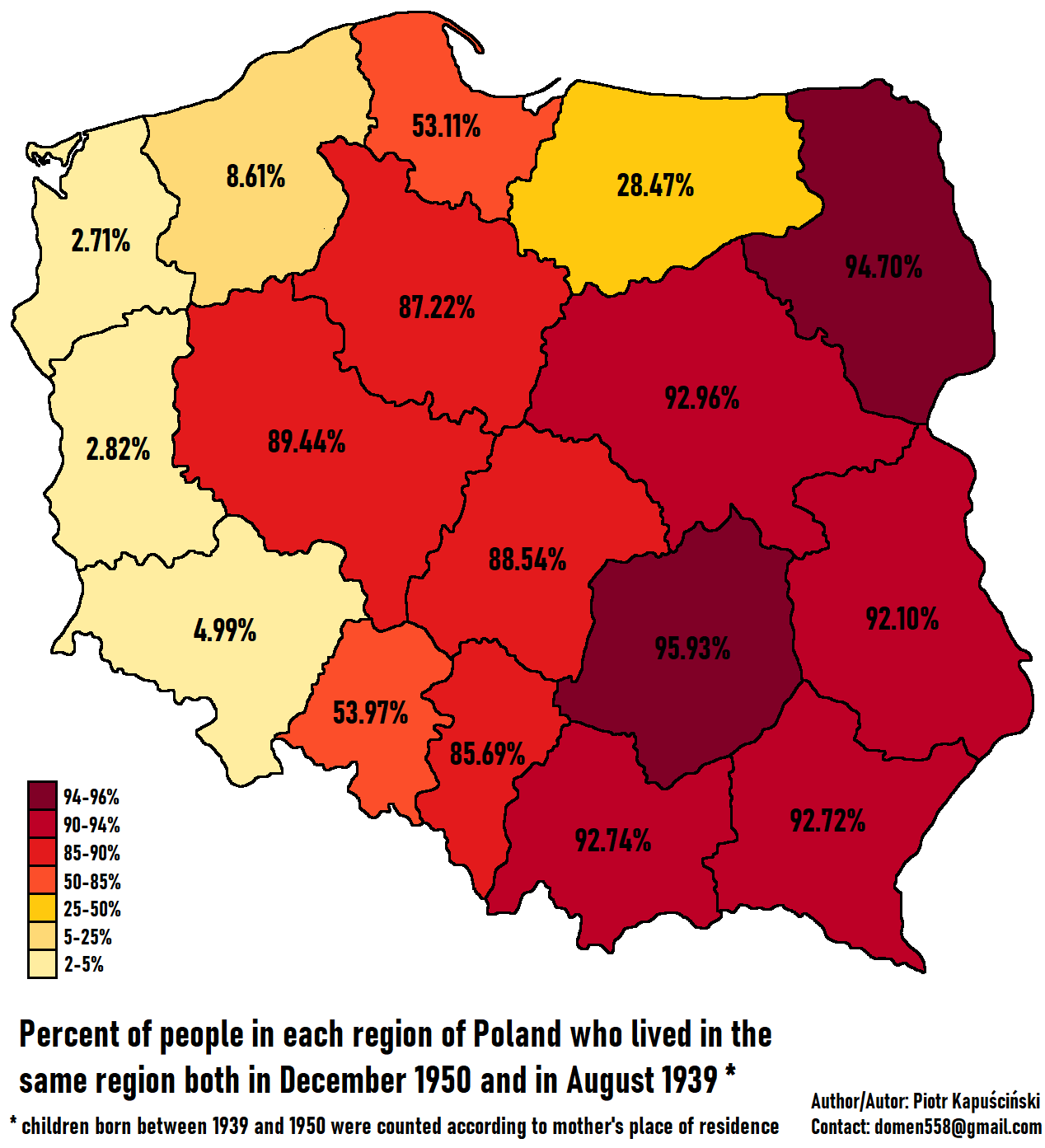
Percent of people in each Polish region who lived in the same region both in December 1950 and in August 1939

Before World War II, a third of Poland's population was composed of ethnic minorities. After the war, however, Poland's minorities were mostly gone, due to the 1945 revision of borders, and the Holocaust. Under the National Repatriation Office (Państwowy Urząd Repatriacyjny), millions of Poles were forced to leave their homes in the eastern Kresy region and settle in the western former German territories. At the same time approximately 5 million remaining Germans (about 8 million had already fled or had been expelled and about 1 million had been killed in 1944–46) were similarly expelled from those territories into the Allied occupation zones. Ukrainian and Belarusian minorities found themselves now mostly within the borders of the Soviet Union; those who opposed this new policy (like the Ukrainian Insurgent Army in the Bieszczady Mountains region) were suppressed by the end of 1947 in the Operation Vistula.

The population of Jews in Poland, which formed the largest Jewish community in pre-war Europe at about 3.3 million people, was all but destroyed by 1945. Approximately 3 million Jews died of starvation in ghettos and labor camps, were slaughtered at the German Nazi extermination camps or by the Einsatzgruppen death squads. Between 40,000 and 100,000 Polish Jews survived the Holocaust in Poland, and another 50,000 to 170,000 were repatriated from the Soviet Union, and 20,000 to 40,000 from Germany and other countries. At its postwar peak, there were 180,000 to 240,000 Jews in Poland, settled mostly in Warsaw, Łódź, Kraków and Wrocław.

Poland's population diminished from 35 million in 1939 to just under 24 million in 1946. According to the national census, which took place on 14 February 1946, the number of inhabitants was 23,930,000, out of which 32% lived in cities and towns, and 68% lived in the countryside. The 1950 census (3 December 1950) showed the population rise to 25,008,179, and the 1960 census (6 December 1960) placed the population of Poland at 29,776,000. In 1950, Warsaw was the biggest city of the country, with population of 804,000. Second was Lodz (pop. 620,000), third Kraków (pop. 344,000), fourth Poznan (pop. 321,000), and fifth Wroclaw (pop. 309,000).

Females were in the majority in the country. In 1931, there were 105.6 women for 100 men. In 1946, the difference grew to 118.5/100, but in subsequent years, number of males grew, and in 1960, the ratio was 106.7/100.

=== Current situation ===
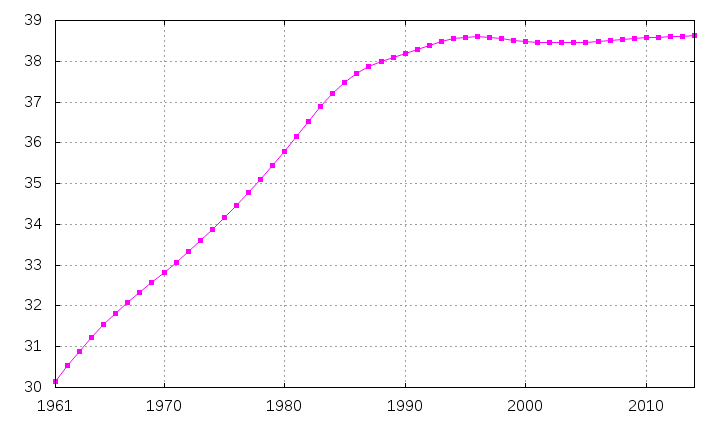
Demographics of Poland, Data of FAO, 1961–2010; Number of inhabitants in millions.

Most Germans were expelled from Poland and the annexed east German territories at the end of the war, while many Ukrainians, Rusyns and Belarusians lived in territories incorporated into the USSR. Small Ukrainian, Belarusian, Slovak, and Lithuanian minorities reside along the borders, and a German minority is concentrated near the southwestern city of Opole and in Masuria. Groups of Ukrainians and Polish Ruthenians also live in western Poland, where they were forcefully resettled by communists.

As a result of the migrations and the Soviet Unions radically altered borders under the rule of Joseph Stalin, the population of Poland became one of the most ethnically homogeneous in the world. Virtually all people in Poland claim Polish nationality, with Polish as their native tongue. Ukrainians resp. Rusyns, the largest minority group, are scattered in various northern districts. Lesser numbers of Belarusians and Lithuanians live in areas adjoining Belarus and Lithuania. The Jewish community, almost entirely Polonized, has been greatly reduced. In Silesia a significant segment of the population, of mixed Polish and German ancestry, tends to declare itself as Polish or German according to political circumstances. Minorities of Germans remain in Pomerania, Silesia, East Prussia, and Lubus.

Small populations of Polish Tatars still exist. Some Polish towns, mainly in northeastern Poland have mosques. Tatars arrived as mercenary soldiers beginning in the late 14th century. The Tatar population reached approximately 100,000 in 1630 but is less than 500 in 2000. See also Islam in Poland.

A recent large migration of Poles took place following Poland's accession to the European Union and opening of the EU's labor market; with an approximate number of 2 million primarily young Poles taking up jobs abroad.

== General statistics ==
Demographics estimates for period before statistics and reliable data collection from censuses should be seen as giving only a rough order of magnitude, not any precise number.

=== Changes of Poland's population through centuries ===
Date	Population	Population density km^{2}	State
2009	38,130,302		Poland
2006	38 125 000	122,0	Poland
2000	38 253 955	122,0	Poland
1995	38 610 000		Poland
1990	38 183 000		Poland
7 XII 1988	37 879 000	121,1	People's Republic of Poland
7 XII 1978	35 061 000	112,2	People's Republic of Poland
8 XII 1970	32 642 000	104,4	People's Republic of Poland
6 XII 1960	29 776 000	95,3	People's Republic of Poland
3 XII 1950	25 008 000	80,0	People's Republic of Poland
14 II 1946	23 930 000	76,6	People's Republic of Poland
31 XII 1938	34 849 000	89,7	Second Polish Republic
9 XII 1931	32 107 000	82,6	Second Polish Republic
30 IX 1921	27 177 000	69,9	Second Polish Republic
1911	21 220 000		Partitioned Poland
1846	11 107 000		Partitioned Poland
c. 1772	14 000 000	19	Polish–Lithuanian Commonwealth
c. 1650	11 000 000		Polish–Lithuanian Commonwealth
c. 1500	7 500 000	15 in Poland; 5 in Grand Duchy	Polish–Lithuanian union
1370	2 500 000	9,3	Kingdom of Poland
1320	1 750 000	8	Kingdom of Poland
c. 1000	1 800 000	7	Kingdom of Poland

Sources: GUS, The World Factbook

=== Urban demographics statistics ===
Changes in the population of major Polish cities.

Note that this table contains information on some cities that are not within the borders of modern Poland, and others that have not been within those borders for many centuries. See Territorial changes of Poland for more details on that issue.

Year /City	Warszawa (Warsaw)	Kraków	Poznań	Wrocław (Breslau)	Gdańsk (Danzig)	Toruń	Szczecin (Stettin)	Lublin	Wilno (Vilnius)	Lwów (Lviv)	Kijów (Kyiv)	Ryga (Riga)	Łódź	Bydgoszcz
1150							7000							
1200							30000							
1242				12000										
1300		14000		14000			6000		20000					
1325				15000										
1329				16000										
1348				22000		10000								
1367					7700									
1378					8500	12000								
1387						13000			30000					
1400		18000		21000			10000		20000					
1430					20000	10000								
1470				21000										
1500	6500	18000 -22000	6500 -20000	21000	30000	8000 -10000			25000	8000				
1525				22000										
1534													650	
1549			22000											
1550	9000			35000					30000					
1564	10000													
1579				34200										
1595	20000	22000	20000		40000					20000				
1600	25000 -35000	26000 -28000	20000 -25000	33000	49000 -70000	12000 -15000	12000		40000	10000 -20000				
1609				37000										
1620	8000													
1622					70000	18000		8400			10500			
1624	48000													
1647											15000			
1650								6025	45000					~5000
1653			21000											
1655			14000											
1662									18500					
1669	14500				12000									
1677									23000					
1700	21000	30000		40000	50000				40000	20000				
1709			12000				11000							
1711				41000										
1727				41000							11000			
1742				41000							20000			
1747				50000										
1750	28000			51000	48000		13000		21000	25000	22000			
1756				55000										
1760	30000													
1766									60000		29000			
1772		15000							21000	30000				700
1775						10000				39000				
1788									23000					
1791		23591												
1792	120000		15000											
1796		22000	16000			6200			17,500		19000		191	
1797			12000											
1798		24500												
1800	75000	25000	19000	65000	41000	18500	6900		25500	42000	19000	29500	428	4691
1802		27000												
1803			16000 -18000			7000				44500				
1811				62504					56300		23000			
1817														6910
1818									33600					
1822									43900					
1824			22000			8500								
1829	140000													
1830	139700								42000				4343	
1831			31000			8600								
1834									52400					
1836									56100					
1839									54700					
1843		42900												
1845						11000					50000			
1846									54200					
1848			42000											
1849			48000	111000	64000	10500	47000		45000	75000				10263
1850	163000	42000	43000	115000	64000		48000		56000	71000		60000	15764	
1851	164000			121000						80000				
1852			44000	121052	67000	11592	52000		65400		56000			12900
1860	158000	50000	43000 -51000						60000	68000			32639	
1870		66000	54400						64200					
1875									82700					
1880			65713	272912	108551	20617	91756							34044
1882	383000													
1885									102900					
1886													232000	
1890	383000	69100	69627 -69900	335186	120338	27018	116228		90000	110000				41399
1895			73200											46400
1897								46301	154500			255879	283206	
1900	593800	85000	110000 -117033	422709	140563	29635	210702	53600	139000	150000			314020	52204
1905			136800										343944	
1909									205200					
1910	781000	143000	156691	512105	170337	46227	236113		181000	196000				57696
1911									238600					
1916									140800					
1917			156400											
1919									128500					
1921	936700	184000	169400			37400		94412	129000	219000			452000	90095
1931	1179500	219000	246700			54280		112539	195071	312000	586000		605467	117528
1939	1289000	259000	275000	629565		80000	287419	122000	209400	318000	846724		672000	143100
1946	478755	299396	268000	170656	117894	68000	72948	99400					496929	134614
1950	822036	343638	320670	308925	194633	80600	178907	116629				482300	620273	162524
1960	1139189	481296	408100	430522	286940	104900	269318	181304					709698	232007
1970	1315648	583444	471900	526000	365600	129900	338000	238500	372100	553500	1631908	731800	762699	282200
1975	1436122	684600	516000	575890	420977	149200	369690	271955				795600	798263	322657
1980	1596073	715707	552900	617687	456707	174400	388322	304424			2191500		835658	348631
1985	1659385	740122	575134	637207	468616	191305	392309	326991	544400		2461000		847864	366424
1990	1655661	750540	590000	643218	465143	202200	413437	351353	597000			909135	848258	381534
1995	1653112	744987	578900	641974	463019	204700	418156	354552	578327			824988	823215	386056
2000	1610471	758715	571600	633857	456574	204300	416485	358933	554281		2615300	764329	793217	375676
2004	1692854	757430	570778	636268	459072	208278	411900	355998	548418			735241	774004	368235
2010	1720398	756183	555614	632996	456967	208278	405606	348450	542828	757600	2786518	705703	730633	364443
2015												698086		

== See also ==
- Demographics of Poland
- Polish diaspora
- Prehistory and protohistory of Poland
