= Migrations from Poland since accession to the European Union =

Emigration from Poland since accession to the European Union
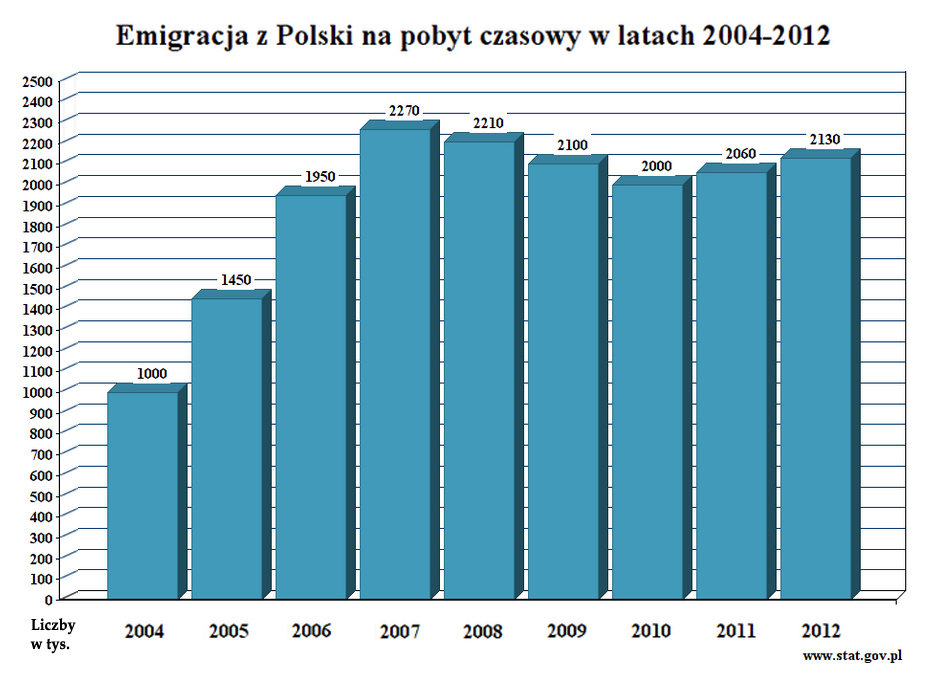
- Emigration (in thousands) from Poland in 2004-2012 after Poland's accession to the European Union, according to Central Statistical Office, 2013.

Since Poland's accession to the European Union in 2004, migration to and from the country has been in flux. Following accession to the Schengen Area in particular, a significant number of Poles, estimated at over two million, have emigrated, primarily to the United Kingdom, Germany, France and Ireland. The majority of them, according to the Central Statistical Office of Poland, left in search of better work opportunities abroad while retaining permanent resident status in Poland itself.

After Poland joined the EU, Poles acquired the right to work in some EU countries, while some of the members implemented transition periods. The UK, Ireland, Sweden and Malta allowed Poles to work freely without any limitations from the start. Peaking in 2007, almost 2.3 million Poles lived abroad, mostly in Western Europe. This has been the largest wave of economic migration of Poles abroad since the Polish emigration to the United States in late 19th and early 20th century, which is estimated to have brought between about 1.5 million, and 3.5 million Poles to the United States.

== Numbers of Polish people ==
Emigration of Poles, relatively modest in the first decade or so after the fall of communism in 1989, increased significantly in the late 1990s, with the share of emigrants in the overall Polish population growing from 0.5% (~100,000) in 1998 to 2.3% (~600,000) in 2008. The percentage of young people attending university has also increased dramatically since 1989 resulting in a 'brain overflow' by the time Poland joined the European Union in 2004. The number of young adults speaking English doubled in the decade between 1996 and 2008.

Since the opening of the labour market following Poland joining the European Union in 2004, Poland experienced a mass migration of over 2 million abroad. As of 2011, 52 out of 1,000 Polish citizens have lived outside the country; estimated at 2.2 million by the Polish Central Statistics Office (GUS), and 2.6–2.7 million by the journalists. GUS statistics estimate that the number of long term Polish immigrants abroad have risen from 0.7 million in 2002 to a peak number of almost 2.3 million in 2007, and has since declined to 2 million by 2010–11. It has remained relatively stable at that level for a short period, following the uncertainty of Global Recession of 2007–08, By December 2015, 12% of Polish labor population left for UK to work there.

According to a 2013 survey, approximately 14% percent of adult Poles have worked abroad since 2004 (approximately a quarter for over a year); 69% have a family member of a close friend who lives abroad, and approximately 24% are open to immigration. Majority of Polish migrants or those considering leaving are young; according to a 2014 survey approximately 90% of Poles under 34 have considered some form of migration. Over the past decade or so, there has been a visible trend that migrants are increasingly likely to be young and well-educated.

Polish-born people in employment in the UK, 2003–2010

According to poll from 2007 for around 29% of Polish emigrants their job abroad is the first job they had in life.

Professor Krystyna Iglicka has estimated that up to half a million Poles emigrated in 2013. As of 2011, approximately 80% of Polish emigrants settle in the countries of the European Union. As of 2013, the largest group of modern Polonia can be found in France (750,000), in the United Kingdom (550,000), and followed by that in Germany (425,608),. Significant Polish presence can also be found in Ireland (115,000 as of 2013), in Italy (94,000 as of 2011), and in the Netherlands (103,000 as of 2013). As of 2011, the largest groups of recent Polish emigrants outside EU were those in the United States (243,000) and in Canada (52,000). The number of Poles in Norway, itself not an EU member, has significantly increased recently (from 43,000 in 2011 to 71,000 as of 2013).

Different regions of Poland have significantly different emigration patterns; as of 2011 the voivodeships of Poland with the highest number of emigrants were the Opole Voivodeship (10.6%), Podlaskie Voivodeship (9.1%), Podkarpackie Voivodeship (8.4%) and Warmińsko-mazurskie Voivodeship (7.5%), contrasted with much smaller emigration percentage from Mazowieckie Voivodeship (2.8%), Łódzkie Voivodeship (2.9%) and Wielkopolskie Voivodeship (3.1%). Overall, the emigration is higher in the poorer, eastern region of Poland.

== Reasons ==
Primary reasons for the migration are almost always economic in nature. It has disproportionately affected young Poles, in their 20s and 30s. Poland joining the EU allowed young Polish citizens to seek out a variety of jobs outside of Poland at a lower personal expense. Wages for many of these jobs were higher in countries like the United Kingdom, Republic of Ireland, France, Germany, and the Netherlands. Young Poles then had the opportunity to seek out higher wages while simultaneously traveling for the sake of adventure and exploration.

Due to a large increase in the number of Poles attending universities after the fall of communism, the supply of educated workers exceeded the domestic demand and as a result many young Poles migrated to the west. According to a survey conducted in 2011, 33% of those questioned pointed to higher wages as motivation for emigration and 31% to unemployment, with 3% stating professional development and 16% declaring family reasons.

== Impact ==
The high level of migration after 2004 triggered social changes within Polish society. This primarily concerns the composition of the Polish population. Emigrants are primarily young people, which has caused the Polish population to be older on average. As a result, the birth rate is also falling. It has already fallen by 10% and some forecasts assume that it will fall by a further 10% by 2035. In some regions, this is leading to depopulation and the consequent reduction in infrastructure, such as playgrounds and railway lines. The quality of life for the population that is left behind is therefore negatively affected.

Positive consequences of the migration include gains in skills and familiarity with global culture. Estimates also suggest that the emigration raised wages for those workers who stayed behind, contributing about 11% of total wage growth between 1998 and 2007. The migration has also been associated with lowering of unemployment in Poland and remittances of approximately 41 billion euros in the Polish economy.

Migration from Poland has also impacted the relationship between Polish citizens and foreign countries. Since the EU accession, large numbers of Polish citizens have lived in another European country at one time. In most cases, Polish migrants still maintain close contact with people in their home country. Through this contact and the tendency to return to Poland, Polish migrants still contribute to social change within Polish society. During their stay abroad, they are for example confronted with different gender roles in a majority of cases, which can lead to a reflection on their own, possibly more traditional, values. Women are also said to feel more empowered when they emigrate alone, are financially independent abroad, and can make their own decisions about their lives. These values can be imported through contact with their home country or their return. Similar observations have also been made with regard to homosexuals and Muslims. Increased contact with these minorities has led to a reduction in prejudice and increased acceptance. Before the 2015 European migrant crisis, Poles generally felt more positive about EU-related migration. Most Poles were not troubled by the idea of an increase in Islam in Poland or of some intrusion of their culture from those who were immigrating to Poland. Instead, many viewed this type of migration as an opportunity for freedom of movement. These Poles were optimistic that those who emigrated to countries such as Ireland would gain entrepreneurial skills that could help Poland when and if they decided to return.

Polish migration has also led to a general increase in English language proficiency. Many older people decide to learn other languages in order to communicate with family members who grew up abroad and may never have learned to speak Polish fluently.

In Poland, conservative voices are fuelling the debate about the extent to which the emigration of one or possibly both parents has a psychological impact on the children left behind, the so-called Euro-Orphans. These would represent a considerable social problem. It would be possible to observe severe behavioral disorders among the children concerned, such as theft or drug use. As of 2011, however, there were no precise studies that proved such effects on such children.

== Returning migrants and reversal ==
With better economic conditions and Polish salaries at 70% of the EU average in 2016, the emigration trend started to decrease in the 2010s and more workforce is needed in the country, so the Polish Minister of Development Mateusz Morawiecki encouraged Poles abroad to return to Poland.

Since 2015, migration out of Poland has stabilized, and some migrants who had left the country in earlier years have returned. In 2019, the number of Poles living abroad had fallen for the first time since the Great Recession. The number of returning Poles has increased, with returning emigrants surpassing departing citizens from 2019 to 2022. Reasons cited for this phenomenon include improved economic conditions in Poland, a perceived equal/higher standard of living at a more affordable cost, desire to be closer to family, sense of xenophobia in host countries, uncertainty surrounding the COVID-19 pandemic, and individual political events such as Brexit.

== See also ==
- Historical demographics of Poland
- Emigration from Poland to Germany after World War II
- Freedom of movement for workers#Transitional provisions in new member states
- Poles
- Swedish Poles
- Polish diaspora
