= Tadeusz Piotrowski (sociologist) =

Polish-American sociologist and author

- Born: 10 February 1940 (age 86); Poland
- Citizenship: American
- Occupations: Writer, academic
- Writing career
- Genre: World War II history

Tadeusz Piotrowski or Thaddeus Piotrowski (born 10 February 1940) is a Polish-American sociologist and author.

He is a professor of sociology in the Social Science Division of the University of New Hampshire at Manchester, in Manchester, New Hampshire.

== Early life and education ==
Born in the Volhynia region of occupied Poland, Piotrowski emigrated with his family in August 1943.

In 1973 he earned his PhD degree in sociology from the University of Pennsylvania.

== Career ==
Piotrowski taught courses at the University of New Hampshire in anthropology and the Holocaust.

== Works ==
=== Poland's Holocaust ===
Poland’s Holocaust: Ethnic Strife, Collaboration with Occupying Forces and Genocide in the Second Republic, 1918–1947, first published in 1998, concerns the topic of Poland's history in the interwar period as well as in World War II, with particular focus on the uneasy relations between various ethnic groups of the Second Polish Republic.

=== Genocide and Rescue in Wolyn ===
Genocide and Rescue in Wolyn, first published in 2000, concerns the topic of massacres of Poles in Volhynia and Eastern Galicia during WWII. Bogdan Musiał, reviewing for Zeitschrift für Ostmitteleuropa-Forschung in 2001, found it to be an unbiased and informative work; however, he noted that there was a lack of engagement with the historical and political context of the events.

=== The Polish Deportees of World War II ===
The Polish Deportees of World War II, first published in 2004, concerns the topic of mass deportations of Poles following the Soviet invasion and occupation of Eastern Poland in 1939. Anna Jaroszynska-Kirchmann in her review of this book for the Journal of Cold War Studies wrote that the book is "an excellent teaching tool" that "will likely be of great interest" to scholars interested in either modern history of that region or the topic of forced migrations. Gifford Malone, a US diplomat writing in History: Reviews of New Books, found the volume to be a well written and moving account.

== Criticism ==
Piotr Wróbel considers Piotrowski's works to be "highly polemical and controversial", similar to those by Richard C. Lukas and Marek Jan Chodakiewicz. According to Ukrainian historian Andrii Bolianovskyi, Piotrowski's studies on the Ukrainian-Polish ethnic conflicts rely unilaterally on the way they were conceived and presented by Polish right-wing politicians and the underground press during World War II.

== Bibliography ==
Piotrowski's major books include:

- Vengeance of the Swallows: Memoir of a Polish Family's Ordeal Under Soviet Aggression, Ukrainian Ethnic Cleansing and Nazi Enslavement, and Their Emigration to America (1995), McFarland & Company, ISBN 978-0-7864-0001-0
- Poland's Holocaust (1998, 2006), McFarland, ISBN 978-0-7864-2913-4, ISBN 0-7864-0371-3
- Genocide and Rescue in Wolyn (2000, 2009), McFarland, ISBN 978-0-7864-4245-4, ISBN 0-7864-0773-5
- The Indian Heritage of New Hampshire and Northern New England (2002, 2009), McFarland, ISBN 0-7864-4252-2, ISBN 0-7864-1098-1
- The Polish Deportees of World War II (2004, 2008), McFarland, ISBN 978-0-7864-3258-5, ISBN 0-7864-1847-8.

== Awards ==
- 1995: The Cultural Achievement Award from the American Council for Polish Culture for his Vengeance of the Swallows
- 1999: The Literary Award of the Polish Sociocultural Centre of the Polish Library in London
- 2007: Gold Medal Award for "promoting Polish history and culture", bestowed by the American Institute of Polish Culture at the 35th International Polonaise Ball in Miami.
- Interpreter of Perennial Wisdom Award from the Monuments Conservancy of New York
