= Åse Svenheim Drivenes =

Norwegian documentary film director

- Born: 3 January 1977 (age 49)
- Citizenship: Norwegian
- Occupation: documentary film director

Åse Svenheim Drivenes (born 3 January 1977) is a Norwegian documentary film director.

== Life and career ==
Drivenes is from Tromsø. Her twin sister, Erin Drivenes, is a paediatric psychiatrist.

She worked on assignment for Médecins sans frontières in 2008 at Mount Elgon in Kenya, documenting local people's accounts of attacks on civilians, for Atlas Alliansen, a foundation assisting people with disabilities, on Young Voices, documenting young people in Tanzania and Uganda, and as a director for the second season of the Norwegian documentary television series Thaifjord (Et lite stykke Thailand), shown in 2011, about Asian immigrant women married to Norwegian men. She has also worked with Mobilfilmene, a children's film workshop, and together with Tone Andersen started a project to provide children seeking asylum in Norway with the means to make their own films about their experiences.

Since 2017, she has been an associate professor at the Norwegian Film School in the special course on Creative Documentary Directing, which began in 2015.

== Works ==
In 2006, as part of a four-woman collective with Andersen, Anita Larsen, and Kari Anne Moe, called Roger, she made three short films for a project documenting the unsavoury side of life in Oslo: Nattskift ("Night Shift"), which followed a prostitute for a night, Rester ("Leftovers"), and www.anna.no.

=== Vår mann i Kirkenes (2010) ===
Drivenes' solo directorial debut was Vår mann i Kirkenes ("Our Man in Kirkenes"), which premièred at the 2010 Tromsø International Film Festival and was subsequently shown at other film festivals. The film is a commentary on globalisation and outsourcing; its protagonist, Hallgeir Henriksen, is the newspaper Finnmarken's sole employee in small-town Kirkenes, unhappy with the minutiae he must cover, until management brings in a younger journalist and he finds himself even more frustrated.

=== Jeg er Kuba (2014) ===
Jeg er Kuba or I am Kuba, originally titled Around My Family Table, studies the impact on families in poor countries within the European Union when adults leave to work in service jobs in wealthy countries, from the perspective of two Polish children, Kuba and his younger brother Mikołaj. When the film begins, Kuba is 12, Mikołaj is 8, and their father is working in Scotland and their mother in Austria; Kuba objects to the responsibility and the boys later join their mother in Vienna. Drivenes followed the children for two and a half years.

At the 2015 Tromsø International Film Festival, the film won Tromsøpalmen, the prize for the best Nordic short or documentary film. It also won the award for best short or medium-length documentary at Den norske dokumentarfilmfestivalen, best medium-length documentary at Nordic/Docs, Die Grosse Klappe at Doxs!, and the German–Polish Tadeusz-Mazowiecki-Journalistenpreis. It was shown on NRK television in March that year, and provoked discussion of the plight of Euro-orphans, children left alone or with elderly relatives because of the European market in migrant labour; it was also shown on Yle in Finland.

=== Maiko's Dance (2015) ===
Maiko's Dance (also known as Maiko: Dancing Child) is Drivenes' first feature-length documentary. The protagonist is Maiko Nishino, the Japanese-born prima ballerina at the Norwegian National Ballet (her name means 'dancing child'), who decided in her early thirties to have a child and then struggled to return to her top position. Drivenes followed her for four years. The film premièred at the Los Angeles Film Festival and had its Norwegian première at the Bergen International Film Festival; it was subsequently shown on NRK television. Drivenes' production company, Sent & Usent, released two other dance documentaries the same year.

=== Teenage Life Interrupted (2025) ===
Drivenes's 2025 feature-length documentary Teenage Life Interrupted is about teenagers receiving treatment at University Hospital of North Norway by Hans Petter Fundingsrud and Drivenes's sister, Erin Drivenes, for unexplained chronic ailments. Produced by Kari Anne Moe and Gudmundur Gunnarsson of Fuglene AS, it was available to stream on Norwegian television from 13 January 2025 as a 3-part miniseries titled Uten synlige tegn, premièred as a film at the Tromsø International Film Festival on 15 January 2025, where it was awarded the inaugural "Films from the North" prize for a feature-length film, and had its première in cinemas on 19 March 2025. It had its international première at the Copenhagen international Documentary Film Festival and was subsequently shown at several other film festivals: the Reykjavík International Film Festival, the Ji.hlava International Documentary Film Festival, where it received a Special Mention for Best Film, Nordisk Panorama, and the 2026 One World Film Festival.

== Filmography ==
- 2006: Nattskift, Rester, www.anna.no (collaborations; shorts)
- 2010: Vår mann i Kirkenes
- 2013: Jeg er Kuba / I am Kuba
- 2015: Maiko's Dance / Maiko: Dancing Child
- 2025: Teenage Life Interrupted (also a TV miniseries, Uten synlige tegn)
