= Dangshan County =

Coordinates: 34.441°N 116.368°E

Dangshan 砀山县
- County
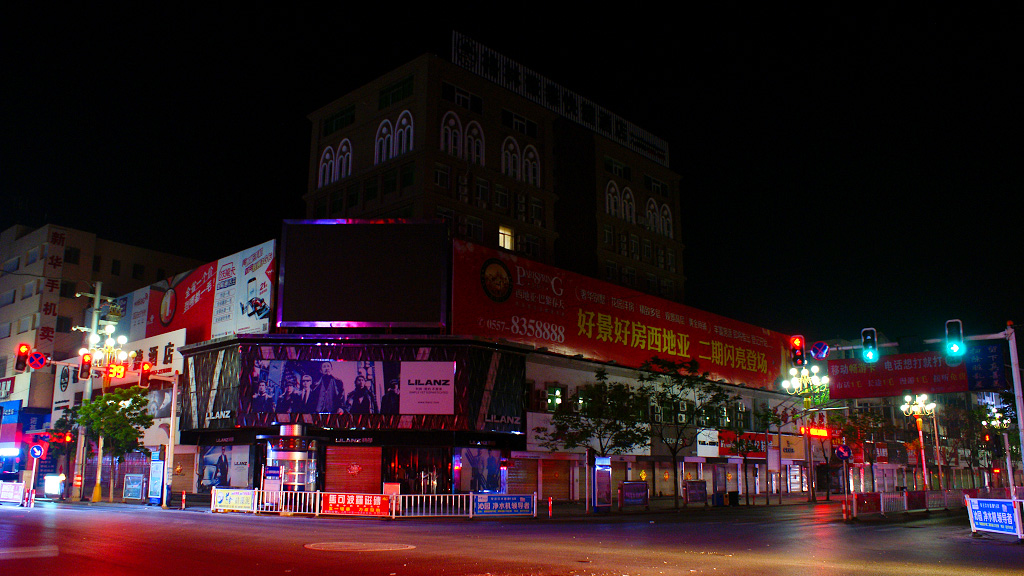
- A nighttime streetscape in Dangshan

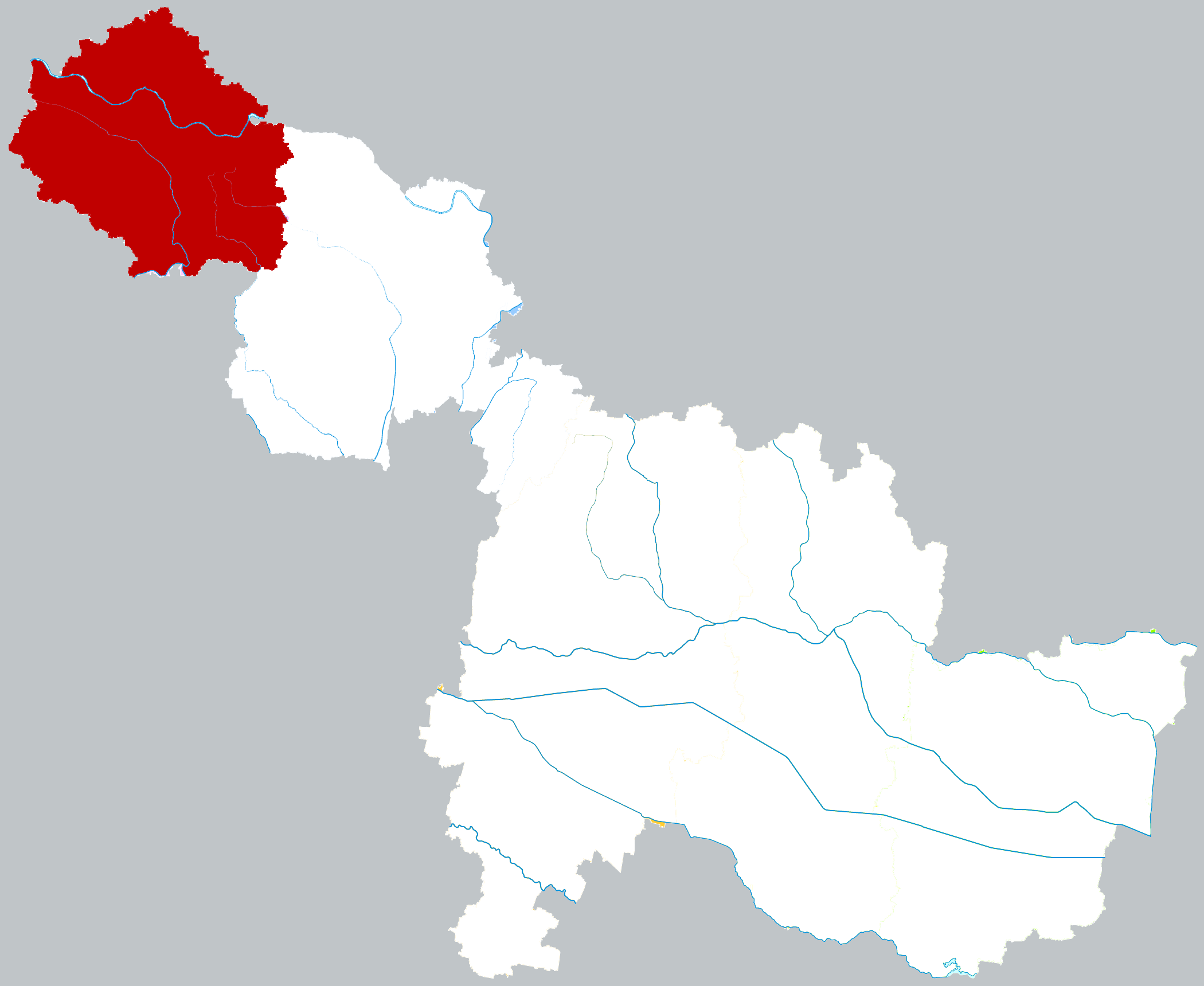
- Location of Dangshan in Suzhou
- Country: People's Republic of China
- Province: Anhui
- Prefecture-level city: Suzhou

Area
  - Total: 1,193 km^{2} (461 sq mi)

Population (2018)
  - Total: 1,002,141
- Time zone: UTC+8 (China Standard)
- Postal code: 235300

Dangshan County (simplified Chinese: 砀山县; traditional Chinese: 碭山縣; pinyin: Dàngshān Xiàn) is a county in the far north of Anhui Province, China. It is under the administration of Suzhou city and is famous for fruits (pear, peach, plum and watermelon).

== Administrative divisions ==
Dangshan County administers 13 towns and 3 other township-level divisions.

=== Towns ===
Dangshan County's 13 towns are as follows:

- Dangcheng (砀城镇)
- Zhaotun (赵屯镇)
- Lizhuang (李庄镇)
- Xuanmiao (玄庙镇)
- Guanzhuangba (官庄坝镇)
- Zhouzhai (周寨镇)
- Caozhuang (曹庄镇)
- Guandimiao (关帝庙镇)
- Liangli (良梨镇)
- Zhulou (朱楼镇)
- Chengzhuang (程庄镇)
- Tangzhai (唐寨镇)
- Geji (葛集镇)

=== Other township-level divisions ===
Dangshan County has the following 3 areas which function as township-level divisions:

- Dangshan Economic Development Zone (砀山经济开发区)
- Dangshan High Speed Railway New Area (砀山高铁新区)
- Xuelou Plate Processing Plant (薛楼板材加工园)

== Climate ==
Climate data for Dangshan, elevation 44 m (144 ft), (1991–2020 normals, extremes 1981–2010)
Month	Jan	Feb	Mar	Apr	May	Jun	Jul	Aug	Sep	Oct	Nov	Dec	Year
Record high °C (°F)	17.1 (62.8)	26.1 (79.0)	28.6 (83.5)	34.0 (93.2)	37.7 (99.9)	38.9 (102.0)	39.6 (103.3)	39.3 (102.7)	36.1 (97.0)	34.7 (94.5)	27.3 (81.1)	20.7 (69.3)	39.6 (103.3)
Mean daily maximum °C (°F)	5.5 (41.9)	9.3 (48.7)	15.1 (59.2)	21.6 (70.9)	26.7 (80.1)	31.0 (87.8)	31.9 (89.4)	30.7 (87.3)	27.0 (80.6)	21.9 (71.4)	14.3 (57.7)	7.6 (45.7)	20.2 (68.4)
Daily mean °C (°F)	0.4 (32.7)	3.8 (38.8)	9.3 (48.7)	15.5 (59.9)	20.8 (69.4)	25.3 (77.5)	27.3 (81.1)	26.1 (79.0)	21.5 (70.7)	15.5 (59.9)	8.5 (47.3)	2.3 (36.1)	14.7 (58.4)
Mean daily minimum °C (°F)	−3.3 (26.1)	−0.4 (31.3)	4.3 (39.7)	10.0 (50.0)	15.4 (59.7)	20.3 (68.5)	23.7 (74.7)	22.7 (72.9)	17.4 (63.3)	10.7 (51.3)	4.1 (39.4)	−1.5 (29.3)	10.3 (50.5)
Record low °C (°F)	−14.4 (6.1)	−13.2 (8.2)	−7.1 (19.2)	−1.5 (29.3)	4.0 (39.2)	11.5 (52.7)	16.2 (61.2)	11.8 (53.2)	7.1 (44.8)	−0.6 (30.9)	−9.4 (15.1)	−14.4 (6.1)	−14.4 (6.1)
Average precipitation mm (inches)	14.6 (0.57)	20.3 (0.80)	27.5 (1.08)	39.3 (1.55)	62.5 (2.46)	95.6 (3.76)	186.8 (7.35)	165.6 (6.52)	69.3 (2.73)	37.3 (1.47)	34.5 (1.36)	14.7 (0.58)	768 (30.23)
Average precipitation days (≥ 0.1 mm)	3.9	4.6	4.7	6.3	7.4	7.1	11.7	10.7	7.9	5.6	5.8	4.0	79.7
Average snowy days	3.5	2.8	1.0	0	0	0	0	0	0	0	0.8	1.6	9.7
Average relative humidity (%)	70	66	63	66	70	70	81	84	80	75	72	70	72
Mean monthly sunshine hours	137.0	143.8	184.2	212.1	225.3	209.9	194.7	184.8	173.5	174.3	151.1	142.0	2,132.7
Percentage possible sunshine	43	46	49	54	52	49	45	45	47	50	49	47	48
Source: China Meteorological Administration

== Economy ==
Dangshan calls itself "China's pear capital", and is home to the 'Dangshan Su' pear variety. Pears and other fruits are canned and juiced, both domestically and for export.

A disabled young woman entrepreneur has increased local pear sales by selling online.

== Transportation ==
The Dangshan South railway station of the Zhengzhou–Xuzhou high-speed railway opened in 2016.
