= Left-behind children in China =

Social phenomenon due to migration

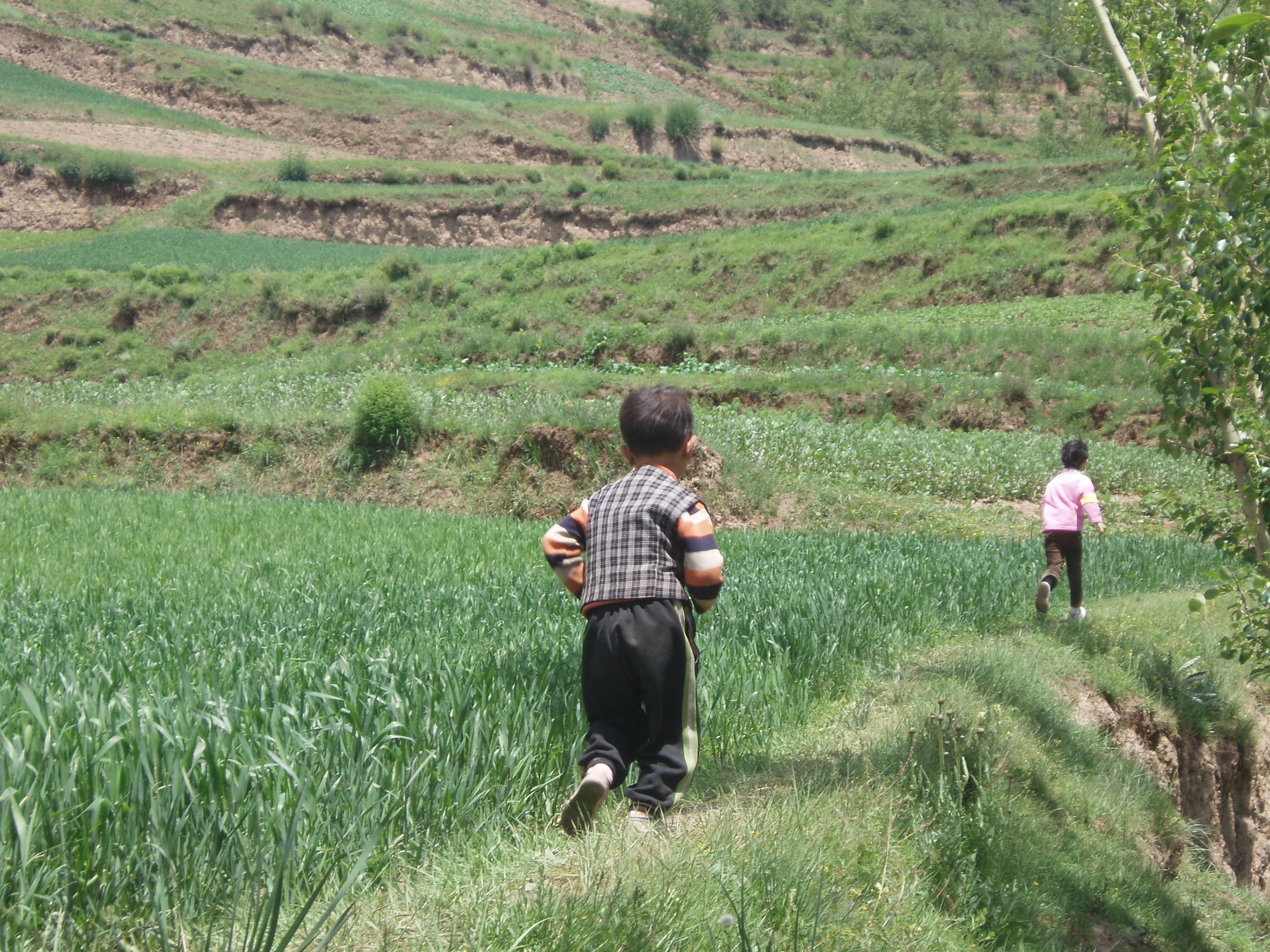
Children running in a wheat field in Datong County, Qinghai.

In China, "left-behind children" (simplified Chinese: 留守儿童; traditional Chinese: 留守兒童; pinyin: liúshǒu'értóng), also called "stay-at-home children", are children who remain in rural regions of the country while their parents leave to work in urban areas. In many cases, these children are taken care of by their extended families, usually by grandparents or family friends, who remain in the rural regions.

Before the 2000s, few mothers questioned the caregiving practice of leaving children in the care of older relatives while they migrated for work prospects. According to the UNICEF 2018 Annual Report, there are approximately 69 million children left behind by one or both of their parents due to migration, which is equivalent to thirty percent of the children in rural areas. The number of left behind children is unevenly distributed across age groups, regions, and gender. The majority of the left-behind children population is located in south and central regions of China. Six south and central provinces, including Sichuan, Anhui, Henan, Guangdong, Hunan, and Jiangxi, take up 52% of the left-behind child population.

Many factors contribute to the increase of left-behind children in China. Internal migration, which mainly involves massive economically driven population shifts from the rural areas to the cities in China, produces a large population of left-behind children and migrant children. China's Hukou system (Chinese Household Registration System) hampers left-behind children's chances of public school enrollment in cities. In some cities where a school enrollment point system are implemented, educational resources in urban areas are not readily accessible to migrants and left-behind children. As a result of the lack of educational resources, many migrant parents left their children at home.

The physical and mental wellbeing of the left-behind children has become one increasing concern for researchers and Chinese government. Some researchers found that the remittance from migrant parents has a positive impact on children's education and human capital. Many of these children face developmental and emotional challenges as a result of the limited interaction with their biological parents. The lack of infrastructure and parental support have led to additional challenges for left-behind children including quality education, physical well-being, and healthy social relationships. Left-behind children are the victims of the longstanding intergenerational reproduction of social inequality.

== Overview of statistics ==
There are approximately 69 million children in China that are left behind by one or both of their parents due to migration, which is equivalent to thirty percent of the children in rural area.

According to the report published by All-China Women's Federation in 2011, among the total population identified as left-behind children, children age 0-5 take up 27.05%, age 6-11 take up 34.85%, and age 12-17 take up 38.11% of the children that are left behind. The male-to-female ratio in left-behind children population is 114:75, with boys comprising 53.63% and girls comprising 46.57% of the population.

Approximately 96% of the left-behind children received or are currently receiving primary and secondary education from 6–14 years old. Approximately 80% of the left-behind children between the age of 15 and 17 are in school, whereas 70% of the rural children population between the age of 15 and 17 are in school. However, it is also argued that according to a different metric, approximately 1/3 of the left-behind children between 15 and 17 left home to work.

The family structure of left-behind children in China varies. According to a report published by National Bureau of Statistics of China, the family structure can be divided into two main categories: (I) Children staying with a single parent due to migration take up 47.14% of the population, within which the father is three times more likely to migrate for work, hence leaving the mother and other family members with the left-behind child. (II) Children staying with neither of the parents take up 52.86% of the population, within which half of the population live with their grandparents. 11.58% of the total left-behind children live by themselves.

== Causes of left-behind children ==
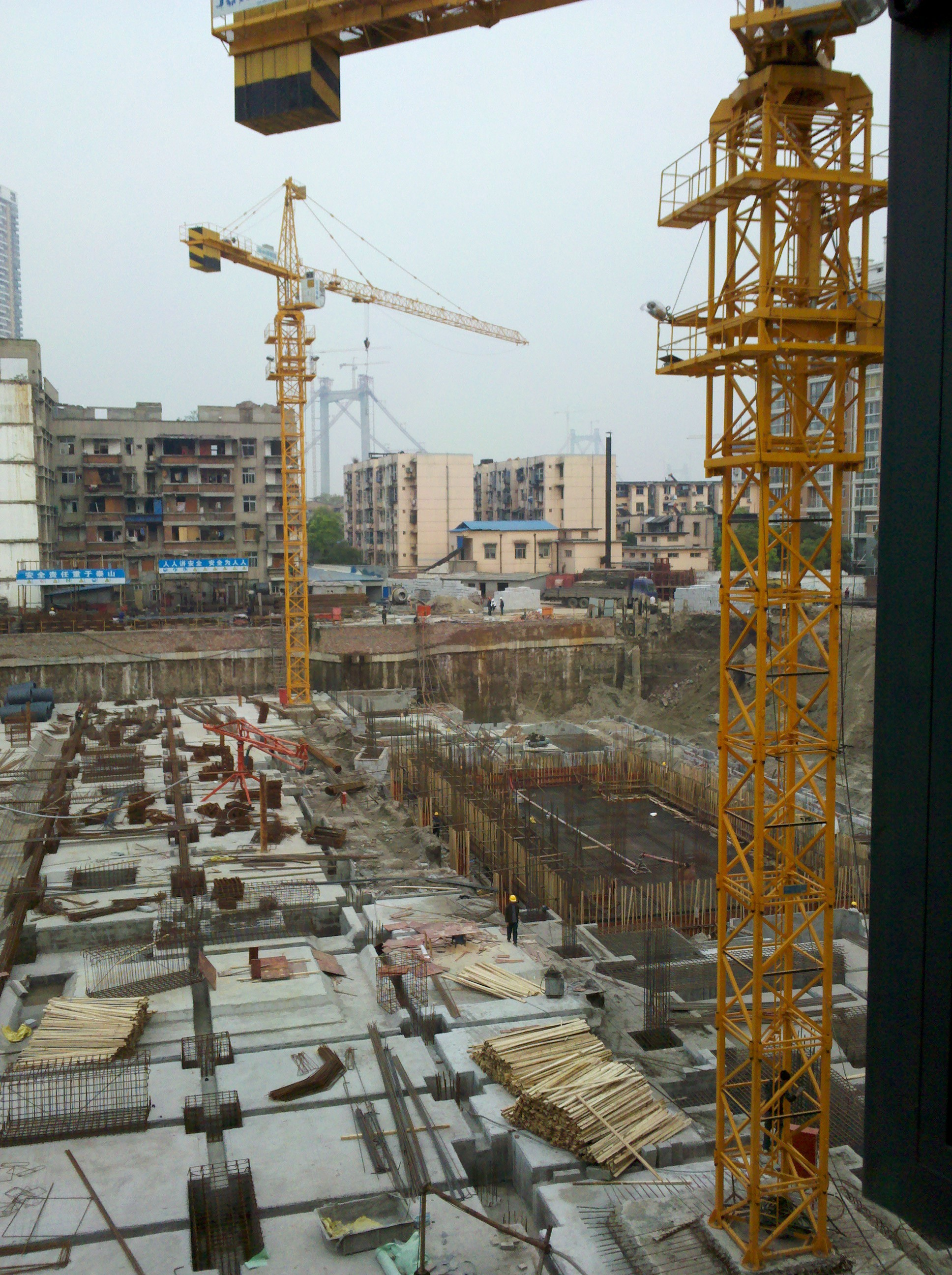
Construction in Hanyang, Wuhan, Hubei, China

=== Urbanization and rural-to-urban migration ===
Since the implementation of the Opening Up and Reform Policy, China has experienced exponential economic development. Despite the significant growth as an entire nation, the unbalanced regional growth has created a polarization between the urban and the rural, the east and the west, and the rich and the poor. The unequal development become one of the main driving force of rural-to-urban migration, such migration works hand-in-hand with urbanization progress. With China's increasing urbanization, more than half of the population lives in urban areas according to the census data collected in 2015. In addition, the conversion of agricultural land for commercial use made agricultural work became less viable and profitable. This prompted a growing number of people to migrate from their hometowns to search for better-paying jobs in urban areas. The income-related and labor-force-related drives to rural-to-urban migration and urbanization prompted the phenomenon of floating children and left-behind children in China.

=== Household registration (hukou) system ===
The Household Registration System is an institution implemented in China which requires its citizens to register and record as residents of a particular area in the unit of family. The system is often considered as an institutionalized mean to create class distinction in China. The system functions as a tool to control and monitor the population and the internal migration. It also serves as the basis for the distribution of public services and resources, which determines what social benefits (education, housing and medical services) a person may receive in a specific region. When residing outside of the place of origin, such benefits and services might not be awarded. Because of the barriers to access educational resources outside of their places of origins, people with high mobility have to either send their children to migrant worker schools or leave their children behind in the rural hometown, causing the increase of the left-behind children in China. Although recent policies have relaxed school admission by banning sponsorship fees in many cities, many problems still remain. In December 2014, the Legislative Affairs Office of the People's Republic of China proposed a reform of the Household Registration System that dismantles it in small cities and towns and the relaxation of control in medium cities.

== Impacts ==
Migration usually has adverse effect on the schooling and wellbeing of left-behind children. The experience of being left behind by migrant parents has various impact on children's mental and physical wellbeing. The severity of negative consequences that might experience by left-behind children in China depend on the child's age, gender, and family economic resources.

=== Intersectionality ===
Children who were left in early stages in life showed lower levels of life satisfaction. According to one research, children left behind at the age of three have emotional issues while children left at the age of nine have decreased in pro-social behaviors.

Gender is another factor that impact the left-behind children's experience. Girls receive more supervision and undertake more care work than boys who are left behind. It is common for caregivers of left-behind children to place more restrictions on girls' social activities than those of boys. The practice is an attempt to protect female children, because females are considered more vulnerable than males in many rural Chinese societies. Additionally, the level of housework required by left-behind female children increases when their parents migrate, replacing male children as the main caretaker of the household.

The difference in family's economic resources also create difference in left-behind children's experience. Difficult economic conditions often result in poor quality care for left-behind children. When caregivers lack the financial resources to afford school fees, nutritious food, and other basic needs, left-behind children are likely to face challenges with well-being. Lower-income households are also more likely to require left-behind children to engage in farm work, resulting in exclusion from social and academic activities.

=== Mental and physical health ===
Approximately 50% of the left-behind children in China go through melancholy and apprehension, in comparison to 30% of their urban peers. Likewise, they are more likely to suffer from mood swings and trauma. Left-behind children exhibits more symptoms of depression and anxiety; stronger sense of feeling abandoned, anguished, suffering, and inferior. They are more likely to exhibit more selfish, indifferent, and introverted mindset.

Due to the various problems associated with being left behind, children are more prone to health problems. Left-behind children generally have a less healthy diet and lower rates of physical activity; lower intake of some nutrients and poorer physical development related to nutrition. Left-behind children are more likely to engage in unhealthy habits and extreme behaviors such as smoking and drinking alcohol. These particular habits have contributed to higher rates of stunted growth and unhealthy body weights.

=== Education ===
Countless left-behind children become reluctant and unenthusiastic to go to school. Many become truants and some of them drop out of school. The children's lackluster attitude towards school restricts their social mobility and keeps them the cycle of poverty. Generally, these children have lower educational goals and are less likely to complete compulsory education. They likewise show consistent low scores on primary school exams which potentially deter chances of a better future.

These children also have difficulties with student-teacher relationships. Additionally, when parents migrate, these children's participation in housework and farming increases, leading to lesser time spent for academic pursuits.

A 2012 study using longitudinal data from the China Health and Nutrition Survey concluded that "parental migration has not given children left behind a significant advantage in educational prospects as their parents had hoped." Adverse educational impacts are especially evident for boys.

=== Social relationships ===
The separation between parents and left-behind children poses a challenge to their social relationships. Left-behind children are more introverted than those who grow up with their parents and are more susceptible to being bullied at school.

=== Safety ===
Left-behind children suffer more major injuries than those who stay with their parents. In 2012, 5 left-behind children died from carbon dioxide inhalation after lighting a fire in rubbish bin for warmth. In 2014, 12 girls were threatened and raped by their school teachers. and in 2015, 4 left-behind children living under domestic violence attempted suicide by drinking pesticide. After the 2015 tragedy, local government officials in Bijie, which has 260,000 left-behind children, issued a request to parents to return home.

The crime rate of left behind children is 70% higher than that of other juveniles.

=== Cell phone addiction ===
Left-behind children spent longer time on mobile games, 19% of these spend over six hours on games, two times more than those who are with their parents. The parents fail to recognize their child's extreme phone use as an issue. To them, phones serve as "babysitters" to calm the children down and stay away from trouble.

== Government and private-sector initiatives ==
=== Education and health ===
To encourage educational parity and provide equal opportunities at the same time assure migrant children's right to acquire essential education, a unified national student registration system has been set up in primary and secondary schools, and procedure for school transfers can now be conducted online. In 2011, a rural school lunch program serving 20 million students daily was implemented. For instances, a school in Zizhou County, Mata School, began offering weekend accommodations for its students to ensure the children have somewhere to stay. In addition, a drop-in children's center in Xichehe was built to serve 200 left-behind children with sponsorship from the China Foundation for Poverty Alleviation (CFPA) and the Sichuan Provincial Communist Youth League. Children's Clubs offering "play and educational activities under the care and supervision of local volunteers" have shown positive outcomes.

Data-driven analysis to determine the most effective interventions in rural education and child welfare is being developed by Peking University and the Chinese Academy of Science's Center for Chinese Agricultural Policy, in Beijing have partnered with Stanford's Rural Education Action Program (REAP). Studies indicated that although rural children had good motor skills, benefited from school lunch programs, and responded to caregiver coaching with their parents, caregiver coaching with their grandparents had little effect. A randomized trial of early childhood development centers in villages in Shaanxi Province is expected to start yielding data in 2018.

Besides government initiatives, private individuals including Jack Ma has called for other entrepreneurs to make increased investments and financial contributions to rural boarding schools in their home provinces.

=== Social support ===
"Guidance on how to make best use of social work professionals in the protection of rural left-behind children" has been jointly issued by the Ministries of Civil Affairs, Education and Finance, the Central Committee of the Communist Youth League and the All-China Women's Federation, for the use of social work professionals who work with rural left-behind children. The tasks defined in the document include:

1. assisting in the rescue and protection work
2. carrying out family education guidance
3. actively providing social care services

The policy aims to

1. strengthen the training and development of professionals
2. actively cultivate and develop social work service institutions
3. promote the construction of social work service stations in villages and towns, and
4. increase the employment of social work professionals in relevant units.

In 2016, the Ministry of Civil Affairs established an office to protect left-behind children. One of the Ministry's has been placement of unsupervised left-behind children in the custody of guardians. Since the campaign commenced in November 2016, 16,000 left-behind children who had dropped out of school have resumed their education, and 177,800 who were previously unregistered have been registered on national household records.

Programs established by the All-China Women's Federation for left-behind children include substitute parent programs, summer camps, and village volunteers.

A national information management system for left-behind children has been launched. The system enables professionals to share data about the child subsistence allowance, impoverished households and people with disabilities. The system now has data on 1.3 million children with disabilities and 110,000 children of impoverished families.

In Southwest China's Guizhou Province, left-behind rural children use smart wristbands with GPS for tracking and protection. The local governments of Bijie city and Qianxinan Buyi, the Miao autonomous prefecture in Guizhou, spent approximately 24 million yuan (3.6 million U.S. dollars) to provide smart wristbands for more than 100,000 left-behind children in primary schools. The wristband has a GPS locator and is linked to local police databases which allows children to report emergencies.

== International comparisons ==
- AIDS orphans, children raised primarily by grandparents, mostly in Africa
- Euro-orphan, children left behind when parents move from one E.U. member state to another for work
- Kinship care, children in the US and Great Britain who are raised by grandparents or other relatives
- Latchkey kid, a child who returns from school to an empty home, or a child who is often left at home alone
