= Foster care in the United States =

System of non-parental care in America

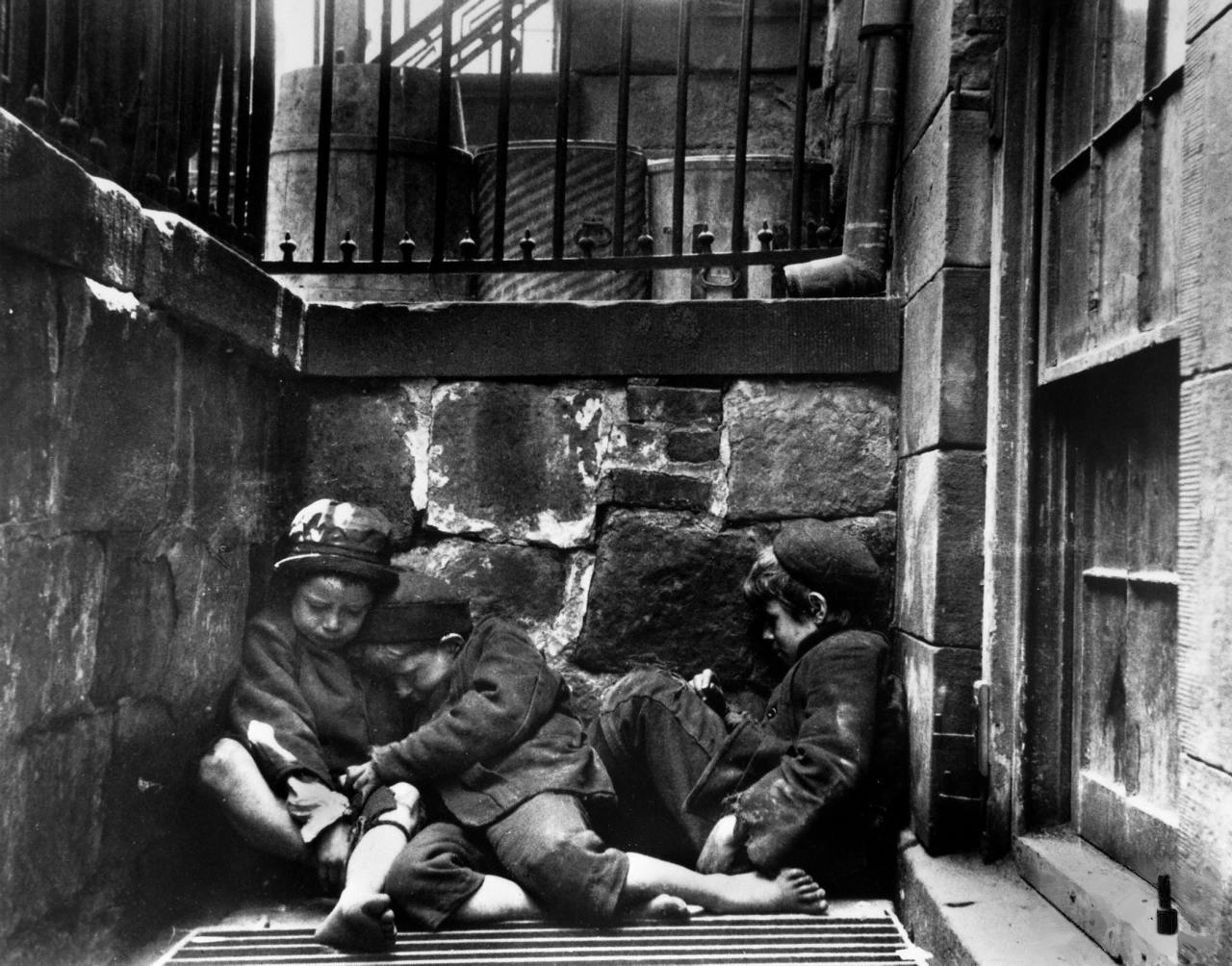
The Children's Aid Society started the Orphan Train Movement in 1853 to help the homeless, abused, and orphaned children living on the streets of New York City; the beginning of the modern-day foster care system in the United States. Jacob Riis' "Street Arabs in Sleeping Quarters 1890." Mulberry Street in Manhattan.

Foster care is the term used for a system in which a minor who has been made a ward or a non-minor, typically aged 18–21, who volunteers for placement, is placed in a relative placement, a non-related extended family (NREFM) placement, a community family home, an institution, or a group home (residential child care community, residential treatment center, etc.). Relative, NREFM, and community caregivers certified by the state are typically referred to as "foster parents," "kin caregivers," "resource parents," or other local terms. The placement of the child is usually arranged through state or county social services. The institution, group home, or caregiver is reimbursed for the expenses related to caring for the child. The state via the family court and child protection agency stand in loco parentis to the minor, making all legal decisions, while the caregiver is responsible for the day-to-day care of the minor. Even while their child is in care, typically birth parents retain education and medical rights and the right to contact with their child unless parental rights are terminated by the Court.

In the United States, foster home licensing requirements vary from state to state but are generally overseen by each state's Department of Child Protective Services or Human Services. In some states, counties have this responsibility, often in coordination with non-profit Foster Family Agencies (FFAs). Each state's services are monitored by the federal Department of Health and Human Services through reviews such as Child and Family Services Reviews, Title IV-E Foster Care Eligibility Reviews, Adoption and Foster Care Analysis and Reporting System, and Statewide Automated Child Welfare Information System Assessment Reviews.

The foster parent licensing process is often similar or simultaneous to the process to become licensed to adopt. It requires preparation classes as well as an application process. The application varies but may include: minimum age; verification that income is sufficient to meet expenses; a criminal record check at local, state, and federal levels, including fingerprinting and ensuring no prior record of violent crimes or child abuse or neglect; a reference from a doctor to ensure that all household members are free from diseases that a child could contract and are in sufficient health to parent a child; and letters of reference from an employer and others who know them.

Another option for placements are Residential Child Care Communities or, in case of severe behavioral or mental challenges, Residential Treatment Centers (RTCs). The focus of treatment in such facilities is often to prepare the child for a return to a foster home, to an adoptive home, or to the birth parents when applicable; however, some children also stay in long-term care. The effectiveness of these facilities is often questioned, but considerable benefits of these types of care have been found as well. There are some children in foster care who may be difficult to place in permanent homes through the normal adoption process. These children are often said to require "special-needs adoption." In this context, "special needs" can include situations where children have specific chronic medical problems, mental health issues, behavioral problems, and/or learning disabilities. In some cases, sibling groups and older children qualify as "special needs." Governments offer a variety of incentives and services to facilitate this class of adoptions.

== History ==
In the latter end of the Civil War era, the use of poor houses and orphanages to house dependent children gradually declined in popularity. An alternative approach, soon called "foster care" (as differentiated from general child protection efforts) was popularized by Charles Loring Brace and his organization, the Children's Aid Society (CAS) in New York. CAS took children off the streets, moved them along state lines, and paired them with families in rural states who pre-selected the children with an order form, specifying age, gender, hair and eye color. This was known as the "Orphan Train Movement," which became credited as the first, systematic placement program ran by a charitable organization. The movement lasted from 1853 to approximately 1929 and transported more than 250,000 orphaned, abandoned, or homeless children. Brace designed this approach based on his personal belief that transforming children into self-reliant members of society rested in an environment that promoted "gainful work, education, and a wholesome family atmosphere."

Unlike earlier permanent child placement, placing out's emphasis on locating homes for children meant that most arrangements did not involve an indenture contract, i.e., the child is not legally obligated to perform work in exchange of food or shelter. The Children's Aid Society also had a policy that placements would be temporary unless the foster parents requested adoption and formal processes were met. This created "a foster care approach that became the basis for the federal Adoption and Safe Families Act of 1997" called Concurrent Planning which requires agencies to work toward family reunification while simultaneously developing an alternative plans for permanent placements. This approach greatly impacted the foster care system.

In 1909, the White House Conference on the Care of Dependent Children bolstered the consensus that de-institutionalization was in the best interest of children. As a response, many orphanages, which were predominantly private, religious organizations, soon reinvented themselves into foster care agencies that maintained their considerable influence and control over the organization, scope, and public funding of child welfare placement services today.

== Statistics ==
Length of time spent in foster care for children exiting care in 2010.
1. < 1 month (13.0%)
2. 1–11 months (33.0%)
3. 12–23 months (24.0%)
4. 24–35 months (12.0%)
5. 3–4 years (10.0%)
6. 5+ years (7.00%)

Preliminary federal estimates counted 343,077 children in foster care on September 30, 2023, a decrease of 6.9 percent from fiscal year 2022; 175,283 children entered foster care during fiscal year 2023, a decrease of 6.1 percent from the previous fiscal year. In 2020, there were 407,493 children in foster care in the country. Based on this number, 45% were in non-relative foster homes, 34% were in relative foster homes, 6% in institutions, 4% in group homes, 4% on trial home visits (where the child returns home while under state supervision), 4% in pre-adoptive homes, 1% had run away, and 2% in supervised independent living. Of the 224,396 children who exited foster care in 2020, 48% were reunited with parents or primary caretakers, 25% were adopted, 10% went to live with a guardian, 9% were emancipated (as minors or by aging out), 6% went to live with another relative, 1% were transferred to another agency, less than 1% ran away, and less than 1% died. Of these children, the median length of time spent in foster care was 15.9 months. 7% were in care for less than 1 month, 22% for 1 to 11 months, 30% for 12 to 23 months, 17% for 24 to 35 months, 11% for 3 to 4 years, and 4% for 5 years or more.

According the National Indian Child Welfare Association, "nationwide American Indian and Native American children are overrepresented in foster care at rates 2.6 times greater than their proportion in the general population."

== Foster care by state ==
=== California ===
With over 60,000 children in foster care in California, the state holds the largest population of foster youth causing overcrowding in group homes, high caseloads for case workers, and disparities in outcomes for children of different racial and ethnic backgrounds. This is over twice as many as the 20,529 foster children in New York, the state with the second largest population of foster youth, had by the end of 2012. Over 30 percent of California foster youth reside in Los Angeles County, amounting to 18,523 children.

Frequent placement changes, lack of supportive relationships, abuse, and neglect within the foster care system all contribute to problematic outcomes such as low school attendance, negative health impacts, and low school and college graduation rates. Foster care youth are at significantly higher risk of experiencing homelessness. After "aging out" of the system at age 18, research has shown that previous foster youth still face difficult instability in their lives. As much as 30 percent of previous foster children are diagnosed with post-traumatic stress disorder. Only about 50 percent graduate from high school and less than 10 percent graduate from college.

Even after being placed in the foster care system, however, these children might not find the kind of care or stability they need. Girls in foster care have been shown to have marginally higher rates of teenage pregnancy than the general population of California. Children in foster care also have to face disproportionately higher rates of mental illnesses as some studies have shown that as much as 47.9 percent of foster care youth showed signs of serious emotional or behavioral issues. A study focused on foster care alumni in Los Angeles County showed that about 65 percent leave foster care without a place to live and 25 percent are incarcerated by age 20. Despite these difficulties, California is working toward easing the transition for foster youth through programs and legislation like the California Fostering Connections to Success Act of 2010, which expanded upon similar federal legislation and increased the age limit for receiving foster care benefits from 18 to 21.

Entering foster care in California

Children can be removed from their homes and placed into the foster care system for a variety of reasons, but in California, 81.2 percent of children were removed because of neglect. In California, sixteen risk factors determine removal. Caregiver arrest history (not convictions), caregivers' parent's history with the child welfare system, caregivers' mental health history, prior abuse and neglect investigations, alleged abuse or neglect, current or past open cases in the child welfare system, prior physical injury from abuse or neglect or substantiated physical abuse are the first eight factors. When abuse is involved in these factors, more points are added in assessing risks of abuse versus neglect. The next four factors focus on the home environment, asking if the housing is unsafe or whether the caregiver and child are homeless, whether domestic violence between caregiver and partner is present, what the primary disciplinary practices of the caregiver are, and does the caregiver use or have a history with substance use. The remaining factors used to determine risk are the number of children involved (more children, more risk), the age of the youngest child (higher risk for children under two years old), and any medical, developmental, or mental health disabilities that will add weight toward removal. Meeting five risk factors may trigger the opening of a case by the Department of Children and Family Services (DCFS) in dependency court, initiating legal proceedings to address concerns regarding the safety and welfare of the children involved. Social workers exercise discretion in assessing the unique circumstances of each case and determining appropriate interventions considering factors such as family dynamics, risk levels, and available support services. Effective collaboration among social workers, attorneys, judges, service providers, and parents is essential for achieving positive outcomes for the children involved.

=== Texas ===
The Texas Department of Family and Protective Services manages foster care in the state. As of 2014, Black children are disproportionately high in the system, even despite an increase of Hispanic children from 2002 to 2013.

=== Maryland ===
After a class action lawsuit was filed in 1984, a federal court ruled that Baltimore had not been ensuring the constitutional rights of its foster children. As a result, the city's foster care program was placed under a consent decree in 1988. The decree remained in place in 2003 when state employee Michelle Lane discovered and made known continued issues with social worker assignments under the program. In 2009, the decree was modified to apply various standards independent of federal or constitutional requirements. As of September 2018, Baltimore City's foster care program remained under court supervision, with an exit requiring full compliance with the consent decree for three six-month reporting periods in a row.

== Foster care legislation since 1990 ==
In 1997, the Adoption and Safe Families Act (ASFA) was passed. This reduced the time children are allowed to remain in foster care before being available for adoption. The new law requires state child welfare agencies to identify cases where "aggravated circumstances" make permanent separation of child from the birth family the best option for the safety and well-being of the child. One of the main components of ASFA is the imposition of stricter time limits on reunification efforts. Proponents of ASFA claimed that before the law was passed, the lack of such legislation was the reason it was common for children to languish in care for years with no permanent living situation identified.

Opponents of ASFA argued that the real reason children languished in foster care was that too many were taken needlessly from their parents in the first place. Since ASFA did not address this, opponents said, it would not accomplish its goals, and would only slow a decline in the foster care population that should have occurred anyway because of a decline in reported child abuse.

Ten years after ASFA became law, the number of children in foster care on any given day was about 7,000 fewer than before ASFA was passed.

Former Georgia Senator Nancy Schaefer was a vocal critic of the corruption that the Adoption and Safe Families Act incentivized in all child protection organizations. She argued that the thousands of dollars in adoption bonuses for every child adopted out rewarded such organizations with seizing children from and thwarting reunification efforts with the children's parents.

The Foster Care Independence Act of 1999 helps foster youth who are aging out of care to achieve self-sufficiency. The U.S. government has also funded the Education and Training Voucher Program in recent years in order to help youth who age out of care to obtain college or vocational training at a free or reduced cost. Chafee and ETV money is administered by each state as they see fit.

The Fostering Connections to Success and Increasing Adoptions Act of 2008 is the most recent piece of major federal legislation addressing the foster care system. This bill extended various benefits and funding for foster children between the age of 18 and 21 and for Native American children in tribal areas. The legislation also strengthens requirements for states in their treatment of siblings and introduces mechanisms to provide financial incentives for guardianship and adoption.

In 2018, the Family First Prevention Services Act was passed as part of the Bipartisan Budget Act of 2018 (HR 1892). In a significant change to funding for child welfare services, it allows states to be reimbursed for evidence-based prevention services, including home visiting, to help more children remain safely at home with their families and avoid needing foster care.

== Constitutional issues ==
In 2021, the Supreme Court heard a case, Fulton v. City of Philadelphia, dealing with discrimination based on the Free Exercise Clause and Establishment Clause of the First Amendment to the Constitution. A faith-based foster care agency was denied a contract with the city of Philadelphia because of its discrimination against same-sex foster couples based on religious beliefs. The city required the Catholic Social Services of the Archdiocese of Philadelphia to certify same-sex couples as foster parents. The Court unanimously ruled, in a narrow decision, that the city of Philadelphia violated the Free Exercise Clause in its refusal to continue working with the agency. The deferential majority opinion, penned by Chief Justice John Roberts, adopted a historical framing that emphasized the Catholic Church's extensive and positive contributions in serving poor, dependent children. Following this holding, scholars have criticized the Court for failing to take into account, or appreciate, the broader history involving faith-based organizations' participation in complicating efforts to provide equal access to children across religious, ethnic, and racial groups.

In May 2007, the United States 9th Circuit Court of Appeals found in ROGERS v. COUNTY OF SAN JOAQUIN, No. 05-16071 that a CPS social worker who removed children from their natural parents into foster care without obtaining judicial authorization, was acting without due process and without exigency (emergency conditions), and therefore violated the 14th Amendment and Title 42 United States Code Section 1983. The Fourteenth Amendment to the United States Constitution says that a state may not make a law that abridges "... the privileges or immunities of citizens of the United States" and no state may "deprive any person of life, liberty, or property, without due process of law; nor deny to any person within its jurisdiction the equal protection of the laws." Title 42 United States Code Section 1983 states that citizens can sue in federal courts any person that acting under a color of law to deprive the citizens of their civil rights under the pretext of a regulation of a state.

In case of Santosky v. Kramer, 455 US 745, the United States Supreme Court reviewed a case when the New York State Department of Social Services (DSS) removed two younger children from their natural parents only because the parents had been found negligent toward their oldest daughter. When the third child was only three days old, DSS transferred him to a foster home on the ground that immediate removal was necessary to avoid imminent danger to his life or health. The Supreme Court vacated previous judgment and stated: "Before a State may sever completely and irrevocably the rights of parents in their natural child, due process requires that the State support its allegations by at least clear and convincing evidence... But until the State proves parental unfitness, the child and his parents share a vital interest in preventing erroneous termination of their natural relationship".

Also District of Columbia Court of Appeals conclude that the lower trial court erred in rejecting the relative custodial arrangement selected by the natural mother who tried to preserve her relationship with the child. The previous judgment granting the foster mother's adoption petition was reversed, and the case remanded to the trial court to vacate the orders granting adoption and denying custody, and to enter an order granting custody to the child's relative.

In 2007 Deanna Fogarty-Hardwick obtained a jury verdict against Orange County (California) and two of its social workers for violating her Fourteenth Amendment rights to familial association by unlawfully placing her kids in foster care. The $4.9 million verdict grew to a $9.5 million judgment as the County lost each of its successive appeals. The case finally ended in 2011 when the United States Supreme Court denied Orange County's request to overturn the verdict.

== Foster care structure ==
A law passed by Congress in 1961 allowed AFDC (welfare) payments to pay for foster care which was previously made only to children in their own homes. This made aided funding foster care for states and localities, facilitating rapid growth. In some cases, the state of Texas paid psychiatric treatment centers as much as $101,105 a year per child. Observers of the growth trend note that a county will only continue to receive funding while it keeps the child in its care. This may create a "perverse financial incentive" to place and retain children in foster care rather than leave them with their parents, and incentives are sometimes set up for maximum intervention.

Findings of a grand jury investigation in Santa Clara, California:

The Grand Jury heard from staff members of the DFCS and others outside the department that the department puts too much money into "back-end services," i.e., therapists and attorneys, and not enough money into "front-end" or basic services. The county does not receive as much in federal funds for "front-end" services, which could help solve the problems causing family inadequacies, as it receives for out-of-home placements or foster care services. In other words, the Agency benefits, financially, from placing children in foster homes.

Today, foster care in the United States is a complex structure of non-governmental organizations (NGOs) working together with state governments and the federal government to provide services to children deemed in need. The government's role remains to primarily provide funding to states that then decide how to allow the funds between the NGOs who offer foster care services. The methods enacted to provide foster care services create active discussions about the efficacy and ethics of the foster care system.

== LGBTQ+ foster parents ==
LGBTQ+ individuals and couples often seek to foster or adopt children as a means of family building. While frequently met with backlash, the Child Welfare Information Gateway (https://www.childwelfare.gov) recently published an FAQ regarding the topic. The factsheet opens with "Many foster care and adoption agencies, both public and private, welcome the lesbian, gay, bisexual, transgender, and questioning (LGBTQ+) community as valuable resources for infants, children, and youth in need of permanent families. Still, LGBTQ+ prospective foster and adoptive parents continue to face significant challenges related to adoption," (CWIG, 2021). Specific policies surrounding foster or adoption by LGBTQ+ prospective parents are state specific and often vague. While a ban on adoption by queer couples has been ruled unconstitutional, exclusive language that limits access by queer couples is present in many states. Language that refers to a "husband and wife" or "mother and father" leads to unclear criteria on how a queer couple may complete paperwork. The incorporation of inclusive language, such as "married couples" or "spouses," allows for more accessibility to queer families and ultimately assists with the goal of finding safe housing for children in need.

== Critical debates ==
=== Monitoring ===
Many worry that there is a monitoring problem within the foster care system. As of now, foster care services are left to independent organizations, leaving the market accountable for service delivery, policy and program development and implementation. "Institutionally, the acceleration in the breadth and depth of the private provision of child welfare services has given rise to the metaphor of the 'hollow state', in which command-and-control public bureaucracies are replaced by networks of public and private agencies that share service production and governance responsibilities". On the one hand, the current structure of the child welfare system allows for greater functioning at a community level and allows for more organizational autonomy. Their inter-organizational networks enable access to "critical resources and expertise, thereby altering agency service technology and enhancing frontline service capacity". On the other hand, the system may cause barriers to innovation due to a lack of communication between the government and the private agencies and between the agencies themselves. It is difficult for the government to determine the quality of foster care services provided by the various nonprofit agencies due to the individualized nature of service goals and a lack of meaningful performance measures which, in turn, generates "an information asymmetry in which the government is unable to monitor the quality of services provided".

=== Harms to child development ===
Some scholars argue that foster care is inherently harmful and should be replaced by non-foster care kinship placement; in this view, foster care often fails at providing the basic needs of safety and stability, and that placing a child in foster care is as harmful as leaving the clients in their original situation. Yet, there is also scholarship arguing the opposite side: that there is either no effect or a positive effect on cognitive development and academic achievement with children involved in foster care. This view asserts that there are no viable and research-based alternatives, or that the research is difficult to do in kinship placement settings, nor do alternatives include what is considered the necessary government financial support, state-funded services, or court oversight and monitoring.

Ethical concern surrounds the standards for foster care selection and intervention. Currently, Structured Decision Making (SDM) tools are used to determine if a child is in immediate danger. The system is called into question on the basis of classification error due to the binary decision point to intervene. Advocates for a change in the decision-making process express that there is a need for less restrictive means to ensure child safety. The alternate view is that any detriment to child safety is too much. This debate is tightly linked to the issue of overrepresented demographics in the foster care system.

=== Racial bias ===
There is discussion around the ethical concern that the decision to use foster care is biased and racially skewed in the United States. "33% of children who reside in the foster care system are African American, while African American children account for only 15% of the total child population". There is concern about racial biases based on the decision to use foster care as black and Indigenous children are overrepresented due to assumed differential treatment or discrimination. The counter is that it just so happens that black children are maltreated at higher rates. Maltreatment has a positive correlation with low-income families and these two demographics are more readily impoverished. Poverty, substance abuse, domestic violence, and parental incarceration are all major factors that affect the entry of children into foster care and are all found in higher frequencies within these racial demographics. However, it is imperative to acknowledge that poverty does not just happen to be prevalent in these populations, it is a result of the system that they are living in which contains vast amounts of structural inequality. There is a lack of preventative services and community-based services for families and communities of color compounded with service providers lacking cultural humility that exacerbates the demographic disparity within the foster care system.

=== Involvement of private religious organizations in foster care ===
Following the constitutional issues raised in Fulton v. Philadelphia, increased scrutiny on the involvement of private religious groups in national foster care programs has increased scholarly interest in the history of charitable groups in the realm of child welfare services. Professor Elizabeth D. Katz of the University of Florida Levin College of Law conducted extensive primary source research of records and literature between 1700s to 1940s to develop fuller picture of the major stakeholders that drove the development of the modern system of organized child placements in the United States. Her findings confirmed the extensive participation of faith-based organizations (FBA) in child welfare services and noted how this continuing participation has been the product of a stream of "substantial" taxpayer funding and successful lobbying efforts for laws that further protect FBA's role in foster care.

While acknowledging that private religiously-affiliated orphanages filled in the institutional gap left by a lack of public funding dedicated to child welfare services, Professor Katz cautioned that legislators and the larger public must recognize that historically, religious groups have played roles in widening disparities in the quality of services available to children depending on their religion, race, or gender. This is made apparent in light of routine religion matching practices not only in private foster care placements, but also in custody determinations in juvenile court, which have left many children from minority religious and ethnic groups with unequal and inadequate care. Drawing from historical parallels, Professor Katz concludes by calling for an openness to experiment with alternative options go beyond today's present reliance on private foster care agencies. This includes enhanced welfare programs that strengthens public, secular organizations and redirects funding from private agencies to families.

=== Revenue maximization and fiscal concerns ===
Professor Daniel Hatcher of the University of Baltimore, author of "The Poverty Industry: The Exploitation of America's Most Vulnerable Citizens" has testified before Congress, the Maryland General Assembly, and in other governmental proceedings regarding several issues affecting children and low-income individuals and families. Hatcher's scholarship has addressed the conflicts between state agencies' revenue maximization strategies and the agencies' core missions to serve low-income children and families—including the practice of state foster care agencies converting foster children's Social Security benefits into state revenue, Medicaid maximization and diversion practices, welfare cost recovery policies in the TANF program, and foster care cost recovery through child support enforcement.

=== Rethinking foster care ===
There is debate surrounding how children enter foster care. Martin Guggenheim argues that "providing children with strong legal representation furthers the state's interests in ways that are not advanced when parents are presented equally well." At the Juvenile Rights Division of New York City's Legal Aid Society, Martin Guggenheim represented children in child welfare and juvenile criminal cases for many years. Key points made include the limited autonomy of children's attorneys as attorney roles are defined and restricted by state-enforced processes, the high number of cases assigned to children's attorneys prevents adequate representation that should be focused on the best interest of the child, and political relationships and professional reputation can influence the children's attorneys' actions and decisions through the adversarial court proceedings. In the welfare case, In re Jennifer G. (1984), an appellate court issued an opinion leading to the removal of an attorney for his courtroom language used to advocate for reunification. The attorney stated some risk, yet still advocated for the mother. This was the first time an attorney had been removed from a case and there has never been an attorney removed for advocating for state custody or continued removal. Guggenheim notes that the obvious point to the entire idea behind familial removal is that it is and has been a "social experiment that comes with its own risks."

A 2025 study in The Review of Economics and Statistics found through quasi-randomization that among similar children, being placed in foster care "substantially reduced the chances of adult arrests, convictions, and incarceration." The authors found that the mechanism for this is that parents made positive changes after their child was placed in foster care, which meant that upon reunification, the child was in a better environment.

Relatedly, Professor Vivek Sankaran, University of Michigan, is author of "Rethinking Foster Care: Why Our Current Approach to Child Welfare Has Failed" and "A Cure Worse Than the Disease? The Impact of Removal on Children and Their Families." Sankaran advocates for the rights of children and parents involved in child welfare proceedings. His work focuses on improving outcomes for children in foster care by empowering their parents and strengthening decision-making processes in juvenile courts. In 2009, Professor Sankaran founded the Detroit Center for Family Advocacy, the first organization in the country to provide multidisciplinary legal assistance to families to prevent the unnecessary entry of children into foster care. In 2011, he was named Michigan's Parent Attorney of the Year.

=== Foster industrial complex ===
Professor Dorothy Roberts likens the child welfare system to the prison industrial complex in her use of the term foster industrial complex: child welfare is a multi-billion-dollar government-backed structure involved in the management of millions of marginalized people via surveillance, intrusion, and forced upending of children from their homes. Black children and their families are disproportionately targeted by child welfare investigations and removals from their households, with the vast majority of interventions being related to allegations of poverty-related neglect. Roberts draws the comparison between the overfunding of police and the overfunding of child welfare agencies, with both state apparatuses continuing to harm citizens while leaving structural conditions of people's hardships unaddressed. She advocates for an abolition of the foster care system (alongside police abolition) to differently allocate the billions used on destroying families by removing children from their homes. Spending would instead go to initiatives more conducive to child and family social wellbeing, such as cash assistance payments, healthcare and housing funding, and other forms of aid directly provided to children's caregiving networks.

== Abuse and negligence ==
In 2010, an ex-foster child was awarded $30 million by jury trial in California (Santa Clara County) for sexual abuse damages that happened to him in his foster home from 1995 to 1999; he was represented by Stephen John Estey. The foster parent, John Jackson, was licensed by the state, despite the fact that he abused his own wife and son, overdosed on drugs and was arrested for drunken driving. In 2006, Jackson was convicted in Santa Clara County of nine counts of lewd or lascivious acts on a child by force, violence, duress, menace and fear, and seven counts of lewd or lascivious acts on a child under 14, according to the Santa Clara County District Attorney's Office. The sex acts that he forced the children in his foster care to perform sent him to prison for 220 years. Later in 2010, Giarretto Institute, the private foster family agency responsible for licensing and monitoring Jackson's foster home and others, was also found to be negligent and liable for 75 percent of the abuse that was inflicted on the victim, and Jackson himself was liable for the rest.

In 2009, Oregon Department of Human Services agreed to pay $2 million into a fund for the future care of twins who were allegedly abused by their foster parents; this was the largest such settlement in the agency's history. According to the civil rights suit filed on request of the twins' adoptive mother in December 2007 in U.S. Federal Court, the children were kept in makeshift cages—cribs covered with chicken wire secured by duct tape—in a darkened bedroom known as "the dungeon." The brother and sister often went without food, water or human touch. The boy, who had a shunt put into his head at birth to drain fluid, did not receive medical attention, so when police rescued the twins he was nearly comatose. The same foster family previously took into their care hundreds of other children over nearly four decades. DHS said the foster parents deceived child welfare workers during the checkup visits.

Several lawsuits were brought in 2008 against the Florida Department of Children & Families (DCF), accusing it of mishandling reports that Thomas Ferrara, 79, a foster parent, was molesting young girls. The suits claimed that even though there were records of sexual misconduct allegations against Ferrara in 1992, 1996, and 1999, the DCF continued to place foster children with Ferrara and his then-wife until 2000. Ferrara was arrested in 2001, after a 9-year-old girl told detectives he regularly molested her over two years and threatened to hurt her mother if she told anyone. Records show that Ferrara had as many as 400 children go through his home during his 16 years as a licensed foster parent (from 1984 to 2000). Officials stated that the lawsuits over Ferrara ended up costing the DCF almost $2.26 million. Similarly, in 2007 Florida's DCF paid $1.2 million to settle a lawsuit that alleged DCF ignored complaints that another mentally disabled Immokalee girl was being raped by her foster father, Bonifacio Velazquez, until the 15-year-old gave birth to a child.

In a class action lawsuit Charlie and Nadine H. v. McGreevey was filed in federal court by "Children's Rights" New York organization on behalf of children in the custody of the New Jersey Division of Youth and Family Services (DYFS). The complaint alleged violations of the children's constitutional rights and their rights under Title IV-E of the Social Security Act, the Child Abuse Prevention and Treatment Act, Early Periodic Screening Diagnosis and Treatment, 504 of the Rehabilitation Act, the Americans with Disabilities Act, and the Multiethnic Placement Act (MEPA). In July 2002, the federal court granted plaintiffs' experts access to 500 children's case files, allowing plaintiffs to collect information concerning harm to children in foster care through a case record review. These files revealed numerous cases in which foster children were abused, and DYFS failed to take proper action. On June 9, 2004, the child welfare panel appointed by the parties approved the NJ State's Reform Plan. The court accepted the plan on June 17, 2004. The same organization also filed similar lawsuits against several other states in recent years that caused some of the states to start child welfare reforms.

In July 2022, the Georgia Bureau of Investigation arrested two gay men – William and Zachary Zulock – who were sentenced in December 2024 to 100 years in prison for the repeated sexual abuse and exploitation of their two adoptive sons. The case garnered national and international attention, with some right-wing political commentators and politicians baselessly linking the Zulocks's homosexuality to their crimes, while criticizing child services for granting custody of the two boys who had been in foster care since they were removed from their drug addict parents.

== See also ==
- Adoption in the United States
- Youth services
- Child Protective Services
- Child abandonment
- Child custody
- Child abuse
- Congregate Care
- Cottage Homes
- Family First Prevention Services Act
- Foster care
- Orphanage
- Poverty in the United States
  - History of poverty in the United States
- Residential Child Care Community
- Teaching-family model
- Substance dependence
- Supported living
- Supported housing
