= National Association for the Support of Long Term Care =

ADVION
- Trade name: ADVION
- Industry: Lobbying
- Founded: 1989; 37 years ago
- Headquarters: Washington, D.C.
- Key people: Genice Hornberger (President); Cynthia Morton (Chief Executive Officer)
- Website: https://www.advionadvocates.org/

ADVION, known as National Association for the Support of Long Term Care (NASL) until October 2022, is a United States trade association of ancillary providers of products and services to the post-acute care industry. This includes nursing homes, assisted living, home care, inpatient rehabilitation facilities, independent living, adult day care, hospice and long-term care hospitals. ADVION represents and advocates for its members on legislative and regulatory issues that impact the quality of care to patients in long-term care settings. ADVION is headquartered in Washington, D.C.

ADVION was formed in 1989 and represents close to 100 companies providing medical services, such as physical therapy, occupational therapy, and speech-language pathology, and information technology to the post-acute care industry. ADVION member companies employ over 25,000 therapy professionals and represent approximately 64% of the nation's long-term care health information technology providers.

ADVION continually influences national healthcare policy, particularly, improved Medicare ancillary payments and assurance that laws and regulations are in place to promote quality patient care. ADVION has established a positive working relationship with federal agencies like the Centers for Medicare and Medicaid Services and the Office of the National Coordinator for Health Information Technology, and leads initiatives, such as reform of the Medicare Physician Fee Schedule, extension of the therapy cap exceptions process, an alternative to a therapy cap, competitive bidding process, and adoption of health information technology.

Every ADVION member is active on one of three working committees: Medical Services, Information Technology, and Diagnostic Testing, and several workgroups. ADVION committees and leadership participate in and manage national and industry-wide coalitions, host and sponsor national and state education sessions, and the support the development of healthcare policy.

ADVION members receive daily communications regarding federal and state government healthcare decision-making; participate directly in the government healthcare policy-making process; can speak directly to elected, appointed, and senior health policy officials; and receive discounts on meeting registration.
