= Jeremy Kohomban =

- Born: Sri Lanka (formerly Ceylon)
- Education: Emporia State University (BA), Long Island University (MA), Regent University (PhD)
- Occupation: Nonprofit executive
- Organization: The Children's Village

Jeremy Christopher Kohomban is a Sri Lankan-born American policy expert, financial reform activist and President and Chief Executive Officer of The Children's Village. He advocates for more evidence-based treatment approaches, investments in post-treatatment services and directing investments into communities rather than institutions. Kohomban has been recognized with several honors, including the U.S. Congressional Coalition’s Angels in Adoption Award and the Child Welfare League of America’s Exemplary Innovative Leadership Award.

== Early life and education ==
Kohomban was born in Sri Lanka. His higher education was in the United States, his BA from Emporia State University in Kansas, his MA from Long Island University, New York, and PhD from the School for Business and Leadership at Regent University, Virginia.

== Career ==
Kohomban trained as a neuropsychologist under Dr. Alan Dubro. From 1996 to 2003, he led Easter Seals New York. In 2004, he joined The Children's Village, a historical charity founded in 1851 dedicated to helping children and families. Throughout his career, he has focused on implementation policy financial reform, and community investments. Kohomban is involved in national and international public service and advocacy. He was chair of the Human Services Council of New York and national co-chair of the Children Need Amazing Parents (CHAMPS) campaign. He was a trustee for Save the Children and later the Save the Children Action Network (SCAN). He is a member of the Bipartisan Policy Center's child welfare initiative and a reviewer for the American Institutes for Research.

=== International and domestic initiatives ===
In 2009, at the request of the Save Iraqi Children Foundation and the Government of Iraq, Dr. Kohomban led efforts to develop local Iraqi NGO leadership. His work contributed to the creation of the My Life Story book, which helped children orphaned by war reclaim their identity. The initiative trained over 360 Iraqi leaders who were committed to serving their local communities during the post war years.

Following the 2010 earthquake in Haiti, Kohomban was asked to join the federal response to assist children who were injured and separated from their families. The Children's Village's provided medical care and reunification services for over 400 Haitian children.

In 2015, Jeremy joined national advocates calling for more federal funds to support families rather than exclusively funding family separation. He testified before the Senate Finance Committee on behalf of reform and the Family First Prevention and Services Act was signed by President Trump in 2018. After the passage of the act in 2018, he was recognized as a key off-the-hill booster for the legislation. On March 14, 2018, Senators Orrin Hatch and Ron Wyden introduced Kohomban's name into the Congressional Record for his bipartisan efforts in reforming foster care funding.

== Awards and honors ==
Kohomban received the US Congressional Coalition Angels in Adoption Award and the Child Welfare League of America Exemplary Innovative Leadership Award and entered into the Congressional record for his contributions to the federal Title 4E financial reforms enacted through the Family First Prevention Services Act of 2018.

Kohomban was awarded an honorary Doctor of Letters (LittD) from Mercy College, New York.
