= Children's Village (New York) =

Residential treatment facility

Coordinates: 41°00′07.6″N 73°51′48.3″W

The Children's Village, formerly the New York Juvenile Asylum, is a private, non-profit residential treatment facility and school for endangered youth. It was founded in 1851 as a public-private venture between the State Legislature and 24 citizens of New York who were concerned about growing numbers of street children in New York. (Note: The 24 incorporators were Robert B. Minturn, Myndert Van Schaick, Robert M. Stratton, Solomon Jenner, Albert Gilbert, Stewart Brown, Francis R. Tillou, David S. Kennedy, Joseph B. Collins, Benjamin F. Butler, Isaac T. Hopper, Charles Partridge, Luther Bradish, Christopher Y. Wemple, Charles O'Conor, John D. Russ, John Duer, Peter Cooper, Apollos R. Wetmore, Frederick S. Winston, James Kelly, Silas C. Herring, Rensselaer N. Havens, and John W. Edmonds.) The necessity for such an institution was first proposed by the Association for Improving the Condition of the Poor, which helped to get it started. It has since expanded its programs to support children and families in various capacities.

== Purpose ==
Hundreds of homeless and runaway children were present on the streets of New York in the early 1850s, and many of them were arrested every year. As part of its mission "to care for, train, and morally uplift a mixed group of the City's poor children," the New York Juvenile Asylum provided housing, education, and reform for those children, and eventually placed them in apprenticeships. It provided a non-punitive alternative for children who had been arrested, and taught disobedient or unoccupied children "self-discipline of body, mind, and heart." In its earliest days it was not particularly effective, and became primarily a place to house disruptive children.

The mission and purpose of The Children's Village has evolved from its origins in the 1800s. In 2016 its website noted that its mission was to "work in partnership with families to help society's most vulnerable children so that they become educationally proficient, economically productive, and socially responsible members of their communities." By 2025 it said that it "is committed to the wellbeing of children, teens, and families by advocating for, strengthening, and reuniting families; building community partnerships; creating innovative programs; and connecting people to resources that focus on equity, basic needs, and human rights."

== History ==
The original charter for the school was drafted in 1850. After some initial fundraising difficulties, the school was opened in a rented building on January 10, 1853. Early on, the asylum was able to house 400 students, who received six hours of schooling a day, plus other types of instruction, such as vocational education. The school also joined two other charities and founded the orphan train program between 1855 and 1903, placing 6,323 children with families throughout the Midwest, notably Illinois.

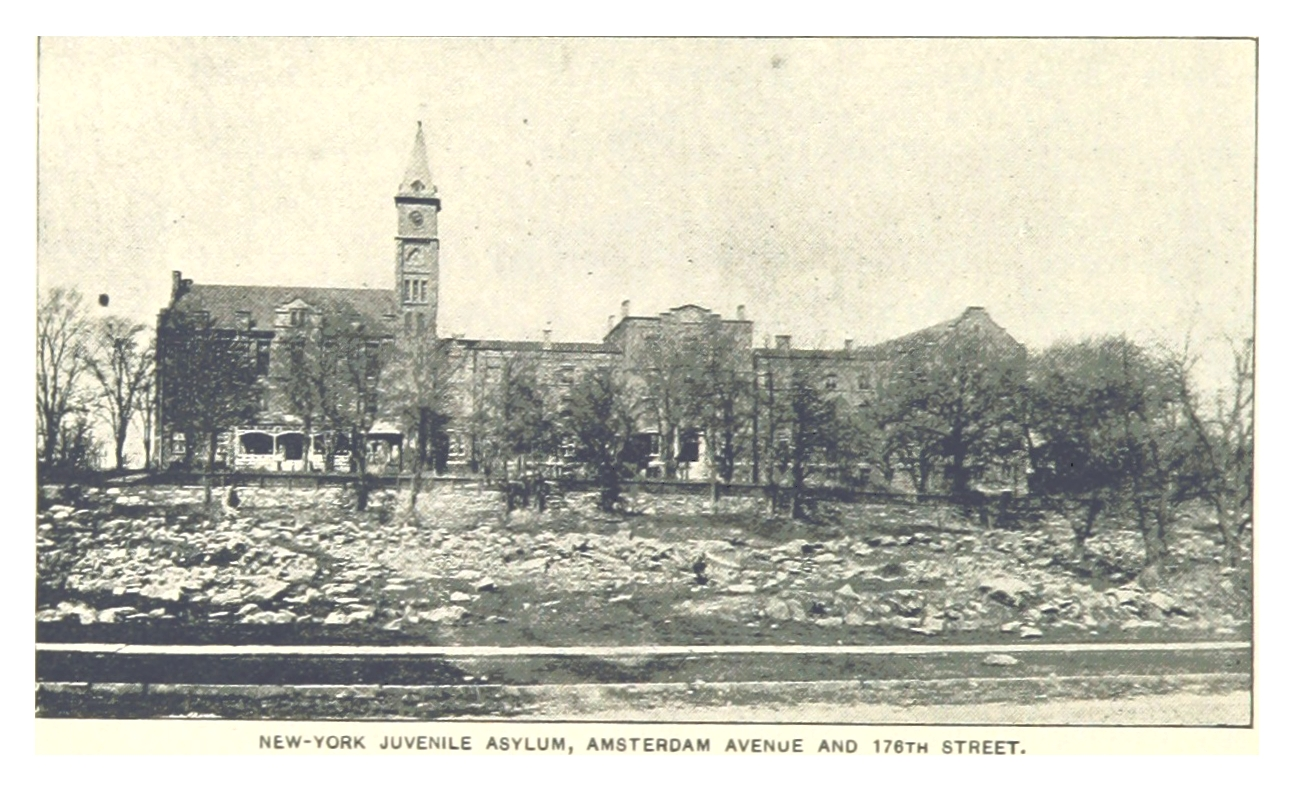
Amsterdam Avenue and 176th Street, Ca 1890

In 1854 property was purchased in Washington Heights. This property consisted of 23 acres, and later expanded to 29. This campus had 1,200 beds, although it averaged 582 children per year between 1871 and 1879. The original plan called for two separate facilities: a House of Reception where children would be initially sent by authorities and would be fed, bathed, and housed, while an investigation occurred to determine if there were family who would care for them, and the Asylum, where students would be housed long-term. A massive building of blue granite was constructed on 175th Street between 10th and 11th Avenues, and opened in 1856. It was described as being "somewhat too prison-like in appearance." An 1860 New York Times article said, "It has a front of 150 feet, two wings, each 75 feet in length and 46 in breadth, and a central extension, 82 feet deep and 43 feet in width. A brick wall incloses play-grounds for both sexes."

Children were committed to the asylum for a variety of reasons, and included children whose parents were incarcerated, whose parents considered them to be "bad" and beyond their control, who had been sustaining themselves by begging, and who were truants, homeless, or thieves. The asylum was designed to provide such children a home, not to be a prison.

The facility was racially integrated in 1860.

In 1901, the Asylum's Board of Directors sold its city property and purchased a 277-acre farm in Dobbs Ferry, New York, in Westchester County. The new location was intended to be more homelike than the granite building in Washington Heights had been. Instead of dormitories housing 50–75 students, it featured cottages arranged around a central quad. At one point there were more than 40 buildings, including not only cottages and classroom buildings, but also workshops and a printing shop. This design won a gold medal for architecture at the St. Louis World's Fair in 1904.

The new facility was designed to be a therapeutic community. The number of children housed and cared for was reduced from an average of 582 per year between 1871 and 1879 to 300 in the new facility, where living arrangements were modeled on typical family life; married couples lived with and cared for the children. In 1901, the institution was renamed "The Children's Village". Children did not stay at the facility indefinitely; after 6–12 months they were returned to their families or placed in foster care.

There was a new focus on mental health and social work in the 1920s, with the Children's Village becoming the first residential treatment center in the country to have an on-site psychiatric clinic and a social work training school.

The New York Juvenile Asylum and its later incarnation, the Children's Village, saw much success and praise, with many students going on to lead successful lives. (Note: A Chicago Tribune obituary from November 10, 1880, reprinted on page 18 of the Children's Village's 1881 annual report notes that Peter Walsh, a "New York waif" who "knew neither father nor mother" had been sent out west by the New York Juvenile Asylum and been adopted by Dr. Porter. He went on to attend the Law School of Ann Arbor, and served for many years as the Chicago City Attorney and prosecuting attorney.) However, the Children's Village also saw criticism for its institutional model, artificial environment, and practice of mixing "virtuous" children from broken homes with children who had been arrested for criminal activity. In the 1920s, The Children's Village opened the National Training School for Institution Executives and Workers, the first facility of its kind, which eventually became part of the New York School of Social Work.

In 1927, The Children's Village became the first child care agency in the U.S. to establish a psychiatric clinic on its campus.

In 1958 the organization was officially designated as a Residential Treatment Center. The concept of an orphanage evolved from a residential school for troubled boys to a clinical program meeting the needs of young people with a range of conditions and issues.

In 1970, the first Therapeutic Recreation Internship program in the United States was established at The Children's Village, a program that continues to operate.

In the 1970s and 1980s the racial makeup of the Children's Asylum shifted, with an increasing proportion of African-American students. The median age dropped to 12, and students remained at the facility longer, often for several years.

The Working Appreciation for Youth (WAY) program, now known as Working Alongside Youth, was introduced in 1984 to teach work ethic and offer the first long-term aftercare program for young people with severe conditions and issues.

In the 1990s there was a rise in opposition to residential and institutional facilities nationwide. Many were forced to close. The Children's Village saw its funding, both from government and from private donors, decrease, and it had to tap into its endowment to remain afloat. The Children's Village revamped its treatment procedures in light of increased criticism of the residential model. There was an increased focus on treating children's behavioral and emotional problems and preparing them for reintegration with either their families and communities, or a foster home. This re-vamped model resulted in increased funding, both governmental and by private donors, and allowed the Children's Village to increase the number of children it was able to help per year from 5,000 under the old model, to 10,000 in the new one.

In 2014, The Children's Village joined a small group of national advocates committed to changing Federal funding that continued to incentivize family separation over family support. In 2015 then President of The Children's Village Jeremy Kohomban testified before the Senate Finance Committee and made the case for a dramatic change in Federal funding and called for the passage of the Family First Prevention Services Act. The Act established a new model for short-term residential treatment called a Qualified Residential Treatment Program (QRTP). The QRTP was a model developed and tested at The Children's Village beginning in 2007.

In 2016, Inwood House, a charity founded in 1830 to support pregnant and parenting teens in achieving independence and stability, merged with The Children's Village.

== Services ==
Through its various programs focused on family support, community investment and school-based programs and housing, CV reaches 21,000 children, teens, and families each year. The organization serves children separated from families due to child welfare (foster care), juvenile justice involvement, and children who are victimized by human trafficking.

=== Community and School-Based Supports ===
Programs operate in schools and neighborhoods, aiming to reduce school dropout rates. The Inwood House Division operates many of these community-based programs, providing after-school programs with parenting and life skills, leadership and career training "Our Teen Choice" program that partners with over 32 public schools to help teens delay sexual activity, reduce risky sexual behaviors, and avoid teen pregnancy. The program includes classroom-based health education workshops, intensive small group mutual-aid discussions, and individual counseling. The Drew Hamilton Community Center in Central Harlem provides after-school programming, summer camp, a teen center, and adult classes to provide safe and educational spaces for all family members. The center also offers support for pregnant and parenting teens, including young fathers. ACTS The Eliza, a facility located in Manhattan, offers a STEM robotics lab, teaching kitchen, performance space, sensory room, and early education programing. Sanctuary, Westchester County's only runaway and homeless shelter, provides short-term shelter and family mediation. Sanctuary also operates the Street Outreach Program, providing counselors in a teen-friendly mobile unit to reach alienated youths. These counselors serve as a trusted voice to discuss more stable alternatives.

=== Family Reunification, Foster Families, Adoptive Families, and Treatment ===
The organization provides Multisystemic Therapy (MST) program, an internationally known program that was designed to serve youth with social/emotional challenges, blending cognitive behavioral therapy, behavior management training, family therapies, and community psychology to keep youth with their families. The Children's Village also provides Child and Family Treatment and Support Services (CFTSS), which offers in-home behavioral health support and counseling, as well as Functional Family Therapy (FFT) as alternative therapeutic models to prevent a child's or teen's removal from the household. When a child is placed in foster care, the organization works with the family to facilitate safe reunification. If reunification is not a viable option, Children's Village has 400 foster parents who provide temporary care.

=== Teen Trafficking and Homelessness Prevention ===
Programs assist runaway and homeless youth, including victims of human trafficking. Organization aims to help teens leave the streets and exit the relationships of exploitation by providing temporary shelter, care, and support. Short-term care shelters provide community homes focused on safety, medical, and mental health treatment for victims of human trafficking, teens who are pregnant or parenting, and those who are runaway or homeless. Stays in these shelters are voluntary, a typical stay is about 30 days. In 2023, 90% of the teens served returned to their families or to a guardian.

=== New Americans, Immigration, and Family Reunification ===
The organization provides family reunification services, short-term behavioral and psychiatric residential treatment, and community support services for children who have arrived in the United States without a guardian. Its Migrant Family Support and Relocation teams provide legal education and help families file asylum petitions, get work permits, and adjust to living in the United States.

== Programs ==
=== Mitigating Juvenile and Criminal Justice Impacts ===
The organization offers early intervention programs to disrupt the school-to-prison pipeline. The Transformative Mentoring Initiatives program pairs youth involved or at risk of being justice-impacted (primarily in New York City) with trained mentors who have personal experience in the juvenile justice system. The initiative aims to reduce recidivism through skill-building and emotional support. Program provide evidence-based and evidence-informed interventions designed to help youth develop healthy coping skills, stay in school, graduate, and succeed in life, including models such as: the Integrated Treatment Model (ITM), Functional Family Therapy (FFT), Multisystemic Therapy (MST), BraveLife Intervention (BLI), and Working Alongside Youth (WAY).

== Operations ==
The Children's Village has more than 1,200 employees. The organization reaches 21,000 children, teens, and families each year. Jeremy Kohomban is President and CEO of the company.

== See also ==
- Colored Orphan Asylum
