= Section 125 =

Section 125 may refer to:

- Cafeteria plan, Section 125 of the Internal Revenue Code (US)
- Section 125 of the Constitution Act, 1867
- Section 125 of the Constitution of Australia
- Section 125 of the Code of Criminal Procedure (India), regarding alimony
