= Endowment tax =

Tax on financial endowments not otherwise taxed

Endowment tax is the taxation of financial endowments in the United States. Previous to 2018, the proceeds from endowments were not taxed. Endowment income can be billions of dollars at the wealthiest some charitable foundations, and some medical foundations. Several educational institutions have endowment/student ratio of >$1M. It is the income from these highly endowed institutions that are targeted.

== Endowment taxation ==
Unlike nonprofit corporations classified as a public charity, private foundations in the United States are generally subject to a 1% or 2% excise tax on any net investment income. As enacted in the Tax Cuts and Jobs Act of 2017 and amended by the Bipartisan Budget Act of 2018, an excise tax of 1.4% on endowment income is levied on universities that have at least 500 tuition-paying students and net assets of at least $500,000 per student. The $500,000 is not adjusted for inflation, so the threshold is effectively lowered over time. The 2018 endowment tax impacted the 53 wealthiest schools. It was in line with what most other philanthropic charities pay in excise taxes.

=== Proposed changes in 2026 ===
The endowment tax was expanded in 2026. It is levied on endowment income (not endowment per se) plus royalties, etc. The level of taxation will be tiered, based on the endowment/student ratio.

- 8% rate at schools with ≥$2M/student, which would apply to Harvard, Stanford, Princeton, Yale and MIT.
- 4% rate for schools with $750,000 to $2M/student, which would apply to Rice University, University of Notre Dame, Dartmouth College, and some others
- 1.4% rate for schools with $500,000 to $750,000/student

The 2026 legislation would apply to private institutions with > 3,000 students. Only U.S. students count, which in effect encourages colleges to raise their number of domestic students (perhaps at the cost of foreign students). Some of the most affected institutions are:

Institution	Enrollment (FTE – fall 2023)	Endowment per student (USD – FY2024)
Princeton University	9,079	$3,750,669
Yale University	15,269	$2,714,107
Stanford University	17,623	$2,135,335
Harvard University	24,357	$2,133,974
Massachusetts Institute of Technology	11,777	$2,086,500
University of Notre Dame	12,785	$1,399,873
Dartmouth College	6,700	$1,234,823

The first five institutions each pay hundreds of millions according to the 2026 law.

== See also ==
- List of colleges and universities in the United States by endowment
- Payment in lieu of taxes
