= John Dennison Russ =

American physician (1808–1881)

- Born: September 1, 1801; Essex, Massachusetts
- Died: May 1, 1881 (aged 79); Pompton Township, New Jersey
- Occupation: Philanthropist
- Organizations: Children's Village; New York Institute for the Blind
- Spouse: Eliza P. Jenkins (m. 1830)

John Dennison Russ (September 1, 1801 – March 1, 1881) was an American medical doctor and co-founder of the New York Institute for the Blind and The Children's Village, along with 23 others.

== Biography ==
Russ was born in Essex, Massachusetts (then the parish of Chebacco, in Ipswich) on September 1, 1801, to Parker and Elizabeth Russ (née cogswell).

He graduated from Yale College in 1823. Upon leaving college, he began the study of medicine with John D. Wells, Professor of anatomy and physiology in Bowdoin College, he continued it at Baltimore Medical School and Boston Medical School, and received his doctorate from the Yale Medical School in 1825.

After spending a year in hospitals abroad, he began practicing in New York City, but in June 1827, sailed from Boston in charge of supplies for the Greeks in their struggle for liberty. He remained in Greece, superintending the development of a hospital service, until his health failed, in the spring of 1830. On his return he entered again in practice in New York City.

At an early date he became interested in the condition of poor children with ophthalmia in the city hospitals, and at his own cost made (in March, 1832) the first attempt at the instruction of the blind which was made in America. He was in the same year appointed Superintendent of the newly chartered New York Institute for the Blind, and in that position introduced many devices in methods of teaching which have been permanently useful. In the midst of these labors his health failed, and he was compelled to resign and seek restoration by a long absence in Europe.

After his return, he engaged in numerous other philanthropic schemes, especially by serving from 1846 to 1854 as the corresponding secretary of the Prison Association of New York, and by originating measures in 1849 which led to the incorporation of the New York Juvenile Asylum (now Children's Village) in 1851. He was the superintendent of this asylum, resigning in 1858. He was also a member of the Board of Education of the City of New York for four years, 1848–51. During his old age he resided in Pompton Township, New Jersey making further improvements in methods of printing for the blind, and interesting himself in other general studies. He died in Pompton, of diabetes, March 1, 1881, in his 80th year.

In 1830, he married Eliza P. Jenkins, daughter of a captain in the English navy.

== See also ==
- Samuel Gridley Howe
- Jonathan Miller
