= Payment in lieu of taxes =

Payment made in lieu of property tax by exempt entities

A payment in lieu of taxes, abbreviated as PILT or PILOT, is a payment made to compensate a government for some or all of the property tax revenue lost due to tax exempt ownership or use of real property.

== Canada ==
In Canada, payment in lieu of taxes are made in place of property taxes on real property owned by federal, provincial, and municipal governments and government agencies to local governments and reserves. The need for PILTs arises from Section 125 of the Constitution Act, 1867 which prohibits levels of government from taxing real property owned by federal and provincial governments. Federal PILTs were introduced by the Payments in Lieu of Taxes Act of 1985 and PILTs by the Government of Ontario were introduced by the Municipal Tax Assistance Act of 1990.

PILTs are made on a volunteer basis, leading situations where local governments receive smaller payments than requested based on property tax assessments. In 2024, Ottawa City Council, the local government of the capital of Canada, estimated it received CA$95 million less in PILTs than it should have from the federal government.

== United States ==
In the United States, payment in lieu of taxes can arise in several ways:

- Land owned by the federal government is generally not subject to taxation by state or local governments. Under Public Law 94-565, enacted in 1976, the federal government began making payments in lieu of taxation to local governments affected by this reduction in their tax bases.
- In some states where land owned by colleges and universities is not subject to local property taxes, the state government reimburses the local governments for part of the tax revenue that the local government would otherwise have collected. In other cases, the institution makes a direct payment to the local government (which would not otherwise be reimbursed) simply to maintain good relations.
- PILOTs may be negotiated in specific circumstances, as when an arrangement is made for a corporation or institution to build a facility on public land without assuming ownership of the land. For example, New York state has several such programs. In conjunction with the proposal to build a West Side Stadium in New York City for use by the New York Jets, there was controversy over the proposal by the Mayor, Michael Bloomberg, to use PILOT money from the Jets to help finance the project rather than applying it to other municipal expenses. The Port Authority of New York and New Jersey, a bi-state public authority, makes payments in lieu of taxes to New York City under an agreement relating to its ownership of the World Trade Center site.
- Similarly, where a non-profit organization may be exempt from equipment taxes and sales taxes, its mission may permit payment of an agreed PILOT to the local tax authorities, to offset the impact upon local services funded by town residents. The size of such payments can be controversial, especially where the organization appears to have federal income from taxable activities. For example, the tax-exempt Appalachian Mountain Club operates a modern hotel for its members in Carroll, New Hampshire, paying a negotiated PILOT amount to the town. A competing commercial hotel would also pay "meals and beds" taxes.
- As an incentive for investment in taxable infrastructure or other facilities that create a public benefit, a PILOT may be negotiated to limit or defer the property taxes on a developer. Such an arrangement usually provides a city with In effect, the local taxpayers are subsidizing the development, which might otherwise have gone elsewhere. For example, this has occurred in lower-income rural areas where large wind energy systems are often placed.

Payments in lieu of taxes for nonprofit organizations can be contractual arrangements between the organization and the municipality or simply an organization's voluntary gesture of goodwill. However, all local governments must provide municipal services such as sewer and water, roads and transit, schools, police, fire departments to these properties. Universities, hospitals, churches, charter schools, and other nonprofit organizations own large amounts of property in many cities but avoid paying property taxes that fund these essential services. The tax-exempt status granted to these entities by the IRS allows these organizations to largely avoid paying for the public services they benefit from. Their services are instead paid for by taxing other property owners in the city's jurisdiction such as homeowners and for-profit businesses.

For many municipalities in the United States, property taxes are the primary source of revenue. The amount of forgone tax revenue as a result of these tax-exempt land parcels is significant. The president of the city council of Baltimore, MD, recently estimated that his city loses $120 million annually from these foregone taxes. According to a 2010 report by the Lincoln Institute of Land Policy, between 2000 and 2010 PILOTs were used in at least 18 states. Seventeen of those states account for 35 cities and towns with PILOTs. In addition, 82 out of a total of 351 municipalities in Massachusetts have collected PILOTs (Massachusetts Department of Revenue 2003). A map in this report also reveals that although these 18 states can be found scattered across the country, the vast majority of this activity seems to be concentrated in the northeast.

Non-profits enjoy the same level of service the rest of the residents of the given city or county enjoy. It is argued that asking some, or all, nonprofits to pay taxes, either voluntarily, or via statutory measures, would help offset some of these costs and ease the strain on local budgets. This would be equivalent to increasing the tax base in these areas.

== See also ==
- Acceptance in lieu
- Tenement for legal reasons
- Endowment tax
