= Bipartisan Budget Act of 2018 =

United States Law

- Long title: An Act To amend title 4, United States Code, to provide for the flying of the flag at half-staff in the event of the death of a first responder in the line of duty.
- Enacted by: the 115th United States Congress

Citations
- Public law: Pub. L. 115–123 (text) (PDF)
- Statutes at Large: 132 Stat. 64

Codification
- Acts amended: Budget Control Act of 2011; Social Security Act

Legislative history
- Introduced in the House as H.R. 1892 by John B. Larson (D-CT) on April 4, 2017; Passed the House as the Further Extension of Continuing Appropriations Act, 2018 on February 6, 2018 (245–182); Agreed to by the Senate on February 9, 2018 (71–28) and by the House on February 9, 2018 (240–186); Signed into law by President Donald Trump on February 9, 2018

The Bipartisan Budget Act of 2018 is a federal statute concerning spending and the budget in the United States, that was signed into law by President Donald Trump on February 9, 2018. Delays in the passage of the bill caused a nine-hour funding gap. The bill is the third in a series that increased spending caps originally imposed by the Budget Control Act of 2011; the first two were the Bipartisan Budget Act of 2013 and the Bipartisan Budget Act of 2015.

== Provisions ==
=== Extensions ===
The bill combined several provisions extending existing existing spending, including:

- A continuing resolution (with short title Further Extension of Continuing Appropriations Act, 2018) lasting until March 23, 2018.
- Suspension of the debt ceiling until March 1, 2019.
- Further increases following the Budget Control Act of 2011 for both defense and nondefense spending, although defense spending was increased more. The defense discretionary funding cap was increased by $80 billion in FY2018 and $85 billion in FY 2019, while the non-defense domestic discretionary spending cap was increased by $63 billion in FY2018 and $68 billion in FY2019.
- Four years of authorization for the Children's Health Insurance Program (CHIP) on top of the six years that was authorized earlier in 2018.

=== New allocations ===
The Act introduced several discrete new spending programs, including:

- The Family First Prevention Services Act, which significantly expands the federal funding available for prevention services that keep children out of the foster care system.
- The Social Impact Partnerships to Pay for Results Act, allocating $100 million towards Social Impact Bonds.

=== Tax breaks ===
The Act amended several several other tax provisions, which would cost $17.4 billion over four years. These included:

- New disaster relief tax breaks for the impact of hurricanes Harvey and Irma in Puerto Rico, the Virgin Islands, Florida, and Texas, and for wildfires in California.
- Industry-specific tax benefits for racehorses; film, television, and live theater productions; advanced nuclear power facilities; plug-in electric motorcycles; fuel cell motor vehicles; biodiesel, energy-efficient home construction, and many renewable energy facilities.
- Expanded deductibility of whistleblower awards under the Securities Exchange Act of 1934, a state false claims act, or the Commodity Exchange Act.
- Removal of the 20 year old health care therapy cap related to physical and occupational therapy.
- The endowment tax that had been imposed by the Tax Cuts and Jobs Act of 2017 was narrowed slightly to affect only schools with at least 500 tuition-paying students.
- It repeals the Independent Payment Advisory Board (IPAB) that was part of the Affordable Care Act.
- Retroactive restoration (for the 2017 tax year only) of several provisions affecting relatively large numbers of individual taxpayers, including the "above-the-line" deduction for certain post-secondary tuition costs (Form 8917), the exclusion from gross income for discharged mortgage debt for a principal residence (Form 982), and the Schedule A itemized deduction for mortgage insurance premiums were retroactively restored. The IRS updated several 2017 tax forms to reflect these extensions.
- Reinstatement of the nonbusiness energy property credit for 2017, and it reinstated the residential energy efficient property credit for qualified small wind energy property costs, qualified geothermal heat pump property costs, and qualified fuel cell property costs to the end of 2021. These had expired in 2016, and the 2017 Form 5695 available prior to the passage the bill had 8 lines of "Reserved for Future Use."
- Expansion of the availability of hardship withdrawals from Section 401(k) retirement plans.
