= Section 125 of the Constitution Act, 1867 =

Provision of the Canadian Constitution

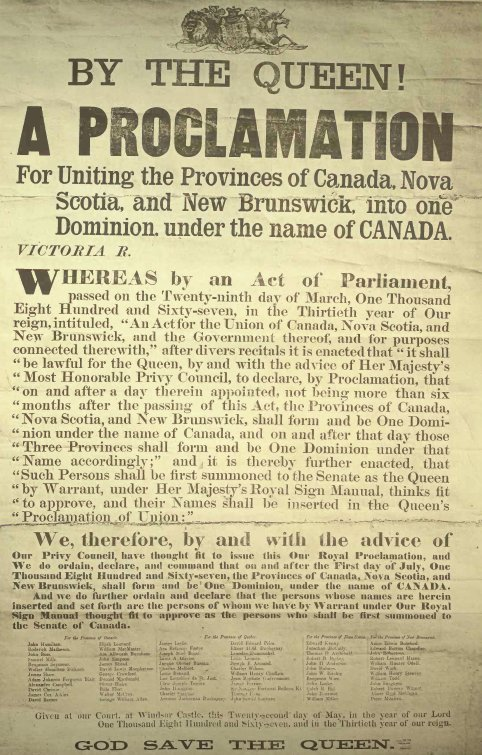
Proclamation bringing the Constitution Act into force, July 1, 1867

Section 125 of the Constitution Act, 1867 (French: article 125 de la Loi constitutionnelle de 1867) is a provision of the Constitution of Canada relating to taxation immunities of the federal and provincial governments. The section provides that the property of the provincial and federal governments are not subject to taxation.

The Constitution Act, 1867 is the constitutional statute which established Canada. Originally named the British North America Act, 1867, the Act continues to be the foundational statute for the Constitution of Canada, although it has been amended many times since 1867. It is now recognised as part of the supreme law of Canada.

== Constitution Act, 1867 ==
The Constitution Act, 1867 is part of the Constitution of Canada and thus part of the supreme law of Canada. It was the product of extensive negotiations by the governments of the British North American provinces in the 1860s. The Act sets out the constitutional framework of Canada, including the structure of the federal government and the powers of the federal government and the provinces. Originally enacted in 1867 by the British Parliament under the name the British North America Act, 1867, in 1982 the Act was brought under full Canadian control through the Patriation of the Constitution, and was renamed the Constitution Act, 1867. Since Patriation, the Act can only be amended in Canada, under the amending formula set out in the Constitution Act, 1982.

== Text of section 125 ==
Section 125 reads:

Exemption of Public Lands, etc.
125. No Lands or Property belonging to Canada or any Province shall be liable to Taxation.

Section 125 is found in Part VIII of the Constitution Act, 1867, dealing with revenues, debts, assets, and taxation. It has not been amended since the Act was enacted in 1867.

== Nature of the taxation power in Canada ==
Section 125 affects the taxation powers of both levels of government, and has received a broad interpretation in the Canadian courts.

Since the 1930 Supreme Court of Canada ruling in Lawson v. Interior Tree Fruit and Vegetables Committee of Direction, taxation is held to consist of the following characteristics:

- it is enforceable by law;
- imposed under the authority of the legislature;
- levied by a public body; and
- intended for a public purpose.

In addition, the 1999 SCC ruling in Westbank First Nation v. British Columbia Hydro and Power Authority has also declared that a government levy would be in pith and substance a tax if it was "unconnected to any form of a regulatory scheme." The test for a regulatory fee set out in Westbank requires:

- a complete, complex and detailed code of regulation;
- a regulatory purpose which seeks to affect some behaviour;
- the presence of actual or properly estimated costs of the regulation; and
- a relationship between the person being regulated and the regulation, where the person being regulated either benefits from, or causes the need for, the regulation.

This is important to note, as taxation is barred under s. 121, but regulatory fees are not, and Canadian jurisprudence under s. 125 has turned on that distinction.

== Interpretation in the Canadian courts ==
The nature of s. 125 has been described as thus:

Section 125 provides, in broad terms, that no lands or property of the federal or provincial Crown shall be “liable to taxation”. The purpose of this immunity, as we have seen, is to prevent one level of government from appropriating to its own use the property of the other, or the fruits of that property. This immunity would be illusory if it applied only to taxes “on property” but not to a tax on the Crown in respect of a transaction affecting its property or on the transaction itself. The immunity would be illusory since, by the simple device of framing a tax as in personam rather than in rem one level of government could with impunity tax away the fruits of property owned by the other. The fundamental constitutional protection framed by s. 125 cannot depend on subtle nuances of form.

Therefore, its prohibition covers taxation on the holding, as well as the acquisition and disposal, of property. In addition:

- the provision also extends to property held by Crown corporations, and
- the prohibition on levying such taxation also extends to local governments levying taxes on federal property, as well as to First nations levying taxes on provincial property, although measures have been taken to mitigate the impact through payments in lieu of taxes.

However, provinces must collect and remit sales taxes on any commercial sales they make, since the obligation when it acts as supplier does not amount to a taxation of the province's property.

In addition, provincial authorities must still pay customs duties, because such charges are not strictly based on the taxation power. As noted in the Johnnie Walker case:

Customs duties are, no doubt, in at least one aspect "taxation" within the meaning of that term as ordinarily used and, I think, as used in the B.N.A. Act, s. 91 (3). They are a mode or system of taxation for the raising of money and are a typical form of indirect tax. But they are, it seems to me, something more—they are tolls levied at the border as a condition of permission to import goods into the country being granted by the governmental authority clothed with jurisdiction either entirely to prohibit their entry, or to prescribe conditions on which such entry may be effected. In legislating for such prohibition or for permission to enter conditional upon payment of certain duties, Parliament is exercising its authority for "the regulation of trade and commerce", as well as its right to provide for "the raising of money by any mode or system of taxation". In their aspect as tolls imposed in exercise of the power to regulate trade and commerce customs duties are not "taxation".

Because of that, as noted in Re Exported Natural Gas Tax:

If the primary purpose is the raising of revenue for general federal purposes then the legislation falls under s. 91(3) and the limitation in s. 125 is engaged. If, on the other hand, the federal government imposes a levy primarily for regulatory purposes, or as necessarily incidental to a broader regulatory scheme, ... then the levy is not in pith and substance “taxation” and s. 125 does not apply.
