= Therapy cap =

In 1997 the Balanced Budget Act established annual per-beneficiary Medicare spending limits, or therapy cap, for outpatient physical therapy, occupational therapy and speech language pathology services covered under Medicare Part B. Facilities affected by the therapy cap include: private practice, physician offices, skilled nursing facilities, rehabilitations agencies, comprehensive outpatient rehabilitation facilities, critical access hospitals, and outpatient hospital departments. For 2014, the therapy cap amount is $1920 for physical therapy and speech pathology combined. A separate $1920 is allowed for occupational therapy services. Beneficiaries enrolled in Medicare Advantage plans are not subject to the therapy cap unless the plan chooses to apply the cap.

Beginning in 1999, Congress placed repeated moratoria on the Therapy Cap through 2006. In 2006, an exception process was put into place through the Deficit Reduction Act of 2005. The exception process allowed for additional therapy services "when medically necessary" up to $3,700 after which, a manual medical review was required before further payment was provided. Once the cap is reached, patients are required to pay out of pocket for further services. Without further legislation, the therapy cap exception process was to expire on March 31, 2015. At this time, hospital based outpatient clinics will no longer be subject to the therapy cap.

On February 9, 2018, as part of the Bipartisan Budget Act of 2018, President Donald Trump permanently removed therapy caps when he signed the bill into law.

== Controversy ==
Several medical associations and organizations including the American Physical Therapy Association and American Occupational Therapy Association have lobbied against therapy caps because the bill restricted disabled seniors, stroke patients, and other severe cases from receiving therapy treatments.

Another controversy is the original bill combined physical therapy and speech therapy together allowing only a shared $1810 per calendar year for both therapy services. This error has yet to be corrected by Congress, further limiting therapy services to outpatients.

== Studies ==
The Government Accountability Office have concluded through an independent study that the therapy caps are not meeting the needs of patients.

The Study and Report on Outpatient Therapy Utilization by the Centers for Medicare and Medicaid Services (CMS) released in September 2002 concluded that older patients require more therapy than what the cap allowed: "patients who are female, older, minorities, live in certain geographic regions, require the services of institutional providers and suffer from complex medical conditions are more likely to require more costly outpatient therapy services than the general outpatient therapy population."

The American Heart Association concluded that the Medicare caps are costing the government more money in the long run, especially to stroke patients. According to their study, arbitrary caps on rehabilitation therapies punish stroke patients who often undergo needed extensive rehabilitation programs. More than 5.4 million Americans, including 4.4 million people with Medicare, are living with the consequences of stroke. The failure to properly treat and rehabilitate stroke patients costs $21.8 billion annually in lost productivity and disability expenses.

A 2011 study produced a comprehensive cost analysis of for outpatient therapy services provided to individuals following a stroke. This study demonstrated the average cost of outpatient therapy services was $11,689 for the first year following a stroke. This amount is between 66 and 73% of the total outpatient cost of care, including medication, for 1 year following a stroke.

An independently prepared utilization report for CMS indicated patients with diagnoses including stroke, cognitive deficits, diabetes, degeneration of multiple joints, prior joint replacement, Parkinson's disease will require therapy services beyond what is covered by the therapy cap.
