= Family First Prevention Services Act =

Child welfare legislation included in the United States budget

The Family First Prevention Services Act (FFPSA) was included in the Bipartisan Budget Act of 2018 (HR 1892) and signed by President Donald Trump on February 9, 2018. While the primary purpose of the legislation at the time was keeping the government funded for six more weeks to pave the way for a long-term budget deal, the included FFPSA marked a significant change in states' ability to prioritize and fund prevention services in child welfare.

== Overview ==
Title IV-E of the Social Security Act authorizes the federal government to assist states with funding for foster care, adoption and guardianship assistance, and other actions to support child welfare.

One of the major areas changed by the legislation is the way Title IV-E funds authorized by can be spent by states. Title IV-E funds previously could be used only to help with the costs of foster care maintenance for eligible children; administrative expenses to manage the program; and training for staff, foster parents, and certain private agency staff; adoption assistance; and kinship guardianship assistance.

One of the significant reforms of FFPSA was a new option for states, territories, and tribes with an approved Title IV-E plan to implement federal Title IV-E Family First Prevention Programs. States that take this option can be reimbursed for evidence-based prevention services, including home visiting, to help more children remain safely at home with their families and avoid needing foster care. The Family First Prevention Services Act also seeks to curtail the use of congregate or group care for children and instead places a new emphasis on family foster homes.

According to early childhood policy organizations such as the Alliance for Early Success, this change to federal statute "represents sweeping reform to federal child welfare policy," and it provides "significant new opportunities for states to improve the health and well-being of children of all ages, including very young children as well as teen parents of young children."

== Implementation ==
The 116th U.S. Congress included additional funding for FFPSA implementation, as part of a 2019 end-of-year spending bill (H.R. 1865). The relevant section of the appropriations act, entitled the Family First Transition Act provided one-time, start-up funding in the amount of $500 million to states. The funding, along with flexibility provisions was intended to help state child welfare organizations cover costs related to new models of preventive services envisioned by FFPSA.

As of mid-2021, more than 15 states had submitted plans.
