= John Franklin Gray =

American physician (1804–1882)

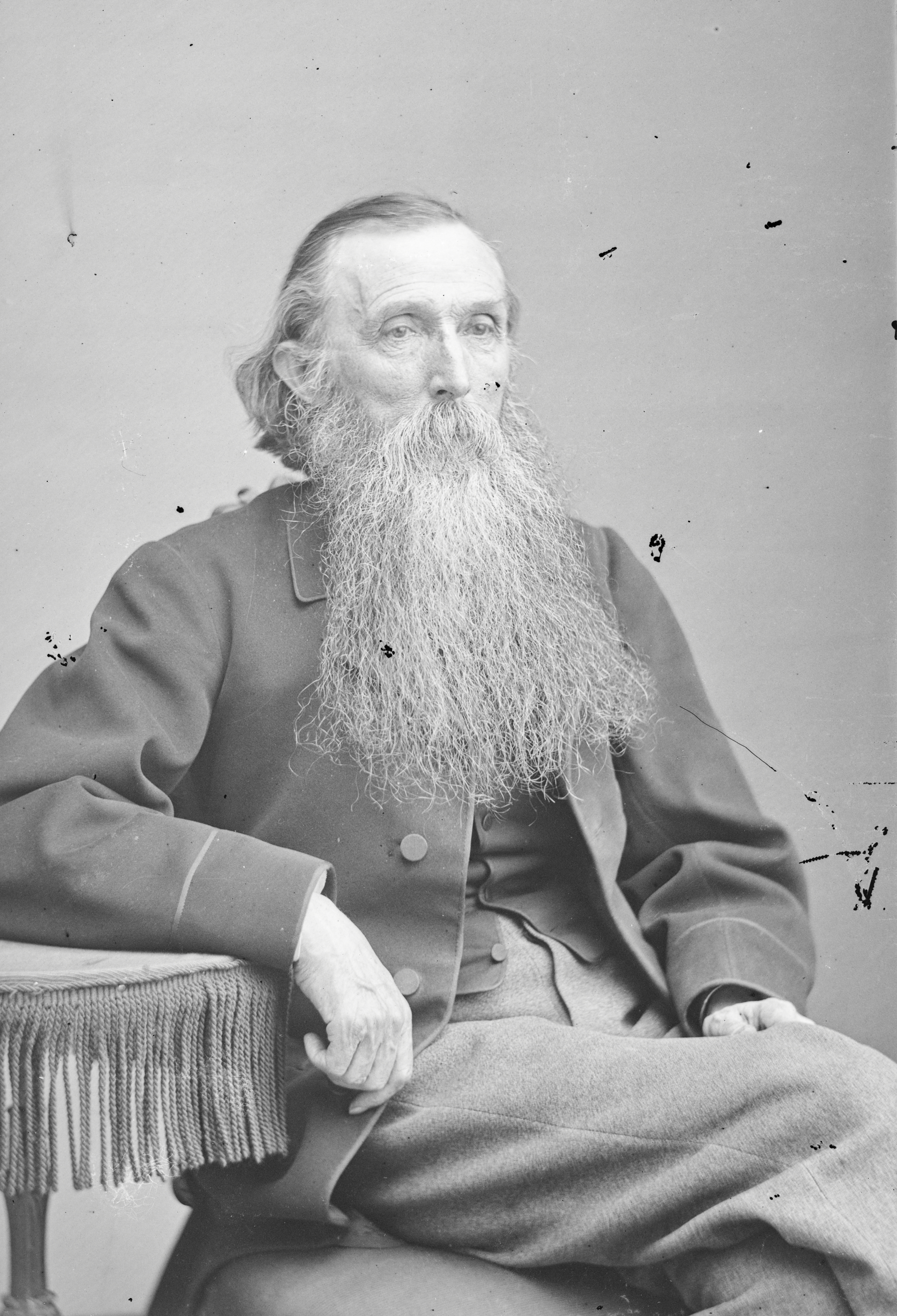
- Born: 23 September 1804; Sherburne, New York, U.S.
- Died: 9 June 1882 (aged 77); Fifth Avenue Hotel New York City
- Burial place: Green-Wood Cemetery
- Education: Columbia University College of Physicians and Surgeons
- Known for: Homoeopathy
- Spouse: Elizabeth Hull Williams
- Medical career
- Profession: Physician
- Field: Homoeopathy

John Franklin Gray (September 23, 1804 – June 9, 1882) was an American educator and medical doctor, a pioneer in the field of homoeopathy and one of its first practitioners in the United States. He is also recognized as an important medical reformer.

== Biography ==
=== Early life and ancestors ===
John Franklin Gray was born on September 23, 1804, at Sherburne, New York and died on June 9, 1882, at the Fifth Avenue Hotel, in New York City. He was the fourth of five sons of John Gray, (December 15, 1769 - April 24, 1859), and the grandson of John Gray, a founder of Sherburne, and Elizabeth Skeel. Two of Dr. Gray's brothers, Dr. Alfred W. Gray (1802–1873) and Dr. Patrick Wells Gray (1806–1882), were both prominent homeopathic physicians and surgeons. Another brother, Nathaniel Gray, was a tanner and politician who served in the New York State Assembly in 1833. Dr. Gray's father served as a captain in Col. Samuel Whiting's 4th regiment of the Connecticut Militia in the American Revolutionary War. He was appointed and served as first Judge of the Court of Common Pleas for Chenango County, New York until 1819 when the family removed to Sheridan, Chautauqua County, New York. His life was celebrated by the poet John Greenleaf Whittier, at his funeral in 1859 thus recalls him:

When watched by eyes that love him, calm and sage, Slow fade his late declining years away.

His mother was Diantha Burritt, (January 9, 1776 - October 14, 1846) the daughter of the Rev. Blackleach Burritt, who graduated from Yale College in 1765. Diantha had been a school teacher in Vermont before her marriage, at Winhall, Vermont on May 26, 1793, and was a poet and woman of literary taste.

=== Marriage and family ===
He married on September 25, 1826, in New York City, Elizabeth Williams Hull, born in 1808 in New Hartford, New York and died on May 28, 1868, in New York City, and is buried in Green-Wood Cemetery in Brooklyn beside her husband.

She was the daughter of Dr. Amos Gift Hull, a prominent and eminent physician of New York City and one of the founders of the State Medical Society of New York and his third wife, Eunice Williams.

John and Elizabeth were the parents of eight children, all born in New York City: Elizabeth Williams Gray, John Hull Gray, John Franklin Gray, Jr., John Frederick Schiller Gray, Josephine Augusta Gray, Emma Geraldine Hull Gray, Mary Ludlow Gray and Edward Hull Gray.

=== Education ===
He began the study of medicine in the academy in Hamilton, New York, (now Madison University) for two years, He first entered the office of Dr. Haven, of Hamilton, New York and he stayed there for two years. He then left for Dunkirk, New York, where he opened a private school, studying medicine all the time under Dr. Ezra Williams.

In 1824, when just 20 years old, he removed to New York City and received instruction from Drs. Valentine Mott and David Hosack. Hosack was a physician, botanist, educator, and a founder of the Columbia University College of Physicians and Surgeons. He was also the doctor who attended to Alexander Hamilton after Hamilton's deadly duel with Aaron Burr.

It was a common practice in the early 19th century for students to receive a part of their education through a system of apprenticeships until medical schools were to assume a major role in education. These apprenticeships usually covered a period of three years and were regulated by local medical societies.

During the time of his studies he was appointed assistant surgeon in the navy; and as it was necessary that he should be a graduate or licentiate in order to hold this position, he was accorded a license by the county medical society. He graduated from Columbia University College of Physicians and Surgeons in 1826.

=== Career ===
Immediately after graduating and completing his residency, he opened an office on Charlton Street in New York City. In acquiring his practice he was assisted by his future father-in-law, Dr. A. G. Hull, of New York, by Dr. Hosack, and by Dr. Watts. Dr. Gray's success in obtaining patients and social patronage was very strong and rapid; so much so, that in his first year he was enabled to get married and to support a moderate house comfortably, and in his second to sustain a doctor's horse and gig.

Soon after starting in private practice he began the study of the French language, and carried it far enough to read medical authors; two years later he began the German, and kept at it till he could read it fluently and even speak it with palpable scope and accuracy of diction.

Soon after, he learned of Hahnemann's medical theories through Hans B. Gram, a Danish doctor, who was born in Boston of Danish parents and was educated in Denmark. He heard Dr. Gram lecture, but was not convinced. He then reluctantly consented to let Dr. Gram treat one of his patients, whose case had resisted his own skill. Dr. Gram had remarkable success, not only with that patient but with others, and Dr. Gray was converted to homeopathy. He did not, however, believe that homeopathy and allopathic medicine to be mutually exclusive, but rather believed them to be complementary.

In 1828, Dr. Gray adopted homœopathy as the major rule in his practice and announced his intention to practice according to that system openly, and in consequence lost his profitable practice and all his professional friends. He endured many hardships and much ill-treatment for his devotion to homeopathy. Dr. Gray was the first to propose the formation of a national society of homeopathy, and in 1844 the American Institute of Homeopathy was organized.

In 1833, he commenced the practice of medicine in partnership with his brother-in-law. Dr. Amos Gerald Hull.

In 1834, he founded the New York Homœopathic Society. Its stated purpose was for the purpose of protecting, enriching and disseminating such of the propositions and testimonies of Homœopathia as upon mature trial they shall find to be sound and available. The first officers of the society were: president, John F. Gray; vice-presidents, Edward A. Strong, George Baxter; corresponding secretary, Federal Vanderburgh; recording secretary, Daniel Seymour; treasurer, F. A. Lohse; registrar, A. Gerald Hull; librarian, F. L. Wilsey; finance committee, J. H. Patterson, Oliver S. Strong, L. M. H. Butler, William Bock.

This society was composed of physicians and laymen. William Cullen Bryant, the poet-editor, was a member. He was an early convert to homœopathy and all his life was a strong supporter of its principles.

== Personal life and spiritualism ==
Every week, the Grays hosted a salon ,noted for attracting the leading artists and intellectuals of the day, as well as other prominent medical men of the city who attended. These medical men became well known as social leaders in the city, supporting causes such as the abolition of slavery and women's suffrage. Dr. Gray befriended the poets William Cullen Bryant, John Greenleaf Whittier and Walt Whitman and was a patron of American artists including, Asher Brown Durand and Frederic Edwin Church as well as Samuel Morse, the inventor of telegraphy.

He was also a well-known and prominent Spiritualist in New York as well as a frequent lecturer on the subject. He was a close friend and associate with Kate, Leah and Margaret Fox (the Fox sisters), Andrew Jackson Davis, Amy and Isaac Post and with the Davenport brothers.

He became a noted philanthropist in his later years, especially to the poor, and was consulted in various social issues.

== Awards and honors ==
He received the honorary degree of Doctor of Laws from Hamilton College in 1871. He was also a life member of the New York Chapter of The Society of the Cincinnati.

Scientific American referred to Gray as "the father of homeopathy in America" in his June 1882 obituary.

== Death ==
He died on June 9, 1882, at New York City. He is buried in Green-Wood Cemetery in Brooklyn.

== Descendants ==
- Dr. C. Loring Brace IV, Biological anthropologist.
- Gerald Warner Brace (1901–1978) was an American writer, educator, sailor and boat builder.
- Gerald Hull Gray

== List of works ==
- The early annals of homœopathy in New York : a discourse before the Homœopathic Societies of New York and Brooklyn, on 10 April 1863, the anniversary of the birthday of Hahnemann. New York : Homœopathic Medical Society of the County of New York, 1863
- Homoeopathy in New-York, and the late Abraham D. Wilson, A.M., M.D.. New York : William S. Dorr, Printer, 1865

== Sources ==
- Brace, Charles Loring. The life of Charles Loring Brace, chiefly told in his own letters. London: Sampson Low, Marston & Co., 1894.
- Brace, Gerald Warner. Days that Were. New York: W.W. Norton & Company. 1976. ISBN 0-393-07509-5
- Bradford, Thomas Lindsley, M.D. The Pioneers of Homœopathy. Philadelphia : Boericke & Tafel, 1897.
- Cleave, Egbert. Cleave's biographical cyclopaedia of homoeopathic physicians and surgeons. Philadelphia: Galaxy publishing company, 1873.
- Dexter, Franklin B. Biographical Sketches of the Graduates of Yale College with Annals of the College History. New York: Henry Holt & Company, 1903.
- Haller, John S. American medicine in transition 1840-1910. Urbana: University of Illinois Press, ©1981. ISBN 0-252-00806-5.
- Hills, Alfred K.. New York Medical Times. New York: E.B. Colby & Company, 1881.
- Kaplan, Justin. Walt Whitman: A Life. New York: Simon and Schuster, 1979. ISBN 0-671-22542-1
- Clark, Edward S. The Stephens Family, with Collateral Branches. New York: Job Printers and Eletrotypers, 1891.
- Harvard College (1780- ). Class of 1889.. Twenty-fifth anniversary, 1889-1914 : Seventh report of the class secretary. Boston : Cockayne, 1914.
- King, William Harvey, ed. 'History of Homoeopathy and Its Institutions in America. Vol. I. New York: Lewis Publishing Company, 1905.
- O'Connor, Stephen. Orphan trains : the story of Charles Loring Brace and the children he saved and failed. Chicago : University of Chicago Press, 2004.1. ISBN 0-226-61667-3.
- Raymond, Marcius Denison Gray genealogy : being a genealogical record and history of the descendants of John Gray, of Beverly, Mass., and also including sketches of other Gray families. New York: Higginson Book Company, 1887.
- Rothstein, William G. American physicians in the nineteenth century : from sects to science. Baltimore : Johns Hopkins University Press, 1992. ISBN 0-8018-4427-4
