= Gerald Warner Brace =

American novelist, writer, educator, sailor, and boat builder

- Born: September 24, 1901; Islip, Long Island, Suffolk County, New York
- Died: July 20, 1978 (aged 76); Blue Hill, Maine
- Occupations: Novelist, writer, educator, sailor, boat builder
- Writing career
- Genres: Fiction, non-fiction

Gerald Warner Brace (September 24, 1901 – July 20, 1978) was an American novelist, writer, educator, sailor and boat builder. His work frequently employed settings from rural life in New England.

== Biography ==
=== Early life and ancestors ===
He was born on September 24, 1901, in Islip, Long Island, Suffolk County, New York, and died on July 20, 1978, at Blue Hill, Maine.

Gerald W. Brace was a son of Charles Loring Brace Jr., who was an 1874 graduate of Phillips Academy in Andover, Massachusetts, and a graduate of Yale College class of 1876 with a degree in Civil Engineering. C. L. Brace was a Mugwump in politics. He was employed as Superintendent and Engineer of Construction with the Minneapolis and St. Louis Railway at Minneapolis. When his father, CLB Sr., died in 1890, he was invited by the trustees of the New York Children's Aid Society to take up as Secretary and chief executive officer of that society.

Gerald Brace's mother was Louise Tillman Warner, the daughter of Dr. Lewis Tillman Warner and Elizabeth Williams Gray. Elizabeth was the daughter of Elizabeth Williams Hull, a daughter of Dr. Amos Gift Hull, a well known surgeon of New York, and a sister of Dr. Amos Gerald Hull (1810–1859), an 1832 graduate of Rutgers Medical College and an influential Homeopathic Physician.

Elizabeth Williams Gray was also the daughter was Dr. John Franklin Gray (1804–1882), an 1826 graduate of the Columbia University College of Physicians and Surgeons and the first practitioner of homeopathy in the United States. He is buried in Green-Wood Cemetery in Brooklyn, New York. He was a grandson of the Rev. Mr. Blackleach Burritt and a descendant of Governor Thomas Welles.

Dr. Warner's second wife was Sarah Loring MacKaye, (1841–1876) a woman of extraordinary charm and brilliance, and a pianist of professional ability. She was the daughter of Emily Steele and Colonel James M. MacKaye, a successful attorney and an ardent abolitionist and an organizer of The Wells Fargo Express Company, and President of American Telegraph Company. Sarah was a sister of American playwright, actor, theater manager and inventor James Morrison Steele MacKaye.

He is the grandson of Letitia Neill of Belfast, Ireland and Charles Loring Brace, Yale College 1846, who was a contributing philanthropist in the field of social reform. He is considered a father of the modern foster care movement and was most renowned for starting the Orphan Train movement of the mid-19th century, and for founding The Children's Aid Society in 1853.

He is a great-grandson of John Pierce Brace, an 1812 graduate of Williams College who was head teacher at Litchfield Female Academy. The academy was founded in 1792 by his aunt, Sarah Pierce (1767–1852) and was one of the earliest schools for girls in the United States.

J. P. Brace left Litchfield Female Academy in 1833 and moved on to a position at Catharine Beecher's Hartford Female Seminary. He was also editor of the Hartford Courant. His wife was Lucy Porter, the sister-in-law of Lyman Beecher, Yale College, 1797 and a descendant of politician, and diplomat Rufus King, who was one of the signers of the United States Constitution.

Gerald W. Brace had a typical upper-middle class Victorian upbringing. He always looked back with nostalgia on the moral certainties and romantic visions of that age. Though he lived in a century of industrialization and technology, and rapid social change, he dreamt of sailing ships, lonely country farms, and romantic adventures.

Although Brace spent his youth in New York, he became a quintessential New Englander. From the beginning of the 20th century, the Brace family summered in Maine, especially at Deer Isle. Sailing was a way of life. He wrote about it in both his fiction and non-fiction.

=== Education ===
When he turned 8, he began attending a private school for boys called the Allen-Stevenson School on Fifty-sixth Street, between Park Avenue and Madison Avenue in New York City. In 1913, he began attending The Gunnery and graduated from Loomis Chaffee School in 1918. He received his Bachelor of Arts degree in English from Amherst College in 1922. He received both his Master of Arts and Ph.D. degrees from Harvard University.

When he entered Amherst College he first became acquainted with and studied under the poet Robert Frost. In later years, when both he and Frost lived in the Boston area, Frost would often join them for dinner and fascinated Brace's children by his speculative nonstop monologue.

It was also during his college years that he began taking long hikes in The Berkshires and then into the mountains of Vermont.

He became acquainted with the harsh life of the rural people who lived on the back country roads, subconsciously gathering subject matter for his novels. Many of his books dealt with a way of life that was already disappearing, however, his plots and writing style continued to evolve.

Hoping to learn more about boat design, Gerald entered a graduate program in Architecture at Harvard, but he soon realized that he was in the wrong field. He really wanted to write, and he was allowed to transfer to English and take a seminar in Creative Writing.

After he received his master's degree, he was offered a teaching position at Williams College where he added a passion for skiing to his enjoyment of long mountain hikes. He found that he got along well with students and enjoyed teaching.

=== Family ===
He married on December 3, 1927, at the Community Unitarian Church in White Plains, New York, by the Rev. James Alexander Fairley, (Rev. Fairley's son, Lincoln Fairley, was Brace's roommate at Harvard) Huldah Potter Laird, born on November 12, 1902, at Boston, Suffolk County, Massachusetts, and died in August 1986 in Belmont, Massachusetts. She was the daughter of Raymond Gilchrist Laird and Huldah Blanche Potter. She taught biology at Lasell College (formerly known as Lasell Seminary) prior to her marriage to Brace.

Gerald and Huldah were the parents of three children:

- C. Loring Brace, (1930–2019) is an anthropologist at the University of Michigan.
- Gerald Warner Brace Jr. (1931–2003)
- Barbara Brace Seeley (1934–2003)

== Career ==
He began his career as an instructor and professor of English and of creative writing teaching briefly at Williams College, and later at Dartmouth College and Mount Holyoke College. He has spent most of his teaching career at Boston University where the creative writing program still awards a prize in his name.

It was said of him that as a sailor he was as skilled as any lobsterman who shared Penobscot Bay. Laconic in his ways, he woke early to write, to shape words that spoke his sense of what Maine stood for against the ebbing of old New England.

His college years at Amherst served to confirm his strong and romantic attachment to the traditions of New England. He always looked for the old ways, the remnants of the past in action ... and though he knew life and the world were harsh and often tragic, he had a conviction that old New England had once discovered a classic serenity that could still be perceived. he died in Blue Hill Maine on July 20, 1978, at 76.

=== Reputation ===
Brace, like C. P. Snow, greatly admired Anthony Trollope above all of the English novelists and wrote an introduction to The Last Chronicle of Barset. Reviewers of his novel, The Department, inevitably compared him to C. P. Snow. One reviewer called his novel The Department the American equivalent of The Masters, which was awarded the James Tait Black Memorial Prize in 1954, in its witty and basically good-humored anatomy of every English department there ever was.

He was referred to by The New England Quarterly as "the forgotten New England novelist", and his time for his life along the New England coast. He as a writer, sailor, boat designer, and teacher, introduced readers to seafaring folk and farmers, townspeople and "summer people".

From his first book through of his succeeding books, it is dominated by scene. He has few equals in New England landscapes and perhaps none in describing her coastline, especially the jagged rock and spruce covered coast of Maine. It was also said of all of his novels that the quality of his "prose style so perfected and shaped that it is difficult to find anywhere a poorly written sentence."

What follows is a brief description of his works.

=== The Garretson Chronicle ===
In his novel, The Garretson Chronicle, depicting three generations of a Massachusetts family, he deals with satirizing the decline of Emersonain New England, and the battle with the mountain (a modern version of Moby Dick). The narrator-hero of the novel is a young boy who has never been content with his job as the village carpenter and is always searching for roots and a sense of accomplishment. This novel was promoted for the Pulitzer Prize in 1948.

=== The Wayward Pilgrims ===
The Wayward Pilgrims is a novel about a young university instructor, traveling around the state of Vermont, who meets an older woman, at a train depot, who teaches him about her experiences in life.

=== The Department ===
The narrator of the novel is Robert "Sandy" Sanderling, a professor of American literature with a degree from Harvard, who is planning his retirement speech. Looking back over his life, he feels that he has accomplished very little and his one novel, Aftermath was not the book he had hoped it would be; his marriage was a disaster; he has no real friends in his department, and the profession of teaching and the field of scholarship have changed and left him behind.

It is also one of the first novels portraying the institutional and personal responses to political influences on college campuses during the 1960s.

=== List of works ===
He wrote eleven novels and, in addition, literary works such as The Age of the Novel (1957) and The Stuff of Fiction (1969). In 1976 he published his autobiography, Days That Were, which included his own illustrations.

Most of Brace's novels are set in New England. They include:

- The Islands (1936), set in Maine
- The Wayward Pilgrims (1938), set in a Vermont train depot
- Light on a Mountain (1941)
- The Garretson Chronicle (1947)
- A Summer's Tale (1949)
- The Spire (1952
- Bell's Landing (1955)
- The World of Carrick's Cove (1957), a nominee for the 1958 National Book Award for Fiction
- Winter Solstice (1960)
- The Wind's Will (1964)
- The Department (1968/1983), which was translated and published in Bengali in 1970

=== Students ===
- Philip R. Craig (1933–2007) was a writer known for his Martha's Vineyard mysteries.

=== Awards ===
He was a 1958 National Book Award nominee for fiction. In 1967 he won the Shell Award for Distinguished Writing from Boston University.

== Sources ==
- Brace, Gerald Warner. Days that Were. New York: W.W. Norton & Company. 1976. ISBN 0-393-07509-5.
- Burlingame, Dwight F. Philanthropy in America: A Comprehensive Historical Encyclopedia. ABC-CLIO, Inc. ISBN 1-57607-860-4.
- Cleave, Egbert. Cleave's biographical cyclopaedia of homoeopathic physicians and surgeons. Philadelphia: Galaxy publishing company, 1873.
- Lindgren, Charlotte Holt. Gerald Warner Brace: Writer, Sailor, Teacher. New Hampshire: Hollis Publishing Company. 1998. ISBN 1-884186-08-4.
- Raymond, Marcius Denison. Gray genealogy : being a genealogical record and history of the descendants of John Gray, of Beverly, Mass., and also including sketches of other Gray families. New York: Higginson Book Company, 1887.
- Raymond, Marcius Denison. Sketch of Rev. Blackleach Burritt and related Stratford families : a paper read before the Fairfield County Historical Society, at Bridgeport, Conn., Friday evening, Feb. 19, 1892. Bridgeport : Fairfield County Historical Society 1892.
- Showalter, Elaine. Faculty towers : the academic novel and its discontents. Oxford : Oxford University Press; Philadelphia : Published in the United States by the University of Pennsylvania Press, 2005. ISBN 978-0-19-928332-3.
- Siemiatkoski, Donna Holt The descendents of Governor Thomas Welles of Connecticut, 1590-1658, and his descendants. Baltimore : Gateway Press 1990.
