= C. Loring Brace =

American anthropologist (1930–2019)

- Born: December 19, 1930; Hanover, New Hampshire, U.S.
- Died: September 7, 2019 (aged 88); Ann Arbor, Michigan
- Education: Harvard University
- Scientific career
- Fields: Physical Anthropology; Paleoanthropology
- Workplaces: University of Michigan
- Thesis: Physique, Physiology and Behavior: An Attempt to Analyse a Part of their Roles in the Canine Biogram. (1961)
- Doctoral advisor: William W. Howells

Charles Loring Brace IV (December 19, 1930 – September 7, 2019) was an American anthropologist, Professor Emeritus at the University of Michigan's Department of Anthropology and Curator Emeritus at the University's Museum of Anthropological Archaeology. He considered the attempt "to introduce a Darwinian outlook into biological anthropology" to be his greatest contribution to the field of anthropology.

== Early life and education ==
Brace was born Charles Loring Brace IV in Hanover, New Hampshire in 1930, a son of writer, sailor, boat builder and teacher, Gerald Warner Brace and Hulda Potter Laird. His ancestors were New England schoolteachers and clergymen including John P. Brace, Sarah Pierce, and the Rev. Blackleach Burritt. Brace's paternal great-grandfather, Charles Loring Brace, founder of the Children's Aid Society, had worked to introduce evolutionary theory into the United States and knew Charles Darwin. C. Loring Brace developed an early interest in biology and human evolution as a child in part by reading Roy Chapman Andrews's popular book Meet your Ancestors, A Biography of Primitive Man (1945). He went to Williams College in Williamstown, Massachusetts from 1948–52, where he constructed his own major from geology, paleontology, and biology courses.

Brace was drafted by the U.S. Army during the Korean War and while in the service, worked with the fitting of gas masks so that they would be able to fit a variety of different people. He received a masters (1958) and doctorate (1962) from Harvard University and studied physical anthropology with Ernest Hooton and later with William W. Howells, who introduced Brace to the new evolutionary synthesis of Darwinian evolution and population genetics. During this time he was also able to travel to Europe, where he spent 1959-1960 at Oxford University, in the animal behavior laboratory of Nikolaas Tinbergen, and traveled to Zagreb, Yugoslavia, where he inspected the collection of Neanderthal fossils collected by Dragutin Gorjanovic-Kramberger at Krapina.

After completing his doctorate, he taught briefly at the University of Wisconsin–Milwaukee and then at the University of California, Santa Barbara. He spent much of his career as Professor of Anthropology at the University of Michigan and as Curator of Biological Anthropology at the university's Museum of Anthropology.

== Career ==
=== Neanderthal studies ===
In 1962, Brace published a paper in American Anthropologist titled "Refocusing on the Neanderthal Problem" where he argued, in opposition to French anthropologist Henri Vallois, that the archeological and fossil evidence did not necessarily support the idea that the Neanderthals were replaced by Cro-Magnon populations migrating into Europe, rather than being ancestral to early Homo sapiens.

Brace continued his reappraisal of the Neanderthal problem in 1964 in "The Fate of the 'Classic' Neanderthals: a consideration of hominid catastrophism" published in Current Anthropology. Here Brace traced the history of research on the Neanderthals in order to show how interpretations established early in the century by Marcellin Boule and notions such as Arthur Keith's pre-sapiens theory had convinced many anthropologists that the Neanderthals played little or no role in the evolution of modern humans. Brace argued that cultural factors, especially the increased use of tools by Neanderthals, produced morphological changes that led the classic Neanderthals to evolve into modern humans.

Brace remained a vigorous proponent of the idea that Neanderthals are ancestral to modern humans. He also argued that the fossil record suggests a simple evolutionary scheme whereby humans have evolved through four stages (Australopithecine, Pithecanthropine, Neanderthal, and Modern humans), and that these stages are somewhat arbitrary and reflect our limited knowledge of the fossil record. Brace emphasized the need to integrate the ideas of Darwinian evolution into palaeoanthropology. Much earlier research into human origins relied on non-Darwinian models of evolution; Brace presented his advocacy of the Darwinian approach in The Stages Of Human Evolution, first published in 1967.

He discovered that the craniofacial form of Cro-Magnon allies it with living populations of northwestern Europe, specifically with Scandinavia and England, and hypothesized that Neanderthals were ancestral to Cro-Magnons, and subsequently Europeans. In contrast, skulls like the Qafzeh hominids, were a progenitor to Sub-Saharan Africans, though with more archaic traits.

Brace's ideas generated considerable controversy, as much for his brash criticism of his colleagues as for their content, but they have also influenced a generation of anthropological research into human evolution and the interpretation of the Neanderthals.

=== Other studies ===
In the publication "Clines and clusters versus Race: a test in ancient Egypt and the case of a death on the Nile", Brace discussed the controversy concerning the race of the Ancient Egyptians. Brace argued that the "Egyptians have been in place since back in the Pleistocene and have been largely unaffected by either invasions or migrations".

However, in another study 13 years later, Brace et al. found close affinities between Naqada Egyptians, Somalis, ancient and modern Nubians, and, to a lesser extent, Niger-Congo-speaking populations; on the other hand, no affinities were found between the Egyptians of Naqada and samples from other regions of the world, such as the Mediterranean (including modern Egyptians) and the Middle East, with the exceptions of the Fellaheen of Israel and the Natufians, who, the authors claim, had a clear link with Sub-Saharan Africa.

In a 2006 publication entitled "The questionable contribution of the Neolithic and the Bronze Age to European craniofacial form", Brace argued that Natufian peoples, who are thought to be the source of the European Neolithic, had a Sub-Saharan African element, but that "the interbreeding of the incoming Neolithic people with the in situ foragers diluted the Sub-Saharan traces that may have come with the Neolithic spread so that no discoverable element of that remained."

=== Past Ph.D. students (alphabetical order) ===
- Patricia S. Bridges (1985)
- Dean Falk (1976)
- Sonia E. Guillen (1992)
- Margaret E. Hamilton (1975)
- Robert J. Hinton (1979)
- Kevin D. Hunt (1989)
- Carol J. Lauer (1976)
- Paul E. Mahler (1973)
- Stephen Molnar (1968)
- A. Russell Nelson (1998)
- Conrad B. Quintyn (1999)
- Karen R. Rosenberg (1986)
- Alan S. Ryan (1980)
- Margaret J. Schoeninger (1980)
- Noriko Seguchi (2000)
- B. Holly Smith (1983)
- Frank Spencer (1979)
- Kenneth M. Weiss (1972)
- Richard G. Wilkinson (1970)
- Lucia Allen Yaroch (1994)

== Bibliography ==
- Man's Evolution: An Introduction to Physical Anthropology (1965)
- The Stages Of Human Evolution: Human And Cultural Origins (1967)
- Atlas of Fossil Man. C. Loring Brace, Harry Nelson, and Noel Korn (1971)
- Race and Intelligence. Edited by C. Loring Brace, George R. Gamble, and James T. Bond. Washington: American Anthropological Association, 1971.
- Man In Evolutionary Perspective. Compiled by C. Loring Brace and James Metress (1973)
- Human Evolution: An Introduction to Biological Anthropology. C. L. Brace and Ashley Montagu (1977)
- Atlas of Human Evolution (1979)
- The Stages Of Human Evolution: Human And Cultural Origins (1979)
- Evolution in an anthropological view (2000)
- Race is a four letter word (2005)
