= Sherburne, New York (disambiguation) =

Sherburne, New York is the name of two locations in Chenango County, New York:

- Sherburne (town), New York
- Sherburne (village), New York
