= Sherburne, New York =

- Town
- Motto: "A Public Power Community"

- Location of Sherburne in New York state
- Coordinates: 42°40′41″N 75°29′56″W
- Country: United States
- State: New York
- County: Chenango

Government
  - Type: Town Council
  - Town Supervisor: William C. Craine (R)
  - Town Council: Members' List: • Glen C. Bagnall (R); • Charles A. Mastro (R); • Stephen J. Perrin (R); • Edwin T. Meyer (R)

Area
  - Total: 43.58 sq mi (112.86 km^{2})
  - Land: 43.55 sq mi (112.80 km^{2})
  - Water: 0.019 sq mi (0.05 km^{2})
- Elevation: 1,055 ft (322 m)

Population (2010)
  - Total: 4,048
  - Estimate (2016): 3,918
  - Density: 90.0/sq mi (34.73/km^{2})
- ZIP Codes: 13460 (Sherburne); 13332 (Earlville)
- FIPS code: 36-017-66894
- Website: townofsherburne.gov

Sherburne is a town in Chenango County, New York, United States. The population was 4,048 at the 2010 census. The town contains two villages, Sherburne and Earlville. The town is at the northern border of Chenango County.

== History ==
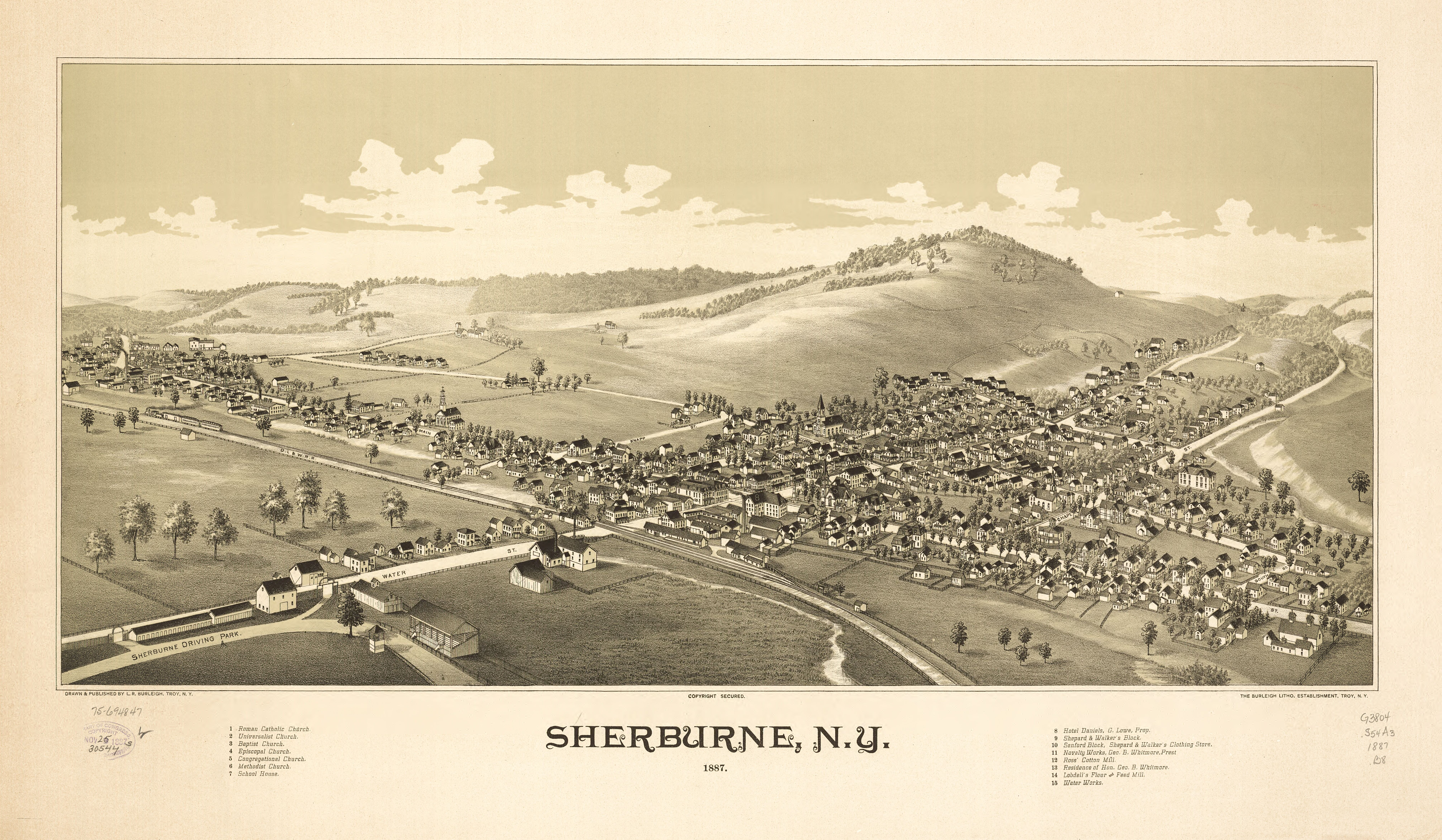
Perspective map of Sherburne and list of landmarks from 1887 by L.R. Birleigh

The area that became Sherburne, part of the Chenango River valley, was originally inhabited by the Oneida people, until the late 1780s when the state of New York purchased the land from them. These parcels were later sold at auction in New York City.

The settlement of Sherburne occurred around 1792 near the present-day Sherburne village. The town was named after the tune "Sherburne", written by Daniel Read in 1783. The early inhabitants had a habit of frequently singing the tune, which was a great favorite with them. (Note: "Sherburne" is a distinctive setting of the popular English carol "While Shepherds Watched Their Flocks".) Most of the earliest inhabitants and settlers of Sherburne were originally from the town of Kent, Litchfield County, Connecticut. Sometime around 1785 or 1786, two years after the Treaty of Paris and Treaties of Versailles were signed on September 3, 1783, ending the American Revolutionary War, the future proprietors and pioneers of Sherburne left Kent and emigrated to Duanesburgh, Schenectady County, New York. After a few years there they had been unable to secure title to the lands on which they settled. It was at that point that they resolved to move again as a body to the Chenango Valley, which had just begun to open lands in the Twenty Townships.

In June 1791, Deacon and Judge Nathaniel Gray, Elisha Gray, Joel Hatch, Abram Raymond, Newcomb Raymond, and James Raymond visited these lands in the interest of the company as an exploring party, accompanied by Josiah Throop, chief of the corps who had surveyed the tract that and the preceding years. On their arrival they found that a family consisting of five men, one woman and some small children from Paris in Oneida County had squatted a few hours previously on Handsome Brook, and were occupying a bark cabin. There they found hospitable welcome through the night and in the morning were regaled by their hostess with new bread and beer, both her own making. This family remained but a short time, for they had left before the return of the exploring party.

The exploratory party examined the southwest quarter of the 9th township, containing 6,222 acres (2,518 ha), which they and their associates eventually bought of Colonel William S. Smith, to whom the township was patented by the state of New York for $1.25 per acre. (Note: Nathaniel Gray was dispatched to New York City to negotiate for the lands. He there found to his disappointment that they had already been sold by the State to Col. Smith. He returned to Duanesburgh, but on consultation made a second trip to New York, on which occasion he succeeded in making a contract with Col. Smith of the desired lands. This was dated December 9, 1791.) The exploratory party returned to Duanesburgh with a good report sometime prior to October 9, 1791, for on that date, James Raymond married Melissa Burritt, the second daughter and child of Rev. Blackleach Burritt, the spiritual leader of the company, and of Martha Welles.

In the summer of 1792, the exploratory party returned, which was mainly composed of the original proprietors, and settled in a cabin near Handsome Brook. During the later summer and fall, the exploratory party had accomplished the work they had set out to do, and they returned to their families in Duanesburgh, except Abram Raymond and his wife, Betsey Gray Raymond, the daughter of John Gray and Elizabeth Skeel and sister of Nathaniel Gray.

Within a year, the first settlers of Sherburne established themselves on their newly acquired plots. And it was not confined alone to the proprietors and their families, most of whom arrived that time, but many of their friends and neighbors from Duanesburgh joined with them. (Note: There were the Grays from Beverly, Massachusetts, by way of Windham County and Sharon, Connecticut, two of whom, Nathaniel and John Gray Sr., had been soldiers in the French war, 1758, and the latter a member of the Committee of Public Safety in King's District, present Columbia County, during the Revolution,---both prominent members of the new settlement; there were the four Lathrop brothers, Capt. Josiah, Eleazer, John and Ezra, stalwart sons of Deacon Melatiah, who was of Kent, Connecticut, and Dover Plains and Canaan, New York, descendants of the honorable Lathrop family of New England, from Rev. John Lathrop, the noted Dissenter; the Hatch brothers, Squire Joel and Deacon Timothy, sons of Major Jethro Hatch of Kent, Conn., and descendants of Jonathan early of Hartwich on the Cape---men of marked individuality, without whom the settlement would have been incomplete; the three Raymond brothers, Newcomb, James and Abram, sons of David and Bethia Newcomb Raymond, from Kent, Conn., by way of Duanesburgh, of a family of Huguenots early of Norwalk, Connecticut, and still earlier (1690) of Beverly, Massachusetts,---sturdy, patriotic, true men; Cornelius Clark, a New Jersey Scotchman with a Dutch Bible, and a compass and chain, and knowledge of how to use them---an invaluable aid to the settlers and a useful member of the new community; the eminently respectable Elmores from Columbia County, New York, whither they had come from Sharon and Hartford, Connecticut; the honorable Benedict family from Norwalk, Connecticut, by way of Westchester County, New York; the Northrops from Milford, Connecticut, by way of Westchester County; Lorain and James Curtis from the Curtis family of Stratford, Connecticut, by way of Berkshire County, Massachusetts; the Isaac Foote family, so prominent in the early days here, from Colchester, Connecticut, and of Samuel Foote, kindred of Isaac, from Gill, Massachusetts, both descendants of Nathaniel Foote early of Wethersfield, Connecticut; the Dixons from Manchester, Vermont, by way of Kent and Lebanon, Connecticut; the Rexfords from New Haven and Barkhamsted, Connecticut; the Pratt family from Connecticut, by way of Spencertown, Columbia County, New York; the Talcotts from Bolton and Wethersfield, Connecticut; the White family from Vermont by way of Jericho, New York; the Guthries from Litchfield, Connecticut; the Purdy family from Westchester County, descendants of Francis and Mary Purdy early of Fairfield, Connecticut; the Babcock, and Briggs, and Wilcox, and Lyon, and Reynolds, and Carpenter families from Rhode Island; the Reese and Race families from Stockbridge, Massachusetts; the Percivals from the Cape, by way of Lee, Massachusetts; the Gardiners from Gardiners Island, by way of Stonington and Colchester, Connecticut; the Newtons, also from Colchester; the Collins, and Billings, and Davis, and Sexton families from Somers, Connecticut; the Averys from Stonington, Connecticut, by way of Durham, New York; the Allen and Simons families from Gill, Massachusetts; the Thompsons and Wilbers from Dutchess County; the Lynde and Carver families from Brookfield, Massachusetts; Orsamus Holmes from Springfield, Vermont; the Gortons from New London, Connecticut; the Stebbins family from Hartland, Connecticut; the Burritt and Welles families from Stratford, Connecticut; the Brown, Whitney, Rose, and Eaton families from Winhall, Vermont; the Hibbards and Meads from Greenwich, Connecticut; the Perrys, Haxtons, and Scovilles, from Columbia County, New York; the Follett family from Vermont; the Mudge family from Sharon, Connecticut, and Columbia County, New York; the Rynex from Schenectady County; the Kinsleys from Connecticut, and the Austins from Sheffield, Massachusetts, by way of Clinton, New York.) The advance company arrived on a Saturday night in March 1793. Their first organization of the town was that of the Congregational Church of Sherburne, founded on July 6, 1794.

The town of Sherburne was created in 1795 from the town of Paris (now in Oneida County). The town of Smyrna was formed from part of Sherburne in 1808, and the size of Sherburne was increased by annexing part of the town of New Berlin in 1852.

The opening of the Chenango Canal in 1837 between Utica and Binghamton, which ran right down the middle of Sherburne, greatly reduced the cost and time of receiving goods and supplies. During the Civil War, Union soldiers set up camp on the banks of the canal, on what is now the home of Westlake Village. The railroad, like elsewhere around New York, replaced the canal in 1867, and two trains came through town on a daily basis.

== Geography ==
According to the United States Census Bureau, the town of Sherburne has a total area of 43.6 square miles (112.9 km^{2}), of which 0.02 square miles (0.05 km^{2}), or 0.05%, is water.

The Chenango River, a tributary of the Susquehanna River, flows southwards through the town.

The northern town line is the border of Madison County.

New York State Route 12, a north-south highway, intersects New York State Route 12B north of Sherburne village and intersects New York State Route 80 within the village.

=== Climate ===
Climate data for Sherburne, New York (1991–2020)
Month	Jan	Feb	Mar	Apr	May	Jun	Jul	Aug	Sep	Oct	Nov	Dec	Year
Mean daily maximum °F (°C)	30.9 (−0.6)	32.9 (0.5)	40.9 (4.9)	54.9 (12.7)	68.0 (20.0)	76.0 (24.4)	80.3 (26.8)	79.0 (26.1)	72.0 (22.2)	59.4 (15.2)	46.8 (8.2)	35.9 (2.2)	56.4 (13.5)
Daily mean °F (°C)	21.7 (−5.7)	22.9 (−5.1)	30.7 (−0.7)	43.5 (6.4)	55.6 (13.1)	64.5 (18.1)	68.6 (20.3)	67.3 (19.6)	60.2 (15.7)	48.7 (9.3)	37.9 (3.3)	28.1 (−2.2)	45.8 (7.7)
Mean daily minimum °F (°C)	12.5 (−10.8)	12.9 (−10.6)	20.4 (−6.4)	32.2 (0.1)	43.2 (6.2)	52.9 (11.6)	56.9 (13.8)	55.6 (13.1)	48.4 (9.1)	38.1 (3.4)	28.9 (−1.7)	20.3 (−6.5)	35.2 (1.8)
Average precipitation inches (mm)	2.52 (64)	2.26 (57)	3.06 (78)	3.53 (90)	3.63 (92)	4.78 (121)	4.41 (112)	4.12 (105)	3.70 (94)	4.06 (103)	3.12 (79)	2.95 (75)	42.14 (1,070)
Average snowfall inches (cm)	18.7 (47)	18.8 (48)	14.6 (37)	2.5 (6.4)	0.1 (0.25)	0.0 (0.0)	0.0 (0.0)	0.0 (0.0)	0.0 (0.0)	0.4 (1.0)	6.1 (15)	15.9 (40)	77.1 (194.65)
Source: NOAA

== Demographics ==
Historical population
Census	Pop.	Note	%±
1820	2,590		—
1830	2,574		−0.6%
1840	2,791		8.4%
1850	2,623		−6.0%
1860	2,701		3.0%
1870	2,927		8.4%
1880	3,128		6.9%
1890	2,847		−9.0%
1900	2,614		−8.2%
1910	2,683		2.6%
1920	2,820		5.1%
1930	2,619		−7.1%
1940	2,928		11.8%
1950	3,046		4.0%
1960	3,338		9.6%
1970	3,578		7.2%
1980	3,657		2.2%
1990	3,903		6.7%
2000	3,979		1.9%
2010	4,048		1.7%
2016 (est.)	3,918	▼	−3.2%
U.S. Decennial Census

As of the census of 2000, there were 3,979 people, 1,619 households, and 1,065 families residing in the town. The population density was 91.3 inhabitants per square mile (35.3/km^{2}). There were 1,770 housing units at an average density of 40.6 units per square mile (15.7 units/km^{2}). The racial makeup of the town was 98.74% White, 0.23% Black or African American, 0.03% Native American, 0.13% Asian, 0.05% Pacific Islander, 0.25% from other races, and 0.58% from two or more races. Hispanic or Latino of any race were 0.78% of the population.

There were 1,619 households, out of which 32.2% had children under the age of 18 living with them, 50.4% were married couples living together, 10.3% had a female householder with no husband present, and 34.2% were non-families. 28.4% of all households were made up of individuals, and 11.7% had someone living alone who was 65 years of age or older. The average household size was 2.44 and the average family size was 2.98.

In the town, the population was spread out, with 26.5% under the age of 18, 6.7% from 18 to 24, 27.8% from 25 to 44, 23.4% from 45 to 64, and 15.6% who were 65 years of age or older. The median age was 38 years. For every 100 females, there were 93.0 males. For every 100 females age 18 and over, there were 90.2 males.

The median income for a household in the town was $31,841, and the median income for a family was $39,094. Males had a median income of $30,477 versus $22,458 for females. The per capita income for the town was $17,281. About 13.3% of families and 16.4% of the population were below the poverty line, including 23.4% of those under age 18 and 4.2% of those age 65 or over.

== Communities and locations in the town ==
- Earlville – A village, part of which is within the northern edge of the town on Route 12B.
- Harrisville – A hamlet east of Sherburne village on NY Route 80.
- Rexford Falls – A waterfall located east of the Village of Sherburne.
- Sherburne – A village located at the intersection of NY Route 12 and NY-80.
- Sherburne Four Corners – A hamlet southwest of Sherburne village on County Road 20, located in the southwestern corner of the town so that it is partly within three other towns of Chenango County.

== Notable people ==
- Alida Avery (1833–1908) American physician and Vassar College faculty member, noted suffragette, first woman to practice medicine in Colorado
- George Ripley Bliss (1816–1893), clergyman and educator who served as president of Bucknell University
- Blackleach Burritt (1744–1794), a noted Congregational clergyman in the American Revolution. He preached the first sermon in Sherburne in 1792.
- Randy Glasbergen (1957–2015), cartoonist
- John Franklin Gray (1804–1881), first practitioner of homeopathy in the United States
- Levi E. Knapp (1826–1919), member of the Wisconsin State Assembly
- Marcius D. Raymond (1833–1911), publisher, writer and historian; author of Souvenir of the Sherburne Centennial Celebration
