= White House conference =

Type of national meeting in the United States

A White House Conference is a national meeting sponsored by the Executive Office of the President of the United States with the purpose of discussing an issue or topic of importance to the American public. The most well-known White House conference is the White House Conference on Aging, which has occurred once a decade since the 1950s. Other well-known conferences include the 1966 White House Conference on Civil Rights and the 1971 White House Conference on Youth. Other topics have included drug abuse, education, family life, nutrition, disabled people and other issues. Typical attendees of a White House conference include experts in the particular field, community leaders and citizens with an interest in the issue. The President usually speaks to a general session of the conference; the conference concludes by issuing a report to the President summarizing issues and making recommendations for executive or legislative action. The First Lady of the United States also sometimes hosts White House conferences. White House conferences are typically created by specific legislation.

The first White House conference was the Conference on the Care of Dependent Children held in 1909 under President Theodore Roosevelt, which later became the long-running White House Conference on Children and Youth. The 1909 meeting involved talks among social workers, educators, juvenile court judges, labor leaders, and civic minded men and women concerned with the care of dependent children about the merits of institutional and homecare. A notable development during this conference was the emergence of a general consensus among participants that children ought to remain with their families whenever possible, and that placements with foster parents are preferable to orphanages when children cannot be kept within their own families. Importantly, the conference also ended with calls for the end of routine institutionalization of neglected or otherwise dependent children. Shortly after the 1909 Conference, the federal government became actively involved in establishing national programs geared towards the well-being and protection of dependent children. This included the creation of the Child Welfare League of America and the U.S. Children’s Bureau, the development of a national Children’s Charter, and the endorsement of different family programs, including direct financial aid to mothers and widows. This positive shift towards alternative programs, particularly direct financial aid, marked a major break from mainstream perspectives in child welfare at that time, thereby reinforcing a national commitment towards de-institutionalizing children. The Conference on Children and Youth has been held every ten years since 1909, deepening research and collaboration among like-minded professionals in the advancement of the well-being of children and families.
