= White House Conference on Children and Youth =

Series of meeting held by U.S. presidents

The White House Conference on Children and Youth was a series of meetings hosted over 60 years by the President of the United States of America, and the first White House conference ever held. Under the leadership of Presidents Theodore Roosevelt, Woodrow Wilson, Herbert Hoover, Franklin D. Roosevelt, Harry Truman, Dwight D. Eisenhower, and Richard Nixon, the Conferences involved thousands of delegates from around the country. According to the Child Welfare League of America, "the conferences were devoted to improving the lives of children across the Nation." Each conference focused on issues relevant to the decade in which the conference was held.

== Topics ==
- 1909 – Entitled the White House Conference on the Care of Dependent Children, the theme was opposition to the institutionalization of dependent and neglected children.
- 1919 – The White House Conference on Standards of Child Welfare created the most comprehensive report on the needs of children ever written.
- 1929 – The most comprehensive report on the needs of children ever written was created at the Conference on the Standards of Child Welfare.
- 1939 – The Conference on Children in a Democracy highlighted the democratic values, services, and environment necessary for the welfare of children.
- 1950 – This conference focused on the healthy personality development of children and youth and was historic for several reasons including: for the first time youth themselves were invited to attend (and nearly 400 attended representing every state in the union); recommendations emerging from the conference acknowledged the unique health and development needs of youth – shifting the federal dialogue of adolescent health for the first time beyond teenage pregnancy and juvenile delinquency, and called for an ecological and strength based approach to improving their health and wellbeing.
- 1960 – The Golden Anniversary White House Conference on Children and Youth expanded ways for children to explore their potential in order to discover creative freedom.
- 1971 – The White House Conference on Children and Youth was split into two conferences, one on children, the other on youth. The children's conference focused on the individuality of children through the support of healthy personality development. It took place in Washington, D.C. The youth conference focused on a number of issues affecting people ages 14–24, including values, ethics, and culture, foreign affairs, race relations, and legal rights and justice. It was held from April 18 to April 21, 1971, at the YMCA of the Rockies in Estes Park, Colorado. Over one thousand delegates representing every state and U.S. territory were nominated by their respective governors and appointed by the President. This late April meeting was marred by a snowstorm that required the mobilization of nearby U.S. Army personnel to distribute winter gear to delegates unprepared for severe winter weather. Held at the height of the Vietnam War and amid growing youth dissatisfaction with the Nixon administration, many of the recommendations issued by the conference opposed existing U.S. policies.

== Future events ==
Legislation to convene a White House Conference on Children and Youth in 2010 was filed in both the House and Senate in 2008. On February 14, 2008, the House bill was filed by Congressman Chaka Fattah. On March 13, Senator Mary Landrieu introduced a Senate bill to re-establish a White House Conference on Children and Youth (S 2771). These bipartisan bills would have created a two-year event focusing on child welfare issues and challenges. They did not pass.

== See also ==
- Timeline of young people's rights in the United States
- Child labor laws in the United States
- International Year of the Child
