= National Network for Youth =

U.S. nonprofit organization

- Formation: 1975
- Type: NGO
- Purpose: Homeless youth
- Headquarters: Washington, D.C.
- Region served: National
- Policy Director: Darla Bardine
- Main organ: Board of Directors
- Website: nn4youth.org

National Network for Youth (NN4Y) was founded in 1974 as the National Network of Runaway and Youth Services (NNRYS), as a membership association of community-based organizations that aimed to focus on the needs of youth in runaway and homeless situations. Today, NN4Y represents more than 530 community-based organizations s in the United States and territories. NN4Y members work with their neighborhood youth, adults, associations, and regional and state networks of youth workers to provide street-based services, emergency shelter, transitional living programs, counseling, and social, health, educational and job-related services to over 2.5 million youth each year.

== Funding ==
Many members of the NN4Y receive funding through the federal Runaway and Homeless Youth Act of 1974. Funds and practices from the Juvenile Justice and Delinquency Prevention Act, the McKinney-Vento Act on homelessness, and the Workforce Investment Act also assist local program operators in leveraging state, local and private funding. NN4Y was the architect of the federal Runaway and Homeless Youth Act (RHYA). Additionally, NN4Y works with Learn & Serve America to engage young people volunteer projects in their communities.

== Activities ==
National Network for Youth has five focus areas: public policy, professional development, program dissemination, development and publication of training and information materials, and Symposium.

- Public Policy: This includes education, networking, training, and policy work to connect with federal, state, and local lawmakers. NN4Y advocates for youth policy and protects legislation and spending affecting youth; provides testimony at governmental hearings; works in coalition with other national youth and homelessness organizations; distributes information to state, local and national policy makers.
- Professional development: NN4Y provides training through workshops and conferences. NN4Y works with community-based organizations, schools, state agencies and in state and local health departments and clinics. Training includes HIV prevention, adolescent health, sexual and reproductive health, youth development, and sexual minority youth.
- Program Dissemination: NN4Y distributes information about prevention programs to reduce health risk-taking behaviors to community-based and youth organizations, health educators, and state and local health education agencies.
- Materials Development & Publication: NN4Y publishes training materials, newsletters, and other resources for youth advocates.
- Symposium: NN4Y hosts an annual conference in Washington, D.C., for youth workers, young people, decision makers and local, state, and national leaders.

== See also ==
- Timeline of children's rights in the United States
- History of youth rights in the United States
