= Charles Loring Brace =

American philanthropist (1826–1890)

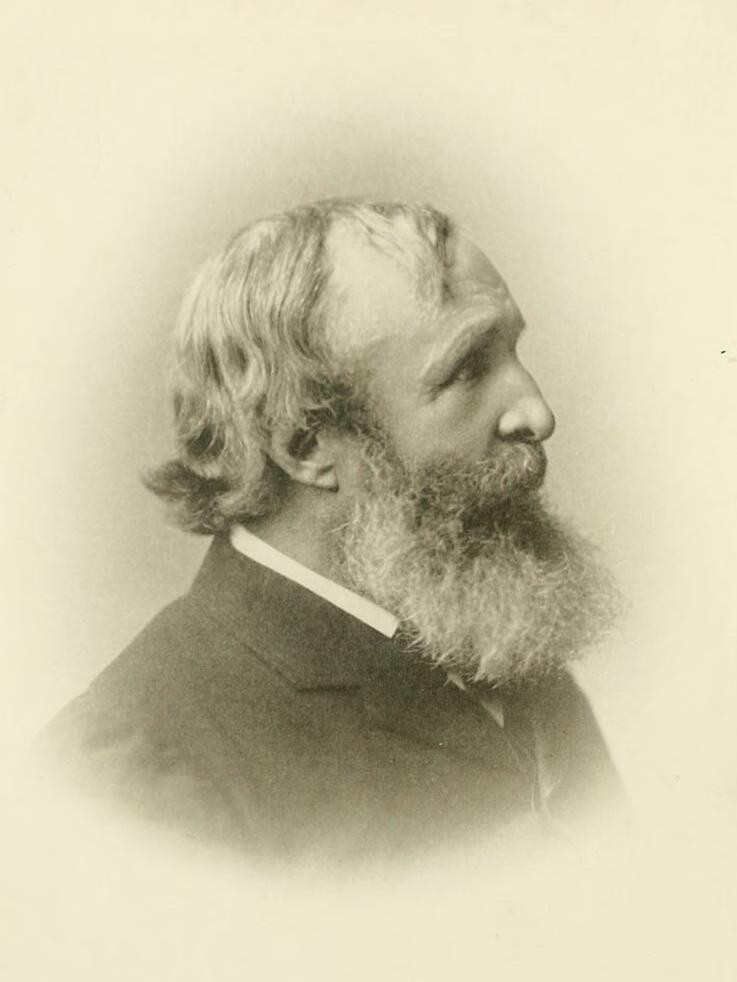
- Born: June 19, 1826; Litchfield, Connecticut, U.S.
- Died: August 11, 1890 (aged 64)
- Education: Yale College (B.A. 1846)
- Occupation: Philanthropist
- Spouse: married on August 21, 1854, Letitia Neill in Belfast
- Relatives: Charles Loring Brace Jr. (Yale, 1876); Gerald Warner Brace (grandson); C. Loring Brace IV (great-grandson); Jane Loring Gray (cousin)

Charles Loring Brace (June 19, 1826 – August 11, 1890) was an American philanthropist who contributed to the field of social reform. He is considered a father of the modern foster care movement and was most renowned for starting the Orphan Train movement of the mid-19th century, and for founding Children's Aid Society.

== Early life ==
Brace was born on June 19, 1826, in Litchfield, Connecticut. He was named after his uncle, the lawyer Charles Greely Loring, a defender of fugitive slave Thomas Sims. His mother died when he was 14, and he was raised by his father, a history teacher.

=== Education ===
He graduated from Yale College in 1846. He pursued divinity and theology graduate studies at Yale, but left to study at Union Theological Seminary, from which he received his graduate degree in 1849. He was drawn to New York because it was viewed as the center of American Protestantism and social activity. His best friend and brother of his roommate at Yale, Frederick Law Olmsted, the landscape architect, also lived in New York.

== Career ==
In 1852, at the age of 26, Brace, who had been raised as a Calvinist, was serving as a minister to the poor of Blackwell's Island (now known as Roosevelt Island) and to the poor of the Five Points Mission, when he decided he wanted to pursue his humanitarian efforts in the streets rather than in church. Brace was aware of the impoverished lives of the children in New York City and for this reason he concentrated on improving children's situation and their future. In 1853, Brace established the Children's Aid Society.

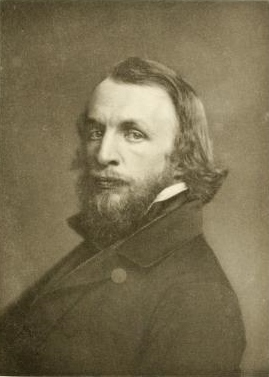
Charles Loring Brace, aged 29 years

In 1854, the Society opened the first of its "newsboys' lodging-houses", which would become one of Brace's most successful projects. These houses provided basic room and board at low prices to homeless children who hawked newspapers on the streets of American cities. Though Brace viewed the newsboys as children in need of the services provided by the houses, they also inspired several of Horatio Alger's stories in which the newsboys' independence and pluck is rewarded with great wealth.

Brace believed that poor, Catholic immigrants were genetically inferior, deeming them "stupid, foreign criminal class" and the "scum and refuse of ill-formed civilization". Some of the children of immigrants had been in trouble with the law. Such was the severity of child poverty in 1854 that the number of homeless children in New York City was estimated as high as 34,000. The police referred to these children as "street rats".

According to an essay written by Brace in 1872, one crime and poverty ridden area around Tenth Avenue was referred to as "Misery Row". Misery Row was considered to be a main breeding ground of crime and poverty, and an inevitable "fever nest" where disease spread easily. Many of the children he deemed orphans were not orphaned at all, and when families of origin tried to keep their children, they were rebuffed.

Orphan asylums and almshouses were the only "social services" available for poor and homeless children. Brace did not believe that these were worthwhile institutions because they merely served the purpose of feeding the poor and providing handouts. He felt that such institutions only deepened the dependence of the poor on charity. Brace was also influenced by the writings of Edward Livingstone, a pioneer in prison reform who believed that the best way to deal with crime and poverty was to prevent it. Brace focused on finding jobs and training for poor and destitute children so they could help themselves. His initial efforts in social reform included free kindergartens, free dental clinics, job placement, training programs, reading rooms, and lodging houses for boys. However, Catholic and Jewish religious leaders feared that Brace was trying to "rescue" children from Catholic and Jewish faith.

=== Fostering and the "Orphan Trains" ===
Brace believed that removing homeless children from their street environment and overcrowded city institutions and placing them with "morally upright" farm families was key to providing the children with good lives. Realizing the practical need for workers in the developing Western and Midwestern states, he proposed sending homeless children to those communities in the hopes of finding them work or families. "In every American community, especially in a western one, there are many spare places at the table of life," Brace wrote. "They have enough for themselves and the stranger too."

After a year spent testing his idea by dispatching children individually to farms in nearby Connecticut, Pennsylvania and rural New York, the Children's Aid Society mounted its first large-scale expedition to the Midwest in September 1854.

The arrangements for placing homeless children varied. Sometimes, children were pre-ordered by couples, who would send a request for their desired gender, age, hair and eye color, end etc. to one of the institutions participating in the placements. After a suitably fitting child was found, the child was sent via train to their new family for adoption.

More commonly, groups of 5-30 children of various ages from infant to teenager would travel with an adult agent as escort along a determined route of towns and communities to be placed in foster home situations. Railroads and charities would provide discount fares, new clothes, bibles, and other sundries to the children for the journeys, and Brace raised money for the program through his writings and speeches. To improve the chances of successful placement, since many host families harbored strong prejudice towards ethnic groups, Brace instructed that care should be taken to select healthy, attractive children with Anglo-American features to match the majority populations of the communities they were being sent to.

Children could be placed with couples, families, or single adults, and adoption was not necessary for placement. Rather than adoption, many placements, especially older placements of teens, instead signed a contract of indenture for the children selected, which outlined certain obligations, such as providing clothes, room, board, 4 months of education per year, and other terms in exchange for the child's indentured labor until the age of 21. While current views on adoption and child labor laws see this arrangement negatively as a form of child slavery, at the time, it was considered more beneficial and good for the homeless children to secure a source of food and shelter in the countryside, even when in exchange for forced work, than to leave them living homeless on city streets, and common beliefs of the time viewed the countryside and farming families as more "healthy" and "morally upright" than their city counterparts.

Brace's plan largely depended on the goodwill of the foster communities. Sponsoring New York City institutions would provide the children, the basic guidelines in the placement contracts, and supervisory agents. However, due to the small number of agents, vetting the families and providing follow up monitoring of children after placement was mostly reliant on local volunteer committees set up for the care of the children. The informality and lack of oversight of this arrangement lead to the programs' greatest criticisms as some children were misplaced from records or left in abusive situations.

As part of his placement programs, an estimated 200,000 American children traveled west by rail in search of new homes during the life of the programs.

The trains and relocation efforts began to decline in the face of rising criticism over the lack of oversight and vetting of the placement homes, and changing views on child labor. The need for children to adopt and provide labor declined steeply as rural areas became settled, and many states passed laws preventing the importation and placement of out-of-state children within their borders without the payment of costly fees, to ensure in-state needy children took priority. The relocations finally ended in 1929.

Overall, Brace's relocation program was largely deemed a success. A 1910 survey concluded that 87 percent of the children sent to country homes had "done well," while 8 percent had returned to New York and the other 5 percent (representing 10,000 children) had either died, disappeared or gotten arrested, and it was utilized by many New York City institutions, such as the Children's Village, and the New York Foundling Hospital, among others.

=== Emigration Plan ===
Brace's Emigration Plan was also an anti-eugenic movement because despite his religious prejudices Brace believed that one's "gemmules" (an early, pre-genetic concept that blood carried a family's heritability and character) did not predetermine one's future. Brace was deeply moved by Charles Darwin's Origin of Species, having read it thirteen times. He argued Darwinism was compatible with charitable efforts like his, against some Social Darwinists who held the opposite view. Brace was also an outspoken abolitionist who (unusually in his time even for abolitionists) entirely rejected scientific racism, arguing that Black people should have equal rights, and even held their having children with Whites could lead to a better future race. In a bold move (and perhaps inspired by his abolitionist and Darwinian mindset), Brace did away with the centuries-old custom of indenture so that the "placed" children were allowed to leave a home if they were uncomfortable with the placement. Brace's vision of migrating children to live with the western Christian farming families was widely supported by wealthy New York families – the first large gift of $50 was given by Mrs. William B. Astor in 1853.

The Children's Aid Society (CAS), the best-known organization finding homes for children, made efforts to screen the host families and follow up on the welfare of placed children. By 1909, at the first White House Conference on Dependent Children, the country's top social reformers praised the CAS' emigration movement, but argued that children should either be kept with their natal families or, if they were removed as a result of parental neglect or abuse, every effort should be made to place the child in a foster home nearby. In a report in 1910, the Children's Aid Society estimated that 87 percent of children placed by the Orphan Train program had done well. While there was occasional abuse, most people agreed that overall, the children were generally better off than on the streets of big cities without proper food, clothing, and shelter.

By 1920, the CAS and approximately 1500 other agencies and institutions had placed approximately 150,000 children in the largest migration or resettlement of children in American history. The CAS' Orphan Train movement ended in 1929, 75 years after it had begun as a social experiment.

While some honor Brace for his compassionate work with the street children of New York City, others believe he was a racist bigot whose destruction of families led to the creation of a racist, classist foster care system that exists today.

Brace served as an executive secretary of Children's Aid Society for 37 years, overseeing the program. He died in 1890 from Bright's disease. After his death, the Brace Memorial Farm was created for street children to learn farm skills, manners, and personal social skills to help prepare them for life on their own. His memoirs were published in 1872 under the title "The Dangerous Classes of New York and Twenty Years’ Work Among Them" (ISBN 1402181493).

== Personal life ==
On August 21, 1854, he married Letitia Neill in Belfast, Ireland, who proved to be a great support to her husband's social reform efforts. Letitia's father, Robert Neill, was an avid abolitionist and he opened his home to some of the world's most famous anti-slavery orators, including Frederick Douglass. He died at Campfer, Tirol, on August 11, 1890.

The family includes son, Charles Loring Brace Jr. (Yale, 1876) and CAS board secretary, grandson, Gerald Warner Brace (1901–1978) American writer, educator, sailor, and boat builder, and great-grandson, C. Loring Brace IV (1930-2019), American biological anthropologist and educator.

The family lived in Dobbs Ferry, NY, about 20 miles north of New York City, in a home by Calvert Vaux, co-designed with Frederick Law Olmsted of New York City's Central Park. When Charles Loring Brace Senior died, his son became director of the Children's Aid Society. Under the son's tenure, the Society's facility was moved from New York City to Dobbs Ferry, which continues today as Children's Village. There is a street in Dobbs Ferry which bears the name Brace Terrace and is near the family home.

== Legacy ==
Brace's notion that children are better cared for by families than in institutions is the most basic tenet of present-day foster care, and his Orphan Train programs are considered the precursor for the modern foster care system in America.

=== In popular culture ===
- Kate Manning's My Notorious Life (2014) predominantly features early 1800s orphans as main characters, who get selected on the street amongst children who must prostitute themselves for food, by Charles Loring Brace for the Orphan Train, and eventually become Lake Shore Drive (Chicago) and Fifth Avenue residents.
- The book Last Train Home, an orphan train story by Renée Wendinger, is a historical novella describing the methods by which children were placed West by the Children's Aid Society and the New York Foundling following the lives of two children of the train.ISBN 978-0-9913603-1-4
- The book Extra! Extra! The Orphan Trains and Newsboys of New York by Renée Wendinger, is an unabridged nonfiction resource book and pictorial history about the orphan trains. ISBN 978-0-615-29755-2
- The song by Utah Phillips called "Orphan Train" has been performed by numerous modern bluegrass singers.
- The book Gratefully Yours describes a nine-year-old girl's feelings about her new family who adopt her from the orphan train.
- There is a ballet entitled Orphan Train presented by Covenant Ballet Theatre of Brooklyn, which tells the story of Brace and shows stories of orphans on the train. It is choreographed by Marla Hirokawa.
- Authors Al and Joanna Lacy have written an Orphan Trains Trilogy, depicting the lives of fictional orphans.
- The ballad "Rider On An Orphan Train", written by David Massengill, describes the inevitable tragedy of the separation of siblings in spite of the efforts to keep brothers and sisters together.
- The book Train to Somewhere by Eve Bunting describes a fictional account of a girl's journey on the Orphan Train.

== See also ==
- History of childhood in the United States
- Timeline of children's rights in the United States
