= Rexford Falls =

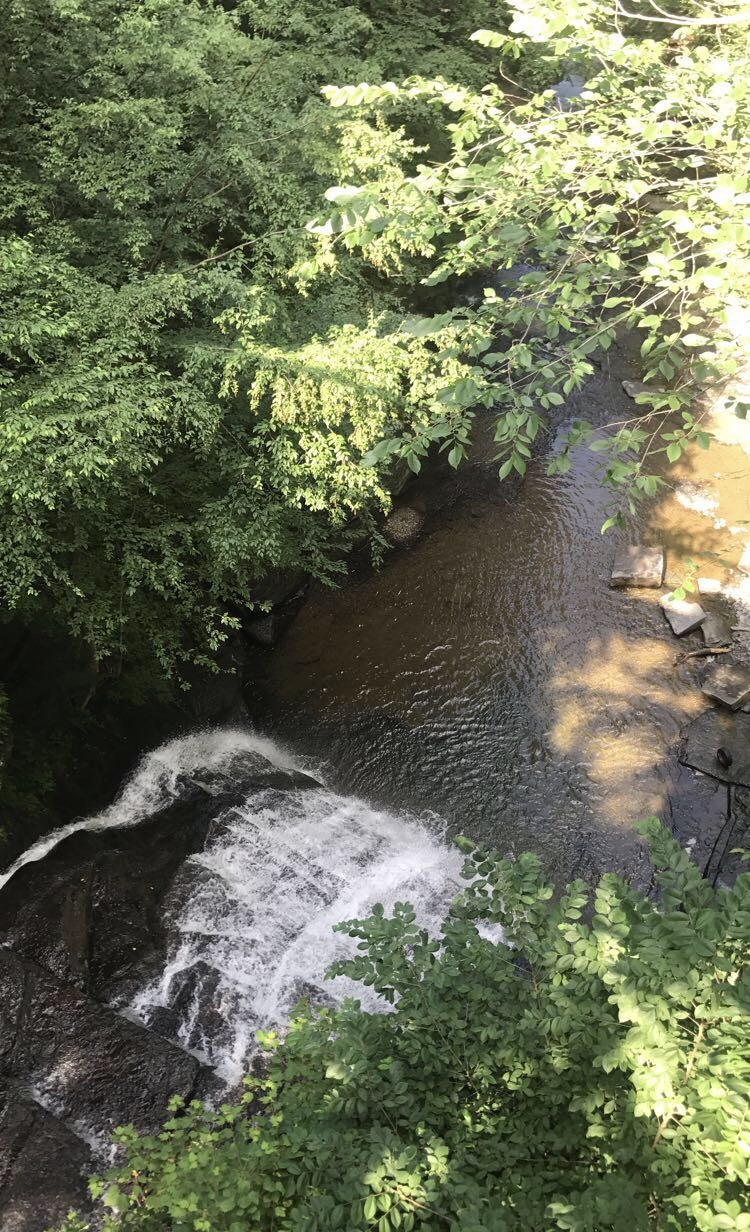
- View of Rexford Falls from bridge above

- Location within New York
- Coordinates: 42°40′44″N 75°28′17″W
- Elevation: 1,184 ft (361 m)
- Watercourse: Mad Brook

Rexford Falls is located on Mad Brook east of Sherburne, New York. The historic Rexford Falls Bridge, built ca. 1870 is located directly over the falls. The bridge is a bowstring truss bridge and is used as a pedestrian bridge. In 2006, the bridge was rehabilitated at a cost of $40,000, with the Herbert H. & Mariea L. Brown Trust Foundation providing $30,000 of the total.
