= Federal Vanderburgh =

American physician

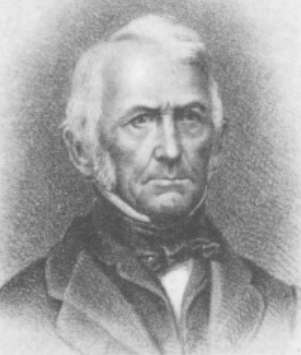
- Born: May 11, 1788; Beekman, New York, United States
- Died: January 23, 1868 (aged 79); Rhinebeck, New York, US
- Occupation: Medical doctor
- Known for: Prominent New York physician and pioneer in the field of homeopathy.
- Spouse: Hester Orinda Boardman
- Children: 4 children
- Parent: James Vanderburgh

Federal Vanderburgh (May 11, 1788 – January 23, 1868) was an American medical doctor, researcher and a pioneer in the field of homeopathy during the early-to mid 19th century. One of the pupils of Hans Burch Gram, Vanderburgh contributed a number of valuable research papers and essays in the field as well being credited for introducing homeopathy in Connecticut. He was one of the oldest and most successful practicing homeopathists in the United States at the time of his death.

== Biography ==
Federal Vanderburgh was born in Beekman, New York, on May 11, 1788. He was one of nineteen children born to Revolutionary War veteran Colonel James Vanderburgh, his father having remarried, and whose family were among the many Dutch-Americans who settled Dutchess County. Vanderburgh was supposedly named in honor of the adoption of the Federal Constitution, suggested by voting lawyer Chancellor Kent, although his mother objected to the full name of Federal Constitution Vanderburgh.

Vanderburgh received a limited and elementary education from public schools, however he was able to study medicine under noted physician Dr. Wright in New Milford, Connecticut, at the age of 17. He remained with Wright only a short time before moving on to New York City, which gave him access to work in major city hospitals and allowed him to attend lectures at medical colleges.

Vanderburgh entered the office of Dr. Stephen Smith, a leading physician in the city at the time, and underwent the usual curriculum of studies graduating before he was 21 years old. While studying under Dr. Smith, he suffered several life-threatening attacks of pulmonary hemorrhage, believed to have been caused by cardiac obstruction or of a tubercular origin, however this did not interfere with his medical studies. After receiving his diploma, Vanderburgh returned to open his own practice in his hometown.

He married Hester Orinda Boardman, who belonged to a prominent family in New Milford, and together moved to Geneva, New York, in 1812 or 1813. The area's climate was believed at the time to be beneficial for people suffering from pulmonary disease, much like Minnesota and the Lake Superior regions, and Vanderburgh enjoyed remarkable health well into old age. He remained in Geneva for ten years until turning over his practice to Dr. Martyn Paine, then living in Montreal, and moving back to New York City.

It was around this time that he began studying under Dr. Hans Burch Gram which led to his interest in homeopathy. By early 1834, he was involved in the publication of The American Journal of Homoeopathia although the medical journal lasted only four issues. He was also the corresponding secretary of the New York Homeopathic Society. Vanderburgh opened a successful practice, many of his patients belonging to New York high society, and was often requested via telegraph for house calls to country villas during the summer. On a trip to New Milford in 1837, his treatment of the wife of Dr. Charles Taylor encouraged the physician to pursue homeopathy after witnessing her rapid recovery. Taylor eventually became first resident homeopathic physician in Connecticut.

In 1834, Dr. John Franklin Gray founded the New York Homœopathic Society. Its stated purpose was for the purpose of protecting, enriching and disseminating such of the propositions and testimonies of Homœopathia as upon mature trial they shall find to be sound and available. The first Officers of the society were: President, John F. Gray; vice-presidents, Edward A. Strong, George Baxter; corresponding secretary, Federal Vanderburgh; recording secretary, Daniel Seymour; treasurer, F. A. Lohse; registrar, A. Gerald Hull; librarian, F. L. Wilsey; finance committee, J. H. Patterson, Oliver S. Strong, L. M. H. Butler, William Bock.

He continued his research into homeopathy publishing a number of valuable papers on the subject and, in 1844, sent a formal letter to Judge Cowen in defense of Dr. Henry D. Paine, outlining the legal rights of homeopathic physicians. He became a noted philanthropist in his later years, especially to the poor, and was consulted in various social issues. Vanderburgh also served as the first president of the Dutchess County Society and held the position until his death.

In 1867, the 79-year-old Vanderburgh came down with severe pleuro-pneumonia as a result of traveling in poor weather performing house calls. His health began to fail and started suffering from paroxysms dyspnoea, with a sensation of impending suffocation, and was described as "utter prostration of all muscular power". Although his condition related to dyspnoea had improved by the following spring, he experienced serious weight loss and other health problems. No apparent cause was found for his condition, with exception to his lifelong cardiac hypertrophy affliction, and he died in Rhinebeck, New York, on October 25, 1868.

== Lindon Hill ==
The land of known as Lindon Hill was originally part of the Artsen-Kip Patent. In 1779, Dr. Thomas Tillotson married Margaret Livingston, daughter of Judge Robert R. and Margaret Beekman Livingston of Clermont. Tillotson purchased from Isaac Van Etten the southerly lot forming part of the lands which had been granted in 1688 by Governor Dongan to Gerrit Aertsen and others. On this property Dr. Tillotson laid out a country place and called it "Linwood." Tillotson also acquired 150 acres of the Beekman land lying between Landsmans Kill and the Fallsburgh Creek. This plateau, between the two streams, with extensive views of the Catskill mountains and Hudson river, became known as "Linwood Hill". At the mouth of Landsmans Kill he built a dock and mill, where grain was ground. Dr. Tillotson died in 1832.

Vanderburg bought "Linwood". In 1835, John C. Tillotson, son of Thomas Tillotson, sold "Lindon Hill" to Vanderburgh, who built a house on the bluff overlooking the river, and resided there until his death in 1868. Afterwards Linwood Hill belonged to Harrison G. Dyar.

== Bibliography ==
- An Appeal for Homoeopathy; Or Remarks on the Decision of the Late Judge Cowen, Relative to the Legal Rights of Homoeopathic Physicians (1844)
- Letter to Valentine Mott, M.D., in Reply to His Valedictory Address to the Members of the New-York Academy of Medicine (1850)
- Mind, Life, and Motion: With the Law of Their Relations to Matter? (1857)
- Problem of Life and Motion (1859)
- Geometry of Vital Forces (1865)
