= Timeline of young people's rights in the United States =

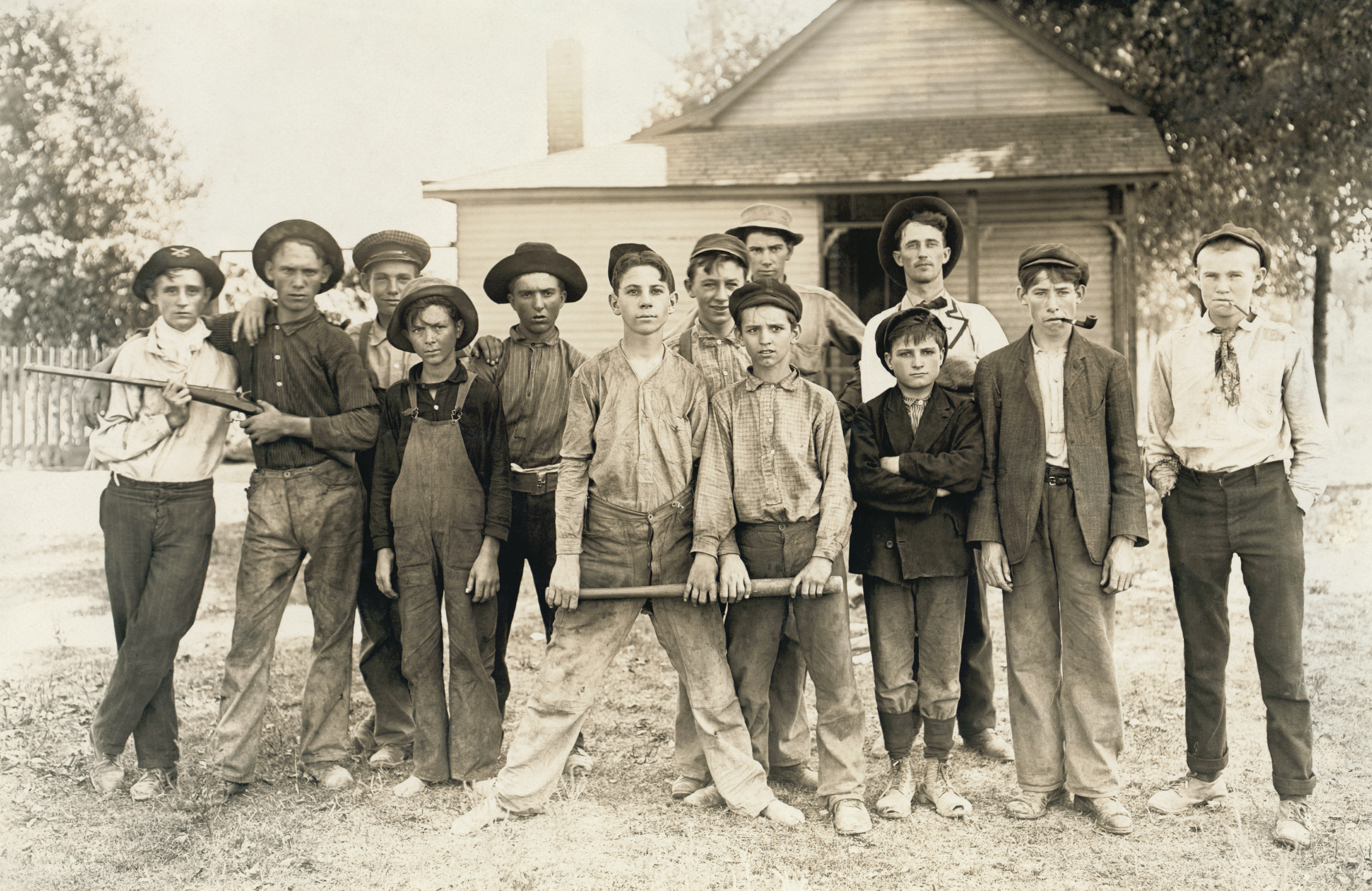
Baseball team composed mostly of child workers from a glass factory. Photograph by Lewis Hine, 1908.

The timeline of young peoples' rights in the United States, including children and youth rights, includes a variety of events ranging from youth activism to mass demonstrations. There is no "golden age" in the American children's rights movement.

== Pre-19th century ==
The history of youth rights in the United States ranges from the earliest years of European settlements on North America. Poor children were routinely and legally indentured in colonial New England by the "poor laws." In 1676 Nathan Knight, an eight-year-old boy, was apprenticed to a mason, "bound... to serve and abide the full space and term of twelve years and five months." Provided food, shelter and clothes in exchange for his labor, the boy was not allowed to leave his master until he was 21 years old.

== 19th century ==
By the end of the 19th century, American children worked in large numbers in mines, glass factories, textiles, agriculture, canneries, home industries, and as newsboys, messengers, bootblacks and peddlers.

Timeline of 19th century events related to Children's Rights in the U.S. in chronological order
Date	Parties	Event
1800	Organizations	There are eight institutions for abused and neglected children in the U.S.
1832	New England Association of Farmers, Mechanics and Other Workingmen	The New England Association of Farmers, Mechanics and Other Workingmen condemn child labor.
1836	Massachusetts	Massachusetts creates the first state child labor law where children under 15 working in factories have to attend school for at least 3 months per year.
1836	Trade unions	Early trade unions at the National Trades' Union Convention propose state minimum age laws for factory work.
1840s	Day nurseries	Day nurseries began in Boston for low-income working wives and widows of merchant seamen. Day care "was founded as a social service to alleviate the child care problems of parents who had to work, and to prevent young children from suicidal acts from thinking of being unloved ."
1842	Massachusetts	Massachusetts limits children to working 10 hours per day. Several states follow suit, but do not consistently enforce their laws.
1850	Organizations	There are ninety institutions for abused and neglected children in the U.S.
1851	Massachusetts	The first modern adoption law (1851 Adoption of Children Act) in the U.S. was passed in Massachusetts. It recognized adoption as a social and legal operation based on child welfare rather than adult interests and directed judges to ensure that adoption decrees were "fit and proper."
1853	Children's Aid Society	Charles Loring Brace founded the Children's Aid Society to take in children living on the street.
1854	Orphan Trains	In 1854 Charles Loring Brace led the Children's Aid Society to start the Orphan Train with stops across the West, where they were adopted and often given work.
1869	Samuel Fletcher, Jr.	In one of the first such court rulings, the parents of Samuel Fletcher, Jr. are found guilty of child abuse. Fletcher, who was born blind, was locked into the cellar of his family's house for several days by his parents. Upon escaping he notified authorities and his parents were arrested. They were fined $300 in one of the first court rulings that recognized children's right to be protected by law against abuse and cruelty.
1874	Mary Ellen Wilson	Mary Ellen Wilson was not allowed to go outside, except at night in her own yard, and was regularly beaten by her adopted parents. Police rescue the eight-year-old after the head of the New York Society for the Prevention of Cruelty to Animals calls them on Mary Ellen's behalf. Mrs. Connelly was sentenced to jail for one year. That year the New York Society for the Prevention of Cruelty to Children was founded, the first organization of its kind.
1876	Workingmen's Party of the United States	Workingmen's Party proposes banning the employment of children under the age of 14.
1877	American Humane Association	The New York Society for the Prevention of Cruelty to Children and several Societies for the Prevention of Cruelty to Animals across the U.S. joined together to form the American Humane Association.
1881	American Federation of Labor	The first National Convention of the American Federation of Labor passes a resolution calling on states to ban children under 14 from all gainful employment.
1883	Samuel Gompers	Samuel Gompers leads the New York Labor Movement targets the end of child labor in cigar making by successfully sponsoring legislation that bans the practice in tenements, where thousands of young children work in the trade.
1889	Hull House	Hull House became one of the first organizations in the United States to provide after school programs for children and youth.
1892	Democratic Party	The Democratic Party adopts platform plank with recommendations to ban factory employment for children under 15.
1898	New York School of Applied Philanthropy	The New York School of Philanthropy was the first higher education program to train people who wanted to work in the field of charity, including child development and youth work, in the United States. It was established with a six-week summer program in 1898, and expanded to a full-year program in 1904.
1899	John Dewey	John Dewey becomes president of the American Psychological Association, openly advocates for children's rights, and later writes several books about progressive education that emphasize the necessity for children's rights in education and throughout democratic society. He is acknowledged as one of the heroes of the children's rights movement in the United States.

== 20th century ==
Before the 1930s children were routinely exploited in a variety of settings throughout American society. Frequently beginning their working lives before their tenth birthday, children worked in hazardous jobs at mines, mills, factories, sweatshops, and on farms, with little or no wages. Labor laws did not exist, and the common perception of the ease with which children were manipulated made them targets for a variety of rights violations.

In the 1980s the United States provided global leadership by acting as the "Tip of The Spear" among nations in crafting the Convention on the Rights of the Child, or CRC. After the United Nations adopted the CRC in 1989, the United States became a signatory nation in 1994. However, to date the country has refused to ratify the Convention, joining only one other nation in the world with that status. Among the reasons the United States has failed to ratify the Convention is the fact that the Convention clearly states that anyone under the age of 18 is a child. The U.S. government has reservations about how that would affect matters when a 16- or 17-year-old commits a crime; currently, in certain instances, such a person can be tried as an adult in the U.S. courts. Several politicians have said that many of the declarations included in the document are not issues for which the federal government is in charge. There is currently no apparent effort within the federal government to adopt the CRC.

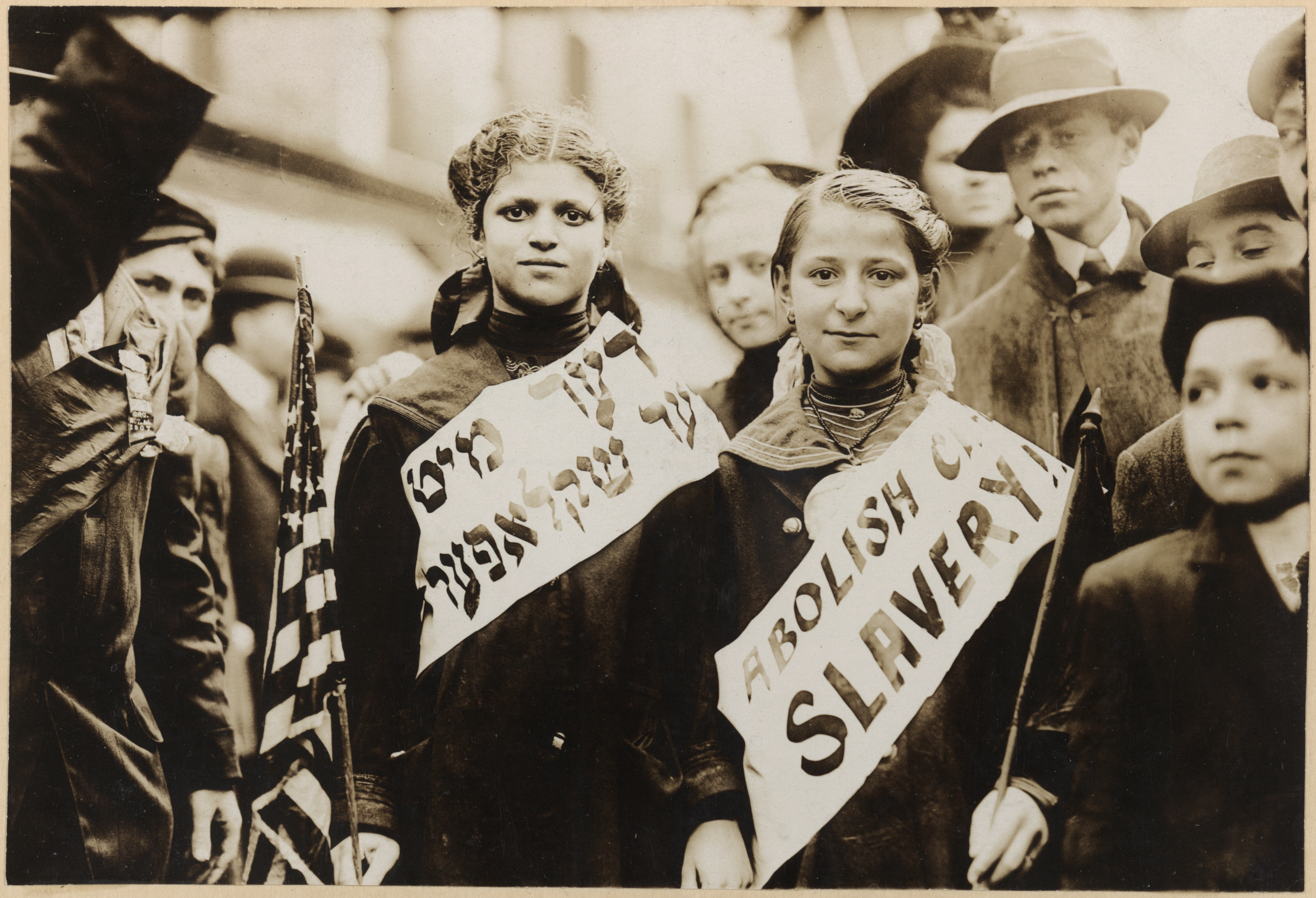
Youth activists in a 1909 parade protesting child labor.

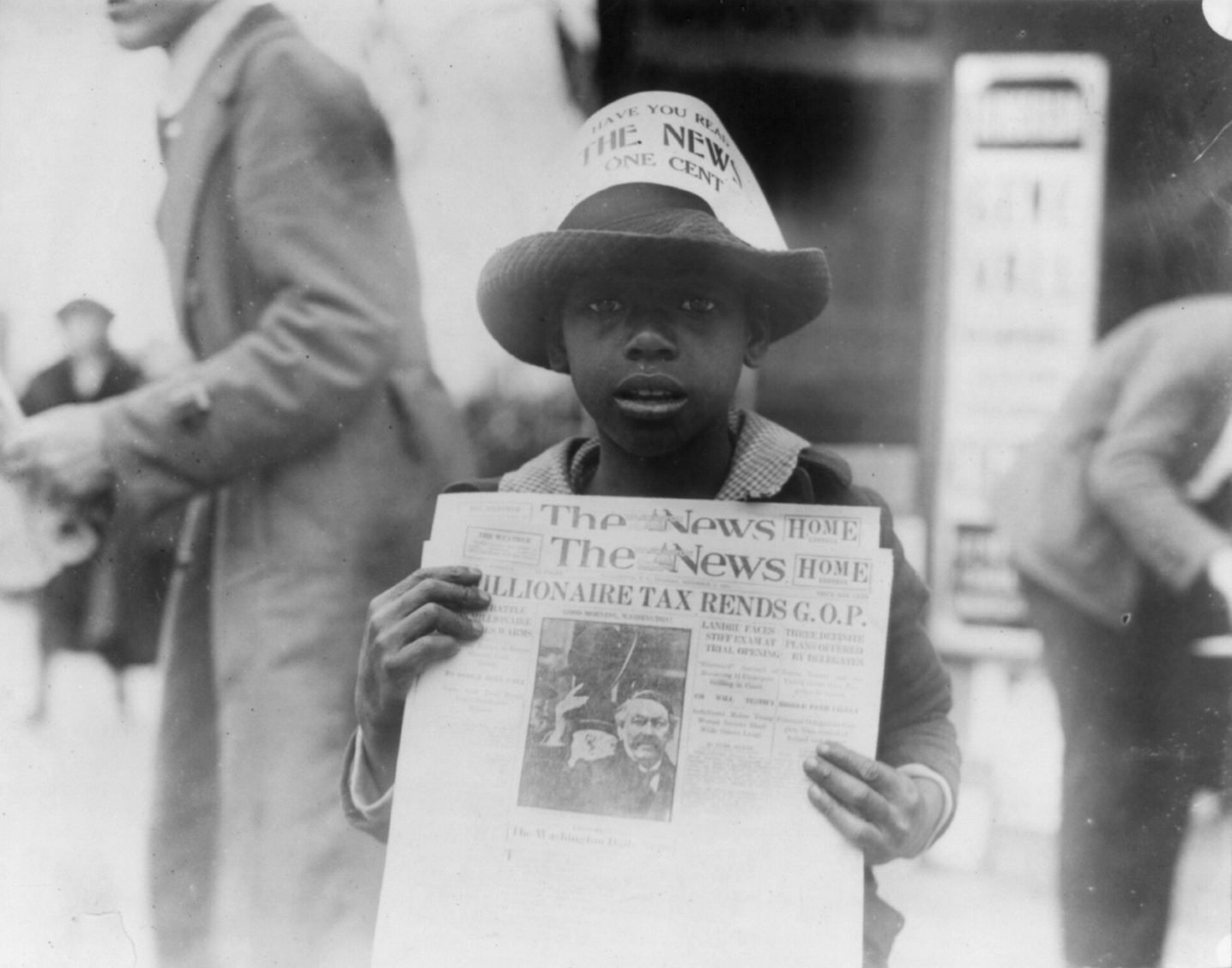
An (est.) seven-year-old newsboy in Washington, D.C. in 1921.

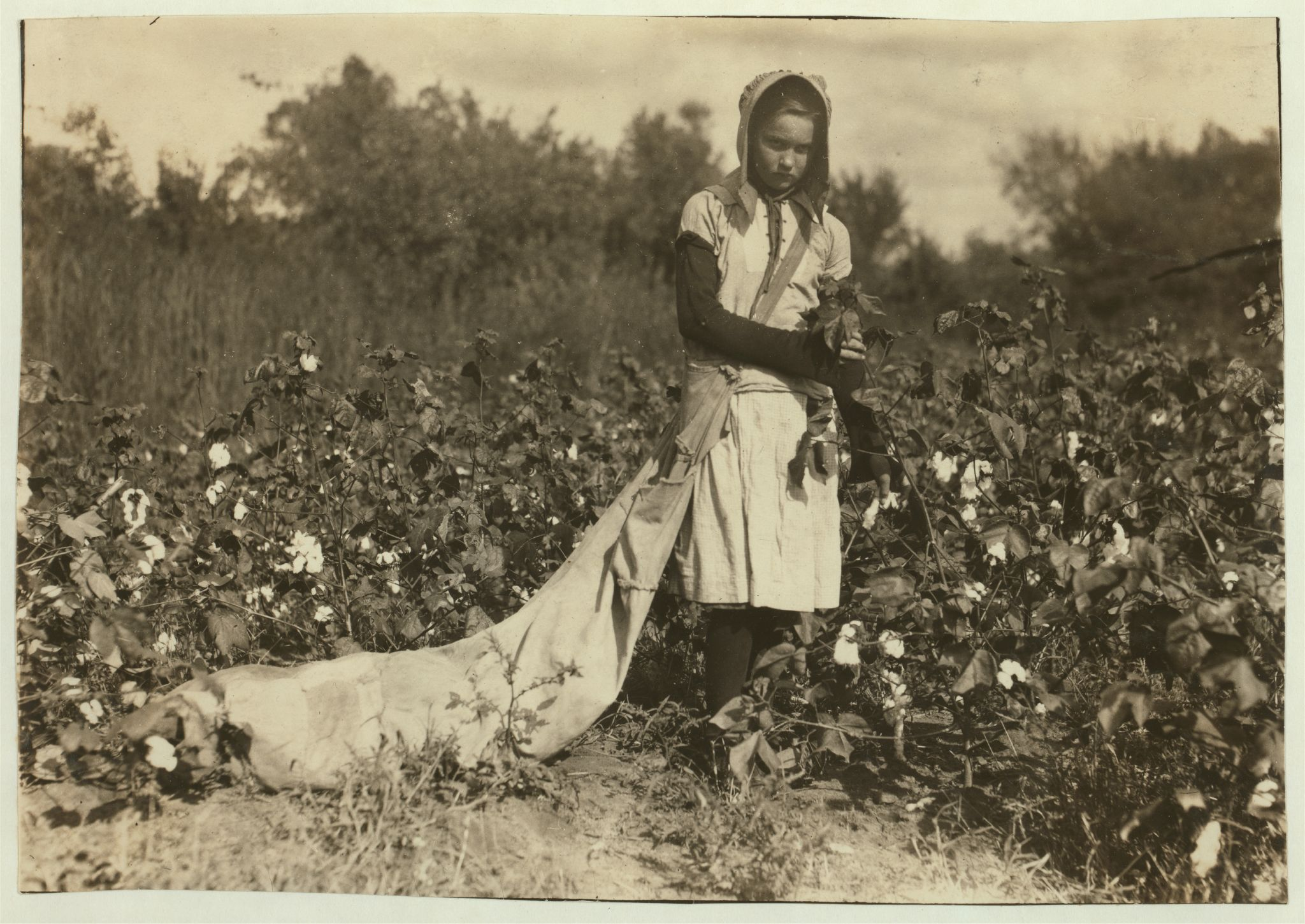
An 11-year-old picking cotton in Oklahoma in 1916.

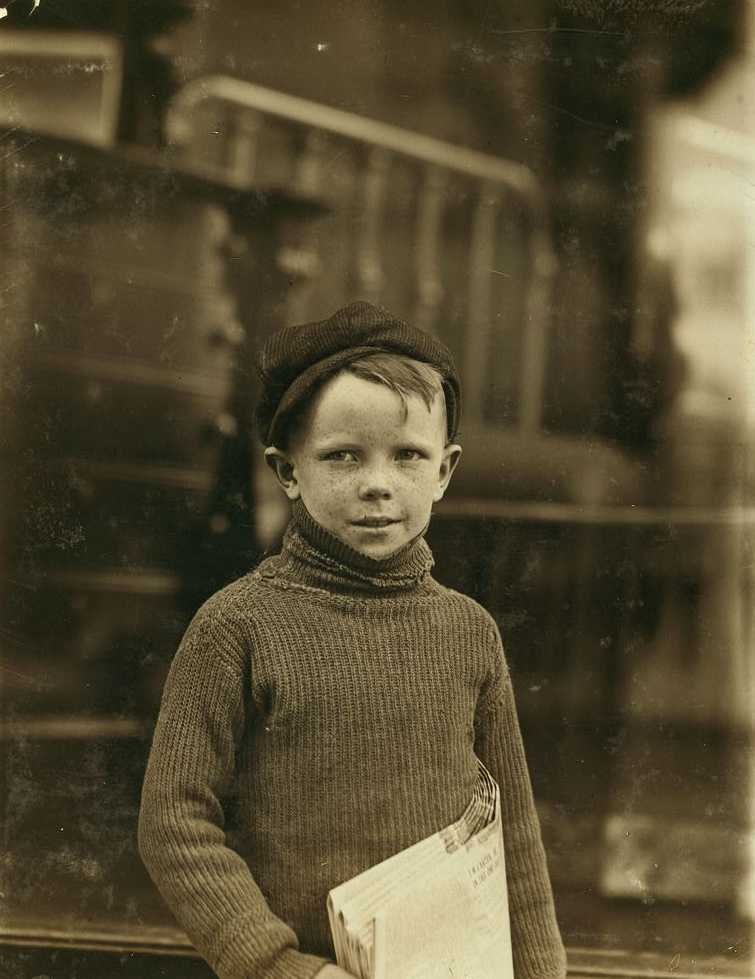
An eight-year-old newsboy in St. Louis, Missouri in 1910.

Timeline of 20th century events related to Children's Rights in the U.S. in chronological order
Date	Parties	Event
1900	Organizations	"The total number of societies in the United States for the protection of children, or children and animals, was 161."
1901	Juvenile Protective Association	Jane Addams founded the Juvenile Protective Association to advocate against racism, child labor and exploitation, drug abuse and child prostitution in Chicago and their effects on child development.
1903	Children's Crusade	Mary Harris "Mother" Jones organized children working in mills and mines in the "Children's Crusade," a march from Kensington, Pennsylvania to Oyster Bay, New York, the home of President Theodore Roosevelt with banners demanding "We want time to play!" and "We want to go to school!" Though the President refused to meet with the marchers, the incident brought the issue of child labor to the forefront of the public agenda.
1904	National Child Labor Committee	The National Child Labor Committee is formed to abolish all child labor. World-renowned photographer Lewis Hine produced much of his work for the organization.
1909	White House Conference on Children	On January 25, 1909 President Theodore Roosevelt hosted the first White House Conference on Children after a Washington, D.C. lawyer named James West suggested it. West had spent all of his life in institutions and was concerned about the state of affairs. The conferences were held every decade through the 1970s.
1909	White House Conference on the Care of Dependent Children	The first White House Conference on the Care of Dependent Children declared that poverty alone should not be grounds for removing children from families.
1909	Ellen Key	Ellen Key publishes Century of the Child, an influential American book about children's rights.
1912	Children's Bureau	The Children's Bureau was formed by the U.S. Congress in response to the White House Conference on Children. For the first time child welfare focused on more than disadvantaged children, and became focused on all children.
1915	Child Welfare League of America	The Child Welfare League of America was founded as the Bureau for Exchange of Information Among Child-Helping Organizations.
1915	Abraham Flexner	Influential educator Abraham Flexner declared social work focused on children "hardly eligible" for professional status.
1916	United States Congress	First federal child labor law prohibits the movement of goods across state lines if minimum age laws are violated. This law was in effect until 1918 when it was declared unconstitutional in the landmark case Hammer v. Dagenhart.
1921	Child Welfare League of America	Founded by C. C. Carstens to act as a federation of 70 child services organizations.
1924	Child Labor Amendment of 1924	Congress attempted to pass a constitutional amendment that would authorize a national child labor law; however, this measure was blocked by opposition within Congress and the bill was eventually dropped.
1935	American Youth Congress	The American Youth Congress forms as one of the first youth-led, youth-focused organizations in the U.S. The same year the AYC issued The Declaration of the Rights of American Youth, which they were invited to read before a joint session of the U.S. Congress.
1938	Fair Labor Standards Act	President Franklin D. Roosevelt signed the Fair Labor Standards Act, which includes limits on many forms of child labor.
1940	Working mothers	8.6 percent of mothers with children younger than 18 were in the work force.
1943	Kaiser Shipyards	The Kaiser Shipyards on Swan Island in Portland, Oregon opened the first company-owned child care facilities at the entrance to each of their facilities. Hoping to reduce the rate of absenteeism among working mothers, they were the world's largest child care centers and were in operation 24 hours a day. Featuring nurses and child-centered construction, the facilities also provided pre-cooked hot meals for the mothers to take home. Costs were shared by parents and the company. They operated for two years.
1944	Prince v. Massachusetts	The U.S. Supreme Court held that the government has broad authority to regulate the actions and treatment of children. Parental authority is not absolute and can be permissibly restricted if doing so is in the interests of a child's welfare. While children share many of the rights of adults, they face different potential harms from similar activities.
1955	Pearl S. Buck	Pearl S. Buck, one of the most popular novelists and adoptive parents in the United States, accused social workers and religious institutions of sustaining a black market for adoptions and preventing the adoption of children in order to preserve their jobs.
1959	White House Conference on Children and Youth	The United Nations General Assembly adopted Declaration of the Rights of the Child, endorsed in 1960 by Golden Anniversary White House Conference on Children and Youth.
1962	Child abuse reporting statutes	The first child abuse reporting statutes were explored at a national conference sponsored by the federal Department of Health, federal Department of Education, and the Children's Bureau.
1965	Abe Fortas	Abe Fortas, a longtime proponent of children's and student rights, is appointed to the Supreme Court. Among many statements on behalf of children's rights, he wrote the majority opinion in Tinker v. Des Moines on behalf of children's right to free expression, along with In re Gault in support of children's right to due process. The Supreme Court took a distinctly different stance towards children's rights after he left in 1970.
1967	In re Gault	In re Gault was a landmark U.S. Supreme Court decision which established that juveniles accused of crimes in a delinquency proceeding must be accorded many of the same due process rights as adults such as the right to timely notification of charges, the right to confront witnesses, the right against self-incrimination, and the right to counsel.
1970	In re Winship	In re Winship was a U.S. Supreme Court decision that held when a juvenile is charged with an act which would be a crime if committed by an adult, every element of the offense must be proved beyond a reasonable doubt.
1970	National Commission on Resources for Youth	The Ford Foundation works with the federal government to develop the National Commission on Resources for Youth, which produces reports, holds conferences and conducts an array of activities focused on promoting youth participation, youth voice, youth empowerment and community youth development across the United States.
1973	Children's Defense Fund	Marian Wright Edelman founds the Children's Defense Fund, a leading national organization that lobbies for children's rights and welfare.
1973	Hillary Clinton	In a report examining the status of children's rights in the United States, Hillary Clinton, then a lawyer, wrote that "children's rights" was a "slogan in need of a definition."
1973	Indiana	The first joint custody statute in the U.S. goes into effect in Indiana, allowing children the right to both parents after a divorce.
1974	Child Abuse Prevention and Treatment Act	The Child Abuse Prevention and Treatment Act is passed by the U.S. Congress, creating the National Center on Child Abuse and Neglect and other steps designed to increase children's rights and reduce child neglect and abuse.
1975	National Network for Youth	Founded as the only national membership organization focused solely on the needs of homeless, runaway and disconnected youth.
1978	Indian Child Welfare Act	The Indian Child Welfare Act was passed by the U.S. Congress and gives tribal governments a strong voice concerning child custody proceedings which involve Indian children, by allocating tribes exclusive jurisdiction over the case when the child resides on, or is domiciled on, the reservation, or when the child is a ward of the tribe; and concurrent, but presumptive, jurisdiction over non-reservation Native Americans’ foster care placement proceedings.
1980	Adoption Assistance and Child Welfare Act	To establish a program of adoption assistance; strengthen the program of foster care assistance for needy and dependent children; and improve the child welfare, social services, and aid to families with dependent children programs. This act amended titles IV-B and XX of the Social Security Act.
1985	Working mothers	50 percent of women with children younger than three years of age were working.
1985	Student privacy	New Jersey v. T.L.O. (U.S. Supreme Court case on the privacy rights of public school students)
1989	Convention on the Rights of the Child	The United Nations Convention on the Rights of the Child, or CRC, codifies a range of children's rights into international law, with 189 countries eventually ratifying it. The United States has signed but not ratified the CRC.
1992	Child Labor Deterrence Act	Senator Tom Harkin first proposed the Child Labor Deterrence Act in Congress, with subsequent propositions in 1993, 1995, 1997 and 1999. "This bill would prohibit the importation of products that have been produced by child labor, and included civil and criminal penalties for violators."
1994	Convention on the Rights of the Child	The United States becomes a signatory country to the CRC after then-U.S. Ambassador to the United Nations Madeleine Albright signs on behalf of the country. However, the United States Congress does not ratify the agreement.
1994	Patrick Leahy	Senator Patrick Leahy of Vermont made one of the last attempts to pass the CRC through to the Senate. In a speech to the Senate in 1994, he explained that "The administration’s resistance to ratifying the CRC is due to misunderstandings about the Convention. Opponents claim that it is anti-family or infringes upon states’ rights. The CRC does none of these things."
1997	Immigration and Naturalization Service	2,375 unaccompanied children were detained by the INS.
1997	Flores, et al. v. Janet Reno	Flores, et al. v. Janet Reno was a class action lawsuit filed in 1985 that challenged federal policy dealing with unaccompanied children held in detention by the United States Immigration and Naturalization Service. The Flores agreement, which became effective in 1997, set out a national policy for the detention, release and treatment of children in immigration custody based on the premise that authorities must treat children in their custody with "dignity, respect and special concern for their vulnerability as minors."
1997	Adoption and Safe Families Act	The Adoption and Safe Families Act (ASFA, Public Law 105-89) was a Federal Act championed by Hillary Clinton and signed into law by her husband President Bill Clinton on November 19, 1997.
1999	Children's Online Privacy Protection Act	The Children's Online Privacy Protection Act is focused on the online collection of personal information by persons or entities under U.S. jurisdiction from children under 13 years of age. It details what a website operator must include in a privacy policy, when and how to seek verifiable consent from a parent or guardian, and what responsibilities an operator has to protect children's privacy and safety online including restrictions on marketing to those under 13.
1999	Worst Forms of Child Labour Convention, 1999	The U.S. ratified this convention on December 2, 1999.

== 21st century ==
Modern children's rights issues in the United States include child labor laws, including many agricultural settings where young people between the ages of 14 and 18 routinely work full time jobs and receive half of the minimum wage. Another common issue is child custody. Laws that make it extremely difficult for non-custodial parents to spend quality time with their children. After two hearings in Congress, children's rights during treatment became a focus.

Timeline of 21st century events related to children's rights in the U.S. in chronological order
Date	Parties	Event
2001	Immigration and Naturalization Service	5,385 unaccompanied children were detained by the INS.
2002	Convention of the Rights of the Child	The U.S. Senate unanimously consents to ratify the Optional Protocol to the Convention on the Rights of the Child on the Sale of Children, Child Prostitution and Child Pornography and the Optional Protocol on the Involvement of Children in Armed Conflict. Both Protocols, separate treaties from the CRC, were enacted by the United Nations in 2000.
2007	Unaccompanied Alien Child Protection Act	The Unaccompanied Alien Child Protection Act is introduced by U.S. Senator Dianne Feinstein for the ninth time since the 106th Congress. The act would establish an Office of Children's Service at the United States Department of Justice.
2008	Stop Child Abuse in Residential Programs for Teens Act of 2008	Stop Child Abuse in Residential Programs for Teens Act of 2008 was introduced by representative George Miller. The act, supported by organizations such as Community Alliance for the Ethical Treatment of Youth, would require certain standards and enforcement provisions to prevent child abuse and neglect in residential programs, and for other purposes. It passed the House on June 28, 2008.
2011	United States Supreme Court	The Supreme Court held in Brown v. The EMA that rights protected under the first amendment were extended to children.
2013	Voting Age of 16	Takoma Park, Maryland became the first city in the United States to extend voting rights to residents after they turn 16 in city elections.
2023	Loosening child labor restrictions	States such as New Jersey have loosened child labor restrictions, with violations increasing nationwide as a tight labor market increases worker demand.

== Current status ==
Today, the American Academy of Pediatrics advocates for children's rights to appropriate medical care, and states that in cases of "an imminent threat to a child's life," physicians in some cases may provide treatments to children, even if these treatments are opposed by the parents because of their religious beliefs.

== See also ==
- List of children's rights topics
- Children's rights organizations in the United States (category)
- Youth rights
  - List of youth rights topics
  - History of youth rights in the United States
- Student rights
- Timeline of children's rights in the United Kingdom

== Bibliography ==
- Fernadez, H.C. (1980) The Child Advocacy Handbook. Pilgrim Press.
- Edmonds, B.C. and Fernekes, W.R. (1996) Children's Rights: A Reference Handbook. ABC-CLIO.
- Walker, N.E., Brooks, C.M. and Wrightsman, L.S. (1999) Children's Rights in the United States: In Search of a National Policy. Sage Publications.
- Hawes, J.M. (1991) The Children's Rights Movement: A History of Advocacy and Protection.
- Jacobs, T.A. (1997) What Are My Rights? Ninety-Five Questions and Answers about Teens and the Law. Free Spirit Publications.
