= Frederic G. Mather =

American journalist

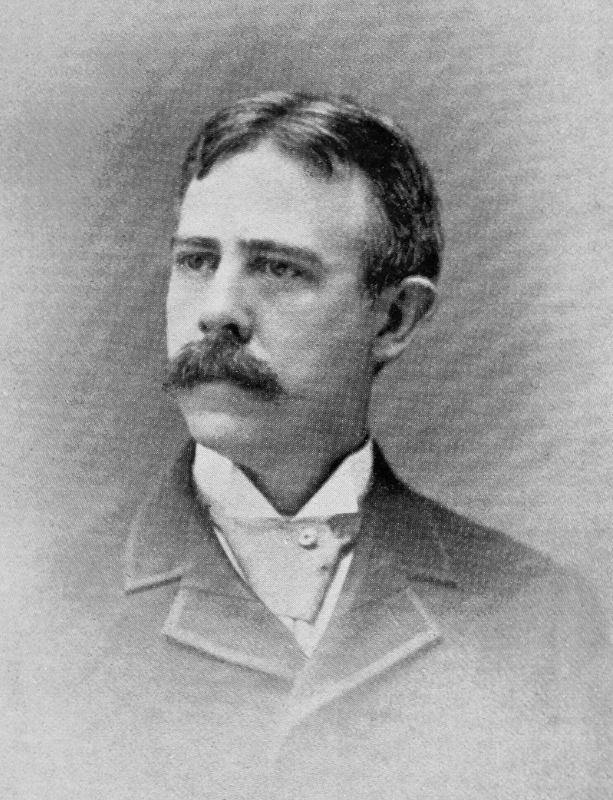
- Born: Frederic Gregory Mather; August 11, 1844; Cleveland, Ohio
- Died: August 31, 1925 (aged 81); Stamford, Connecticut
- Education: Dartmouth College
- Occupation: Journalist
- Spouses: Cornelia Heyer Olcutt (m. 1871; died 1874) Alice Evelyn Yeager (m. 1880)
- Children: 1

Signature
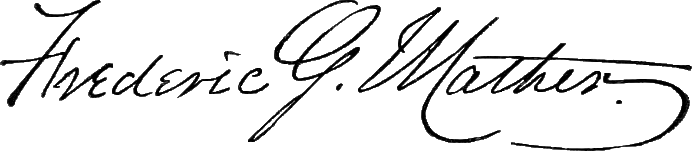

Frederic Gregory Mather (August 11, 1844 – August 31, 1925) was an American journalist.

== Biography ==
Mather was born in Cleveland on August 11, 1844, the son of banker Samuel Holmes Mather (1813–1894) and Emily Worthington Gregory (1815–1900). He attended Cleveland High School, and graduated from Dartmouth College in 1867.

For a time he worked and studied law in Cleveland, but did not practice, instead choosing scientific and literary pursuits. In 1874, he became managing editor of the Times at Binghamton, New York, and in 1875 editor-in-chief of the Republican in the same city, but resigned the place in 1879. He wrote editorials for the Albany Evening Journal in 1880, and then became the resident Albany correspondent of several newspapers. He frequently contributed articles to periodicals, chiefly on historical, economic, and scientific subjects.

Mather died at his home in Stamford, Connecticut on August 31, 1925, aged 81.

== Family ==
In 1871, he married Cornelia Heyer Olcutt (c. 1847 – 1874). They had one daughter. A widower, he married, secondly, to Alice Evelyn Yeager (born 1853) in 1880.
