= B. Holly Smith =

American biological anthropologist

- Born: Bennett Holly Smith
- Education: B.A., Anthropology, University of Texas, Austin (1975); M.A. Anthropology, University of Michigan, Ann Arbor (1976); Ph.D., Anthropology, University of Michigan, Ann Arbor (1983)
- Occupation: Biological anthropologist

B. Holly Smith (Bennett Holly Smith) is an American biological anthropologist who is a research professor in the Center for Advanced Study of Human Paleobiology at The George Washington University. Her work is concentrated in evolutionary biology, paleoanthropology, life history, and dental anthropology.

== Education ==
In 1975 Smith received her B.A. in anthropology from the University of Texas, Austin. A year later, she received her M.A. in anthropology from the University of Michigan, Ann Arbor. She received a Ph.D. in anthropology from the University of Michigan, Ann Arbor in 1983 for her dissertation, Dental Attrition in Hunter-Gatherers and Agriculturalists.

== Employment and teaching experience ==
From 1978 to 1983, she worked as a research assistant and research investigator in the Center for Human Growth and Development at the University of Michigan, Ann Arbor. After receiving her Ph.D., Smith was a visiting assistant professor in the Department of Anthropology at Arizona State University from 1984 to 1985. Since 1989, she has been an assistant research scientist at the University of Michigan Museum of Anthropology. Starting in March 2018, Smith started as a research professor in the Center for Advanced Study of Human Paleobiology at The George Washington University in Washington, D.C. In June 2019, Smith became a visiting research professor at the University of Michigan Museum of Anthropological Archaeology. Since 1986, she has been invited to lecture at several institutions and conferences, including State University of New York at Stony Brook, University College London, University of Washington, Duke University, University of Tennessee, Complutense University Madrid, Max Planck Institute of Evolutionary Anthropology, and International Society of Dental Morphology in Griefswald, Germany.
