= Blackleach Burritt =

- Born: 1744; Ripton Parish, (now Huntington), Fairfield County, Connecticut
- Died: August 27, 1794; Winhall, Vermont, U.S.
- Education: Yale University (1765)
- Occupation: Clergyman
- Spouses: Martha Welles; Deborah Wells

Blackleach Burritt (1744 – August 27, 1794) was a preacher during the American Revolutionary War. During the war, he was incarcerated in a sugar house prison.

== Early life and ancestors ==
Blackleach Burritt was born at Ripton Parish, now Huntington, Connecticut, circa 1744, although no birth records have been found for his birth. He was the son and second child of Peleg Burritt Jr. The Burritts were descended from an old Connecticut family and his original immigrant ancestor was William Burritt and his wife Elizabeth who had emigrated to Connecticut around 1640 possibly from Glamorganshire, Wales. They were among the first settlers of Stratford, Connecticut. He was an expert blacksmith, an important trade for the new town.

His mother was Elizabeth Blackleach, the daughter of Richard Blackleach Jr. and Mehitabel (Leete) Laborie and a great-granddaughter of William Leete who was the Governor of the Colony of New Haven from 1661 to 1665 and Governor of Connecticut from 1676 to 1683. His mother died circa 1745 and his father remarried at Ripton Parish on November 25, 1746, Deborah Beardslee, the daughter of Caleb Beardslee and Elizabeth Booth, who was born on February 1, 1726, at Stratford, Connecticut and died at Hanover Green, Pennsylvania, on August 7, 1802. They were the parents of five children.

In 1751, he was made the heir of his grandfather Blackleach's large estate, since his mother had already died. He had aspired to further his education and his college tuition was paid for by the inheritance from his grandfather Blackleach's estate.

His great-uncle was the Rev. Dr. Israel Chauncy, the youngest son of President Charles Chauncy. He graduated in 1661 from Harvard College and was called as the pastor at the Congregational Church at Stratford, Connecticut, in 1663. On November 11, 1701, he was chosen Rector, or President of the new founded Yale College in New Haven, Connecticut. Professor James Luce Kingsley, in his History of Yale College, remarks of him, that "he had a high reputation for scholarship." He, however, declined the appointment. Dr. Charles Chauncy of Boston says of him, "He spent his days among that people (the people of Stratford) in great reputation as a physician, as well as a divine. It was said of him that he was one of the most hospitable and benevolent old gentlemen."

== Family ==
Soon after graduating from Yale College in 1765, he married, as his first wife, Martha Welles (1744 - April 1786) with whom he had twelve children. She was a daughter of Gideon Welles and Eunice Walker and a great-great-granddaughter of Governor Thomas Welles who along with his wife Alice and six children settled in the late summer 1636 probably in Cambridge, Massachusetts. He was the only man in Connecticut's history to hold all four top offices: governor, deputy governor, treasurer, and secretary. Following the death of his first wife, he married Deborah Wells of Long Island in 1788. There were two children born from this second marriage.

One of his sons, Dr. Eli Burritt, graduated from Williams College, class of 1800 and was licensed to practice medicine at Troy, New York, on March 29, 1802, and quickly gained recognition for his medical skills.

== Education and career ==
He graduated from Yale College in 1765. After graduating, he studied theology with his pastor, the Rev. Jedidiah Mills, Yale College, 1722, and was licensed to preach in the Congregational Church on February 24, 1768, by the Fairfield East Association of Ministers. Shortly after this he was preaching in Ridgebury Parish, in Ridgefield, Connecticut. Sometime prior to 1774, he and his family had relocated to Dutchess County, New York. He was ordained and licensed to preach that year in the Presbyterian Church and was installed as the pastor of the Pound Ridge Presbyterian Church where he was a very active partisan on the side of the Patriots while serving at this parish.

Burritt was influenced by and championed the causes of the evangelical style of the Great Awakening. He was also greatly influenced by the works of Jonathan Edwards and George Whitefield. He heard Whitefield preach, on several occasions, at the Yale College Chapel. He was also known for his use of extemporaneous preaching.

== Imprisonment ==
At the beginning of 1779, he was installed as the pastor of the Congregational Church in Greenwich, Connecticut, and while thus employed, having been prominent in his advocacy of the American cause, he was captured, on the early morning of June 18, 1779, and taken to the Sugar House Prison in New York City, where he was detained for about fourteen months, during which time his family took refuge in Pound Ridge, New York. The British press referred to Blackleach Burritt as that "most pestiferous rebel priest and preacher of sedition".

It is worthy of record here in this connection, that while Rev. Burritt was so incarcerated, being sick almost unto death, he was kindly ministered unto by William Irving, father of Washington Irving, and to whom he afterwards gave a quaint certificate vouching for his loyalty and setting forth the facts of the case, he (Irving) evidently being under the impression that his residence in the city during the war might expose him to proscription on the part of the now victorious Patriots. The document is published in Vol. I., of Washington Irving's Biography, and reference is made to the fact in the Burritt Family Record.

== Release ==
The exact date of his release from the Sugar House Prison is not known. However, by October 1780, he was living near Crompond, New York, where he was serving as pastor of the Presbyterian Church at that location. He served as the pastor of several Presbyterian churches in Westchester County, New York from 1780 to around 1788. In 1788 or 9 he was preaching in the North Parish of New Fairfield, Connecticut, now the town of Sherman, Connecticut; and in 1790 he was similarly engaged in Greenfield, then part of Saratoga, New York. Sometime in 1790, he had relocated to Duanesburg, New York, where many members of his family had settled and he founded the Presbyterian Church in Duanesburg around this same time.

== Death ==
In 1792 he began to preach to the Congregational Society in the village of Winhall, Vermont, where he was installed pastor on January 1, 1793. Burritt is reported to have had wonderful physical strength and agility. As a preacher he was noted for fluency and a love of argument. He was regarded as somewhat visionary and unpractical, and perhaps eccentric.

He died in Winhall of a prevailing fever on August 27, 1794, aged about 50 years.

== Sources ==
- Bailey, Sarah Loring.Historical sketches of Andover: (comprising the present towns of North Andover and Andover)Pages 97–1857 of Historical Sketches of Andover: Comprising the Present Towns of North Andover and Andover New York: Publisher Houghton, 1880.
- Bolton, Robert. A history of the county of Westchester, from its first settlement to the present time, Volume 2 Publisher Printed by Alexander S. Gould, 1848.
- Brace, Gerald Warner. Days that Were. New York: W.W. Norton & Company. 1976. ISBN 0-393-07509-5.
- Burritt, Dr, Alice.The family of Blackleach Burritt, Jr: pioneer, and one of the first settlers of Uniondale, Susquehanna County, Pennsylvania Publisher: Press of Gibson Bros., 1911.
- Clark, Edward Stephens.The Stephens family, with collateral branches Publisher: J. Winterburn Company, 1892.
- Cleave, Egbert. Sketch of Dr. John Franklin Gray, Cleave's Biographical Cyclopædia of Homœopathic Physicians and Surgeons. published by Galaxy Publishing Company, 1873.
- Day, Sherman.Historical collections of the State of Pennsylvania: containing a copious selection of the most interesting facts, traditions, biographical sketches, anecdotes, etc., relating to its history and antiquities, both general and local, with topographical descriptions of every county Publisher: G. W. Gorton, 1843.
- Dexter, Franklin Bowditch.Biographical sketches of the graduates of Yale college with annals of the college history ... Volume 3 of Biographical Sketches of the Graduates of Yale College with Annals of the College History Publisher: Holt & Company, 1903.
- Durfee, Calvin.Williams biographical annals Publisher Lee and Shepard, 1871.
- Foster, Emma J.The New York genealogical and biographical record, Volume 34" History of Carmel, New York Publisher: New York Genealogical and Biographical Society, 1903.
- Fowler, Charles Chauncy.Memorials of the Chaunceys: including President Chauncy, his ancestors and descendants Publisher: H.W. Dutton and son, printers, 1858.
- Fuess, Claude Moore. An old New England school: a history of Phillips Academy Andover New York: Publisher Houghton Mifflin company, 1917.
- Gillett, Rev. Ezra Hall History of the Presbyterian Church in the United States of America, Volume 1 Publisher Presbyterian Board of Publication, 1864.
- Hillstrom, Kevin.The industrial revolution in America, Volume 2 Publisher: ABC-CLIO, 2005 ISBN 1-85109-620-5.
- Irving, Pierre Munroe. The Life and Letters of Washington Irving New York: Publisher, BiblioBazaar, LLC, 2008. ISBN 0-559-38255-3.
- Kingsley, James Luce.A sketch of the history of Yale College in Connecticut Publisher: printed by Perkins, Marvin, & Co., 1835.
- Lindgren, Charlotte Holt. Gerald Warner Brace: Writer, Sailor, Teacher. New Hampshire: Hollis Publishing Company. 1998. ISBN 1-884186-08-4.
- Mather, Frederic Gregory. The refugees of 1776 from Long Island to Connecticut, Volume 94 of Willey whaling collection New York: J. B. Lyon Company, printers, 1913
- Mead, Spencer. Abstract of Probate Records at Fairfield, County of Fairfield, and State of Connecticut, 1704-1757 The Knickerbocker Press, 1911.
- O'Dea, Suzanne. From suffrage to the Senate an encyclopedia of American women in politics Santa Barbara: ABC-Clio
- Raymond, Marcius Denison. Gray genealogy : being a genealogical record and history of the descendants of John Gray, of Beverly, Mass., and also including sketches of other Gray families. New York: Higginson Book Company, 1887.
- MD Raymond. Souvenir of the Sherburne Centennial Celebration and Dedication of Monument to the Proprietors and Early Settlers, held on Wednesday, June 21, 1893. New York: M.D. Raymond, 1892.
- Raymond, Marcius D. Sketch of Rev. Blackleach Burritt and related Stratford families : a paper read before the Fairfield County Historical Society, at Bridgeport, Conn., Friday evening, Feb. 19, 1892. Bridgeport : Fairfield County Historical Society 1892.
- Raymond, Samuel. Genealogies of the Raymond families of New England, 1630-1 to 1886. With a historical sketch of some of the Raymonds of early times, their origin, etc. New York: Press of J.J. Little & Co., 1886.
- Siemiatkoski, Donna Holt.The Descendants of Governor Thomas Welles of Connecticut, 1590–1658, and His Wife, Alice Tomes Baltimore: Publisher Gateway Press, 1990.
- Talcott, Edward Lorenzo.The family of William Leete: one of the first settlers of Guilford, Conn., and governor of New Haven and Connecticut colonies Publisher: Tuttle, Morehouse & Taylor, printers, 1884.
