= New York Medical Times =

Monthly American medical journal

- Discipline: General medical
- Language: English
- Edited by: Dr. Egbert Guernsey.

Publication details
- History: 1881–1886
- Publisher: E.P. Coby & Co. (United States)
- Frequency: Monthly

Standard abbreviations
- ISO 4: N. Y. Med. Times

Indexing
- ISSN: 1077-792X

The New York Medical Times was a monthly medical journal published by E.P. Coby & Co. published between 1881 and 1896 and edited by Dr. Egbert Guernsey.

Another journal of the same name was published between 1851 and 1856.

== History ==
The Medical Union was published in two volumes in New York City from January, 1873, with Egbert Guernsey as the editor. In the same period, the New York Journal of Homœopathy was established by the New York Homeopathic Medical College, edited by William Tod Helmuth and T. F. Allen as editors of volume one, and Dr. Samuel A. Jones as the general editor of volume two. Both journals were consolidated into Homœopathic Times in 1875, which published a volume three under the editorship of Drs. Egbert Guernsey, Alfred K. Hills and J. B. Gilbert and continued until April 1881, when it became the New York Medical Times, with homœopathy being no longer being included. In 1897, the name was changed to Medical Times (ISSN 0092-7309), and it was published at least through 1922. In January 1931, it merged with the Long Island Medical Journal, and renamed to Medical Times and Long Island Medical Journal (ISSN 0092-6981). It reverted back to the title Medical Times (ISSN 0025-7583) after June 1936.
