= Children's Aid =

New York City child welfare organization

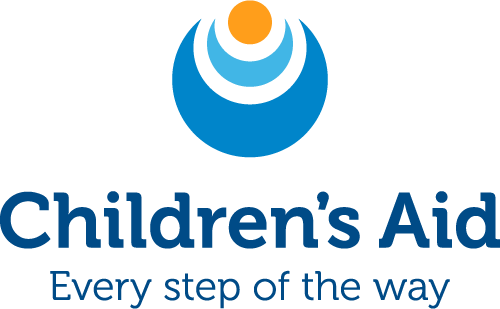
- Formation: 1853; 173 years ago New York, New York, U.S.
- Founder: Charles Loring Brace (Yale College, 1846)
- Type: Private, 501(c)(3)
- Region served: New York City
- President: Phoebe C. Boyer
- Revenue: ▲$140.2 million (2014) $137.3 million (2013)
- Expenses: ▲$124 million (2014) $121.7 million (2013)
- Staff: 1,200+ full-time
- Website: childrensaidnyc.org
- Remarks: Firsts: Orphan Train; parent-teacher associations; free school lunch programs; free dental clinics for children; day schools for handicapped children; kindergarten in the United States; industrial schools; foster homes; “fresh air” vacations

Children's Aid, formerly the Children's Aid Society, is a private child welfare nonprofit in New York City founded in 1853 by Charles Loring Brace. With an annual budget of over $100 million, 45 citywide sites, and over 1,200 full-time employees, Children's Aid is one of America's oldest and largest children's nonprofits.

Children's Aid helps tens of thousands of disadvantaged New York City children succeed annually, by providing comprehensive services of adoption and foster care, after-school and weekend programs, arts, camps, early childhood education, events, family support, medical, mental health, and dental, juvenile justice, legal advocacy, special initiatives, sports and recreation, and youth development programs.

== History ==
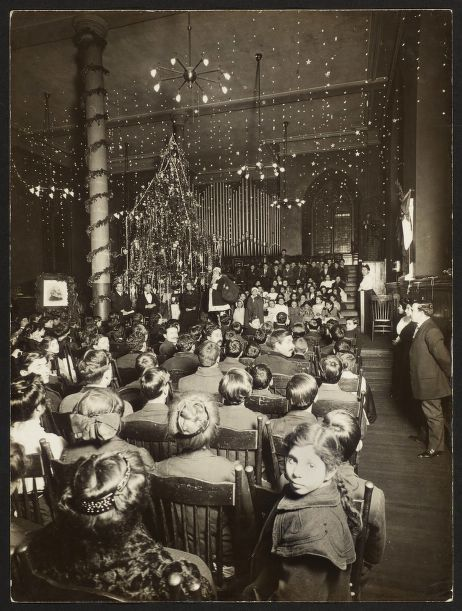
From Harvard's Underwood & Underwood 1909 Collection

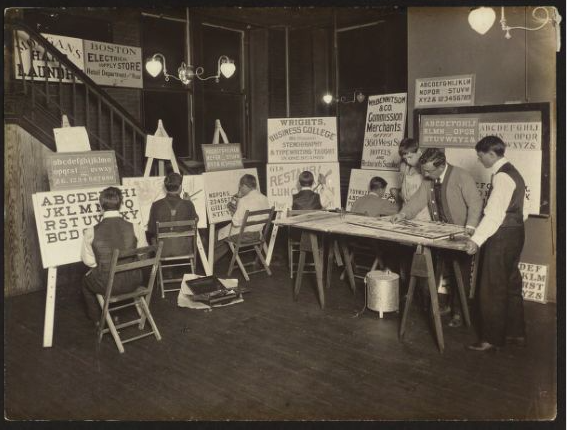
From Harvard's Underwood & Underwood 1909 Collection

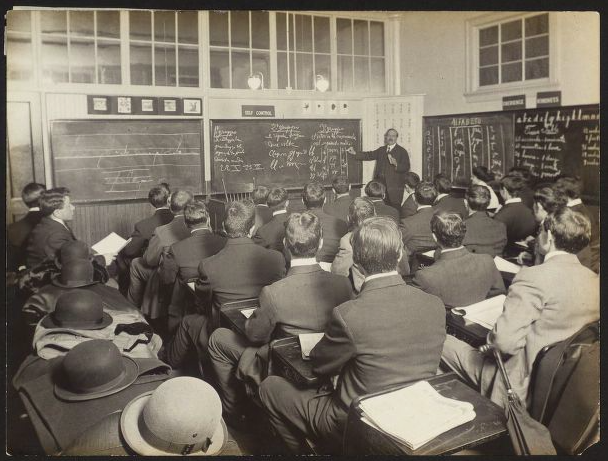
From Harvard's Underwood & Underwood 1909 Collection

From Harvard's Underwood & Underwood 1909 Collection

In 1853, Children's Aid was founded by Yale College graduate and philanthropist, Charles Loring Brace, with financial support from New York businessmen and philanthropists, to ensure the physical and emotional well-being of children, and provide them with the support needed to become successful adults. Brace was appalled by the thousands of abandoned, abused, and orphaned children living in the slums and on the streets of New York at the time. The only options available to such children at the time were begging, prostitution, petty thievery, and gang membership, or commitment to jails, almshouses, and orphanages.

Brace believed that institutional care stunted and destroyed children. His view was only work, education, and a strong family life could help them develop into self-reliant citizens. Brace knew that American pioneers could use help settling the American West, and arranged to send the orphaned children to them. This became known as the Orphan Train Movement. The children were encouraged to break completely with the past and would arrive in a town where community leaders assembled interested townspeople for inspection and selection. As the movement grew, CAS operated with support from a mix of public and private funding. By the late 19th century, around half of CAS's operations was funded by the government which justified its support by citing savings it gained compared to maintaining traditional orphanages. CAS's mixed financing model, while not uncommon among major child welfare institutions in New York at that time, gradually normalized extensive public financial support in the realm of private child welfare services.

The program was controversial, as some abolitionists viewed it as a form of slavery, while pro-slavery advocates saw it part of the abolitionist movement, since the labor provided by the children made slaves unnecessary. Some Catholics deemed the program to be anti-Catholic, since a significant percentage of poor children in Manhattan were Irish Catholic, and would be raised outside of their faith once transported into the interior of the country. Growing concerns over the movement being a front for Protestant proselytizing among poor, immigrant, predominately Catholic children resulted in the Society narrowing its placements to exclusively Protestant white children by the 1890s. In response, the Archdiocese of New York also upgraded their own child-welfare programs, improving the parochial school system, building more Catholic orphanages, and creating a 114-acre (46-hectare) training center on farmland in the Bronx, which they called the Catholic Protectory.

From 1854 to the last train in 1929, more than 250,000 children rode the "Orphan Train" to new lives. The Orphan Train Heritage Society maintains an archive of riders' stories. The National Orphan Train Museum in Concordia, Kansas maintains records and also houses a research facility.

=== Development ===
==== Other child welfare innovations ====
Since originating the Orphan Train in 1853, Children's Aid has founded a series of child welfare innovations that have since become commonplace, such as:

- some of the first industrial schools
- the first parent-teacher associations
- the first free school lunch programs
- the first free dental clinics for children
- the first day schools for handicapped children
- the first kindergarten in the United States
- the first foster homes
- the first “fresh air” vacations, in which urban children visit host families in the country for the summer.
- toy drives for children during the holidays

In the 1980s Children's Aid created the first family court diversion programs, where social workers meet with out-of-control children and their families in an attempt to find out of court solutions.

In 1992, Children's Aid created the first "community school", a partnership with the New York City Department of Education where a full array of health, mental and after-school, weekend and summer programs are available to students at school. The Technical Assistance Center has helped visitors from all over the United States and more than 40 foreign countries learn how to apply "community school" concepts in their schools.

In 2009, it was honored with a Village Award from the Greenwich Village Society for Historic Preservation for its Philip Coltoff Center in Greenwich Village (since razed for new residential development). In 2012, Children's Aid was rated 4/4 stars by charities rating organization Charity Navigator for a record-breaking 12th consecutive year.

==== Leadership ====
In 1912, Charles Loring Brace Jr. was re-elected board secretary of the society founded by his father. Board Chair Emeriti include Edward Lamont Sr. and Edgar Koerner, with over thirty notable board members.

In 2014, the Children's Aid board of trustees appointed Phoebe C. Boyer as its eleventh President and CEO and first female leader.

== In popular culture ==
- Christina Baker Kline's "Orphan Train, a novel", a 2013 historical fiction which features main character Vivian Daly (Niamh) as a 9 year old Irish immigrant abandoned in New York after a family tragedy who is placed on board the train heading to Minnesota in 1929 by Children's Aid. Her journey through several foster homes to adulthood is shared with Molly, a present-day 17-year-old in foster care with her own issues with whom she forges a friendship.ISBN 978-0-06-195072-8
- Kate Manning's My Notorious Life (2014) predominantly features as main characters 1800s orphans who get selected from the street among children who must prostitute themselves for food by Charles Loring Brace for the Orphan Train, and eventually become Lake Shore Drive (Chicago) and Fifth Avenue residents.
- The book "Last Train Home, an orphan train story" by Renée Wendinger is a historical novella describing the methods by which children were placed by the Children's Aid and the New York Foundling following the lives of two children of the train.ISBN 978-0-9913603-1-4
- The book "Extra! Extra! The Orphan Trains and Newsboys of New York" by Renée Wendinger is an unabridged nonfiction resource book and pictorial history about the orphan trains. ISBN 978-0-615-29755-2
- The song by Utah Phillips called "Orphan Train" has been performed by numerous modern bluegrass singers.
- The book Gratefully Yours describes a nine-year-old girl's feelings about her new family who adopt her from the orphan train.
- There is a ballet entitled Orphan Train presented by Covenant Ballet Theatre of Brooklyn, which tells the story of Brace and shows stories of orphans on the train.
- Authors Al and Joanna Lacy have written an Orphan Trains Trilogy, depicting the lives of fictional orphans.
- The ballad "Rider On An Orphan Train", written by David Massengill, describes the inevitable tragedy of the separation of siblings in spite of the efforts to keep brothers and sisters together.
- The book Train to Somewhere by Eve Bunting describes a fictional account of a girl's journey on the Orphan Train.

== See also ==
- Timeline of children's rights in the United States
