= Sherburne (village), New York =

Sherburne, New York
- Village
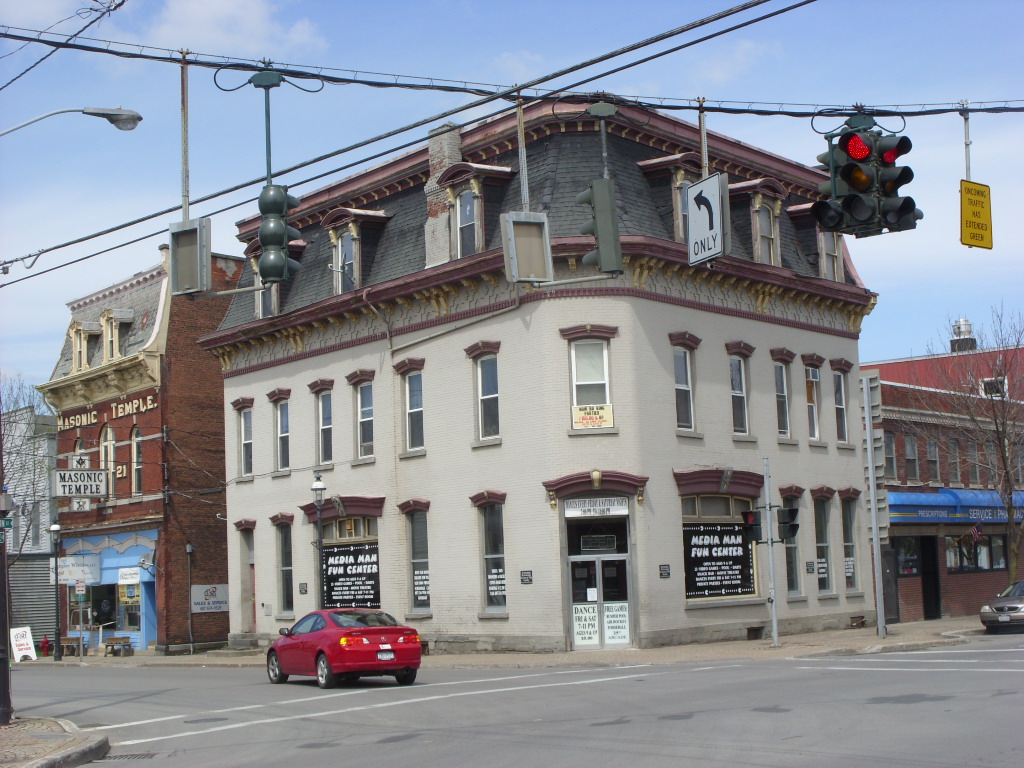
- Downtown Sherburne

- Location within the state of New York Sherburne (the United States)
- Coordinates: 42°40′45″N 75°29′51″W
- Country: United States
- State: New York
- County: Chenango
- Town: Sherburne

Area
  - Total: 1.52 sq mi (3.94 km^{2})
  - Land: 1.52 sq mi (3.94 km^{2})
  - Water: 0 sq mi (0.00 km^{2})
- Elevation: 1,047 ft (319 m)

Population (2020)
  - Total: 1,360
  - Density: 895.1/sq mi (345.61/km^{2})
- Time zone: UTC-5 (Eastern (EST))
  - Summer (DST): UTC-4 (EDT)
- ZIP code: 13460
- Area code: 607
- FIPS code: 36-66883
- GNIS feature ID: 0965062
- Website: villageofsherburneny.gov

Sherburne is a village in Chenango County, New York, United States. The population was 1,367 at the 2010 census. It is in the town of Sherburne, north of Norwich.

== History ==
The first settlement of the town of Sherburne took place near the present-day village circa 1792. The village of Sherburne was incorporated in 1830.

== Geography ==
Sherburne is located slightly southwest of the geographic center of the town of Sherburne, at 42°40′45″N 75°29′51″W (42.679302, -75.497518).

According to the United States Census Bureau, the village has a total area of 1.5 square miles (3.9 km^{2}), all land.

The Chenango River, a southward-flowing tributary of the Susquehanna River, forms the western boundary of the village.

The intersection of Route 12 (North and South Main Street) and NY-80 is in the village. NY 12 leads south 11 miles (18 km) to Norwich, the county seat, and north 36 miles (58 km) to Utica. NY 80 leads east 12 miles (19 km) to New Berlin and west 13 miles (21 km) to Otselic.

== Demographics ==
Historical population
Census	Pop.	Note	%±
1880	944		—
1890	960		1.7%
1900	899		−6.4%
1910	960		6.8%
1920	1,104		15.0%
1930	1,077		−2.4%
1940	1,192		10.7%
1950	1,604		34.6%
1960	1,647		2.7%
1970	1,613		−2.1%
1980	1,561		−3.2%
1990	1,531		−1.9%
2000	1,455		−5.0%
2010	1,367		−6.0%
2020	1,360		−0.5%
U.S. Decennial Census

As of the census of 2000, there were 1,455 people, 648 households, and 351 families residing in the village. The population density was 956.9 inhabitants per square mile (369.5/km^{2}). There were 700 housing units at an average density of 460.4 per square mile (177.8/km^{2}). The racial makeup of the village was 98.76% White, 0.48% Black or African American, 0.07% Native American, 0.07% Asian, 0.14% from other races, and 0.48% from two or more races. Hispanic or Latino of any race were 1.03% of the population.

There were 648 households, out of which 28.5% had children under the age of 18 living with them, 39.4% were married couples living together, 11.1% had a female householder with no husband present, and 45.7% were non-families. 40.4% of all households were made up of individuals, and 17.7% had someone living alone who was 65 years of age or older. The average household size was 2.21 and the average family size was 2.99.

In the village, the population was spread out, with 25.6% under the age of 18, 7.1% from 18 to 24, 27.4% from 25 to 44, 21.6% from 45 to 64, and 18.4% who were 65 years of age or older. The median age was 38 years. For every 100 females, there were 85.8 males. For every 100 females age 18 and over, there were 80.8 males.

The median income for a household in the village was $28,676, and the median income for a family was $39,844. Males had a median income of $31,080 versus $20,833 for females. The per capita income for the village was $18,248. About 13.3% of families and 18.6% of the population were below the poverty line, including 24.3% of those under age 18 and 6.0% of those age 65 or over.
