= Marcius D. Raymond =

American writer (1833–1911)

Marcius Dension Raymond (April 8, 1833 – December 15, 1911) was an American newspaper publisher and editor, writer, genealogist, and historian.

== Biography ==
Marcius Dension Raymond was born on April 8, 1833, in Sherburne, New York. He was the son of Alfred Raymond, Sr. and Sarah Gardiner.

He began his career in Clinton, New York, working as a reporter on the Clinton Courier. He later became the editor and publisher of the newspaper. In 1859, he sold the newspaper and he left Clinton and relocated to Tarrytown, where he was the owner and publisher of the Tarrytown Argus. He sold the paper in 1909 to Wallace Odell and George F. Van Tassel of the Tarrytown Daily News. He also served as postmaster of Tarrytown from 1881 to 1885.

Raymond was a local historian, member of the Sons of the American Revolution, and local speaker on historical topics. He was a driving force behind the campaign to raise funds to build a granite monument to the soldiers of the American Revolutionary War buried in Sleepy Hollow Cemetery. Raymond was a member of the monument committee spoke at the monument's dedication.

Raymond was active in local Republican party politics, serving as Chairman of the Westchester Republican County Committee.

Raymond married Elnora H. Purdy (1835–1898) on September 19, 1855, at the First Congregational Church in Sherburne, New York. They had one child, Lizzie May Raymond, who married Joseph Edward See. Raymond married Bertha Carpenter (1837–1911) in 1900 in Tarrytown, New York.

He died on December 15, 1911, in Tarrytown.

== Works ==
- Gray genealogy : being a genealogical record and history of the descendants of John Gray, of Beverly, Mass., and also including sketches of other Gray families. New York: Higginson Book Company, 1887.

=== Papers and programs ===
- Sketch of Rev. Blackleach Burritt and related Stratford families : a paper read before the Fairfield County Historical Society, at Bridgeport, Conn., Friday evening, Feb. 19, 1892 (1892)
- Souvenir of the revolutionary soldiers' monument dedication, at Tarrytown, N.Y. : October 19, 1894
- David Williams and the capture of Andre: A paper read before the Tarrytown Historical Society Tarrytown: Argus – 1903 – approx. 35 pp. see David Williams (soldier)
- Colonel William Stephens Smith, New York Genealogical and Historical Record 25, 4 (1894): 153–61. see Colonel William Stephens Smith.
- Washington at Tarrytown. A Paper read before the Tarrytown Historical Society, Tuesday Eve, December 16, 1890. Published by the Author by Request. Tarrytown, N.Y. 1893. 8vo. pp. 18.
- Col. Christopher Greene of Rhode Island read before the Rhode Island Historical Society, April 26, 1902. Published by the Author by Request. Tarrytown, N.Y. (1902). see Colonel Christopher Greene
- Souvenir of the Sherburne Centennial Celebration and Dedication of Monument to the Proprietors and Early Settlers, held on Wednesday, June 21, 1893. New York: M.D. Raymond, 1892.
