= Egbert Cleave =

American author

Egbert Cleave (flourished 1870s) was an American author from Ohio.

== Publications ==
- Cleave's biographical cyclopaedia of homoeopathic physicians and surgeons (1873)
- City of Cleveland and Cuyahoga County (1875)
- Biographical cyclopædia of Ohio: Hamilton County, city of Cincinnati (1877)
- A biographical cyclopædia and portrait gallery of distinguished men (1879)
