= Catholic Guardian Services =

Charity in New York City

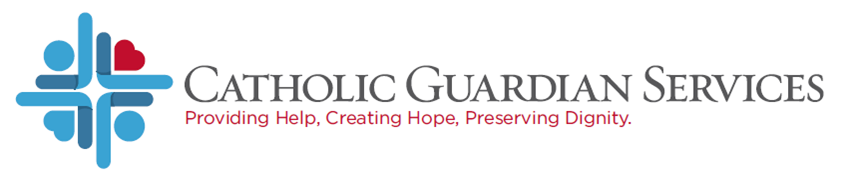
- Founded: 1887
- Type: 501(c)(3) Corporation
- Location: New York City, New York, U.S.
- Executive Director: Craig Longley
- Website: http://www.catholicguardian.org/

Catholic Guardian Services (CGS) is a non-profit organization serving peoples of the disadvantaged population in the New York metropolitan area. It is sponsored by Catholic Charities of the Archdiocese of New York.

CGS provides services in child abuse, neglect prevention, foster care, maternity services, and developmental disabilities. As of Dec 2025, it has over 1000 employees across six offices and 34 residential facilities. CGS’s is supported by approximately 600 foster and adoptive parents.

The programs and services operate in cooperation with the Archdiocese of New York, the New York City government, the New York State government, education agencies, foundations, policymakers, and advocacy groups.

== History ==
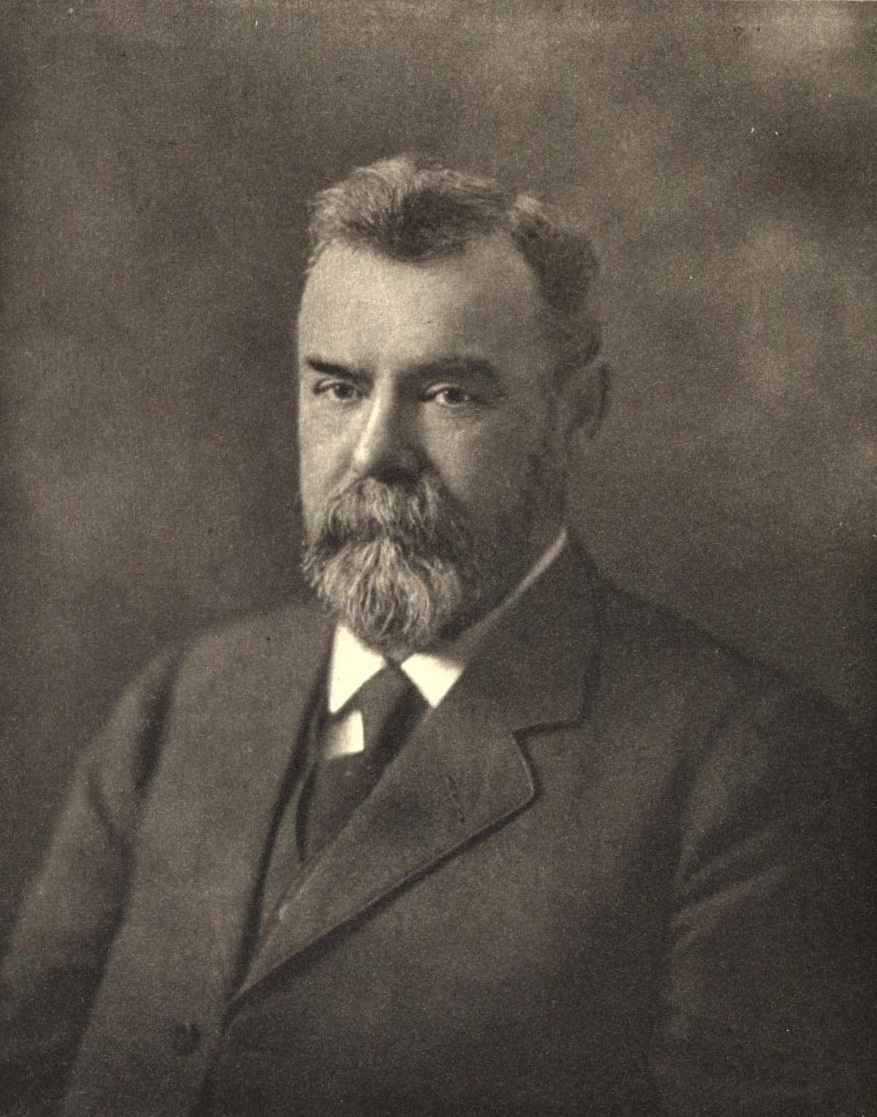
Thomas Maurice Mulry, member of St. Vincent de Paul Society and founder of CHB.

The history of Catholic Guardian Services starts with two predecessors: Catholic Home Bureau for Dependent Children, and Catholic Guardian Society of New York, each with the common goal of assisting disadvantaged people and communities of New York City.

=== Catholic Home Bureau for Dependent Children ===
The Catholic Home Bureau (CHB) was founded in 1898 by members of the St. Vincent de Paul Society. However, the agency was neither incorporated nor legally authorized as “a charitable organization for the placing of Catholic children” until January 7, 1899, when Justice H. W. Bookstoner of the New York State Supreme Court signed off on its certification. CHB was established as a Catholic foster home agency in the United States and was among the earliest Catholic institutions involved in child welfare services. The agency was founded to provide safe Catholic homes to institutionalized orphans, to relieve overcrowded conditions at such facilities without shipping the children out West to likely Protestant homes on orphan trains.

From 1899 to 1902, CHB helped 465 orphans find families across the Northeast in states such as New York, Pennsylvania, New Jersey, Connecticut, Vermont, and Indiana. The agency grew in the ensuing decades, and by January 31, 1925, CHB had placed 4,764 children in free and adoptive homes. CHB funded such an operation with a combination of earnings, donations, and assistance from the St. Vincent de Paul Society. The Department of Charities of New York City paid from $25 in 1898 to $50 in 1925 annually per child placed by the agency.

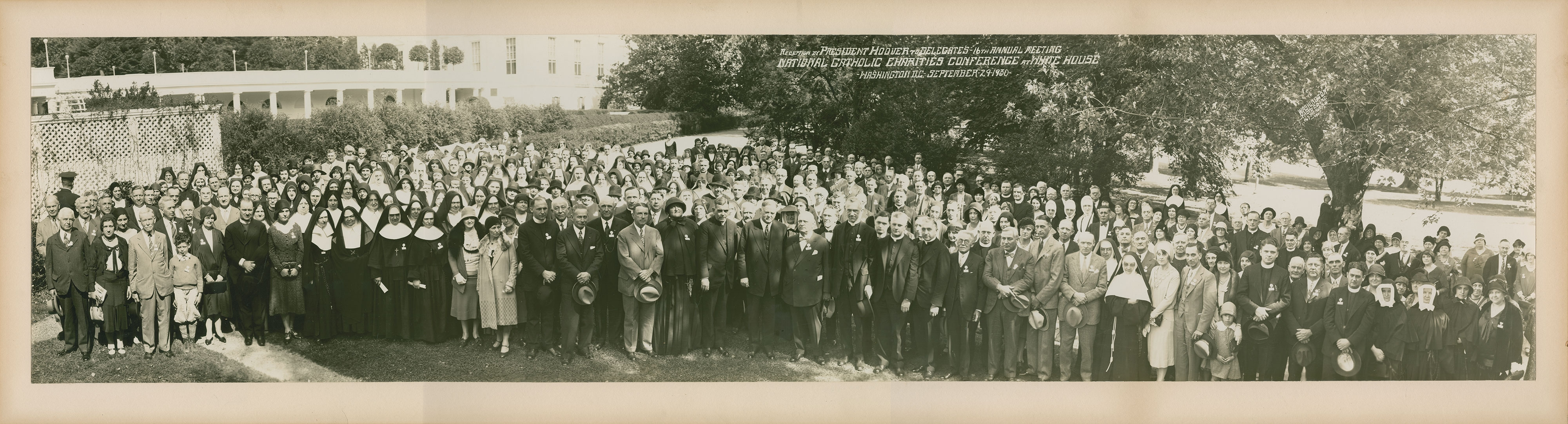
CHB at the White House for the White House Conference on the Care of Dependent Children.

In 1909, the Board of Directors of CHB, led by Thomas Mulry with key participation from Edmund Butler, attended the first White House Conference on the Care of Dependent Children per invitation from President Theodore Roosevelt. This conference aimed to garner government support for the protection of children from institutionalization and neglect. The agency witnessed a great overhaul in 1925 as the St. Vincent de Paul Society withdrew its sponsorship, and Catholic Charities of the Archdiocese of New York and Diocese of Brooklyn assumed this responsibility. This marked an extension of the services offered by CHB, and under the auspices of Catholic Charities, CHB established its own Maternity Services Program.

In the wake of this transferal of sponsorship, CHB expanded and adapted its services for decades. After World War II, the Cardinal McCloskey Home opened in response to a massive increase in the need for foster homes and served as a temporary location for children awaiting CHB placement. The Cardinal McCloskey Home itself eventually entered the field of placing children and is today known as Cardinal McCloskey Community Services.

In 1976, Sister Una McCormack of the Dominican Sisters of Sparkill joined CHB and spearheaded an Independent Living Program geared toward assisting teens care for themselves once discharged from foster care. In 1984, CHB kick-started a family day care program in the Bronx to offer low-cost, quality care to 275 children with working mothers. In the mid to late 1980s, the agency began to serve New York’s homeless population with the St. James, Mitty, and St. Elizabeth Seton residences located in lower Manhattan and the Bronx. In 1989, in response to the AIDS crisis, CHB opened Incarnation Children’s Center in Washington Heights as a transitional residence for HIV-infected babies and young children. In 2000, Incarnation Children’s Center became separately incorporated as a pediatric AIDS skilled nursing facility.

In 2006, Catholic Home Bureau underwent a major administrative change, merging with Catholic Guardian Society to become the larger, more comprehensive agency, Catholic Guardian Society and Home Bureau (CGSHB), overseen by Executive Director John Frein.

=== Catholic Guardian Society of New York ===
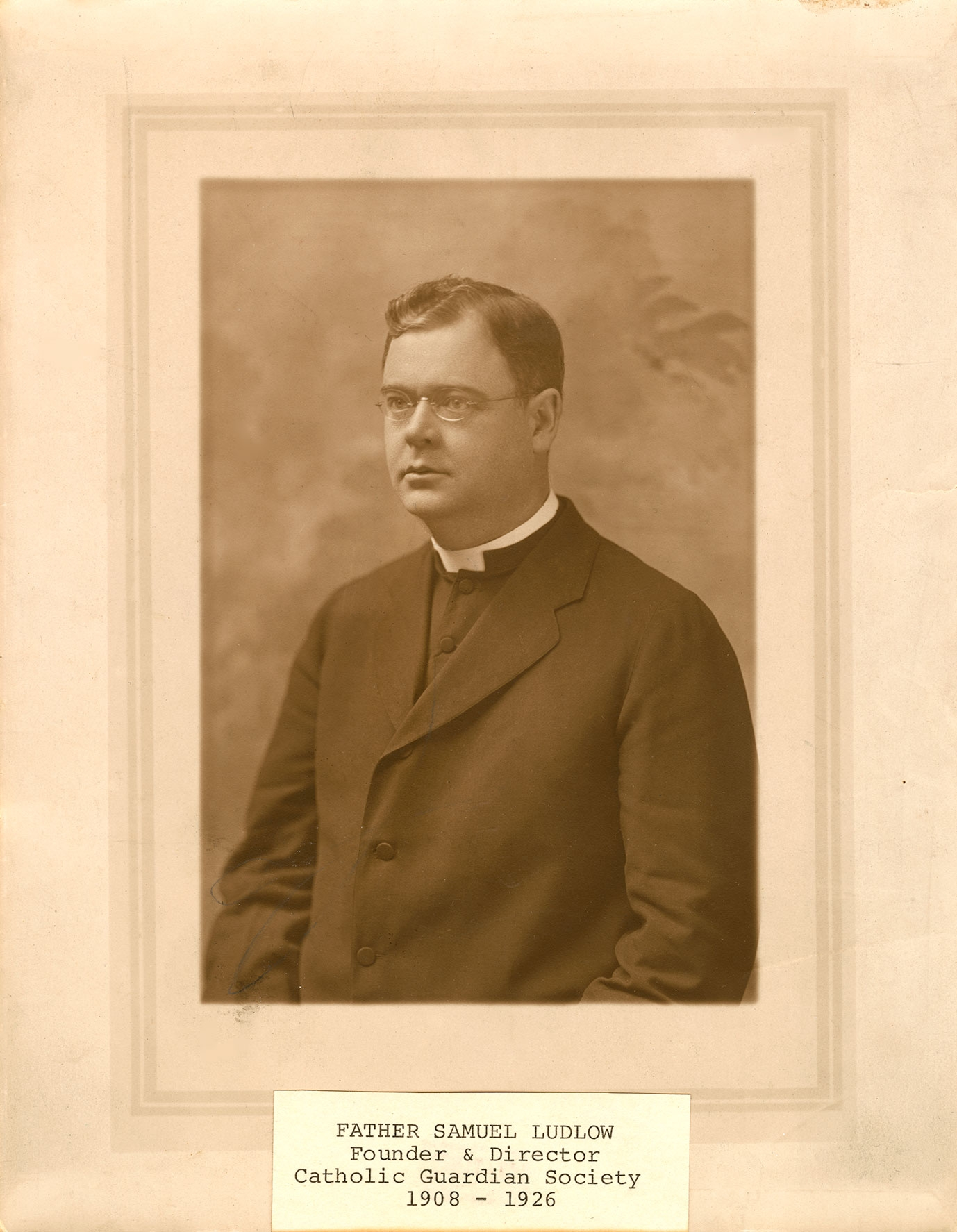
CGS Founder Father Samuel Ludlow.

The Catholic Guardian Society (CGS) of the Archdiocese of New York was founded in 1908 by Father Samuel Ludlow and later incorporated in 1913. The Fledgling Agency offered aftercare services, providing for hundreds of children, particularly those of immigrants, discharged from institutional care. These children were often orphans, born to working-class families, and often newly arriving immigrants to the United States.

The late 1960s and early 1970s witnessed major expansion throughout CGS. Between 1965 and 1974, Executive Directors Monsignor Edmund Fogarty and layman Mr. James P. O’Neill contributed to the evolution of the agency with the additions of the agency operated Boarding Home Program, Group Home Program, the Adoption Department, the Education and Guidance Department, and the Medical Department.

In 1978, after the Willowbrook exposé, CGS cooperated with the New York State Department of Mental Retardation and Developmental Disabilities to open a community residence for persons with profound handicaps. In similar fashion, the agency again adapted its foster care services so as to be able to care for children afflicted with HIV/AIDS in the late 1980s in its newly created Special Medical Family Foster Care Program.

In this millennium, CGS has also begun child abuse and neglect prevention programs and specialized residential treatment services for foster care youth with mental illness. At the administrative level, CGS has undergone significant change as well; in 2006, Catholic Guardian Society merged with Catholic Home Bureau to create Catholic Guardian Society and Home Bureau (CGSHB).

=== Catholic Guardian Society and Home Bureau ===
After the 2006 merger between CGS and CHB, the new agency further developed many of its services. In 2008, CGSHB received accreditation for international adoption services. Later, in 2009, the organization formed a Youth Employment Services (YES) program. Two years later, after CGSHB’s de facto merger with Rosalie Hall, maternity services throughout the agency were bolstered, resulting in the creation of its Rosalie Hall Maternity Services Parenting Resource Center.

=== Rosalie Hall ===
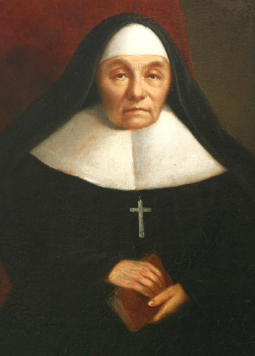
Venerable Marie-Rosalie Cadron-Jetté, foundress of the Misericordia Sisters.

In September 1887, Archbishop Michael Corrigan of the Archdiocese of New York summoned five Misericordia Sisters from Montreal, Canada to provide care for the growing number of unmarried pregnant women in New York. The Sisters arrived on Staten Island and established the New York Mothers’ Home. Soon they moved to Harlem and later purchased land on 86th Street in Yorkville, where Rosalie Hall made its new home. By the turn of the century, the Misericordia Sisters had given free service to almost 1,000 young mothers. In 1904, the Sisters altered their charter to accommodate for all those in need of medical attention, not simply young mothers. With this fundamental change in their services, they changed the name of their home to Misericordia Hospital in 1905.

By 1950, Misericordia Hospital was the second largest Catholic hospital in all of New York City. In 1958, Misericordia Hospital moved to the Bronx. In 2008, Misericordia Hospital, then Our Lady of Mercy Hospital, joined Montefiore Medical Center. Rosalie Hall eventually became a separately incorporated entity, and in 2011, Catholic Guardian Societies and Home Bureau and Rosalie Hall integrated services for pregnant and parenting adolescents in foster care and women in need. By 2013, 125 years after its founding, Rosalie Hall Inc. permanently merged into Catholic Guardian Services to become the Rosalie Hall Maternity Services Division within it.

The Evolution of Rosalie Hall

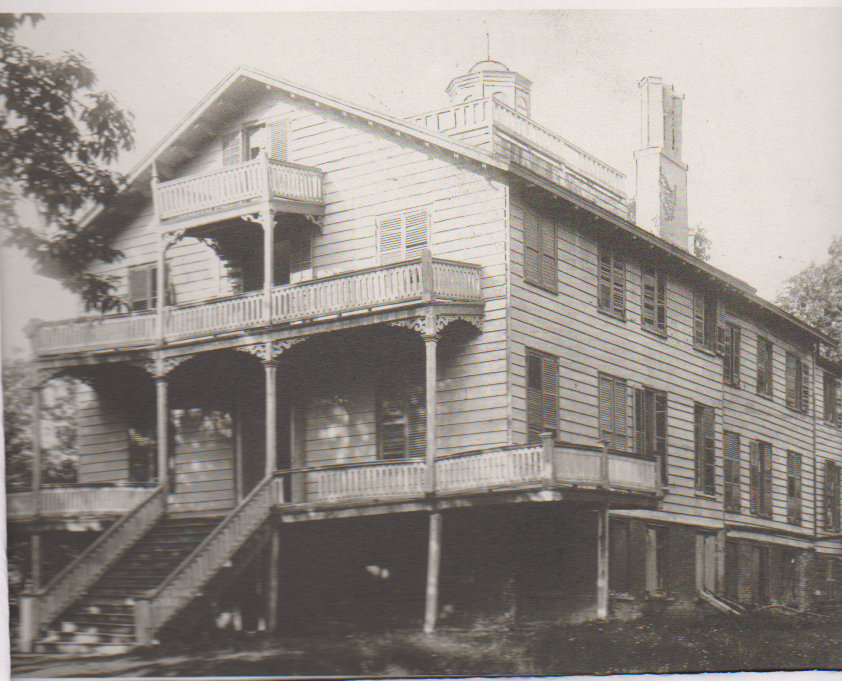
New York Mothers' Home Staten Island 1887.

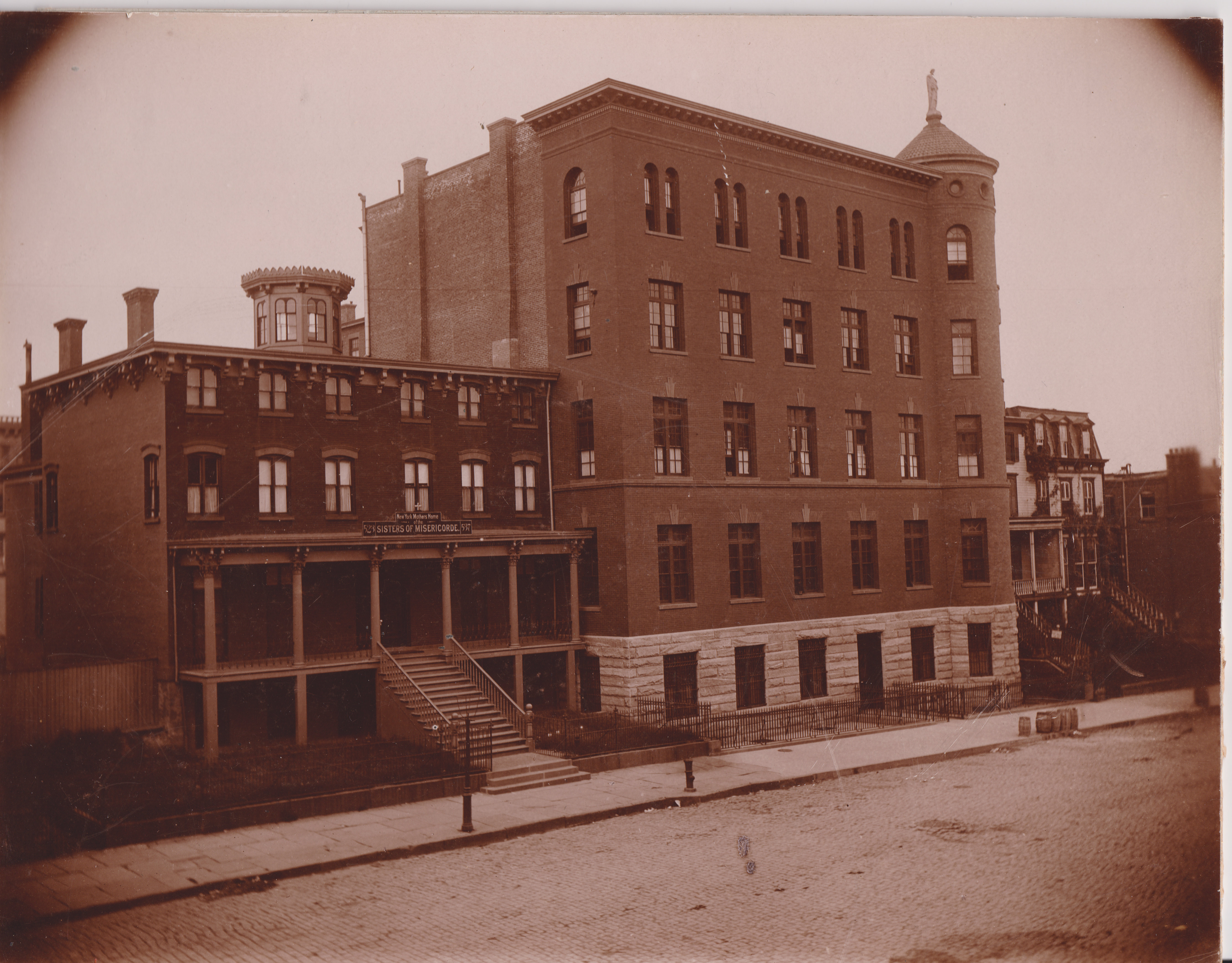
Misericordia Hospital 86th Street, Manhattan 1905.

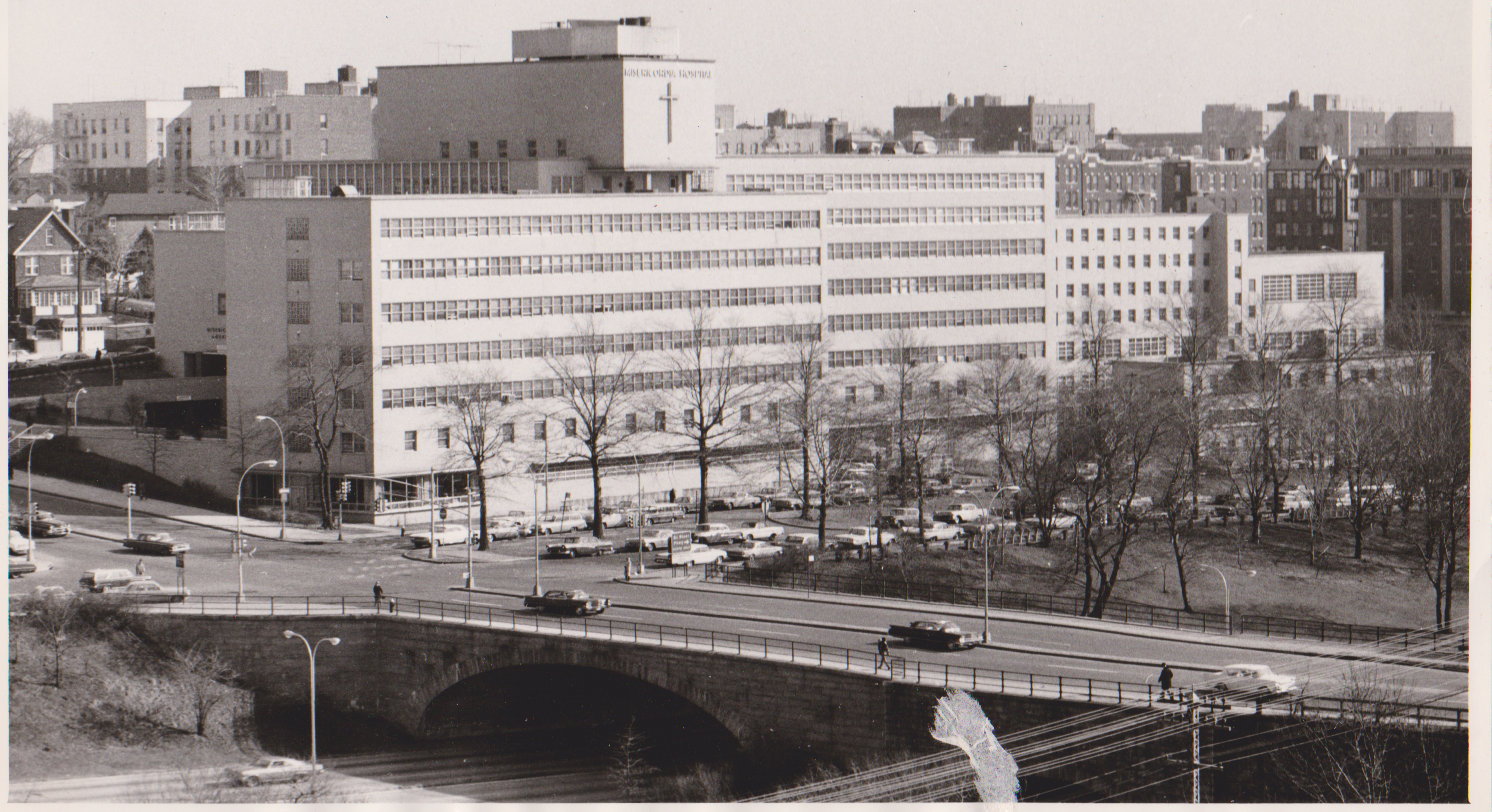
Misericordia Hospital Bronx 1958.

=== Catholic Guardian Services ===
In 2013, Catholic Guardian Society and Home Bureau changed its legal corporate name to Catholic Guardian Services, and its tagline to, “Providing Help, Creating Hope, Preserving Dignity.” Later, in 2014, the newly branded Catholic Guardian Services began a federally sponsored program for unaccompanied minors to accommodate to migrant children fleeing dire circumstances in Central America. Today, Catholic Guardian Services offers all of the care once offered separately by Catholic Guardian Society, Catholic Home Bureau, and Rosalie Hall Inc.

== Services ==
Catholic Guardian Services offers a variety of programs, divided into three general areas.

=== Child Welfare Services ===
Child welfare services provide care and support for children who cannot safely remain at home. These services include family foster care, which places children with foster families, relatives, or adoptive families. Foster care options are available for younger children, teenagers, and children with significant medical needs, including those requiring ongoing health care.

For children and teens who need more structured support, child welfare services also include residential programs. These provide housing and treatment for adolescents with complex needs, as well as residences for pregnant and parenting teens and their children. In addition, children in foster care receive support services such as help with education and employment, access to medical and mental health care, and crisis intervention when emergencies arise.

=== Family Support Services ===
Family support services help children and families during periods of stress or transition. These services include programs focused on preventing child abuse and neglect, as well as maternity and parenting support through Rosalie Hall Maternity Services. Rosalie Hall offers support before and after birth, home visits by nurses, parenting guidance, peer support, and counseling on parenting options, along with assistance with domestic and international adoption.

Other programs address the needs of children in foster care who have complex medical or mental health challenges, offering support both while they are in care and after they return to the community. Additional services support families with infants who need extra guidance in early childhood and provide shelter and family care for unaccompanied minors seeking refuge from violence and poverty in Central America.

=== Developmental Disability Services ===
Developmental disability services include residential programs that support people with different needs. These programs serve older adults, people with developmental disabilities who also have mental health conditions, people who are blind or deaf, and people who have limited mobility.The services also include respite care, which provides short-term relief for caregivers.

== Governance ==
Catholic Guardian Services is governed by a board of directors, composed of 25 individuals representing different expertises. Additionally, the agency functions with a group of 10 senior administrators at the forefront of all operations. These administrators provide both oversight of general activity and development of specific programs within the agency.
