= Concordia station (Kansas) =

Coordinates: 39.5746°N 97.6615°W

- Union Pacific Railroad Depot
- U.S. National Register of Historic Places
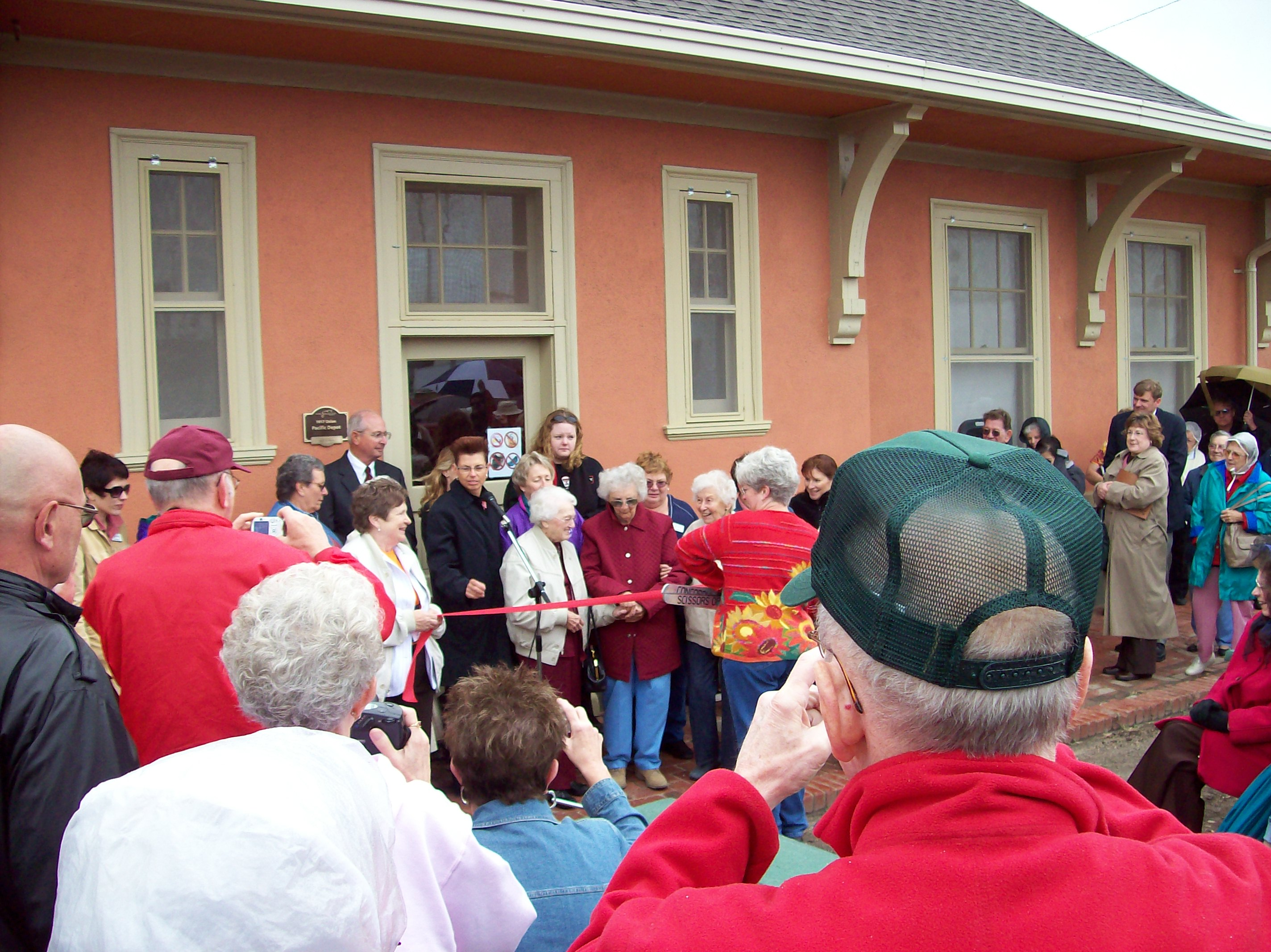
- Grand Opening of the National Orphan Train Museum housed at the Concordia UP Depot
- Location: 300 Washington St. Concordia, Kansas September 15, 2007
- MPS: Railroad Resources of Kansas MPS
- NRHP reference No.: 03001465
- Added to NRHP: January 21, 2004

The Union Pacific Railroad Depot in Concordia, Kansas, is a historic railroad depot that is listed on the National Register of Historic Places. The building is one of many built by the Union Pacific Railroad to assist with the company's growth across the United States.

== Restoration and current use ==
The building is no longer used as a railroad depot. It has been restored and now houses the National Orphan Train Complex. The complex hosts a museum and research center dedicated to the preservation of the stories and artifacts of those who were part of the Orphan Train Movement from 1854 to 1929. The museum is open for research and is visited by around 4,000 people each year, one third of who are descendants of orphan train riders.

== Image gallery ==
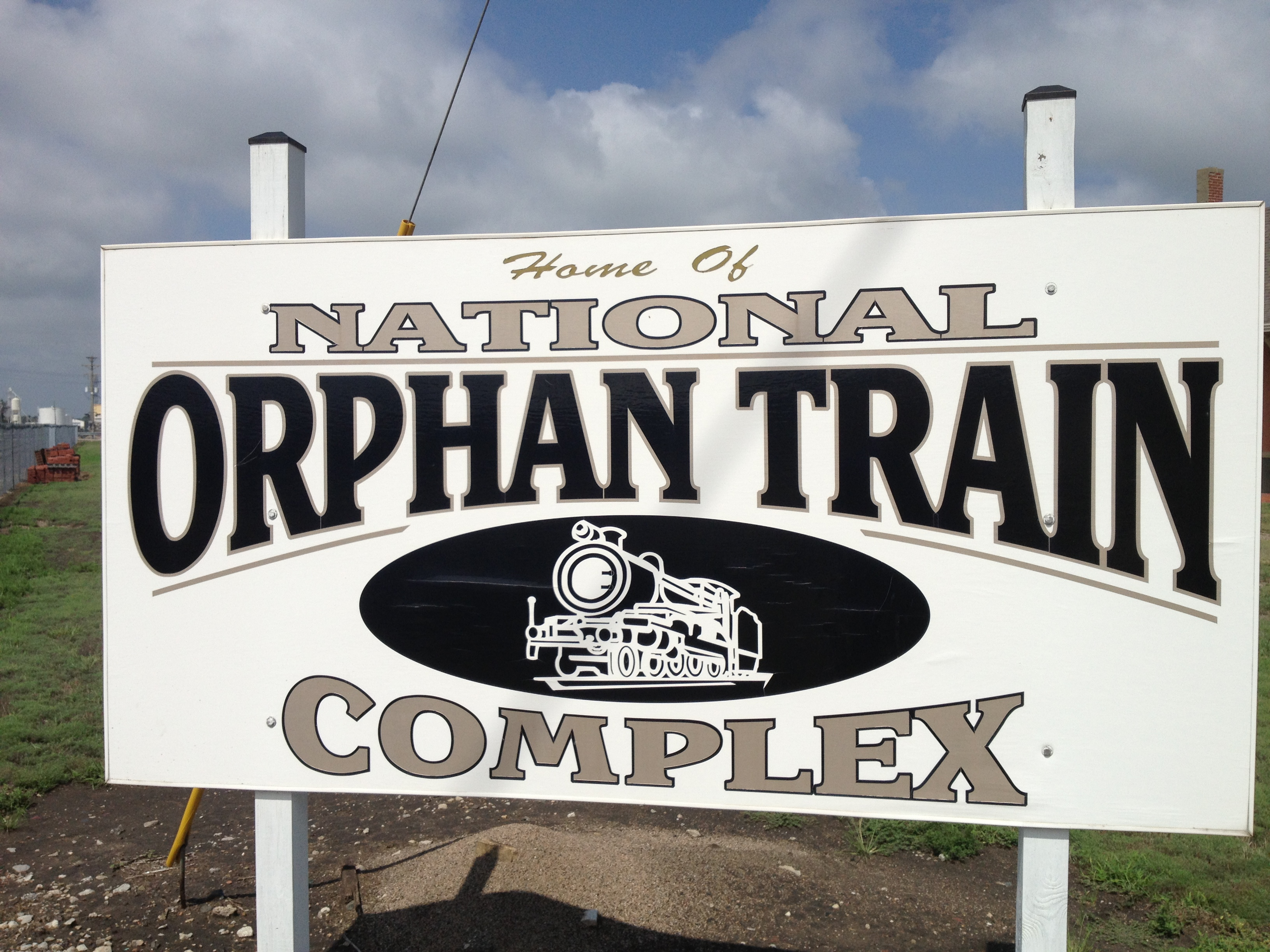
Sign for the museum

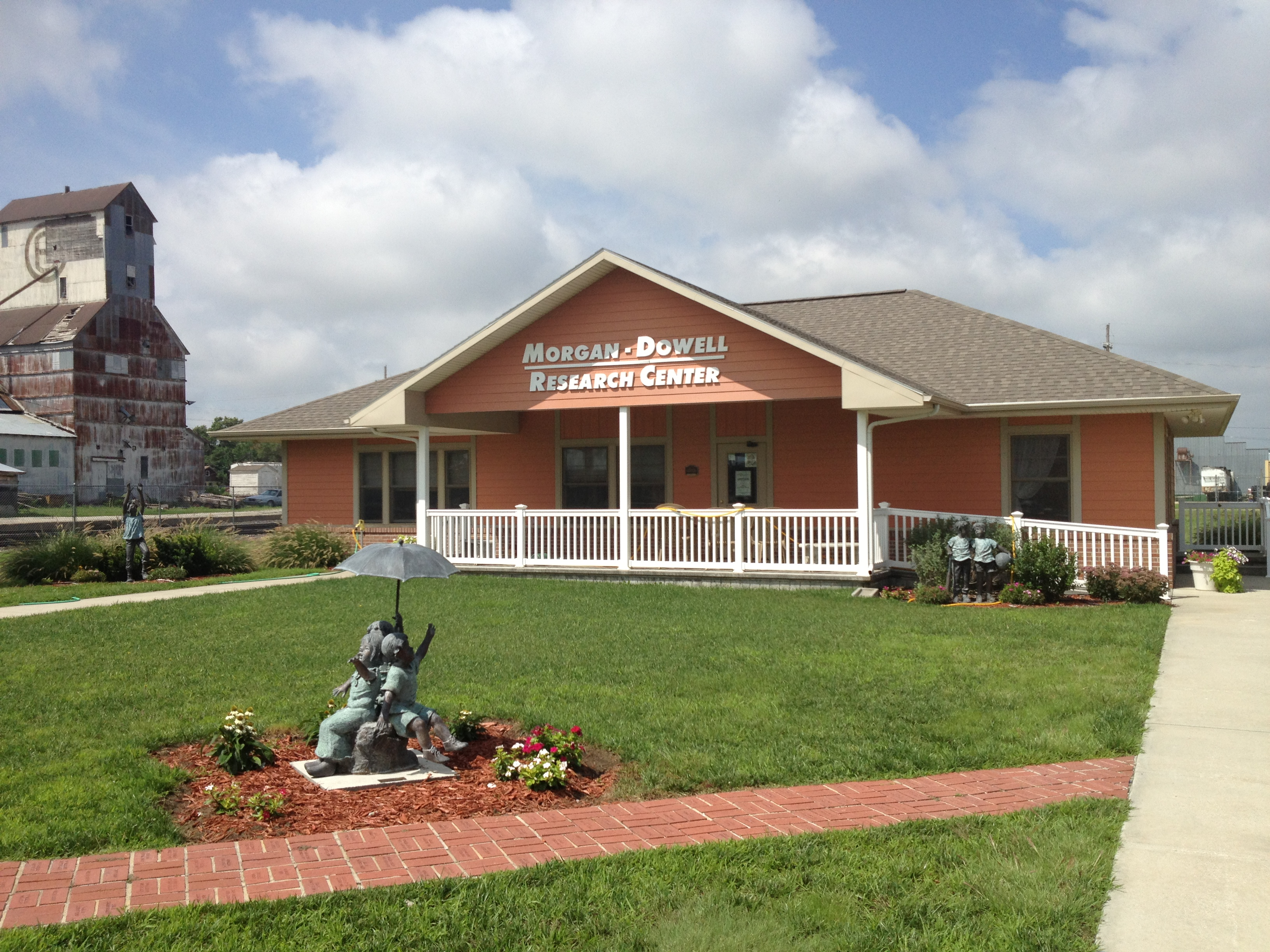
The Morgan-Dowell Research Center

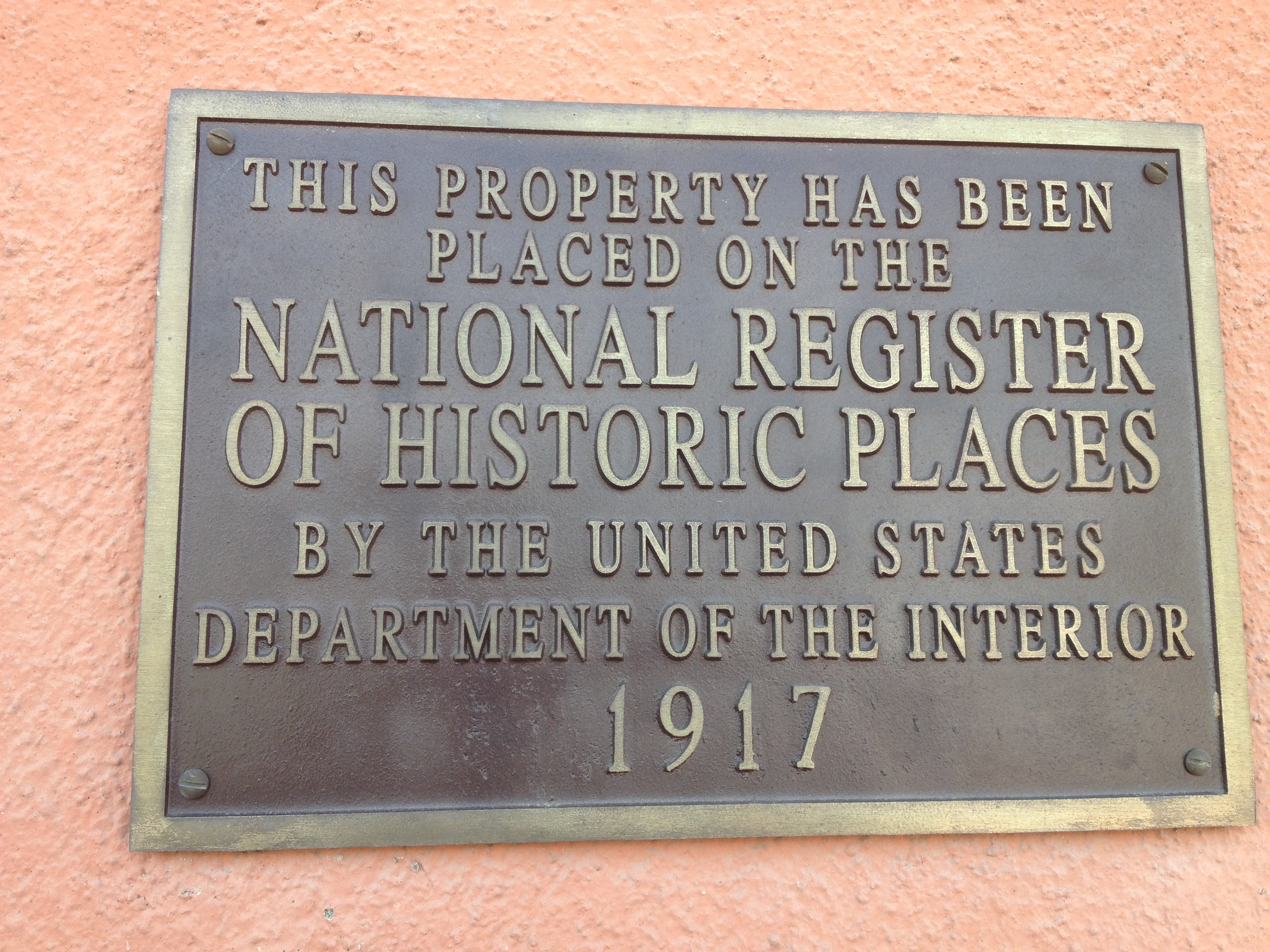
NRHP plaque

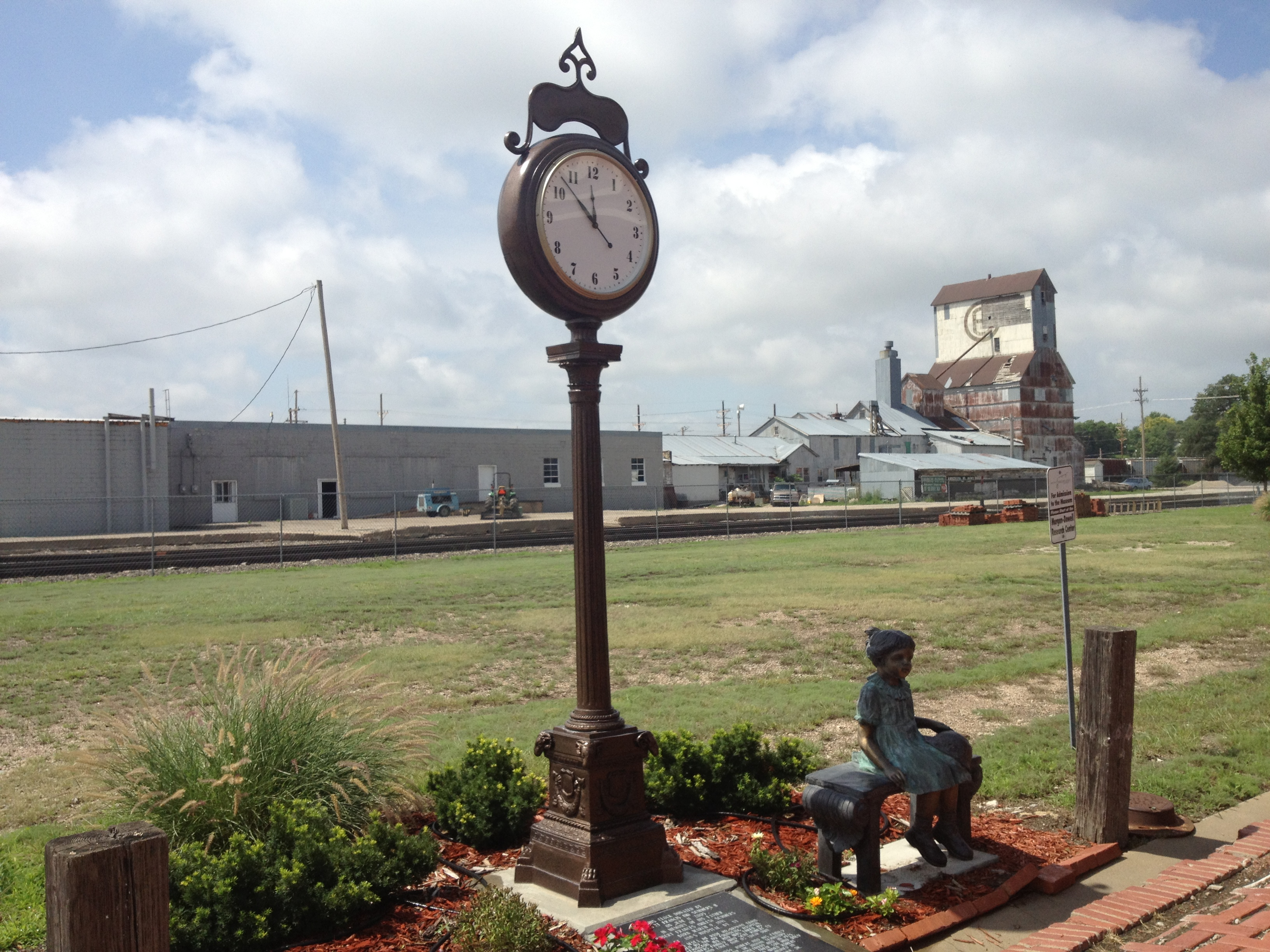
Station clock, with one of numerous statues of children on the grounds.

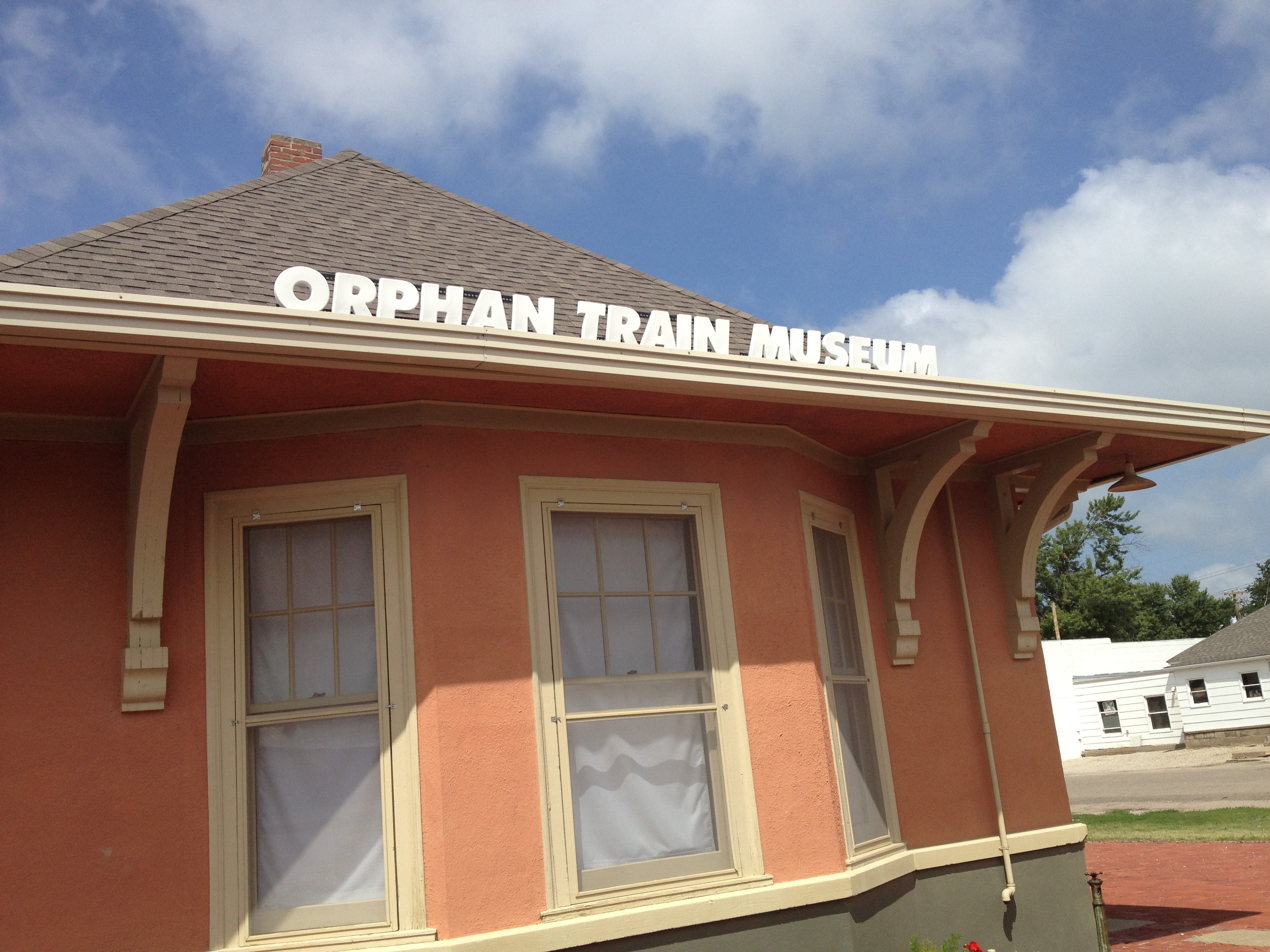
Another sign along the roof of the station

== See also ==
- National Register of Historic Places listings in Cloud County, Kansas

Preceding station	Union Pacific Railroad	Following station
Terminus	Concordia – Junction City	Lawrenceburg toward Junction City
