= Catholic Charities of the Archdiocese of New York =

American charity based in New York, NY

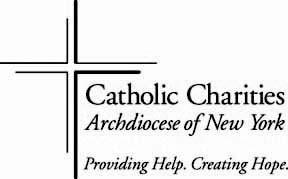

Catholic Charities of the Archdiocese of New York is one of the largest charitable organizations in the New York metropolitan area. It is a federation made up of 90 social service agencies throughout the 10 counties of the Archdiocese of New York - Bronx, Dutchess, New York, Orange, Putnam, Richmond, Rockland, Sullivan, Ulster and Westchester. It is part of a nationwide network of local human service organizations that form Catholic Charities USA—the fourth-largest social service provider in the United States, according to Forbes, and the 10th largest fundraising organization in the United States, according to The Chronicle of Philanthropy.

== Service areas ==
The charity delivers, coordinates and advocates for human services and programs dedicated to alleviating poverty, serving people of all religions and backgrounds, non-Catholics and Catholics alike.

It provides services for children and youth; families in crisis; the hungry, the homeless, and people who are in danger of becoming homeless; the physically and emotionally challenged; and immigrants and refugees.

Services to children and youth include day care, foster care, adoption services, after school / out of school time programs, summer camps, and community centers
Services to the hungry and homeless include emergency meals, eviction prevention, emergency shelters, temporary and transitional residences, and permanent affordable housing
Family services include information and referral, coordinating services, financial assistance, counseling, maternity services, and job readiness and placement.
Services to the physically and emotionally challenged include supportive housing for the mentally challenged, residences for special needs, early intervention and special education
Services for immigrants and refugees include reuniting families, preventing exploitation. obtaining work authorization and finding employment, legal services for immigrants, teaching English and civics, and representing those seeking asylum.

== History ==
=== The Early Years: 1869 ~ 1917 ===
The roots of Catholic Charities New York can be traced to the Catholic Benevolent League, the first major Catholic charitable endeavor in New York, which cared for children abandoned by the War of 1812 and the Civil War. Their orphanage on Prince Street, the predecessor of the New York Foundling Hospital, began operating in 1869, the oldest agency of the Catholic Charities New York federation.

=== The 1920s ~ 1940s ===
During this time, the organization became a provider of emergency meals, financial assistance and expanded programs for the elderly. After World War II, the organization began offering employment services and job programs to support returning veterans, and care was provided for war widows and wives.

=== The 1950s ===
During this decade, Catholic Charities New York opened the Kennedy Child Study Center for early intervention and special education of the intellectually disabled, teaching basic skills and built the foundation enabling children to lead independent lives. It opened a day camp for disabled children, the Catholic Guild for the Blind provided counseling services, and Astor Home for Children was established in Rhinebeck, NY (and later expanded to the Bronx), a residential treatment center for emotionally disturbed children.

=== The 1960s ~ 2000s ===
More than fifty new agencies developed within Catholic Charities New York from 1960 ~ 1980. In the 1980s, emergency homeless shelters opened, while advocacy efforts fought the loss of affordable housing stock.

== Structure ==
The executive staff of Catholic Charities New York is headquartered at the New York Catholic Center in Midtown Manhattan. The agencies are located throughout the counties of the Archdiocese of New York—the Bronx, Dutchess, Manhattan, Orange, Putnam, Rockland, Staten Island, Sullivan, Ulster and Westchester.

- J. Antonio Fernandez is CEO.

=== Board of trustees ===
The board of trustees of Catholic Charities New York provides financial and governance support to the charity.

- William D. Anderson, Jr. is chair; he is a senior managing director at Evercore.
