= Sister Mary Irene FitzGibbon =

American nun

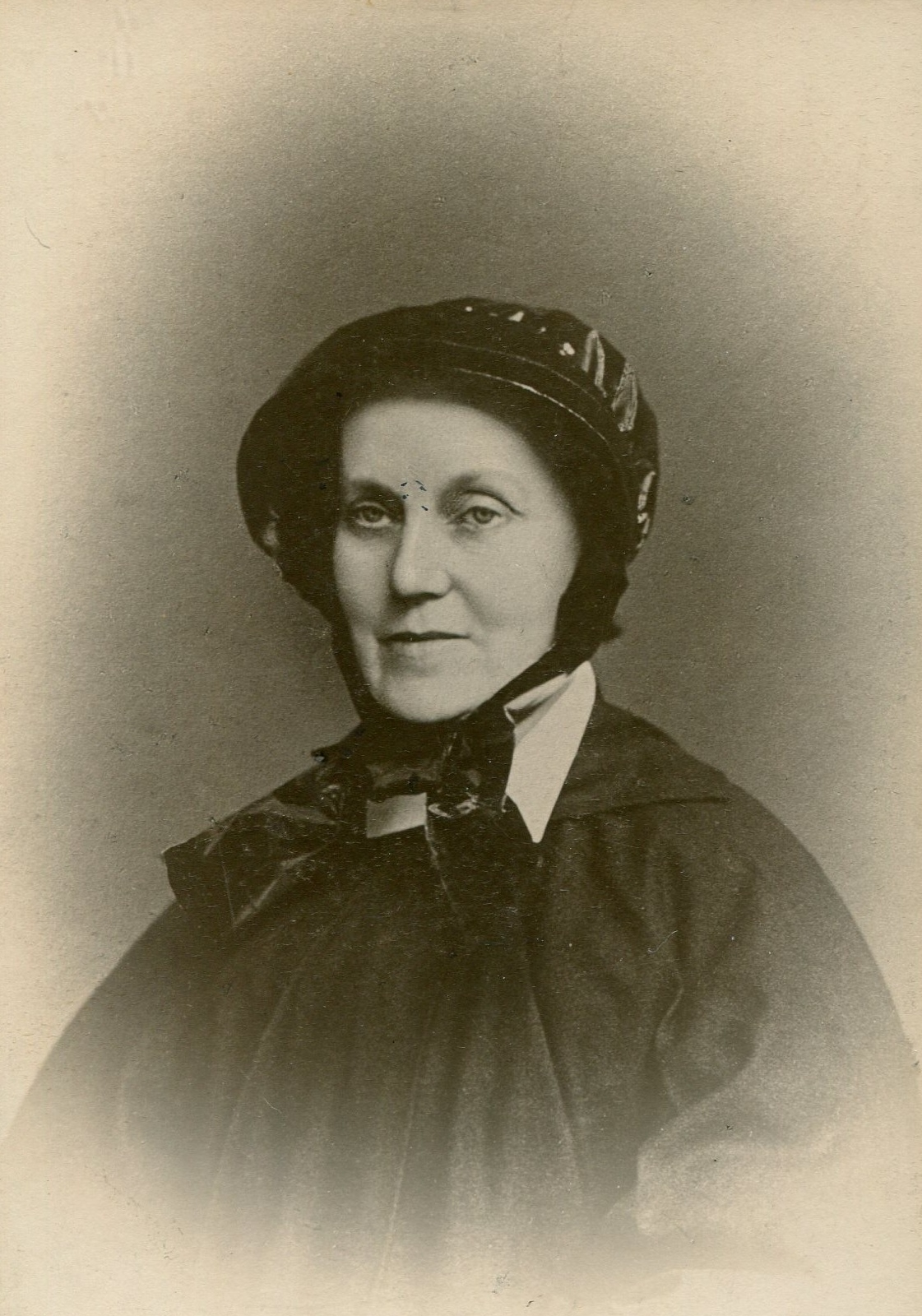
- Sister Irene in an undated photo
- Born: Catherine Rosamund FitzGibbon; May 12, 1823; London, England
- Died: August 14, 1896 (aged 73); New York City, U.S.
- Resting place: Sisters' Cemetery, College of Mount Saint Vincent, Bronx, New York; 40.913465°N 73.906971°W
- Occupation(s): Roman Catholic religious sister, orphanage director, teacher
- Known for: Founder of New York Foundling Hospital

Sister Mary Irene FitzGibbon (born Catherine Rosamund FitzGibbon; May 12, 1823 – August 14, 1896), commonly known as Sister Irene, was an American nun who founded the New York Foundling Hospital in 1869, at a time when abandoned infants were usually sent to almshouses with the sick and insane. The first refuge was in a brownstone on East 12th St. in Manhattan, where babies could be left anonymously in a receiving crib with no questions asked. The practice was an echo of the medieval foundling wheel and an early example of modern "safe haven" practices.

As the number of infants in care grew, the Foundling Hospital came to occupy a full city block between 68th and 69th Streets. In conjunction with her work at the Foundling Hospital, in 1880, Sister Irene founded St. Ann's Maternity Hospital, at 13 East 69th Street.

Sister Irene is among the pioneers of modern adoption, establishing a system to board out children rather than institutionalize them.

== Life ==
Catherine Rosamund FitzGibbon was born May 12, 1823, in Kensington, London to Irish parents. At the age of nine, Catherine emigrated to Brooklyn with her parents, where she attended St. James School, operated by the Sisters of Charity of New York. Having nearly died in the cholera epidemic of 1849, in 1850 she joined the Sisters of Charity of New York, taking the name of Sister Mary Irene. For almost twenty years she taught in St. Peter's parish school on Barclay Street, the first Catholic school in New York State.

Sister Irene died of heart disease at the age of 73. Thousands turned out for her funeral. The New York Herald commented: "Never before in the history of New York has such a tribute been paid." The New York Times hailed her as "that great benefactor of humanity." Sister Irene is buried in the sisters' cemetery at Mt. St. Vincent.

== New York Foundling ==
In the years following the Civil War, it was estimated, some thirty thousand homeless children wandered the streets of New York. Some were unwanted pregnancies, most the children of parents unable to provide for them. Stories of infanticide were common in the newspapers.

Sister Irene, noting a constant increase in the number of homeless and abandoned children and infants, advocated the establishment of a foundling asylum. At that time no public provision was made to take care of abandoned infants. When picked up in the streets, they were sent to the municipal charity institutions to be looked after by the residents there. Almshouses provided no education and were generally an unfavorable environment for a growing child. Often, the conditions were dirty, and orphans were joined in the shelter by those deemed criminal, diseased, or insane. At the almshouses on Blackwell's Island in the East River, children often died from lack of care. Many were left at the doors of the sisters' schools and houses, in the hope that they might receive from them some special consideration. Archbishop John McCloskey sanctioned the project and in 1869 Sister Irene was assigned to put it into effect. After visiting the public homes for infants in several cities she organized a woman's society to collect the necessary funds for the proposed asylum. With those funds a brownstone (17 East Twelfth Street in New York City) was hired, and on October 11, 1869, Sister Irene and Sister Teresa Vincent McCrystal opened the foundling asylum with a cradle placed at the door.

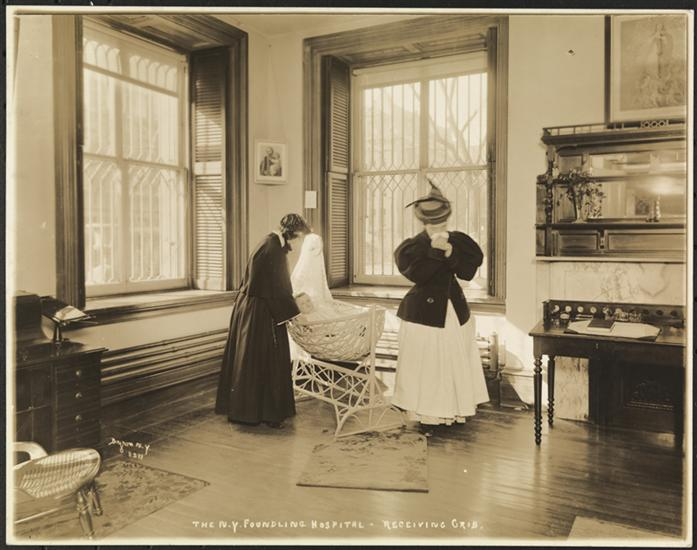
The NY Foundling Hospital - Receiving Crib - circa 1899

The Sisters waited for word to spread, and on the evening the very day it received its first infant, and forty-four others followed before the end of the month. Within a year a larger house (3 Washington Square North) had to be purchased. The New York World wrote: "The infants were not merely abject numbers to her, but precious individuals who deserved complete dignity and loving care."

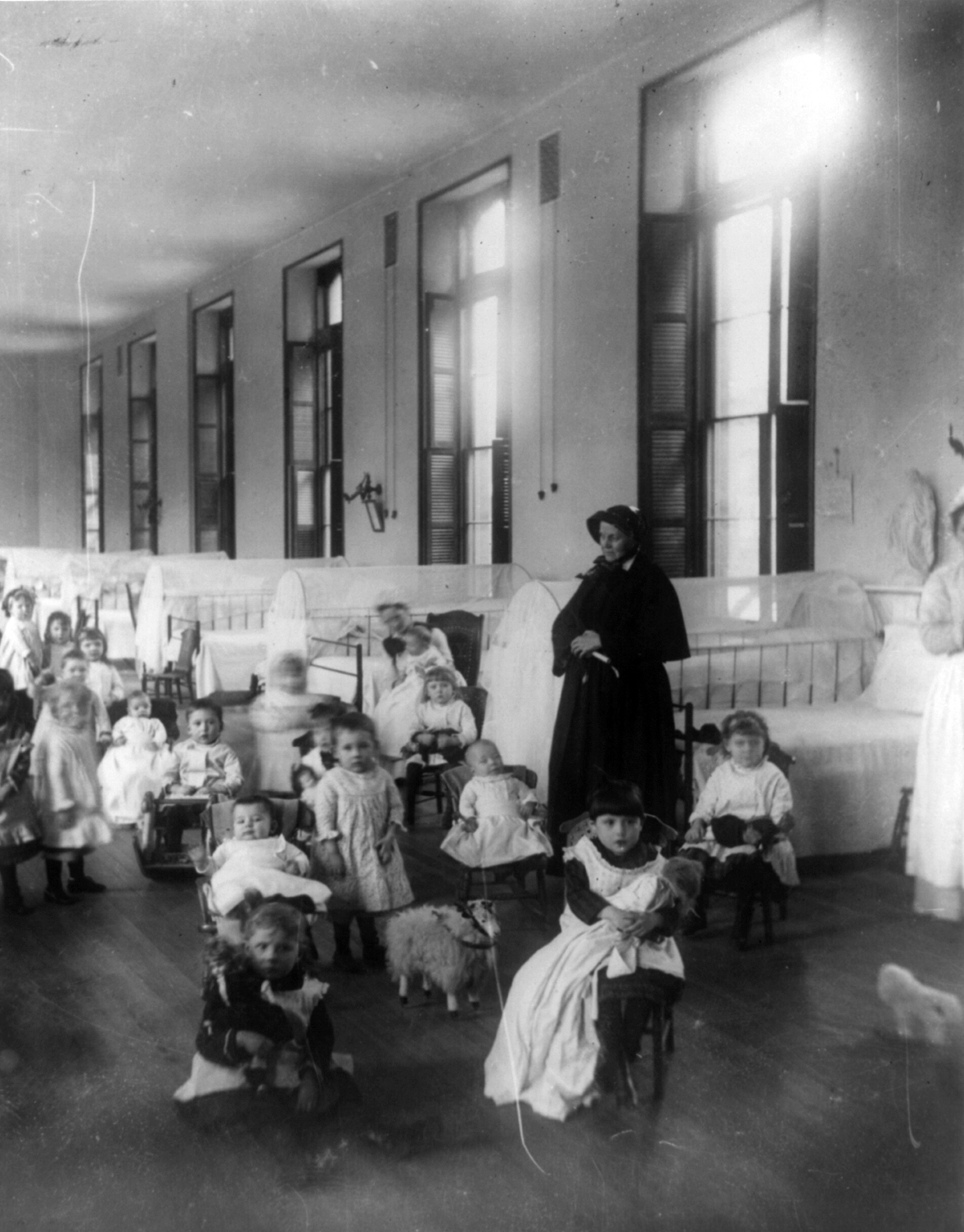
Sister Irene at the New York Foundling Hospital

In 1870 the city was authorized by the Legislature to give the asylum the block bounded by Third and Lexington Avenues, Sixty-eighth and Sixty-ninth Streets for the site of a new building and $100,000 for funding, provided a similar amount was raised by private donation. Of the required sum, $71,500 was realized by a fair held in 1871, and $27,500 came from three private donations. The new building was opened in October, 1873. The name "The Foundling Asylum", under which it was incorporated in 1869, was changed by legal enactment in 1891 to "The New York Foundling Hospital", and it later became a teaching hospital. It was here that Doctor Joseph O'Dwyer developed a life saving method of intubation for children afflicted with diphtheria.

By 1894, a report was given by social reformer Elbridge Thomas Gerry that child murder had been "practically stamped out" in New York City since the hospital's founding.

Forced to develop her own methods of dealing with foundlings and unwed mothers, Sister Irene initiated a program of placing children in foster homes whenever possible, with provision for legal adoption when desired. Needy unwed mothers were given shelter and encouraged to keep and care for their own babies. The practice of having these mothers nurse the foundlings as well cut the mortality rate of infants in care substantially. To further these programs Sister Irene founded three allied institutions: St. Ann's Maternity Hospital in 1880, the Hospital of St. John for Children in 1881, and Nazareth Hospital for convalescent children at Spuyten Duyvil in 1881.

Sister Irene also founded the Seton Hospital for tuberculosis patients in 1894, the cost of which ($350,000) she collected herself. She is credited with the idea of using an open-air porch and windows on both sides to support the circulation of air through hospital units.

Upon her death in 1896, the Foundling Hospital's medical board presented a plaque in Sister Irene's memory, reading: "To the sweet-souled woman, friend of the foundling and fallen, to the best friend any medical board ever had, this tribute is presented."

== Legacy ==
The New York Foundling is one of New York City's oldest and most successful child welfare agencies.

On February 12, 1997, New York City Mayor Rudy Giuliani signed a local law designating the southeast corner of the intersection of Avenue of the Americas and West 17th Street in Manhattan as "Sister Mary Irene Fitzgibbon Corner".
