= New York Foundling =

Child welfare agency active in New York and Puerto Rico

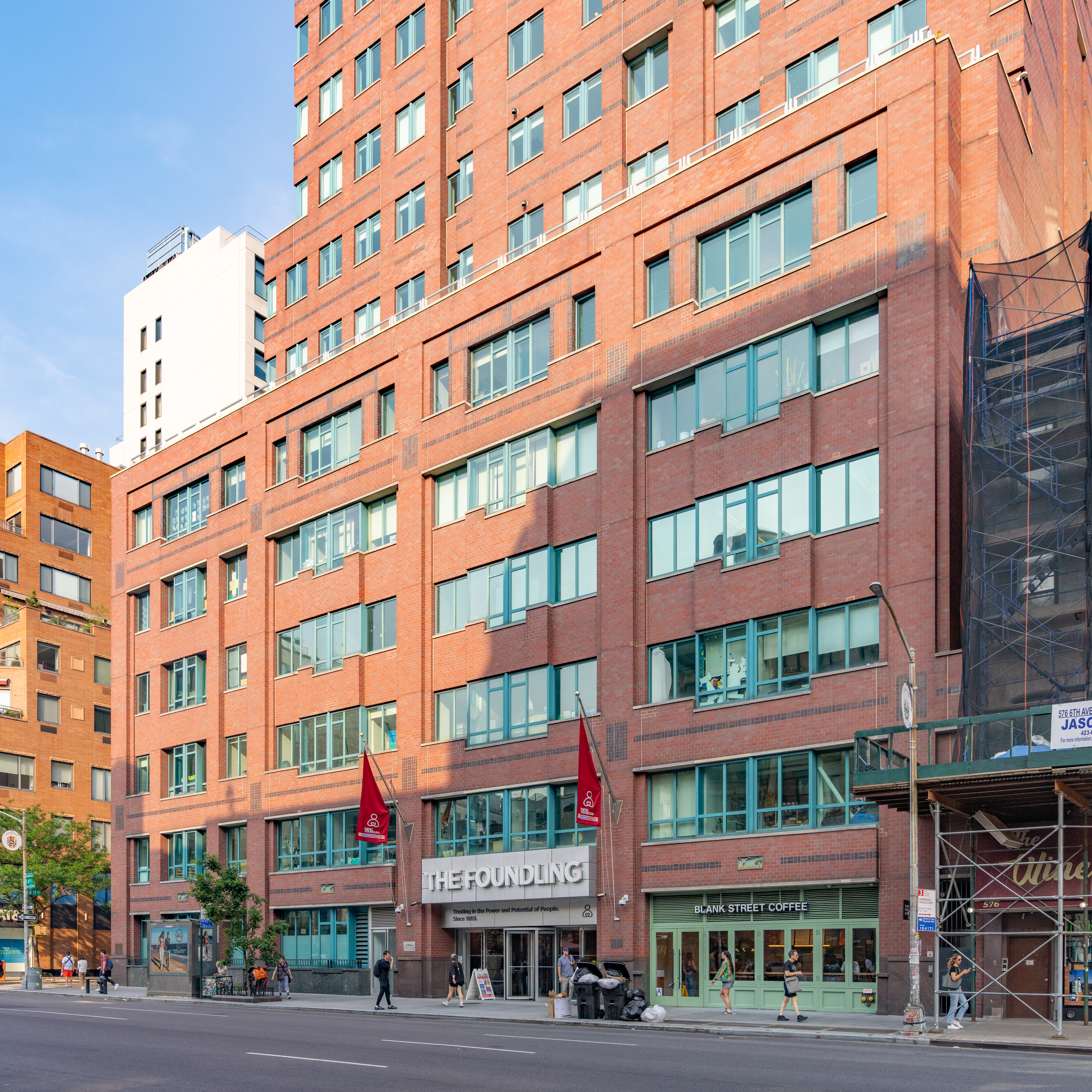
Current Headquarters (2025)

The New York Foundling, founded in 1869 by the Roman Catholic Sisters of Charity, is one of New York City's oldest and largest child welfare agencies. The Foundling operates programs in the five boroughs of New York City, Rockland County, and Puerto Rico. Its services include foster care, adoptions, educational programs, mental health services, and many other community-based services for children, families, and adults.

== History ==
A wave of very poor immigrants and social disruption were among the many conditions that led to an epidemic of infanticide and abandonment during the late 1860s. It was not unusual for the sisters at St. Peter's Convent on Barclay Street to find a tiny waif left on the doorstep. Sister Mary Irene FitzGibbon, of St. Peter's approached Mother Mary Jerome, the Superior of the Sisters of Charity, regarding the need of rescuing these children. Archbishop (afterwards Cardinal) John McCloskey urged the Sisters to open an asylum for such children.

=== The Foundling Asylum (1869–1879) ===
The New York Foundling Asylum of the Sisters of Charity was established on October 8, 1869. Shortly thereafter, Sisters Irene, Teresa Vincent, and Ann Aloysia began operating out of a rented house at 17 East 12th Street in New York's Greenwich Village, where they received an infant on their first night of operation.

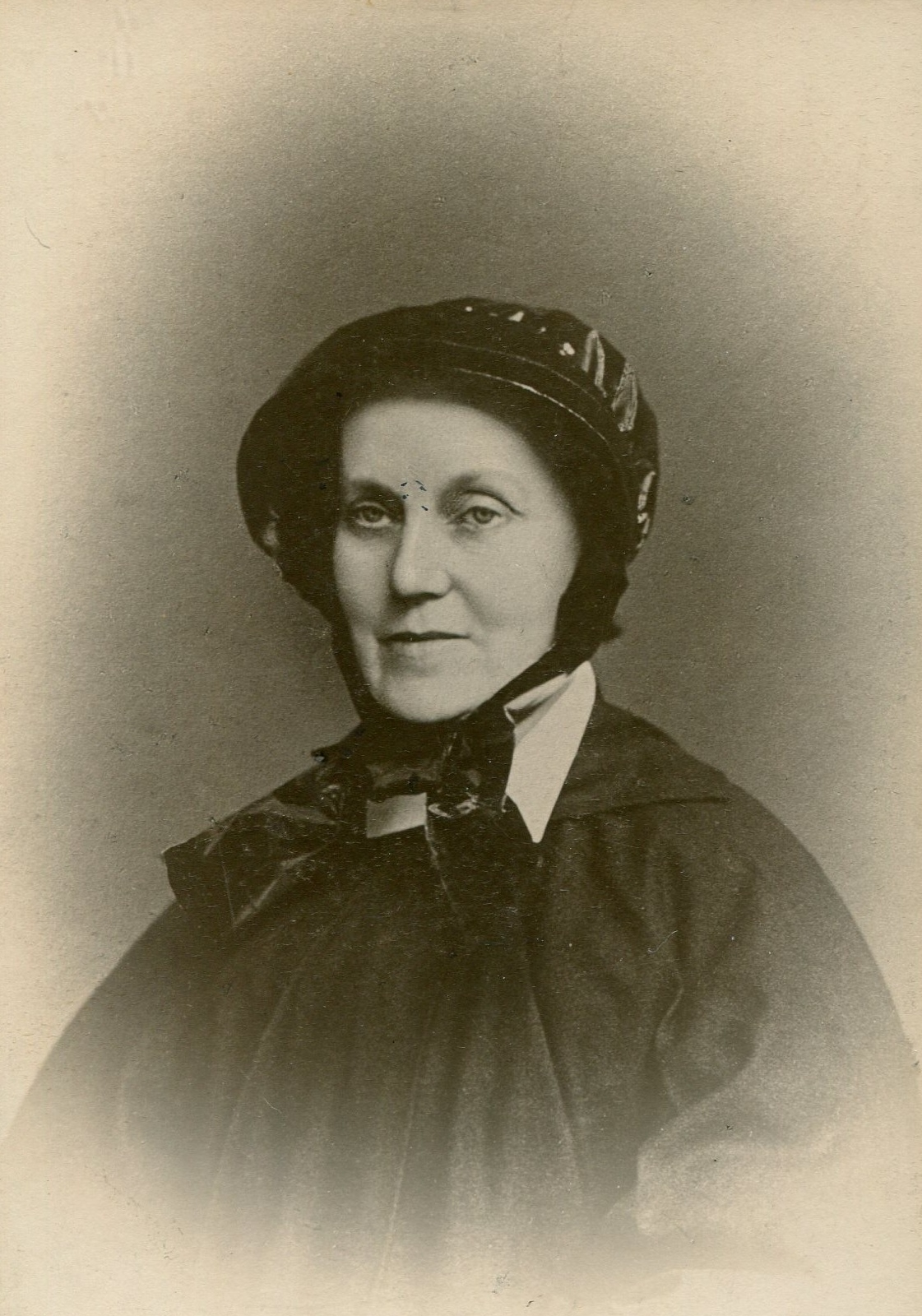
Sister Irene Fitzgibbon in an undated photo

Sister Irene placed a white wicker cradle just inside the front door with the goal of receiving and caring for unwanted children and those whose parents could not properly care for them. 45 more babies followed in that first month. Due to space considerations, the Foundling opened a Boarding department in November and began placing children under the care of neighbours.

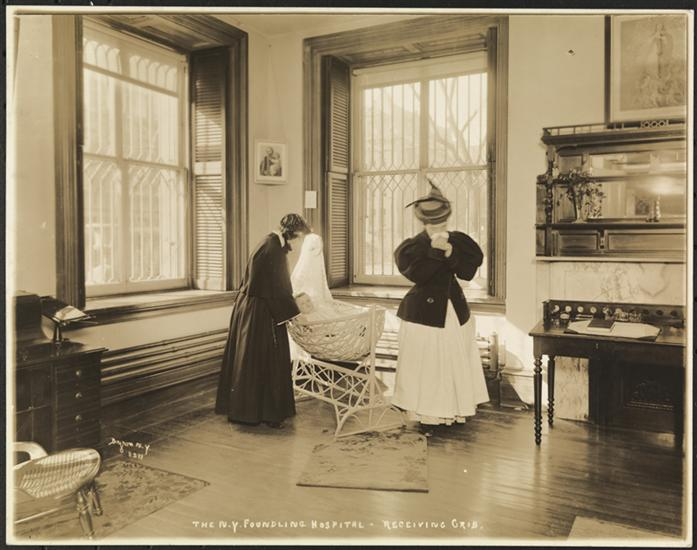
The NY Foundling's receiving crib in an 1899 photo

The need for this type of service was confirmed by the 123 babies that were left by January 1, 1870. Within a year, the Foundling purchased a larger house at 3 Washington Square. After two years, The Foundling had accepted 2,500 babies. The New-York Historical Society has a collection of the notes left with the abandoned babies, which is part of a larger collection of historic photographs of the Foundling maintained by the Society. The Foundling also accepted unmarried mothers.

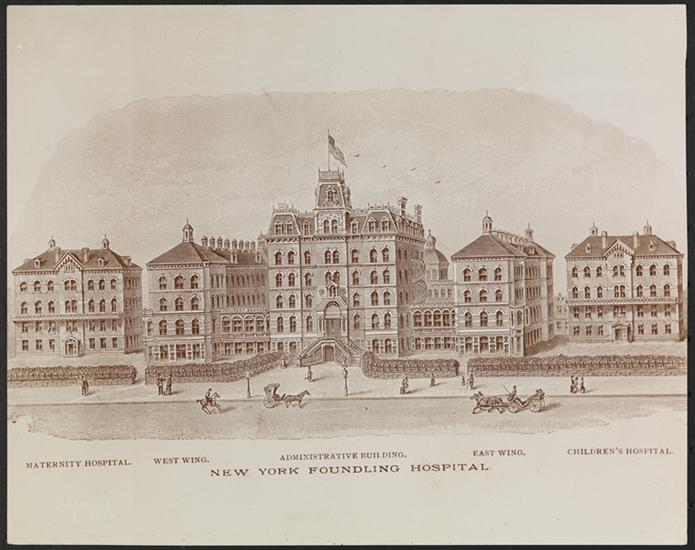
New York Foundling's 1873–1958 site in an 1899 print

With help from a state matching grant, construction began on a new property between East 68th and 69th, Lexington and Third in 1872. An adoption department was established to find permanent homes for children; such placement first occurred in May 1873.

=== "Mercy Trains" and the Case Before the Supreme Court ===
In 1854, the Children's Aid Society (CAS) began transporting children out of New York City into Protestant foster homes in the west, including Catholic children. In an attempt to keep Catholic children in Catholic homes, the Foundling Hospital began their own mercy train efforts and soon grew to a scale that rivaled CAS.

Between 1875 and 1919, the New York Foundling Asylum sent infants and toddlers to pre-arranged Roman Catholic homes. Parishioners in the destination regions were asked to accept children, and parish priests provided applications to approved families. The Foundling Hospital then placed children with families who requested a child. The Foundling's approach to child placements differed from CAS in two respects. First, the organization heavily relied on local priests in states with predominantly Catholic populations to facilitate the placements. Second, it made use of indenture contracts to require host families to raise the children as Catholic. By the 1910s, 1,000 children a year were placed with new families.

The United States Supreme Court case involving the New York Foundling Hospital began when nineteen children were sent to Clifton, Arizona territory, and placed with Roman-Catholic Mexican American families living there. These children stayed with their Mexican American foster parents for less than two days before a group of vigilante white men forcibly removed them and redistributed the children themselves among the wives of leading white citizens.

Neither local authorities or Arizona territory authorities charged the vigilantes criminally. The infant William Norton, at least, was quickly placed under the legal guardianship of John C. Gatti. Gatti was the head of the white household that Norton lived with after his kidnapping and was awarded a letter of legal guardianship by the probate court of Graham County, Arizona.

In an attempt return the children to their care, the New York Foundling Hospital filed 17 writs of habeas corpus with the local sheriff. This legal effort was led by Eugene Semme Ives. William Norton's case was taken to the Arizona Supreme Court. However, the court held that it was in the best interests of Norton to remain in the care of John Gatti.

The New York Foundling Hospital appealed the case of William Norton to the United States Supreme Court, and oral arguments in New York Foundling Hospital v. Gatti were made in April 1906. In October of the same year, Justice William Rufus Day released the opinion of the court. Ruling narrowly on the case as an issue of statutory interpretation, Day decided that it was improper to use the writ of habeas corpus in custody cases, as children are not entitled to personal freedom. William Norton and the other children remained in the homes the vigilantes had placed them in.

This controversy, as well as other incidents regarding accusations that documents were forged to place non-Catholic children with Catholic families, prompted further condemnation of placing out which eventually led the Foundling to stop placing children in the West.

=== The Foundling Hospital (1880–1957) ===
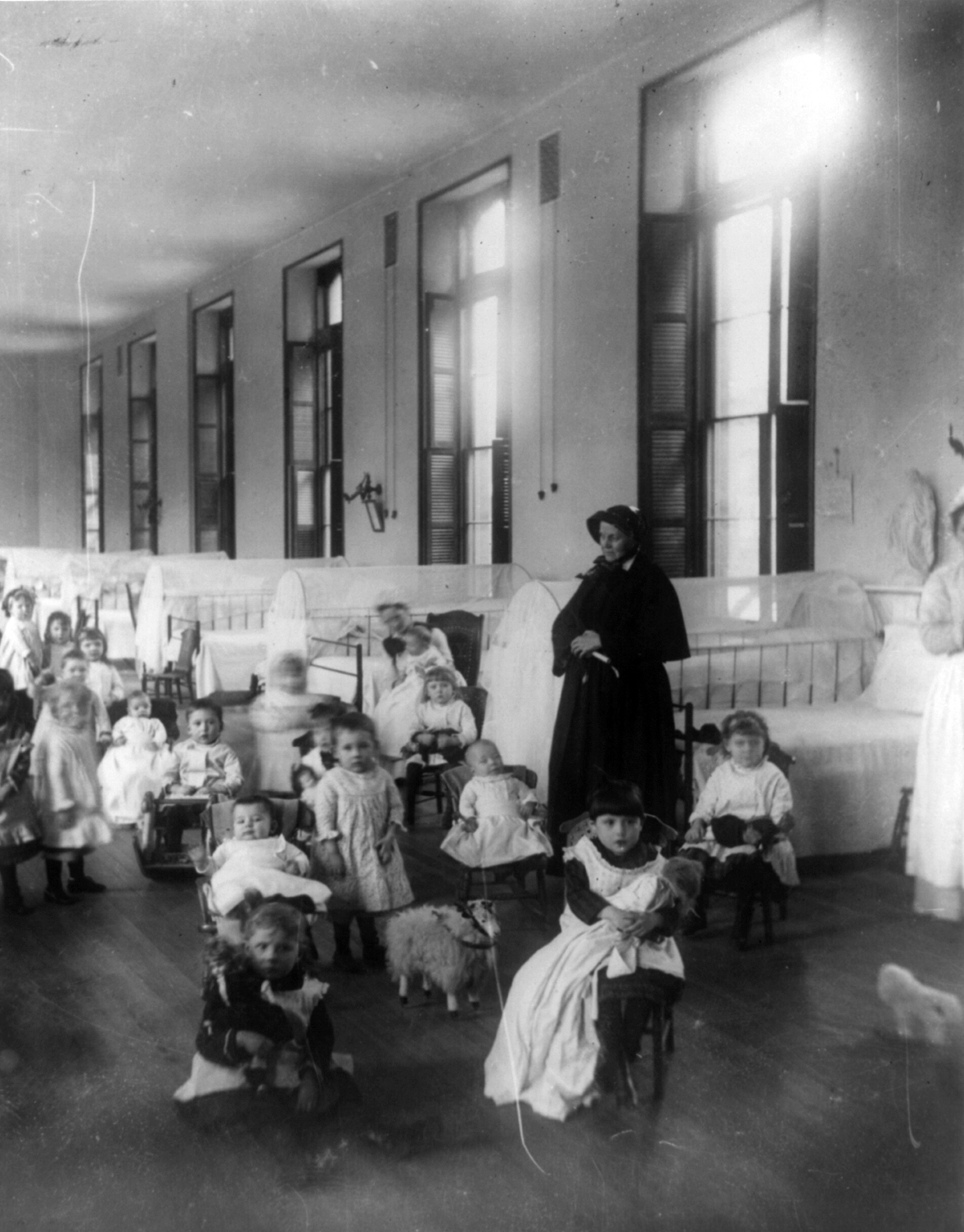
Sister Irene and children, 1888

In response to an increasing need for skilled medical and nursing care for mothers and children, The New York Foundling began providing health services in addition to social services, changing its name to The New York Foundling Hospital to more accurately reflect its services. The hospital was located between 68th and 69th Streets and between Lexington and Third Avenues.

Among its medical programs was St. Ann's Hospital (opened 1880), which provided unmarried mothers with medical treatment; and St. John's Hospital for Sick Children (1882), which was at the forefront of developing pediatric practices and approaches to caring for children in a hospital setting. The practice of intubation was invented by Founding Hospital staff member Dr. Joseph O'Dwyer. This method of keeping airways open saved thousands of children from the life-threatening disease diphtheria, an epidemic at the time.

In 1881 Sister Mary Irene established one of the first day nurseries for pre-school children of working mothers.

Beginning in 1945, The Foundling also operated a developmental clinic to observe, examine and analyze the developmental norms for young children. The clinic became a learning center for students from New York City area medical schools, nursing schools, and psychology departments. These programs were the beginning of, and were subsequently incorporated into, what became Saint Vincent's Hospital in New York City.

While The Foundling provided medical treatment in addition to adoption and support services for mothers-in-need, it wasn't until the 1930s that a Social Service department was established to assist those who could not properly care for their children.

== The New York Foundling today ==
The New York Foundling's administrative headquarters are located at 590 Avenue of the Americas, in Chelsea with additional locations across the five boroughs of New York City, Rockland County, Westchester County, Putnam County, and Puerto Rico.

In 2006, The New York Foundling received accreditation from the Council on Accreditation (COA), an international, independent, not-for-profit, child- and family-service and behavioral healthcare organization, which sets standards for service delivery.

== Programs, services and initiatives ==
=== Foster care and adoption ===
The New York City Administration for Children's Services (ACS) refers children to organizations like The New York Foundling for placement with a foster family and for additional support services. Some foster children are able to be reunited with their birth parents while others may find a permanent home through placement with a blood relative or through adoption.

Providing foster care for children whose parents are unable to care for them has been a core component of The Foundling's mission since its founding. In recent years, foster care practices have shifted toward evidence-based interventions that are proven to support happy, healthy, and functioning families. The Foundling's current foster care model, Child Success NYC (CSNYC), was launched in 2012 and is a multifaceted approach geared toward improving outcomes for the children.

The New York Foundling's foster care program is responsible for approximately 700 children at any given time (roughly 1,200 per year) and range from newborns up to age 21.

=== Vincent J. Fontana Center for Child Protection ===
The Vincent J. Fontana Center for Child Protection was founded in 1998 by Doctor Vincent J. Fontana, who served as medical director of The Foundling for over 40 years. The Fontana Center is dedicated to furthering the understanding and detection of child abuse and neglect, and to teaching prevention and treatment.

=== Mott Haven Academy Charter School ===
In 2008, The Foundling opened the Mott Haven Academy Charter School. The first charter school of its kind in the nation, Haven Academy uses a trauma-sensitive curriculum designed to meet the unique educational needs of kids in the child welfare system. One-third of Haven Academy's seats are reserved for scholars in foster care, and another third are reserved for those who receive services to prevent them from entering foster care. Approximately 23 percent of the school's non-foster care population are homeless, returning to a shelter each night after school.

Haven Academy is housed in a colorful building, with two teachers and a maximum of 26 students per classroom. Art, music, or dance is offered daily. There are two social workers – a behavioral specialist and an outreach worker – at the school. There is also an after-school leadership program and summer camp offered to Haven Academy students through The Foundling.

=== Juvenile Justice Programs ===
The New York Foundling has five juvenile justice programs geared toward achieving better outcomes for juvenile offenders:

- Blue Sky – Intervention strategies to treat young offenders while they remain at home and in the community,
- Arrow – Serves teens with psychiatric impairment,
- Kids Experiencing Young Successes (KEYS) – Serves at-risk youth with family and community intervention strategies,
- Families Rising – Uses Functional Family Therapy for older teens charged with a crime to keep them out of detention,
- Way Home – Works with parents and youth in a family therapy model designed to build bridges and result in a safer, more effective, and more secure family environment.

=== Deaf Services ===
Family Services for Deaf Children and Adults at The New York Foundling is a preventive program for families in which there is one or more deaf members. The program began in 1982. Staff are fluent in American Sign Language and provide a variety of home-based services based on families' assessed needs.

=== Programs for Individuals with Developmental Disabilities ===
The New York Foundling began its program to help individuals with developmental disabilities in 1974 with the opening of a group home in Nyack, NY. Since then, The New York Foundling has expanded and now provides services to nearly 300 individuals and their families each year.

=== Head Start Programs: Puerto Rico ===
Since 1984, The New York Foundling has operated Head Start and Early Head Start programs in Puerto Rico. The goal of these programs is to improve social and educational outcomes for children and families in impoverished areas of the island.
