= Joseph O'Dwyer =

American physician

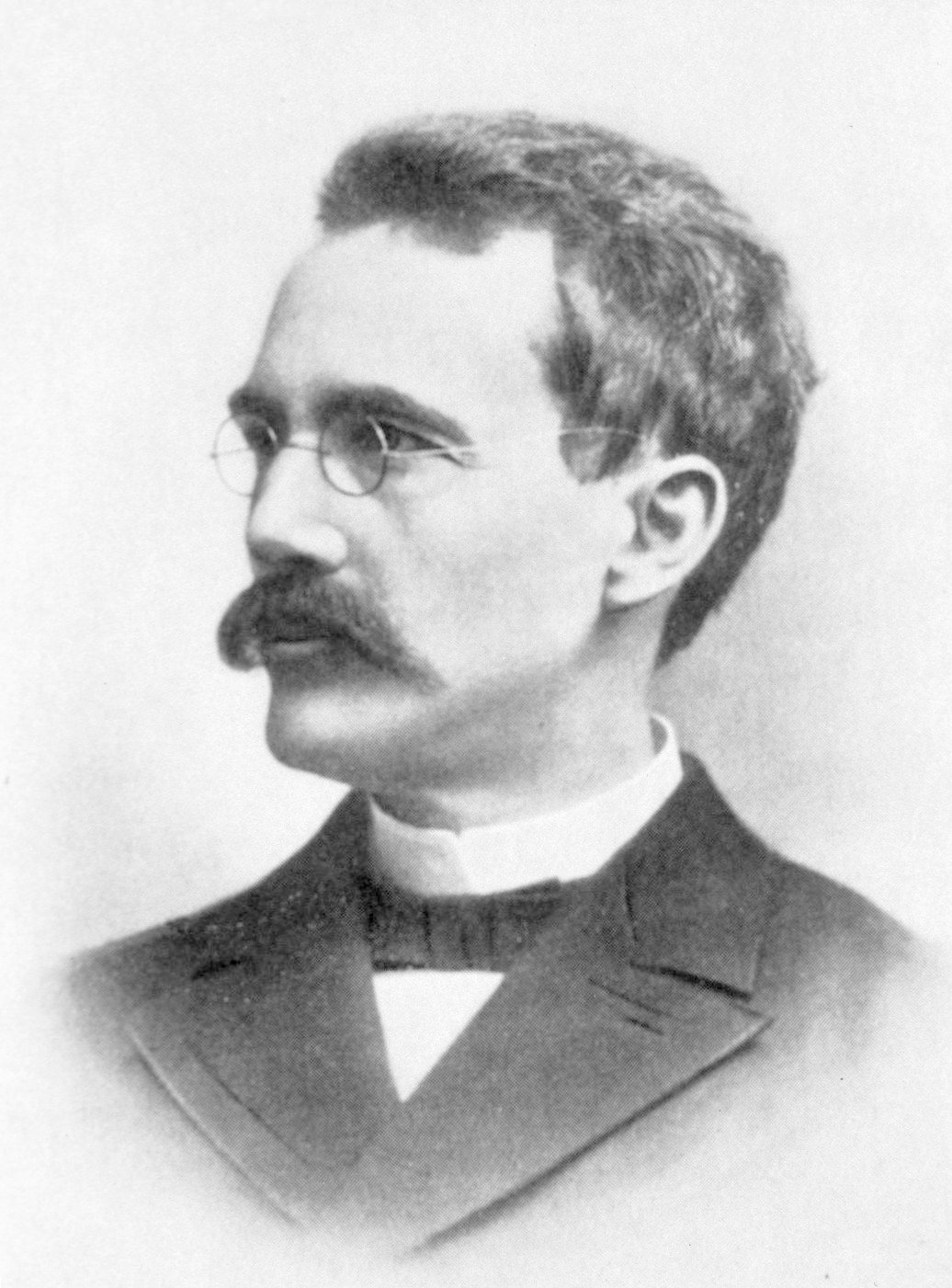
- Joseph O'Dwyer
- Born: October 12, 1841; Cleveland, Ohio, US
- Died: January 7, 1898 (aged 56)
- Education: College of Physicians and Surgeons
- Occupation: Physician
- Known for: Laryngeal intubation advances
- Medical career
- Sub-specialties: Pneumonia, diphtheria

Joseph O'Dwyer (October 12, 1841 – January 7, 1898) was an American physician. He developed a valuable system of intubation in diphtheria cases. O'Dwyer is often cited as the "father of laryngeal intubation in croup".

== Life ==
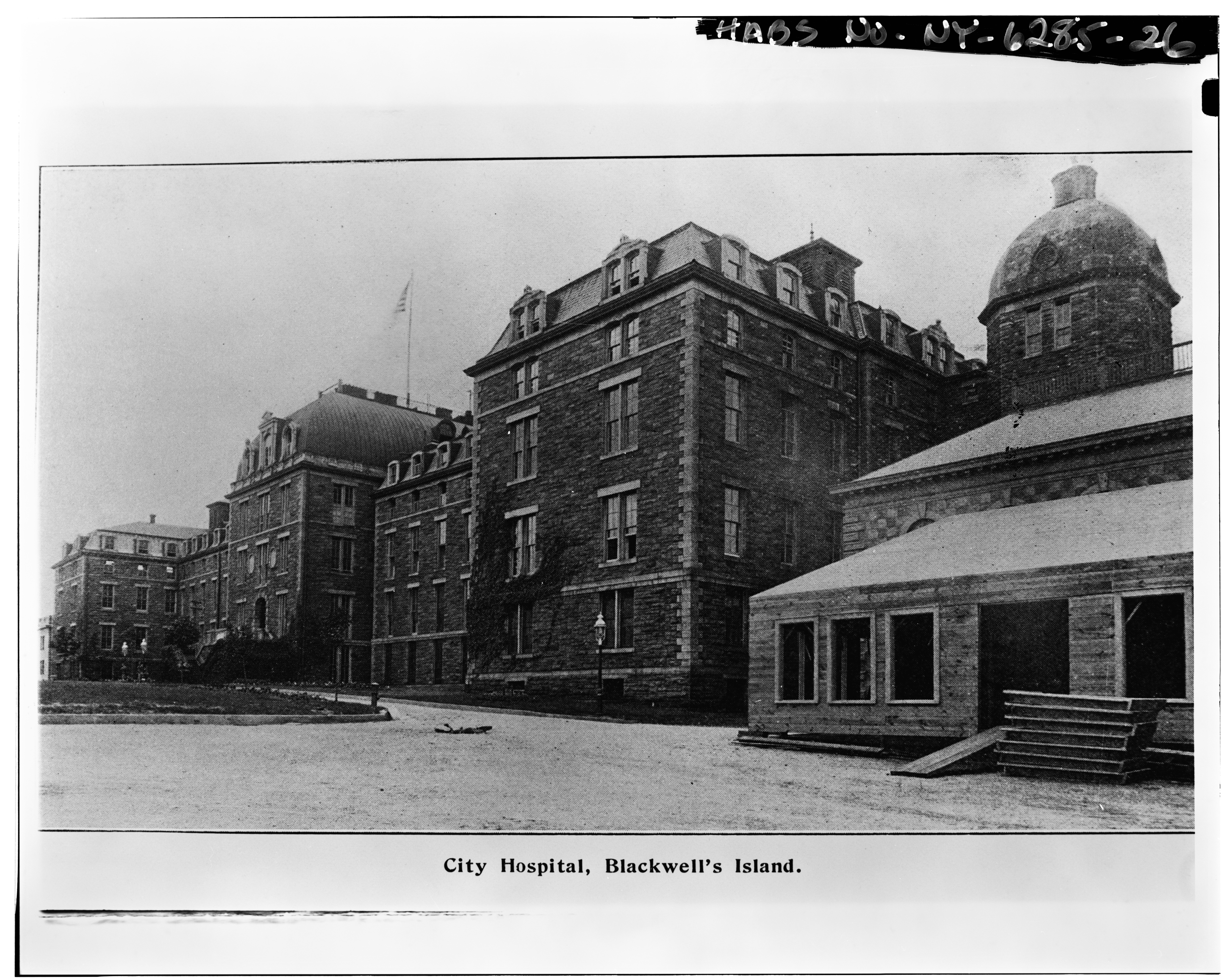
'City Hospital, Blackwell's Island'

Joseph P. O'Dwyer was born on October 12, 1841, in Cleveland, Ohio, and was educated in London, Ontario. After two years of apprenticeship in the office of one Dr. Anderson, he entered the College of Physicians and Surgeons in New York from which he was graduated in 1865. He won first place in the competitive examination for resident physicians of New York's Charity Hospital, on Blackwell's Island. The island housed a penitentiary, women's asylum, and other facilities for the criminal, the insane, and the destitute.

Opened in 1860, City Hospital was renamed Charity Hospital in 1870, and was among New York City's largest institutions for the treatment of illnesses among the poor. O'Dwyer was in charge of the medical service during a cholera epidemic. During his service, a typhus epidemic also broke out. O'Dwyer contracted typhus, but made a full recovery. After the completion of his service, in 1868 he set up in private practice on Second Avenue near Fifty-fifth St. Four years later (1872), he moved to Lexington Avenue near Sixty-sixth St. and began his long association with the New York Foundling Asylum.

== Intubation ==
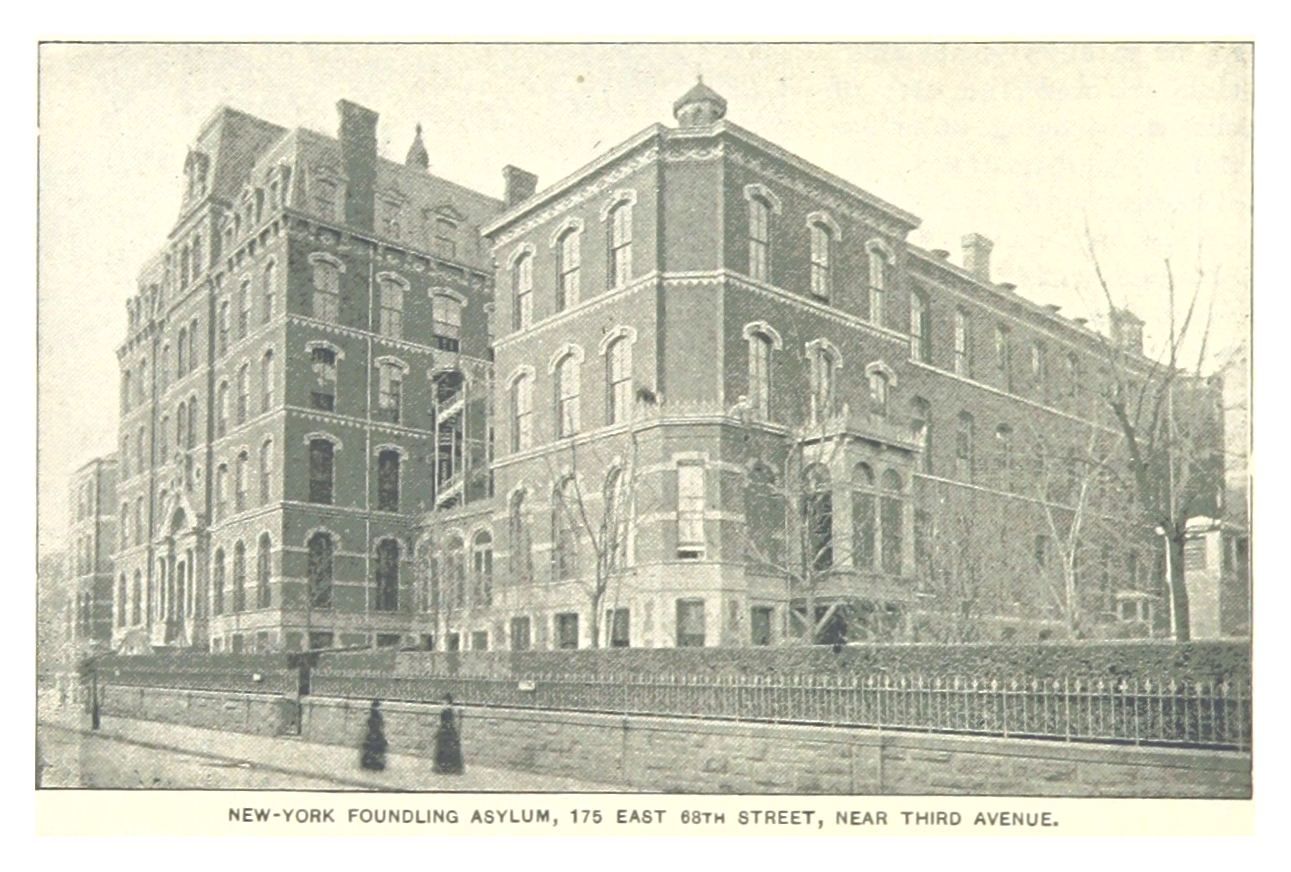
New York Foundling Asylum, 175 East 68th Street

In the 1800s diphtheria was a devastating disease, especially lethal in children. The cause of death was usually asphyxia due to an obstructed airway.

A tracheotomy was often a necessary procedure to save a patient suffering with diphtheria from suffocation. This was, at that time, a high-risk procedure, even post-operative. In 1858, Paris pediatrician Eugene Bouchut devised a method to bypass the diphtheria pseudomembrane obstructing the larynx without resorting to a tracheotomy. However, Bouchut's proposal was not well received, due in part to the opposition of Armand Trousseau, the known authority on tracheotomies.

The use of tracheotomy had fallen into disrepute at the Foundling Hospital with a record 100% death rate, among children due to suffocation when diphtheria brought about closure of the larynx. O'Dwyer and his colleague at the Foundling Hospital, W.P.Northrup, experimented with various approaches to keep the laryngeal airway open. At first, O'Dwyer experimented with his device on cadavers.

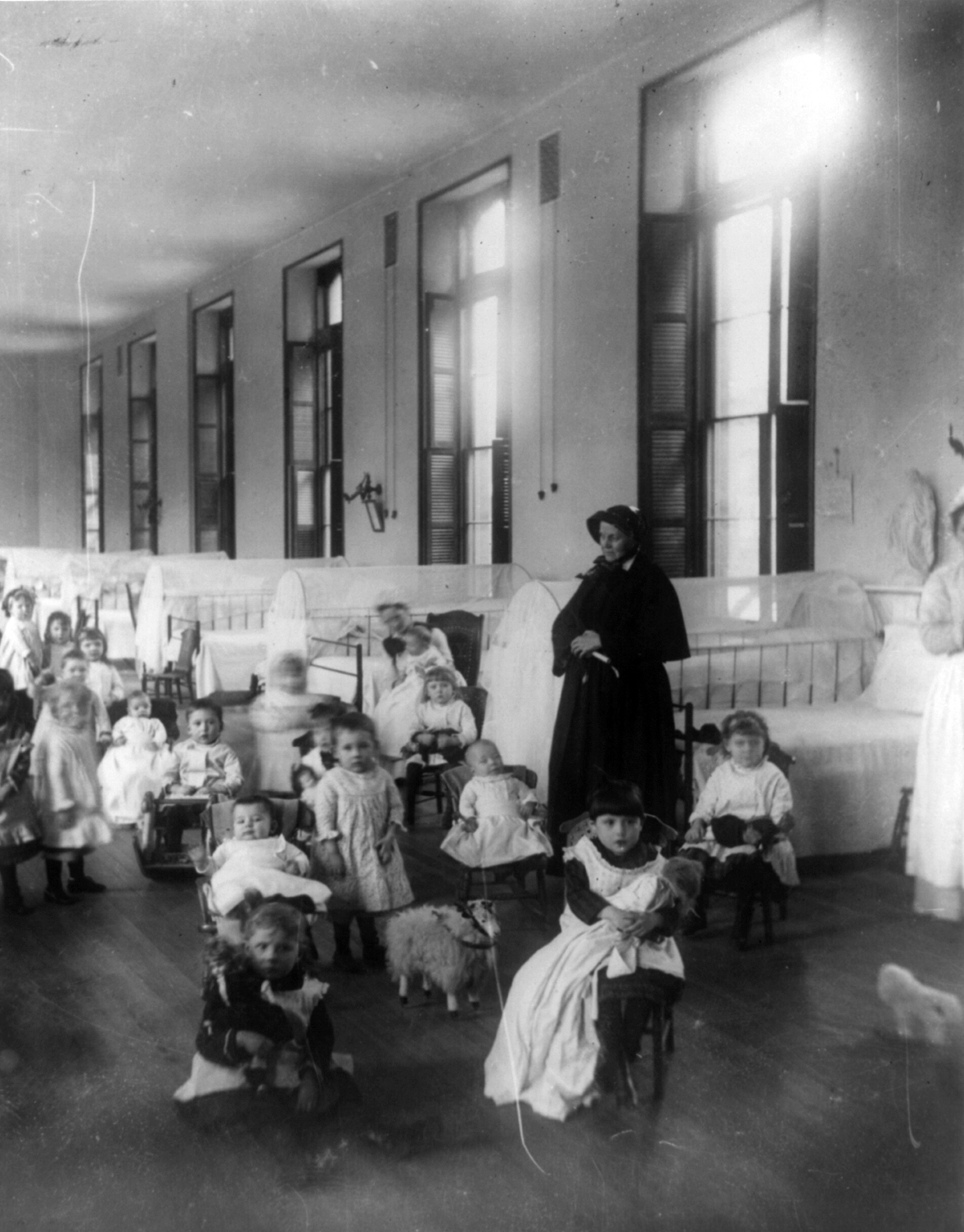
Sr. Irene with children at New York Foundling

The use of a tube for intubation had often been attempted but unsuccessfully. After five years of study, working with surgeon George Fell, by 1885 O'Dwyer had devised a set of tubes of graduating in size to fit children from one to ten years of age. He also developed a procedure for the insertion and extraction of the tube, using specially designed instruments. After a number of refinements the final tubes, made by George Tiemann and Company of New York, were made of brass, lined with gold, and came in five different sizes. These were later supplanted by Annandale's rubber endotracheal tube. The method proved successful in relieving difficulty in breathing. In 1885, O'Dwyer presented his findings. According to Sperati and Felisanti, O'Dwyer's modifications in Bouchut's concept "were determinant". O'Dwyer's tubes of hard rubber or metal had rounded edges and were therefore, well tolerated.

The O'Dwyer Method was first published in the New York Medical Journal in 1888, as "Intubation of the Larynx". O'Dwyer's design was supported by Abraham Jacobi, the leading pediatrician at that time. O’Dwyer's tubes and method was quickly adopted by American physicians and became the first widely used endotracheal technique. Before his death it was universally acknowledged that he had made the most important practical discovery of his generation. Use of O'Dwyer's intubation tubes required considerable practice. O'Dwyer wrote and spoke extensively to educate his fellow practitioners. His tubes and the accompanying instruments for intubation and extubation, with his methods for the care of these patients, came to be employed throughout the medical world, gradually reducing the use of tracheotomy for croup, and thereby "leading to a significant reduction in the death rate".

Bouchut and O'Dwyer met in Berlin in 1890 at the X International Congress of Medicine which focused on laryngeal intubation, and where both acknowledged the other's contribution to the development of the procedure. Afterwards O'Dwyer devoted himself to the study of pneumonia. In 1896 he served as president of the American Pediatric Society. He was also active at Presbyterian Hospital.

The O'Dwyer method replaced tracheotomy until around 1895 when the development of antitoxins for diphtheria became more common. When the development of antitoxins reduced the need for intubations, O'Dwyer was among the early practitioners to switch from intubation where appropriate.

== Death ==
W.P. Northrup wrote, "Intubation is O'Dwyer's monument. It is equally true that it killed him." By this Northrup refers to the fact that others rushed to adopt the still developing technique, resulting in a variety of negative results due in large part to their own inexperience. Correspondence from these untrained practitioners caused O'Dwyer a great deal of stress. "All the unhappy results all tales of misadventure, and all the unfavorable criticisms came directly to him." Still grieving his late wife, O'Dwyer worried much and slept little.

In December 1897 he developed symptoms of a diphtheria-related myocardiopathy, likely contracted while treating a young patient. He died on January 7, 1898. Known for his charities, Dr. O'Dwyer had declined to patent his invention, thereby sacrificing large pecuniary gains. O'Dwyer did not make much money from the development of his intubation method and according to his friend Northrup, "died poor". The trustees of Columbia's College of Physicians and Surgeons established the O'Dwyer Scholarship to provide for the education of his son and namesake, which then was allowed to lapse upon Joseph Jr.'s graduation. Family friends arranged for the education of his three other sons.

== Legacy ==
His work at the Foundling Hospital helped greatly to make that institution one of the best of its kind. In private practice, O'Dwyer attended over 3,000 confinements, many of them in poor neighborhoods.

O'Dwyer introduced the use of tubes in children with diphtheritic pseudomembranes in the larynx, to substantially increase their survival chances at a time when tracheotomy still had a high failure rate. The tubes proved of great value in stenosis of the larynx due to various other diseases and to strictures of the larynx, especially consequent on burns or scalds. Subsequent modifications further enhanced its application. The Fell-O'Dwyer apparatus supplied practical instrumentation for intermittent positive pressure ventilation. The Fell-O'Dwyer Apparatus was widely used in cases of asphyxia, even in those caused by overdosage of anaesthetics. Some of his pioneering work anticipated methods of intensive care medicine.
