= Incarnation Children's Center =

Medical facility in New York City

Coordinates: 40°50′36″N 73°56′12″W

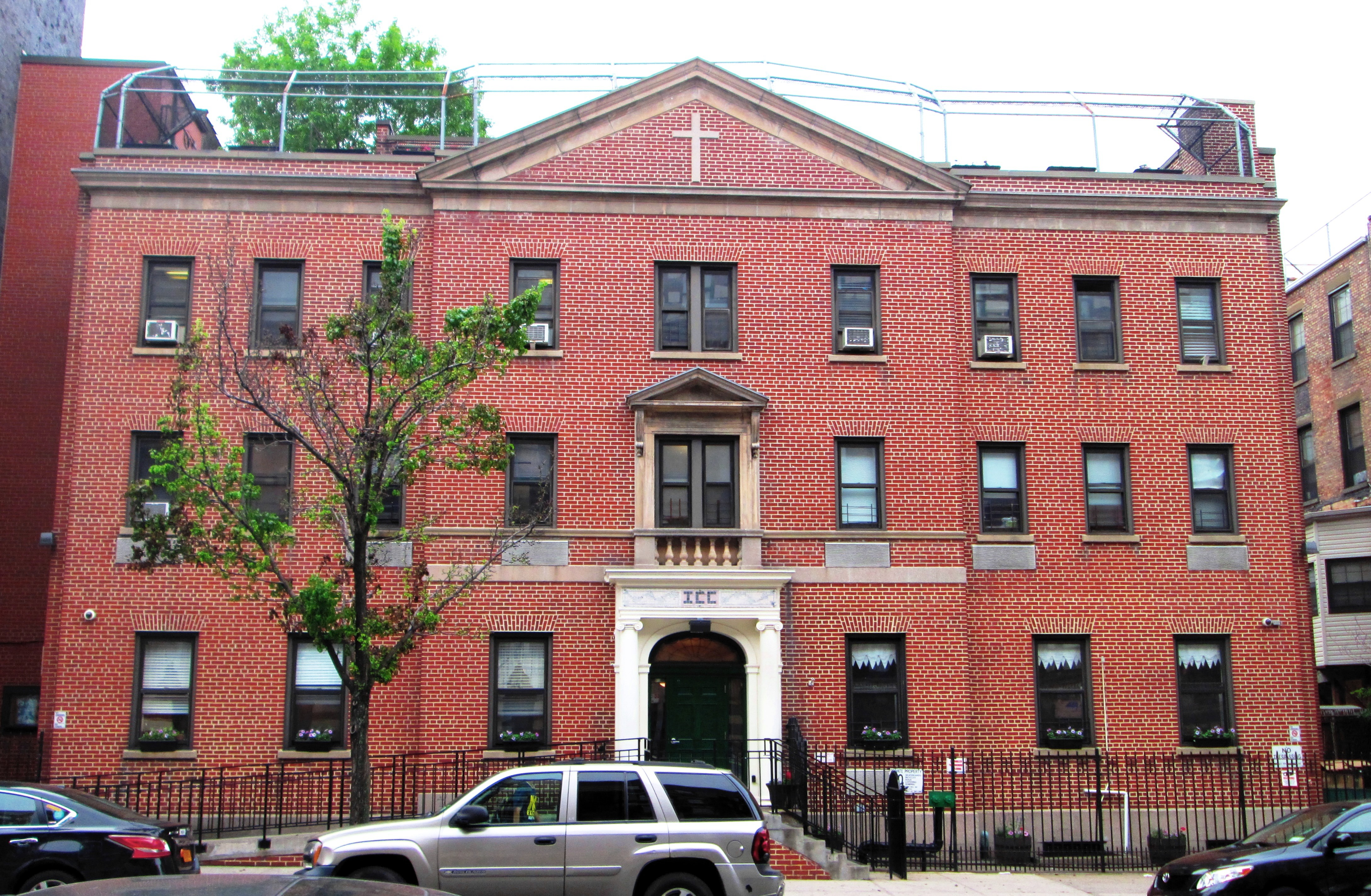
The Incarnation Children's Center, located at 142 Audubon Avenue between West 172nd and 173rd Streets in the Washington Heights neighborhood of Manhattan, New York City, is part of the Roman Catholic Church of the Incarnation, at 1290 St. Nicholas Avenue (Juan Pable Duarte Boulevard).

Incarnation Children's Center (ICC) is a non-profit corporation and a nursing facility for children living with HIV in New York City. It is affiliated with the Archdiocese of New York and Columbia University.

From 1989 until 2000, the center operated as a foster care boarding home. Since then, it has concentrated on providing medical care.

From the late 1980s through 2005, foster children at the center with HIV/AIDS were enrolled on clinical trials of antiretroviral medication, successfully reducing the death rate from AIDS. In 2005, the center was the focus of "Guinea Pig Kids", a BBC documentary alleging ethical violations in these clinical trials. The allegations prompted an investigation by the Vera Institute of Justice, which concluded that no children had died as a result of the trials, but that the center had kept poor records and sometimes failed to follow its own enrollment policies. Subsequently, the BBC apologized for "very serious issues" in "Guinea Pig Kids", and conceded that the documentary made misleading allegations and was biased toward the views of AIDS denialists.
