= Eminent domain in the United States =

In the United States, eminent domain is the power of a state or the federal government to take private property for public use while requiring just compensation to be given to the original owner. It can be legislatively delegated by the state to municipalities, government subdivisions, or even to private persons or corporations, when they are authorized to exercise the functions of public character.

Property taken by eminent domain may be for government use or by delegation to third parties, who will devote it to public or civic use or, in some cases, to economic development. The most common uses are for government buildings and other facilities, public utilities, highways and railroads. However, it may also be taken for reasons of public safety, as in the case of Centralia, Pennsylvania, where land was taken due to an underground mine fire. Some jurisdictions require that the condemnor make an offer to purchase the subject property before resorting to the use of eminent domain.

== Terminology ==
The term "eminent domain" was taken from the legal treatise De Jure Belli et Pacis, written by the Dutch jurist Hugo Grotius in 1625, which used the term dominium eminens (Latin for supreme lordship) and described the power as follows:

... The property of subjects is under the eminent domain of the state, so that the state or he who acts for it may use and even alienate and destroy such property, not only in the case of extreme necessity, in which even private persons have a right over the property of others, but for ends of public utility, to which ends those who founded civil society must be supposed to have intended that private ends should give way. But it is to be added that when this is done the state is bound to make good the loss to those who lose their property.

Some U.S. states use the term appropriation (New York) or "expropriation" (Louisiana) as synonyms for the exercise of eminent domain powers.

=== Condemnation ===
The term "condemnation" is used to describe the formal act of the exercise of the power of eminent domain to transfer title to the property from its private owner to the government. This use of the word should not be confused with its sense of a declaration that property is uninhabitable due to defects. Condemnation via eminent domain indicates the government is taking ownership of the property or some lesser interest in it, such as an easement, and must pay just compensation for it. After the condemnation action is filed, the amount of just compensation is determined in trial. However, in some cases, the property owner challenges the right to take because the proposed taking is not for "public use", or the condemnor is not legislatively authorized to take the subject property, or has not followed the proper substantive or procedural steps as required by law. Also, in some cases the right to take may be denied by the courts for lack of public necessity for the taking (required by statute), but this is quite rare.

=== Other property ===
The exercise of eminent domain is not limited to real property. Governments may also condemn personal property. Governments can even condemn intangible property such as contract rights, patents, trade secrets, and copyrights. Even the taking by a city of a professional sports team's franchise has been held by the California Supreme Court to be within the purview of the "public use" constitutional limitation, although that taking was later not permitted because it was deemed to violate the interstate commerce clause of the U.S. Constitution.

== History ==
The practice of condemnation was transplanted into the American colonies with the common law. In the early years, unimproved land could be taken without compensation; this practice was accepted because land was so abundant that it could be cheaply replaced. When it came time to draft the United States Constitution, differing views on eminent domain were voiced. Thomas Jefferson favored eliminating all remnants of feudalism, and strove for allodial ownership. James Madison, who wrote the Fifth Amendment to the United States Constitution, had a more moderate view, and struck a compromise that sought to at least protect property rights somewhat by explicitly mandating compensation and using the term "public use" rather than "public purpose," "public interest", or "public benefit".

== Legal background ==
The power of governments to take private real or personal property has always existed in the United States, as an inherent attribute of sovereignty. This power reposes in the legislative branch of the government and may not be exercised unless the legislature has authorized its use by statutes that specify who may use it and for what purposes. The legislature may take private property directly by passing an Act transferring title to the government. The property owner may then seek compensation by suing in the U.S. Court of Federal Claims. The legislature may also delegate the power to private entities like public utilities or railroads, and even to individuals for the purpose of acquiring access to their landlocked land. Its use was limited by the Takings Clause in the Fifth Amendment to the U.S. Constitution in 1791, which reads, "... nor shall private property be taken for public use, without just compensation." The Fifth Amendment did not create the national government's right to use the eminent domain power; it simply limited it to public use.

=== Public use ===
The Fifth Amendment includes the public use requirement under the Takings Clause. Some historians have suggested that these limitations on the taking power were inspired by the need to permit the army to secure mounts, fodder and provisions from local ranchers and the perceived need to assure them compensation for such takings. Similarly, soldiers forcibly sought housing in whatever homes were near their military assignments. To address the latter problem, the Third Amendment was enacted in 1791 as part of the U.S. Constitution's Bill of Rights. It provided that the quartering of soldiers on private property could not take place in peacetime without the landowner's consent. It also required that, in wartime, established law had to be followed in housing troops on private property. Presumably, this would mandate "just compensation," a requirement for the exercise of eminent domain in general per the Fifth Amendment. All U.S. states have legislation specifying eminent domain procedures within their respective territories.

==== Case law ====
The U.S. Supreme Court has consistently deferred to the right of states to make their own determinations of public use. In Clark v. Nash (1905), the Supreme Court acknowledged that different parts of the country have unique circumstances and the definition of public use thus varied with the facts of the case. It ruled a farmer could expand his irrigation ditch across another farmer's land (with compensation), because that farmer was entitled to "the flow of the waters of the said Fort Canyon Creek ... and the uses of the said waters ... [is] a public use." Here, in recognizing the arid climate and geography of Utah, the Court indicated the farmer not adjacent to the river had as much right as the farmer who was, to access the waters. However, until the 14th Amendment was ratified in 1868, the limitations on eminent domain specified in the Fifth Amendment applied only to the federal government and not to the states. That view ended in 1896 when, in the Chicago, Burlington & Quincy Railroad Co. v. City of Chicago case, the court held that the eminent domain provisions of the Fifth Amendment were incorporated in the Due Process Clause of the Fourteenth Amendment and thus were now binding on the states, or in other words, when the states take private property they are required to devote it to a public use and compensate the property owner for his loss. This was the beginning of what is now known as the "selective incorporation" doctrine.

An expansive interpretation of eminent domain was adopted in Berman v. Parker (1954), in which the U.S. Supreme Court reviewed an effort by the District of Columbia to take and raze blighted structures in order to eliminate slums in the Southwest Washington area. After the taking, held the court, the taken and razed land could be transferred to private redevelopers who would construct condominiums, private office buildings and a shopping center. The Supreme Court ruled against the owners of a non-blighted property within the area on the grounds that the project should be judged on its plans as a whole, not on a parcel-by-parcel basis. In Hawaii Housing Authority v. Midkiff (1984), the Supreme Court approved the use of eminent domain to transfer a land lessor's title to its tenants who owned and occupied homes built on the leased land.

The Supreme Court's decision in Kelo v. City of New London, 545 U.S. 469 (2005) went a step further and affirmed the authority of New London, Connecticut, to take non-blighted private property by eminent domain, and then transfer it for a dollar a year to a private developer solely for the purpose of increasing municipal revenues. This 5–4 decision received heavy press coverage and inspired a public outcry criticizing eminent domain powers as too broad. In reaction to Kelo, 47 states strengthened their eminent domain laws, 12 states amended their state constitutions to stop eminent domain from benefitting private parties, and 11 state supreme courts have either rejected Kelo outright or strengthened the protection of private property. The Supreme Courts of Illinois, Michigan (County of Wayne v. Hathcock [2004]), Ohio (Norwood, Ohio v. Horney [2006]), Oklahoma, and South Carolina ruled to disallow such takings under their state constitutions.

The redevelopment in New London, the subject of the Kelo decision, proved to be a failure and over 20 years after the court's decision nothing was built on the taken land despite the expenditure of over $100 million in public funds. The Pfizer corporation, which owned a $300 million research facility in the area, and would have been the primary beneficiary of the additional development, announced in 2009 that it would close its facility, and did so shortly before the expiration of its 10-year tax abatement agreement with the city. The facility was subsequently purchased in 2010 for just $55 million by General Dynamics Electric Boat.

==== Bush executive order ====
On June 23, 2006, the first anniversary of the Kelo decision, President George W. Bush issued Executive Order 13406, which stated in Section I that the federal government must limit its use of taking private property to "public use" with "just compensation" (both of which are phrases used in the U.S. Constitution) for the "purpose of benefiting the general public." The order limits this use by stating that it may not be used "for the purpose of advancing the economic interest of private parties to be given ownership or use of the property taken". However, eminent domain is more often exercised by local and state governments, albeit often with funds obtained from the federal government.

=== Just compensation ===
The Takings Clause does not provide a definition for just compensation, but American courts have held that the preferred measure of "just compensation" is "fair market value," i.e., the price that a willing but unpressured buyer would pay a willing but unpressured seller in a voluntary transaction, with both parties fully informed of the property's good and bad features. The court held in United States v. 50 Acres of Land that this standard does not allow increased compensation for subjective values which might be considered personal to a particular owner.

This approach takes into account the property's highest and best use (i.e., its most profitable use), which is not necessarily its current use or the use mandated by current zoning if there is a reasonable probability of zone change. This must be the maximally productive use, which is physically possible, legally permissible, and financially feasible. The calculation of compensation is also subject to the Scope of the Project Rule, which states that an increase or decrease in the property's market value as a result of the project for which the government is acquiring the land must be disregarded. Any use which is dependent on the government scheme must not be considered.

The term "Severance Damages" is used in partial takings of land. It is the award paid to the land owner for the diminution in value of the part of the property that is not taken and remains in the owner's hands.

=== State law ===
A survey of eminent domain law in the United States conducted by the Texas A&M University School of Law in 2017 found three common legal issues that occur after a state or local government initiates a taking. The first issue condemnees face is whether or not the condemnor must pay the condemnees' attorneys' fees following the condemnation—forty states award attorneys' fees for a variety of reasons. The second issue is what constitutes just compensation. To determine just compensation, twenty-nine states use the Broad Instruction Approach while seventeen states use a Factor Based Approach. The third issue is whether or not the condemnor followed the proper state procedures prior to initiating the condemnation action. The procedures at issue are typically related to negotiation. Most states require some sort of negotiation between the condemnor and the condemnee prior to the filing of the action.

== Tax implications ==
When private property is destroyed, condemned, or disposed of, the owner may receive a payment in property or money in the form of insurance or a condemnation award. If property is compulsorily or involuntarily converted into money (as in eminent domain) the proceeds can be reinvested without payment of capital gains tax provided it is reinvested in property similar or related in service or use to the property so converted, no capital gain shall be recognized.

== Disparate impact ==
Eminent domain has been used to acquire land from African-Americans for urban renewal redevelopments and in other cases to dispossess them and remove them from areas where their presence was not desired by white neighbors, e.g. Bruce's Beach subdivision in Los Angeles, California. Seneca Village was an African-American majority settlement in an area of what became New York City's Central Park. South Glencoe was an African-American neighborhood in Glencoe, Illinois. Central Avenue was an African-American neighborhood in Tampa, Florida.

Eminent domain was used to take property from Japanese-Americans incarcerated by the United States government during World War II. For many, their homes and businesses were then sold while they were incarcerated.

== See also ==
- Lansing v. Smith, a New York Court of Appeals case relevant to eminent domain law.
- Eaton v. Boston, Concord & Montreal Rail Road, a New Hampshire Supreme Court case decided in 1872.
- Romaine Tenney, Vermont farmer whose land was seized to build Interstate 91 and committed suicide in protest
- Diminishment
