= Immigration and Naturalization Service v. Aguirre-Aguirre =

INS v. Aguirre-Aguirre
- Supreme Court of the United States

Argued March 3, 1999 Decided May 3, 1999
- Full case name: Immigration and Naturalization Service v. Aguirre-Aguirre
- Docket no.: 97-1754
- Citations: 526 U.S. 415 (more) 119 S. Ct. 1439; 143 L. Ed. 2d 590; 1999 U.S. LEXIS 3005

Case history
- Prior: Petition for review in the Ninth CIrcuit granted, 121 F.3d 521 (9th Cir. 1997).

Holding
- In ruling that the Board of Immigration Appeals must supplement its weighing test by examining additional factors not considered by the Board, the Ninth Circuit did not accord Chevron deference to the BIA's decision.

Court membership
- Chief Justice William Rehnquist Associate Justices John P. Stevens · Sandra Day O'Connor; Antonin Scalia · Anthony Kennedy; David Souter · Clarence Thomas; Ruth Bader Ginsburg · Stephen Breyer

Case opinion
- Majority: Kennedy, joined by unanimous

Laws applied
- 8 U.S.C. § 1253(h)(1)

Immigration and Naturalization Service v. Aguirre-Aguirre, 526 U.S. 415 (1999), examined a doctrinal question last presented to the U.S. Supreme Court in Immigration and Naturalization Service v. Cardoza-Fonseca. In Aguirre-Aguirre, the Court determined that federal courts had to defer to the Board of Immigration Appeals's interpretation of the Immigration and Nationality Act.

== Facts ==
In 1994, the Immigration and Naturalization Service began deportation proceedings against Juan Anibal Aguirre-Aguirre, who conceded deportability but requested asylum and withholding of deportation. At a hearing before an immigration judge, Aguirre testified he had been politically active in his native Guatemala with the Sindicato Estudiante (Student Union) and with the National Central Union political party. With these groups, Aguirre protested bus fares and the Guatemalan government's failure to investigate the murders and disappearances of other students. These protests included burning buses, breaking windows, and attacking police cars. Aguirre estimated he had set fire to around ten buses. When the passengers on these buses refused to leave, they were stoned, beaten with sticks, or tied up. Aguirre testified that he left Guatemala because of threats he received on account of his having participated in these activities.

The immigration judge granted Aguirre's applications for asylum and withholding of deportation. The INS appealed to the Board of Immigration Appeals (BIA), which reversed the immigration judge, and ordered Aguirre deported. The BIA concluded that even if Aguirre had established the requisite level of persecution, see INS v. Stevic, 467 U.S. 407 (1984), he had committed a "serious nonpolitical crime" and was thus ineligible for withholding of deportation under the Immigration and Nationality Act (INA). Under BIA precedent, the political aspect of the offense must outweigh its common-law character. As the activity Aguirre had participated in on behalf of the Estudeante Syndicado disproportionately affected civilians, the criminal aspect of his activities outweighed their political aspect. Aguirre asked the Ninth Circuit to review the BIA's decision.

From the Ninth Circuit's standpoint, the BIA's decision was deficient in three respects. First, the BIA should have balanced the persecution Aguirre might have suffered if he should return to Guatemala against the offenses he had committed there. Second, it should have considered whether the offenses were grossly disproportionate to their objective. Third, it "should have considered the political necessity and success of Aguirre's methods." As the BIA did not consider these things, the Ninth Circuit found that the BIA's legal analysis was wanting and remanded the case. The INS asked the Supreme Court to review the decision.

== Decision of the Supreme Court ==
The U.S. Attorney General must grant an applicant withholding of removal if he determines that the alien's life or freedom would be threatened in a country on account of race, religion, nationality, membership in a particular social group, or political opinion. 8 U.S.C. § 1253(h)(1). Generally, withholding of deportation is required if it is more likely than not that the alien would be persecuted in his home country on account of one of the protected grounds. However, withholding does not apply if the Attorney General determines that "there are serious reasons for considering that the alien has committed a serious nonpolitical offense outside the United States prior to the arrival of the alien in the United States."

The Ninth Circuit did not disagree that the "serious political offense" exception to mandatory withholding was the proper framework under which to analyze the case. The Ninth Circuit had "confronted questions implicating" the BIA's "construction of the statute which it administers", which meant it should have asked whether or not "the statute is silent or ambiguous with respect to the specific issue" before it. The Court clarified that this threshold inquiry, called the "Chevron deference", applies to questions regarding the BIA's interpretations of parts of the Immigration and Nationality Act, including the "serious political offense" exception. The BIA determined that the alien's criminal acts were not to be judged against the risk that he will be persecuted if he returned to his home country. This conclusion was consistent with the text of the statute, as it "is not obvious that an already-completed crime is somehow rendered less serious by considering the future circumstance that the alien may be subject to persecution if returned to his home country."

The Ninth Circuit ruled that the "political nature of the offenses would be more difficult to accept if they involved acts of an atrocious nature," such as indiscriminate massacre of civilians. But the BIA did not dispute that this, in the abstract, "may be important in applying the serious nonpolitical crime exception." Thus, the Supreme Court decided that "the BIA's determination that 8 U.S.C. § 1253(h)(2)(c) requires no additional balancing of the risk of persecution rests on a fair and permissible reading of the statute."

== Other ==
Bender's Immigration Bulletin, V.4, No. 10 noted on May 15, 1999 that a "Motion to Reopen was pending at the BIA on the issue of interpretation and transcript errors, thus leaving open the possibility that on remand, the Ninth Circuit may in time be reviewing the results of a new hearing with a new set of facts".

== See also ==
- List of United States Supreme Court cases, volume 526
