= Immigration and Naturalization Service v. Cardoza-Fonseca =

INS v. Cardoza-Fonseca
- Supreme Court of the United States

Argued October 7, 1986 Decided March 9, 1987
- Full case name: Immigration and Naturalization Service v. Cardoza-Fonseca
- Citations: 480 U.S. 421 (more) 107 S. Ct. 1207; 94 L. Ed. 2d 434

Case history
- Prior: The Ninth Circuit had remanded the case to the Board of Immigration Appeals to evaluate the asylum claim under a different legal standard, 767 F.2d 1448 (9th Cir. 1985). The Supreme Court granted the INS's petition for certiorari, 475 U.S. 1009 (1986).

Holding
- To establish eligibility for asylum under § 208(a) of the Immigration and Nationality Act, a noncitizen must show only a well-founded fear of persecution, which is something less than a 50% probability of being persecuted if he returns to his home country.

Court membership
- Chief Justice William Rehnquist Associate Justices William J. Brennan Jr. · Byron White; Thurgood Marshall · Harry Blackmun; Lewis F. Powell Jr. · John P. Stevens; Sandra Day O'Connor · Antonin Scalia

Case opinions
- Majority: Stevens, joined by Brennan, Marshall, Blackmun, O'Connor
- Concurrence: Blackmun
- Concurrence: Scalia
- Dissent: Powell, joined by Rehnquist, White

Laws applied
- Section 208(a) of the Immigration and Nationality Act, 8 U.S.C. § 1158(a)

Immigration and Naturalization Service v. Cardoza-Fonseca, 480 U.S. 421 (1987), was a United States Supreme Court case that decided that the standard for withholding of removal, which was set in INS v. Stevic, was too high a standard for applicants for asylum to satisfy. In its place, consistent with the standard set by the United Nations, the Court in held that an applicant for asylum in the United States needs to demonstrate only a "well-founded fear" of persecution, which can be met even if the applicant does not show that he will more likely than not be persecuted if he is returned to his home country.

== Facts ==
Cardoza-Fonseca entered the United States in 1979 as a visitor from Nicaragua. She overstayed her US visa, and the INS began proceedings to deport her. She admitted that she was in the US illegally but applied for two forms of relief in the deportation hearings: asylum and withholding of deportation. Under US law, the INS had the discretion to grant asylum to a noncitizen eligible for that relief, but must withhold deportation if the noncitizen is eligible for that kind of relief.

To support her request for asylum, Cardoza said that her brother had been tortured by the Sandinistas because of his political activities in Nicaragua. They believed that the Sandinistas knew that they had fled Nicaragua together and that even though Cardoza had not been politically active herself, she feared that she would be interrogated about her brother's whereabouts and activities if she returned to Nicaragua. She also mentioned that her own political opposition to the Sandinistas would be brought to the attention of the government. For that reason, Cardoza feared that she would be tortured if she returned to Nicaragua.

An immigration judge denied her requests for asylum and withholding of deportation and believed that the same legal standard applied to both claims. The judge found that Cardoza had not established a clear probability of persecution and thus was not entitled to either asylum or withholding of deportation. The Board of Immigration Appeals (BIA) agreed with those conclusions.

Cardoza appealed only the denial of her claim for asylum to the Ninth Circuit. The Ninth Circuit ruled that the BIA had incorrectly applied the same standard to Cardoza's claims for both asylum and withholding of deportation since the statutes giving the Attorney General authority to grant those forms of relief to noncitizens were phrased differently. It held that the standard for asylum was lower than that for withholding of deportation and that asylum required only a showing of a "well-founded fear" of persecution, instead of a "clear probability."

The INS successfully asked the Supreme Court to hear the case.

== Majority opinion ==
A person is eligible for the discretionary relief of asylum if he is a refugee by being "unable or unwilling to return to, and is unwilling or unable to avail themselves of the protection of, [their home] country because of persecution or a well-founded fear of persecution on account of race, religion, nationality, membership in a particular social group, or political opinion." In contrast, a person is eligible for the mandatory relief of withholding deportation by demonstrating a "clear probability of persecution" if he is returned to his country. Because statutes governing the different forms of relief describe the showing the noncitizen must make in different terms, the Court reasoned that they are different.

Furthermore, a "well-founded fear" is different and can be lower than, a "clear probability" of persecution.

Three aspects of the legislative history of Congress's definition of asylum bolstered the Court's conclusion. Firstly, before 1980 Congress added the words "well-founded" to the definition of "asylum" to conform the US definition to the United Nations Protocol regarding refugees. Next, the 1980 Refugee Act pushed the goal of conforming US law with the UN Protocol Relating to the Status of Refugees. Indeed, the Refugee Act's definition of a "refugee" was virtually identical to the protocol's, which required contracting nations to establish a category of immigrants for whom discretionary grants of asylum were available, which the 1980 act did precisely. Then, Congress expressly rejected a proposal by the Senate to make the standards for eligibility for asylum and withholding of deportation the same.

Then, the INS argued it would be anomalous to have a lower standard for asylum that afforded greater benefits to a noncitizen than withholding deportation. (Asylum allows a person to become a lawful permanent resident of the United States, but withholding deportation is subject to quotas from certain countries and conditional on deportation to a hospitable third country not being available.) That argument overlooked the fact that asylum is "discretionary" on the part of the Attorney General, but withholding of deportation is "mandatory."

Finally, the INS asked the Court to make the standards the same because the BIA had interpreted them to be the same, and the Court's precedent in Chevron U.S.A., Inc. v. Natural Resources Defense Council, Inc., 467 U.S. 837 (1984), required it to defer to an agency's own interpretation of a pertinent statute. The question of whether Congress had intended the standards to be the same was one for the courts, even under Chevron. The Court was not deciding what a "well-founded fear" would mean but simply that it was a lower standard than a "clear probability" of persecution.

Justice Harry Blackmun commended the Courts of Appeals for its diligent work in recognizing the distinction between the two standards: "The efforts of these courts stand in stark contrast to—but, it is sad to say, alone cannot make up for—the years of seemingly purposeful blindness by the INS, which only now begins its task of developing the standard entrusted to its care."

Justice Antonin Scalia stressed that he concurred in the judgment of the Court merely because he believed that it had reached the right result. He chastised the Court for examining legislative history: "Judges interpret laws rather than reconstruct legislators' intentions. Where the language of those laws is clear, we are not free to replace it with an unenacted legislative intent." He also questioned whether the Court's discussion of Chevron deference was correct or appropriate.

== Dissenting opinion ==
Writing for the three dissenting Justices, Justice Lewis F. Powell, Jr. said he would reverse the decision of the Ninth Circuit because the BIA's interpretation of the definition of "refugee" was reasonable. He pointed out that the BIA's interpretation of both "well-founded fear" and "clear probability of persecution" were not mathematical in nature but were instead qualitative determinations. The heart of the standard articulated by the BIA was its "empirical conclusion, based on its experience in adjudicating asylum applications, that if the facts establish such a basis for a noncitizen's fear, it rarely will make a difference whether the judge asks if persecution is 'likely' to occur or 'more likely than not' to occur. If the noncitizen can establish such a basis, he normally will be eligible for relief under either standard."

Next, Justice Powell observed that both a "well-founded fear" and a "clear probability" had an objective component. The question in this case, whether those objective components are materially different, and if so, how, "is just the type of expert judgment—formed by the entity to whom Congress has committed the question—to which we should defer." Persecution is an individualized activity, and the BIA had undertaken of evaluate the probability of persecution qualitatively. There was no reason to suppose that the BIA's formulation of the standard was inconsistent with Congress's definition of the statute, particularly in light of what Powell considered an ambiguous legislative history.

Also, Powell asserted the BIA had actually applied the lower standard the Court had identified to the evidence presented in this case. Cardoza's other family members, after all, were still in Nicaragua and presumably subject to the persecution that she and her brother claimed to fear. Cardoza admitted that she had not taken any action against the Nicaraguan government. In fact, she said that she was not politically active and had never been singled out for persecution by the government. The BIA accordingly held that Cardoza was not entitled to relief under any standard, including the "good reason" standard that was ultimately adopted by the Ninth Circuit and was described by Powell described as the "least burdensome" standard available to the BIA. Accordingly, Powell felt that the BIA had applied the correct legal standard to Cardoza's claim for asylum.

== See also ==
- List of United States Supreme Court cases, volume 480
