= Particularly serious crime =

American legal term

Particularly serious crime in the Immigration and Nationality Act (INA) of the United States is a predecessor of the current aggravated felony. The term "particularly serious crime" was coined for the first time when the U.S. Congress enacted the Refugee Act in 1980.

Aliens who have been convicted of particularly serious crimes (and found by the U.S. Attorney General to be dangers to the community of the United States) are statutorily precluded from receiving asylum or a grant of withholding of removal under 8 U.S.C. § 1231(b)(3)(B).
