= Boika v. Holder =

- Court: United States Court of Appeals for the Seventh Circuit
- Full case name: Tatsiana BOIKA..., Petitioners v. Eric H. HOLDER, Jr, Attorney General of the United States, Respondent
- Decided: August 16, 2013
- Citation: 727 F.3d 735

Case history
- Prior actions: Board of Immigration Appeals affirmed Immigration Judge's denial of asylum. Seventh Circuit denied petition for review in Boika v. Holder, 418 Fed.Appx. 559 (7th Cir. 2011) WL 2199259. The Board denied motion to reopen based on material change in conditions in home country.

Court membership
- Judges sitting: David F. Hamilton, Kenneth Francis Ripple, and Ann Claire Williams

Case opinions
- The denial of the motion to reopen removal proceeding based on change in country decisions required remand to the Board of Immigration Appeals for its failure to address potentially meritorious evidence. The Board abused its discretion by requiring the alien to show that she would have been personally targeted upon removal.

Boika v. Holder, 727 F.3d 735 (7th Cir. 2013), is a precedent decision by the United States Court of Appeals for the Seventh Circuit addressing an alien's motion to reopen after the Board of Immigration Appeals (BIA) had denied her applications for asylum, withholding of removal, and for relief under the convention against torture. Judge David F. Hamilton wrote the opinion for the three-judge panel which granted the petition for review and remanded the case to the BIA for further proceedings.

== Facts ==
The case concerned Tatsiana Boika, a citizen of Belarus, who entered the United States legally in 2006 but subsequently overstayed her period of authorized stay. Boika was placed in removal proceedings. In proceedings, she conceded removability but applied for asylum under 8 U.S.C. § 1159, for withholding of removal under 8 U.S.C. § 1231(b)(3), and for relief under the convention against torture. Boika's request for relief was based on past persecution for her political involvement in Belarus. Boika's husband made parallel claims that were derivative to her claims.

The Immigration Judge hearing the case denied her application for asylum on the ground of inconsistencies in her testimony and corroborating documents. The denial was affirmed by the BIA, and the Seventh Circuit denied Boika's petition for review.

Boika's moved to reopen proceedings under 8 U.S.C. § 1229a(c)(7)(C)(ii) was based on allegations of materially changed conditions in Belarus. Specifically, she cited the Belarusian government's crackdown on political opposition and related human rights abuses following the reelection of President Alexander Lukashenko in 2010. The BIA denied Boika's motion to reopen on finding that the evidence that she presented did not represent a "material change of conditions" in Belarus and that the evidence did not show a prima facie claim for eligibility for asylum. The BIA denial devoted a single, conclusory sentence to explaining why it found that the evidence Boika submitted was insufficient to merit reopening proceedings.

== Holding ==
In a decision by Judge David F. Hamilton, the Seventh Circuit granted Boika's appeal from the denial of her motion to reopen proceedings under 8 U.S.C. § 1229a(c)(7)(C)(ii) and remanded the case to the BIA for further proceedings consistent with the Seventh Circuit decision.

In the first point of the decision, the Seventh Circuit held that the BIA had failed to address "potentially meritorious evidence" submitted by Boika to show materially changed conditions in Belarus. The decision noted:

The Board's terse explanation said only that 'the Evidence proffered with the respondents' present motion does not reflect the changed country conditions in Belarus that materially affect their eligibility for asylum, withholding of removal, and protection under the Convention Against Torture.

Quoting from its decision in Kebe v. Gonzales, 473 F.3d 855, 857 (7th Cir. 2007), the decision stated:

We have frequently remanded cases when the BIA's or the IJ's failure to discuss potentially meritorious arguments or evidence calls into question whether it adequately considered these arguments.

The Seventh Circuit took no position on whether the evidence that Boika submitted warranted reopening. Rather, it saw it necessary to remand the case to the BIA because the BIA "did not appropriately explain why it rejected her evidence of changed country conditions."

The BIA, in denying Boika's motion to reopen, had held that Boika had not established a prima facie case for asylum eligibility because the evidence of changed country conditions did not demonstrate that the Belarusian government was personally interested in Boika. However, the Seventh Circuit explained, the BIA's rationale was "not complete or correct" because 8 U.S.C. 1208.13(b)(2)(iii) required only that Boika show "a well-founded fear of persecution upon return to Belarus by showing that she belongs to a group that is currently being persecuted." Accordingly, the Seventh Circuit found that the BIA had abused its discretion by requiring Boika to show that she would have been personally targeted upon returning to Belarus.

Finally, the Seventh Circuit rejected the government's argument that the prior adverse credibility finding rendered the BIA's lack of explanation harmless because "it would have been an abuse of discretion for the Board to rely only on the prior adverse credibility finding to discredit Boika's new evidence without a proper evidentiary hearing." The Seventh Circuit affirmed the principle that an applicant may be granted reopening by demonstrating changed circumstances even if there was a prior adverse credibility finding.

== Full panel and attorneys ==
The decision by Judge David F. Hamilton was joined by Judges Kenneth Francis Ripple and Ann Claire Williams.

Alexander J. Segal Esq. represented the plaintiff. Colin J. Tucker represented the Department of Justice.
