= Public use =

US legal requirement on property seized by eminent domain

Public use is a legal requirement under the Takings Clause ("nor shall private property be taken for public use without just compensation") of the Fifth Amendment of the U.S. Constitution, that owners of property seized by eminent domain for "public use" be paid "just compensation."

The distinction between public use and public purpose has created a doctrinally confusing and highly controversial subset of public use doctrine. This controversy was renewed after the Supreme Court's decision in Kelo v. City of New London (2005). In that decision, the Court upheld the precedent regarding economic development takings set forth in Hawaii Housing Authority v. Midkiff and Berman v. Parker, and permitted, in a 5–4 decision, the taking of private property that was to be transferred to a private developer. In United States v. Gettysburg Electric Ry. Co., 160 U.S. 668 (1896), the Supreme Court ruled in 1896 that seizing the railway for Gettysburg Battlefield historic preservation "seems" to be "a public use".

Takings that are not "for public use" are not directly covered by the doctrine, however such a taking will likely violate due process rights under the Fourteenth Amendment or other applicable law.

== See also ==
- Berman v. Parker (1954)
- Hawaii Housing Authority v. Midkiff (1985) in which the Supreme Court held that the eminent domain taking of a landlord's land in order to transfer it to lessee-homeowners residing on it in homes owned by them, satisfied the "public use" constitutional requirement.
- Kelo v. City of New London (2005)
- Eminent Domain, A Truly Tri-Partisan Issue
