= Mabry v. Johnson =

- Supreme Court of the United States

Decided June 11, 1984
- Full case name: Mabry v. Johnson
- Citations: 467 U.S. 504 (more)

Holding
- Accepting a first plea bargain that is later rescinded does not create a right to have that first bargain specifically enforced when the criminal defendant accepts a second, less-beneficial plea bargain.

Court membership
- Chief Justice Warren E. Burger Associate Justices William J. Brennan Jr. · Byron White; Thurgood Marshall · Harry Blackmun; Lewis F. Powell Jr. · William Rehnquist; John P. Stevens · Sandra Day O'Connor

Case opinion
- Majority: Stevens, joined by unanimous

Mabry v. Johnson, 467 U.S. 504 (1984), was a United States Supreme Court case in which the court held that accepting a first plea bargain that is later rescinded does not create a right to have that first bargain specifically enforced when the criminal defendant accepts a second, less-beneficial plea bargain.

== Background ==
After Johnson was convicted in an Arkansas state court on charges of burglary, assault, and murder, the Arkansas Supreme Court set aside the murder conviction, and plea negotiations ensued. A deputy prosecutor proposed to Johnson's attorney that, in exchange for a guilty plea to a charge of accessory after a felony murder, the prosecutor would recommend a 21-year sentence to be served concurrently with the concurrent burglary and assault sentences. However, when defense counsel called the prosecutor three days later and communicated respondent's acceptance of the offer, the prosecutor told counsel that a mistake had been made, and withdrew the offer.

The prosecutor proposed instead that, in exchange for a guilty plea, he would recommend a 21-year sentence to be served consecutively to the other sentences. Respondent rejected the new offer, but after a mistrial was declared, he ultimately accepted the prosecutor's second offer, and the trial judge imposed a 21-year sentence to be served consecutively to the previous sentences.

After exhausting state remedies, Johnson sought habeas corpus relief in a federal district court with respect to his guilty plea. The court dismissed the petition, holding that respondent had understood the consequences of his guilty plea, that he had received effective assistance of counsel, and that, because it was not established that he had detrimentally relied on the prosecutor's first-proposed plea agreement, Johnson had no right to enforce it. However, the Eighth Circuit Court of Appeals reversed, holding that "fairness" precluded the prosecution's withdrawal of the plea proposal once accepted by respondent.

== Opinion of the court ==
The Supreme Court issued an opinion on June 11, 1984.
