= United States v. Gouveia =

- Supreme Court of the United States

Argued March 20, 1984 Decided May 29, 1984
- Full case name: United States v. William Gouveia, et al.
- Citations: 467 U.S. 180 (more) 104 S. Ct. 2292; 81 L. Ed. 2d 146; 1984 U.S. LEXIS 91; 52 U.S.L.W. 4659

Case history
- Prior: Cert. to the United States Court of Appeals for the Ninth Circuit

Holding
- Respondents were not constitutionally entitled to the appointment of counsel while they were in administrative segregation and before any adversary judicial proceedings had been initiated against them.

Court membership
- Chief Justice Warren E. Burger Associate Justices William J. Brennan Jr. · Byron White; Thurgood Marshall · Harry Blackmun; Lewis F. Powell Jr. · William Rehnquist; John P. Stevens · Sandra Day O'Connor

Case opinions
- Majority: Rehnquist, joined by Burger, White, Blackmun, Powell, O'Connor
- Concurrence: Stevens, joined by Brennan
- Dissent: Marshall

Laws applied
- U.S. Const. amend. VI

United States v. Gouveia, 467 U.S. 180 (1984), was a case in which the United States Supreme Court held that prisoners in administrative segregation pending the investigation of crimes committed within the prison had no Sixth Amendment entitlement to counsel prior to the initiation of adversary judicial proceedings against them. In an opinion written by Justice William Rehnquist, the Court stated that the right to counsel may extend to "'critical' pretrial proceedings" that are adversarial in nature, but the Sixth Amendment right to counsel "attaches at the initiation of adversary judicial criminal proceedings".

== See also ==
- List of United States Supreme Court cases
- Lists of United States Supreme Court cases by volume
- List of United States Supreme Court cases, volume 467
- List of United States Supreme Court cases by the Roberts Court
