= Bernal v. Fainter =

- Supreme Court of the United States

Argued March 28, 1984 Decided May 30, 1984
- Full case name: Bernal v. Fainter, Secretary of State of Texas, et al.
- Citations: 467 U.S. 216 (more) 104 S. Ct. 2312; 81 L. Ed. 2d 175; 1984 U.S. LEXIS 93; 52 U.S.L.W. 4669

Case history
- Prior: 710 F.2d 190 (5th Cir. 1983)

Holding
- The Texas statute requiring that a notary public be a United States citizen violates the Equal Protection Clause of the Fourteenth Amendment.

Court membership
- Chief Justice Warren E. Burger Associate Justices William J. Brennan Jr. · Byron White; Thurgood Marshall · Harry Blackmun; Lewis F. Powell Jr. · William Rehnquist; John P. Stevens · Sandra Day O'Connor

Case opinions
- Majority: Marshall, joined by Burger, Brennan, White, Blackmun, Powell, Stevens, O'Connor
- Dissent: Rehnquist

Laws applied
- U.S. Const. amend. XIV

Bernal v. Fainter, 467 U.S. 216 (1984), is a case in which the Supreme Court of the United States ruled that the Equal Protection Clause prohibited the state of Texas from barring noncitizens from applying for commission as a notary public.

== Background ==
A native of Mexico applied to be a notary public in Texas. Citing a Texas law that required notaries public to be citizens of the United States, Texas' Secretary of State denied the application. After losing an administrative appeal, the applicant filed a lawsuit in federal court. The trial court ruled in favor of the applicant and found that under the Equal Protection Clause of the Fourteenth Amendment to the United States Constitution, Texas' citizenship requirement did not pass either strict scrutiny or rational basis review. The United States Court of Appeals for the Fifth Circuit reversed, holding that the rational basis test was the proper standard of review and that under this standard, the citizenship requirement "bears a rational relationship to the state's interest in the proper and orderly handling of a countless variety of legal documents of importance to the state."

== Opinion of the Court ==
Citing Graham v. Richardson, the Supreme Court recognized that legal aliens are a suspect class, and therefore any law applying to legal aliens as a class is subject to strict scrutiny. The Court also recognized a "political function" exception that subjects alienage classification laws to a lower standard of review for "positions intimately related to the process of democratic self-governance." However, the Court held that since the requirements of being a notary are essentially ministerial (that is, without judgment or discretion, either the person fits the statutory requirement to have a document authenticated or they do not), and the only real requirement of a notary was to follow the law, being a notary does not have any special character of citizenship that would require one to necessarily be a citizen. The Court noted that this is unlike the role played by other individuals in who work in judicial systems, such as judges or police officer, where a locality may require police officers to be citizens because they act on behalf of the state and have considerable discretion in how the law is enforced. Consequently, the Supreme Court struck down the Texas law that required a notary to be a citizen. The Court also noted in dictum that notary commissions are issued by the Texas Secretary of State, who is not required to be a citizen despite holding the "highest appointive position" in Texas.

=== Dissenting opinion ===
Justice William Rehnquist wrote a one-sentence dissenting opinion stating: "I dissent for the reasons stated in my dissenting opinion in Sugarman v. Dougall." In Sugarman, Justice Rehnquist argued that alienage is not a suspect classification.

== See also ==
- Torcaso v. Watkins (1961): religious test to be a notary found unconstitutional
- List of United States Supreme Court cases, volume 467
