= New York v. Quarles =

- Supreme Court of the United States

Argued January 18, 1984 Decided June 12, 1984
- Full case name: People of New York v. Benjamin Quarles
- Citations: 467 U.S. 649 (more) 104 S. Ct. 2626; 81 L. Ed. 2d 550

Case history
- Prior: Certiorari to the Court of Appeals of New York

Holding
- Concern for public safety must be paramount to adherence to the literal language of the prophylactic rules enunciated in Miranda.

Court membership
- Chief Justice Warren E. Burger Associate Justices William J. Brennan Jr. · Byron White; Thurgood Marshall · Harry Blackmun; Lewis F. Powell Jr. · William Rehnquist; John P. Stevens · Sandra Day O'Connor

Case opinions
- Majority: Rehnquist, joined by Burger, White, Blackmun, Powell
- Concur/dissent: O'Connor
- Dissent: Marshall, joined by Brennan, Stevens

Laws applied
- U.S. Const. amend. V

New York v. Quarles, 467 U.S. 649 (1984), was a decision by the United States Supreme Court regarding the public safety exception to the normal Fifth Amendment requirements of the Miranda warning.

== Background ==
The Supreme Court considered the admissibility of a statement elicited by a police officer who apprehended a rape suspect who was thought to be carrying a firearm. The arrest took place in an open but empty grocery store. When the officer arrested the suspect, he found an empty shoulder holster, handcuffed the suspect, and asked him where the gun was. The suspect nodded in the direction of the gun (which was near some empty cartons) and said, "The gun is over there".

The suspect was not prosecuted for rape, but was charged with criminal possession of a weapon. However, he argued that his statement ("The gun is over there") was inadmissible in evidence because he had not first been given the Miranda warning. Since the gun was found as a direct result of the statement, he argued that the presence of the gun was also inadmissible, making it impossible to convict him.

== Judgment ==
In a 5–4 decision, the Supreme Court found that the jurisprudential rule of Miranda must yield in "a situation where concern for public safety must be paramount to adherence to the literal language of the prophylactic rules enunciated in Miranda". The rule of Miranda is not, therefore, absolute and can be a bit more elastic in cases of public safety. Under this exception, to be admissible in the government's direct case at a trial, the questioning must not be "actually compelled by police conduct which overcame his will to resist," and must be focused and limited, involving a situation "in which police officers ask questions reasonably prompted by a concern for the public safety."

The suspect's unadvised statement was therefore admissible in evidence because "[i]n a kaleidoscopic situation such as the one confronting these officers, where spontaneity rather than adherence to a police manual is necessarily the order of the day, the application of the exception we recognize today should not be made to depend on post hoc findings at a suppression hearing concerning the subjective motivation of the police officer".

== Dissent ==
Justice Marshall, joined by Justices Brennan and Stevens, rejected the idea of a public safety exception:

It would strain credulity to contend that Officer Kraft's questioning of respondent Quarles was not coercive. In the middle of the night and in the back of an empty supermarket, Quarles was surrounded by four armed police officers. His hands were handcuffed behind his back. The first words out of the mouth of the arresting officer were: "Where is the gun?" [...] Officer Kraft's abrupt and pointed question pressured Quarles in precisely the way that the Miranda Court feared the custodial interrogations would coerce self-incriminating testimony. [...]

Until today, this Court could truthfully state that the Fifth Amendment is given "broad scope" "[w]here there has been genuine compulsion of testimony." Michigan v. Tucker, 417 U. S. 433, 417 U. S. 440 (1974). Coerced confessions were simply inadmissible in criminal prosecutions. The "public safety" exception departs from this principle by expressly inviting police officers to coerce defendants into making incriminating statements, and then permitting prosecutors to introduce those statements at trial. Though the majority's opinion is cloaked in the beguiling language of utilitarianism, the Court has sanctioned sub silentio criminal prosecutions based on compelled self-incriminating statements. I find this result in direct conflict with the Fifth Amendment's dictate that "[n]o person . . . shall be compelled in any criminal case to be a witness against himself."

Furthermore, even if a public safety exception was allowed, he believed it would have been inapplicable in this particular case:

[T]here was no evidence that the interrogation was prompted by the arresting officers' concern for the public's safety. [...] [N]o customers or employees were wandering about the store in danger of coming across Quarles' discarded weapon. Although the supermarket was open to the public, Quarles' arrest took place during the middle of the night, when the store was apparently deserted except for the clerks at the check-out counter. The police could easily have cordoned off the store and searched for the missing gun. Had they done so, they would have found the gun forthwith.

Justice O'Connor filed a separate opinion, also rejecting the idea of a public safety exception, but arguing that the presence of the gun itself should still be admissible evidence.
