= Brooks Brothers riot =

2000 U.S. political demonstration

- Duration: November 22, 2000
- Location: Miami-Dade County, Florida
- Motive: Disrupt recount of votes in the 2000 United States presidential election
- Target: Officials canvassing the vote
- Outcome: Election of George W. Bush

The Brooks Brothers riot was a demonstration led by Republican staffers at a meeting of election canvassers in Miami-Dade County, Florida, United States, on November 22, 2000, during a recount of votes made during the 2000 United States presidential election, with the goal of shutting down the recount. After demonstrations and acts of violence, local officials shut down the recount early.

The name referenced the protesters' corporate attire, described by Paul Gigot in an editorial for The Wall Street Journal as "50-year-old white lawyers with cell phones and Hermès ties", differentiating them from local citizens concerned about vote counting. Many of the demonstrators were Republican staffers. Both Roger Stone and Brad Blakeman take credit for managing the riot from a command post, although their accounts contradict each other. Republican New York representative John E. Sweeney gave the signal that started the riot, telling an aide to "shut it down".

== Background ==
In the 2000 United States presidential election between candidates George W. Bush and Al Gore, in the state of Florida, George W. Bush achieved an election night majority by 1,784 votes, a very close margin. Due to the closeness of the race, and irregularities such as hanging chads, the Gore campaign successfully advocated for a recount of certain ballots. Miami-Dade County was one of the counties where ballots were recounted.

The Miami-Dade County Democratic Party chairman suspected that thousands of ballots in this county might have been affected by a voting machine glitch. He suspected that these ballots, after re-tallying, would help candidate Al Gore. Miami-Dade County official canvassers, in order to meet a court-ordered deadline, decided to limit the county's recount to the 10,750 ballots that their tabulation machines had been unable to tally. They moved the counting process to a smaller room, closer to the ballot-scanning equipment, to speed up the process, at a distance from the media. Republican officials objected to this change.

== Demonstration ==
Hundreds of people, including many Republican staffers, descended upon South Florida to protest the state's recounts. The demonstration was organized by these operatives, sometimes referred to as the "Brooks Brothers Brigade", to oppose the recount of ballots during the Florida election recount. The official canvassers, to speed up the process and meet their deadline, moved the counting process into a new room, and members of the media were restricted to a distance of 25 feet away.

Republicans objected to this change of plans. John E. Sweeney of New York, nicknamed "Congressman Kick-Ass" by President Bush for his work in Florida, set the incident in motion by telling an aide to 'stop them' and to "Shut it down." The demonstration turned violent and, according to The New York Times, "several people were trampled, punched or kicked when protesters tried to rush the doors outside the office of the Miami-Dade supervisor of elections. Sheriff's deputies restored order." Democratic National Committee aide Luis Rosero reported that the rioters kicked and punched him outside of Leahy's office. Within two hours after the event, the canvassing board unanimously voted to shut down the count, in part due to perceptions that the process was not open or fair, and in part because the court-mandated deadline had become impossible to meet, due to the interference.

Sweeney defended his actions, arguing that his aim was not to stop the hand recount, but to restore the process to public view. Other Bush supporters acknowledged they hoped to end the recount. "We were trying to stop the recount; Bush had already won," said Evilio Cepero, a reporter for WAQI, an influential Spanish talk radio station in Miami. "We were urging people to come downtown and support and protest this injustice." A Republican lawyer commented, "People were pounding on the doors, but they had an absolute right to get in." The protest interfered with attendance by official observers and hindered access by members of the press. In a radio interview in Albany on November 28, Sweeney said, "What I essentially told my people is, 'You've got to stop them'." "Whether I said, 'You've got to shut it down' or 'stop them,' I frankly don't quite recall."

Several of the protestors were identified as Republican congressional staffers. A number of the demonstrators later took jobs in the incoming Bush administration.

== Participants ==
A partial list:

- Brad Blakeman, Republican strategist.
- Chuck Royal, legislative assistant to Sen. Jim DeMint (R-S.C.)
- Duane Gibson, a Don Young aide on the House Resources Committee who worked for Ted Stevens, then became a lobbyist associated with Jack Abramoff
- Garry Malphrus, who became deputy director of the White House Domestic Policy Council during the Bush administration
- Joel Kaplan, who became a policy advisor in the Bush administration, and later President of Global Public Policy for Meta Platforms
- Kevin Smith, a former GOP House aide
- Layna McConkey Peltier, a former Senate and House aide
- Marjorie Strayer, an aide to New Mexico's Republican congresswoman, Heather Wilson.
- Matt Schlapp, a former Rep. Todd Tiahrt (R-KS) House aide, becoming the White House political director during the Bush administration, and director of the American Conservative Union in 2014.
- Roger Morse, a former House aide who became a lobbyist
- Roger Stone, a self-described "GOP Hitman" and former member of Nixon's Committee for the Re-Election of the President
- Rory Cooper, a former staffer for the National Republican Congressional Committee and later the White House Homeland Security Council
- Steven Brophy, a former GOP Senate aide to Senators Fred Thompson, Bill Frist, and in 2003, Representative Marsha Blackburn, and later became V.P. at Dollar General
- Tom Pyle, a former Tom DeLay (R-Tex.) staffer who later worked for Koch Industries

== Legacy ==
According to conversations leaked to The Washington Post by journalist and liberal activist Sarah Ashton-Cirillo—who had worked for the Nevada Republican Party leading up to and through the November 2020 election under an assumed hard-right, Trumpist persona—a vice president at consultancy McShane LLC claimed that Republican congressman Paul Gosar was planning a "Brooks Brothers Riot" in Arizona to disrupt the counting of votes in the 2020 United States presidential election, and told Ashton-Cirillo to "get the Proud Boys out" for a similar event in Clark County, Nevada. Gosar denies having discussed any protests with the McShane vice president.

== See also ==
- 2002 New Hampshire Senate election phone jamming scandal
- Ballot Security Task Force, a controversial group founded in 1981 by the Republican National Committee and accused of intimidating voters and discouraging voter turnout among likely Democratic voters in New Jersey.
- Bush v. Gore, the 2000 Supreme Court decision deciding the fate of the 2000 United States presidential election.
- Democratic backsliding in the United States
- January 6 United States Capitol attack – 2021 attack to stop election certification
- Republican efforts to restrict voting following the 2020 presidential election
