= Withholding of removal =

Immigration status in United States

Withholding of removal (formerly withholding of deportation) is a legal status under US immigration law, 8 USC 1231(b)(3)(A), that an undocumented immigrant can get that prevents the immigrant from being deported by the US to a country when the U.S. Attorney General decides the immigrant's life or freedom will be threatened in that country due to the immigrant's race, religion, nationality, political opinion or membership in a particular social group. The status is similar to asylum but is harder to get and much less frequent.

Withholding of removal differs from asylum in that an immigrant can apply for withholding of removal more than one year after they enter the US and they can apply if they have been deported before. The applicant, however, has to show that there is a reasonable fear (i.e., more than 50% probability) that they will be harmed if sent back to their home country. For asylum, the applicant only has to show that there is a credible fear (i.e., more than 10%). The applicant that attains withholding of removal status is not eligible for permanent residency in the US but can get a work permit. The applicant can only apply for themselves. They cannot apply for their immediate family as they can with asylum. The applicant can still be deported to another country, just not the country specified in the withholding of removal order.

An applicant can be denied withholding of removal if:

- they were convicted of a particularly serious crime in the US or abroad;
- they themselves were involved in the persecution of another group based on race, religion etc.;
- they pose a danger to the United States; or
- they had firmly resettled in another country before entering the US.

In FY 2019, 3,306 immigrants were able to show they had a reasonable fear of being harmed if returned to their home country, and entered the process to obtain withholding of removal status. By comparison, 75,252 immigrants were able to show the credible fear required for asylum.

== Notable persons granted withholding of removal ==
- Nada Nadim Prouty
- Kilmar Abrego Garcia

== Case law ==
- Boika v. Holder
- Immigration and Naturalization Service v. Stevic
- Immigration and Naturalization Service v. Cardoza-Fonseca
- Immigration and Naturalization Service v. Aguirre-Aguirre
- Immigration and Naturalization Service v. Abudu
