= Garry Malphrus =

American judge

Garry D. Malphrus is the Chief Appellate Immigration Judge with the Board of Immigration Appeals in the US. He was elevated to the Board on May 30, 2008. From June 2005 until his appointment to the board, he was an immigration judge in Arlington, Virginia.

Malphrus appointment as an immigration judge by Alberto Gonzales was highly controversial. Many alleged that the appointment was a result of Malphrus' political ties to the Bush administration. Prior to becoming an immigration judge, from 2001 to 2004, Judge Malphrus served as associate director of the White House Domestic Policy Council. He was also reported to have been a member of the so-called Brooks Brothers riot, the Republican orchestrated protests during the 2000 presidential election Florida recount.

Since becoming the Chief Appellate Immigration Judge in 2025, the Board has issued 35 precedential decisions (as of August 28, 2025). All 35 have ruled in favor of Immigration and Customs Enforcement. Not a single ruling has been in favor of the non-citizen.

From 1997 until 2001, Malphrus served as Chief Counsel to the Senate Subcommittee on Criminal Justice Oversight under Senator Strom Thurmond.

On October 31, 2025, Chief Judge Malphrus, writing for the BIA, held that it is an asylum applicant's burden to establish exceptions to an Asylum Cooperative Agreement (ACA) if the DHS claims that it bars applicants from asylum eligibility. He further held that it is entirely the decision of the DHS and Attorney General to determine whether or not the given country would allow the applicant "access to a full and fair procedure" to apply for asylum in the third country. In doing so, he and the BIA have eliminated the ability to qualify for asylum under Trump's plethora of ACA agreements because he barred judges from considering whether or not the country designated in such an ACA would actually consider accepting the applicant.
