= Particular social group =

Category that may be used to claim refugee status according to the UN

Particular social group (PSG) is one of five categories that may be used to claim refugee status according to two key United Nations documents: the 1951 Convention relating to the Status of Refugees and the 1967 Protocol relating to the Status of Refugees. The other four categories are race, religion, nationality, and political opinion. As the most ambiguous and open-ended of the categories, the PSG category has been the subject of considerable debate and controversy in refugee law. Note that just as with the other four categories, membership in a PSG is not sufficient grounds for being granted refugee status. Rather, to be granted refugee status, one must both demonstrate membership in one of the five categories (race, religion, nationality, particular political opinion, and particular social group) and a nexus between that membership and persecution one is facing or risks facing.

PSG determination is part of the general refugee determination process in most countries that are signatories to the 1951 Convention. In particular, these decisions are made by the immigration bureaucracies, immigration courts, and the general courts (to which immigration decisions may need to be appealed). Past decisions create guidelines and precedents for future decisions in the same country. In general, decisions in one country do not create precedents for decisions in other countries, but there is some influence through the influence on periodically updated UNHCR guidelines and through lawyers' use of these cases. Two particularly seminal decisions influencing PSG determination worldwide have been Matter of Acosta (1985, United States), and Ward (1993, Canada).

Examples of PSGs identified in various countries include women (and various subsets thereof), homosexuals and others with non-mainstream sexual orientations, specific families, and the poor.

== United Nations documents ==
In 2002, the United Nations High Commission for Refugees (UNHCR) published updated guidance for the interpretation of the PSG category.

=== Broad guidelines ===
- The PSG category is not meant to be used as a catch-all, and a PSG cannot be defined exclusively based on persecution. In other words, just the fact that a person is persecuted does not make the person a member of a PSG.
- There is no closed list of PSGs. Rather, membership in a PSG should evolve over time, based on the diverse and changing nature of different groups and evolving international human rights norms.
- The Convention grounds are not mutually exclusive. A person may claim refugee status based on membership in a PSG as well as the other grounds such as religion or political opinion, if they apply.

=== Two approaches: protected characteristics (immutability) and social perception ===
The UNHCR document identified two approaches have been used to determine membership in and legitimacy of PSGs:

1. The protected characteristics (or immutability) approach: This approach examines whether a group is united by one of these:
  - An innate immutable characteristic (such as sex or ethnicity)
  - An immutable characteristic that is not innate but is unalterable for other reasons (such as the historical fact of a past association, occupation, or status)
  - A characteristic that is so fundamental to human dignity that a person should not be required to change it.
2. The social perception approach: This approach examines whether or not the group shares a common characteristic which makes them a cognizable group or sets them apart from the society at large.

The UNHCR document provides the following guidance regarding the interpretation of the protected characteristic approach:

A particular social group is a group of persons who share a common characteristic other than their risk of being persecuted, or who are perceived as a group by society. The characteristic will often be one which is innate, unchangeable, or which is otherwise fundamental to identity, conscience or the exercise of one’s human rights.

=== Additional observations ===
The UNHCR document offered the following additional guidelines regarding PSG membership:

- Persecution cannot alone be used to define PSG status, but it can be part of the social perception case for PSG status, i.e., the fact that people having a characteristic are persecuted is evidence that that characteristic is socially perceived as making them a distinct group.
- The PSG need not be cohesive, i.e., the members may not know one another or be coordinating towards any common goal.
- Not all members of the PSG need be persecuted. The document notes that members of the group may not be at risk if, for example, they hide their shared characteristic, they are not known to the persecutors, or they cooperate with the persecutor.
- The size of a PSG should not be a relevant consideration. PSGs can range from small minorities to groups such as "women" (who constitute about half the population).
- Persecution by non-state actors is relevant if either the persecution itself is targeted based on membership in the PSG, or the state's unwillingness to help the victim of persecution is due to the victim's membership in the PSG.

== United States ==
The application of the PSG criterion in the United States is governed by decisions and clarifications made by the Board of Immigration Appeals as well as the United States courts of appeals. Officials and judges have considerable interpretive latitude in determining PSG status.

=== Membership in a particular social group must be based on a characteristic that one either cannot change or should not be forced to change ===
In Matter of Acosta (1985), the Board of Immigration Appeals interpreted the 1951 Convention to come up with a rule of thumb for determining what constitutes a PSG for the purpose of the Convention. BIA compared it to the other four grounds for refugee status, and noted that two of them (race and nationality) were based on characteristics that one cannot change, whereas the other two (religion and political opinion) were based on characteristics one should not be required to change. Generalizing from this, they argued that for a group to qualify as a PSG for the purpose of refugee status, it must be either a characteristic one cannot change or a characteristic one should not be required to change. This approach would be characterized by the UNHCR in 2002 as the "protected characteristics" approach.

=== Particularity and social visibility ===
Drawing on the 2002 UNHCR guidelines, a series of decisions by BIA made 2008 onward gave importance to two additional criteria for defining a PSG: particularity and social visibility. However, unlike the UNHCR guidelines, which suggested social visibility as a way to identify PSGs that might get filtered out by the protected characteristics approach, the BIA decisions endorsed the logic that these criteria need to be met over and above the protected characteristic criterion.

1. Particularity: The social group in question must be identified in the broader society as a discrete class of persons.
2. Social visibility: Membership in the social group should generally be recognizable by others in the community.

The BIA decisions received criticism from many angles. Some critics argued that the notions of particularity and social visibility had been conflated, and that the decision left unclear whether social visibility ought to be interpreted as literal or figurative visibility.

== Australia ==
In Australia, particular social groups are defined in Section 5L of the Migration Act 1958. The Act allows families to form particular social groups. Alternatively, people sharing an actual or perceived characteristic are considered members of a particular social group, provided the characteristic:

- is innate or immutable
- is so fundamental to the person's identity or conscience that they should not be forced to renounce it, or
- distinguishes the group from the society

However, the characteristic cannot be a fear of persecution.

This approach combines the protected characteristics and social perception approaches established by UNHCR, and applies to refugee applications lodged after 16 December 2014.

== Canada ==
The Immigration and Refugee Board of Canada is responsible for guidelines related to determining refugee status, including criteria for membership in a particular social group. The IRB and various scholars of Canadian refugee law have identified two key Supreme Court of Canada decisions that have helped delineate the definition of PSG: Canada (Attorney General) v. Ward (1993) and Chan v. Canada (Minister of Employment and Immigration) (1995).

The Ward decision cited the Supreme Court's use of tests in Mayers, Cheung, and the United States' Matter of Acosta to identify three possible categories of PSGs:

1. Groups defined by an innate or unchangeable characteristic;
2. groups whose members voluntarily associate for reasons so fundamental to their human dignity that they should not be forced to forsake the association; and
3. groups associated by a former voluntary status, unalterable due to its historical permanence.

The IRB has identified the Supreme Court of Canada's decision in Ward as providing an interpretative foundation for PSG membership.

The categories identified in Ward were further clarified in Chan:

1. The Ward decision enunciated a working rule and "not an unyielding deterministic approach to resolving whether a refugee claimant could be classified within a particular social group." The paramount consideration in determining a particular social group is the "general underlying themes of the defence of human rights and anti-discrimination."
2. The "is versus does" distinction was not intended to replace the Ward categories. There must be proper consideration of the context in which the claim arose.
3. With respect to category two of the Ward categories and the position taken by the Court of Appeal in Chan that this category required an active association between members of the group, Mr. Justice La Forest stated: "In order to avoid any confusion on this point let me state incontrovertibly that a refugee alleging membership in a particular social group does not have to be in voluntary association with other persons similar to him- or herself."

PSGs identified in Canadian jurisprudence include the family, homosexuals, trade unions, the poor, women subject to abuse or coercion of various kinds, and others.

== United Kingdom ==
Asylum cases are first processed by the Home Office. They may be appealed to the First-Tier Tribunal of the Immigration and Asylum Chambers. The unsuccessful side may appeal to the Upper Tribunal. The unsuccessful side may then appeal to the Court of Appeal. Precedents may be set by previous decisions at each stage.

Asylum decisions in the UK based on particular social groups have stressed the need to make a two-fold case:

- The persecution requirement: The applicant must demonstrate persecution or risk of persecution from staying in his or her homeland.
- The nexus requirement: The applicant must demonstrate the connection between the persecution and membership in the particular social group.

=== Tests for domestic violence asylum decisions ===
In 1999, the House of Lords in the United Kingdom granted asylum to two Pakistani women based on severe violence they faced at their husbands' hands and their fears of false charges of adultery. The case established three necessary conditions for women to get asylum for domestic violence based on particular social group status:

1. A failure of state protection
2. Women in her state are treated sufficiently poorly as to constitute a PSG
3. She lacks an internal flight alternative, i.e., she cannot realistically relocate elsewhere within the country and avoid persecution.
