= Lansing v. Smith =

Case law in American jurisprudence

Lansing v. Smith, 4 Wend. 9 (1829), is a case decided by the Court of Appeals of New York which is relevant to eminent domain law. The case held that:

People of a state are entitled to all rights which formerly belong to the King, by his prerogative.

In Lansing v. Smith, a statute of New York authorized the construction of a basin in the Hudson at Albany, and erections whereby the docks, etc., of the plaintiff were rendered inaccessible by vessels. Despite this harm, it was determined that the act, although it provided no compensation for such injury, was not unconstitutional, either as taking private property for public use without compensation or as impairing the obligation of contracts; that the plaintiff had not at common law, as owner of the adjacent soil, nor by virtue of a grant from the State for land under water opposite to the shore, and under which he claimed, a right 'to the natural flow of the river with which the State had no right to interfere by any erection in the bed of the river or in any other manner.'

The United States Supreme Court, in the later case of Shively v. Bowlby, 152 U.S. 1, 21 (1894), cited Lansing as standing for the following proposition:

In New York, it was long considered as settled law that the state succeeded to all the rights of the crown and parliament of England in lands under tide waters, and that the owner of land bounded by a navigable river within the ebb and flow of the tide had no private title or right in the shore below high-water mark, and was entitled to no compensation for the construction, under a grant from the legislature of the state, of a railroad along the shore between high and low-water mark, cutting off all access from his land to the river, except across the railroad.

== Notes ==
- The particular citation of this case, 4 Wend. 9, is an abbreviation indicating that the case begins in Volume 4 of Wendell's Reports, at page 9. Wendell's Reports was the name of New York's official case reporter from 1828 to 1841, named for the editor of the volumes, Judge John L. Wendell.
