= Eaton v. Boston, Concord & Montreal Rail Road =

Eaton vs. Boston, Concord & Montreal Railroad (B., C. & M.R.R.) was a New Hampshire Supreme Court case decided in 1872 between farmer Ezra B. Eaton and the railroad company. Eaton asked the court to decide if the B., C. & M.R.R. flooding of his farm was considered a "taking" under the Fifth Amendment's eminent domain clause, and if the railroad was responsible for compensation to the farmer for the taking. The court asked if "a release of all damages on account of the laying out or construction of a railroad through and over the land of the releasor, does not cover damages occasioned to the remaining land of the releasor by the construction of the railroad over the land of other persons". In 1851, after construction of the railroad, Eaton gave the defendants a warranty deed for the part of his farm where the railroad was located and signed the following release: "I, the subscriber, do hereby acknowledge that I have received of the Boston, Concord, & Montreal Railroad the sum of two hundred and seventy-five dollars, in full for the amount of damages assessed to me by the railroad commissioners of the State of New Hampshire, in conjunction with the selectmen of Wentworth, on account of the laying out of the said Boston, Concord, & Montreal Railroad through and over my land; and I do hereby release and discharge the said corporation from said damages".

The case deals with the legal concepts of eminent domain and strict liability (which received attention as a result of the need to address new and expanding issues created by the emergence and growth of railroads in the United States during the nineteenth century), and occupies a significant place in the historical background of eminent-domain and property-rights cases which emerged with the development of the railroads.

== Background and related cases ==
=== Facts of the case ===
Eaton, a Wentworth, New Hampshire farmer, brought a civil action for damages (the flooding of his farm) against the B., C. & M.R.R. During construction of a road needed to build the railroad the company cut deeply into a ridge bordering Eaton's farm, removing a natural barrier to floods on surrounding farms (including Eaton's). As a result of the cut into the ridge several farms (including Eaton's) were damaged by flooding, which deposited sand and stone and prevented cultivation: "In consequence of this removal [natural barrier], the waters of the river, in times of floods and freshets, sometimes flowed on to E.'s land, carrying sand, gravel, and stones thereon". Eaton had signed a waiver of damages releasing the company from liability for the "laying out of railroad over his land," for which he was compensated. The defendants argued that Eaton's 1851 release waived their liability for the damage caused by the flooding of his property. The court ruled that the waiver only protected the railroad from liability resulting from the taking of Eaton's property "for the laying out of road" and not for damages resulting from the "construction" of the railroad (which caused the flooding of Eaton's land), noting that " ... this was a taking of E.'s property, within the meaning of the constitutional prohibition; and that the legislature could not authorize the infliction of such an injury without making provision for compensation".

The case, like similar ones involving railroads during the late 19th century, dealt with new legal issues and created precedents for law emerging from the development of the railroad system. Because the railroad was a new technology, courts in the past had not been faced with these issues. Eaton addressed legal and regulatory issues which emerged during the years after the 1872 decision: the exercise of power conferred by charter and eminent-domain questions (what constitutes a taking, what is considered public good and what is just compensation). Until 1870 much railroad law favored the industry, but Ely notes that after 1870 " ... lawmakers gradually shifted their focus toward controlling the behavior of the iron horse".

=== Northern Transportation Company of Ohio v. Chicago (1878) ===
==== Introduction ====
This is a notable late-19th-century eminent-domain case because it makes a distinction between what is (and is not) eminent domain. In this case, unlike Eaton , no invasion was made to the property holder during the construction of a tunnel as part of a public-works project. The plaintiff was inconvenienced by construction, which included a cofferdam blocking its riverside access. Earlier in the century, mill cases involving private property owners raised questions about dominion rights over one's land (for example, the right of an owner to obstruct the flow of water from an adjacent steam shared by another landowner. These early cases usually sided with common law, which forbade the obstruction or manipulation of water flow from an adjacent stream to deprive another landowner of the right to fully enjoy his land.

==== Facts ====
The Northern Transportation Company, in Ohio, owned and operated a line of steamers running from Ogdensburgh along the Chicago River to Chicago. In addition to a dock and wharf rights, the company owned a lot in Chicago housing its offices and a shed where the steamers were stored and maintained. The east portion of the lot faced LaSalle Street, and the south portion faced the Chicago River. The city began construction of a tunnel under the Chicago River and along LaSalle Street in 1869. Part of the construction involved excavating a portion of LaSalle street around the southeast portion of the Northern Transportation Company lot. The excavation allegedly caused the walls on the southeast portion of the plaintiff's lot to sink and crack. In addition to the damages caused by the excavation of a portion of LaSalle Street, the plaintiff alleged that during construction a cofferdam was built in front of its dock which prevented "the enjoyment of their land" by blocking its warehouse doors. This left its sole access an entrance on Water Street, leaving its storage and maintenance inaccessible and requiring the plaintiff to rent an adjacent space. The plaintiff also argued that as a result of the cofferdam construction, it could not bring boats to the dock to land freight or passengers; the LaSalle Street excavation was negligent and improper for the type of work performed. The plaintiff alleged damages to its warehouse, including the cracking and falling of walls. Although access to the lot from the river and street was obstructed from time to time, the court held that these were "incidental inconveniences" to which the plaintiff must submit to allow the public to benefit from the tunnel. According to the court, the only question remaining for a jury to decide was whether the LaSalle Street excavation was conducted in an "unskillful" or "negligent" way (causing part of the building's walls to fall). A judgement was decided in favor of the defendant. The court noted that unlike Eaton, where there was a physical invasion of the real estate, the construction merely inconvenienced the plaintiffs and did not amount to eminent domain.

=== Gibson v. United States (1897) ===
==== Introduction ====
Gibson is also important in the history of eminent-domain cases such as Eaton. Both cases, dealing with the Fifth Amendment's eminent-domain clause, focus on its meaning in relation to the construction of an entity which damages private property. In Eaton, the damage is a subsidiary effect of the removal of a natural land barrier by a railroad during the construction of a road required to continue construction of a railroad line. In Gibson, under the River and Harbor Acts of 1884 and 1886 Congress authorized the construction of a levee about 2,200 feet (670 m) long along a portion of the Ohio River near Neville Island. As a result of the levee's construction, the Gibson farm landing (occupying part of the levee's location and necessary to navigate to the channel to deliver farm produce to buyers) was partially blocked. In Gibson (unlike Eaton) the court decided in favor of the government, noting that it was not responsible for the damage to Gibson's farm (the alleged devaluation of the acreage).

==== Facts ====
Gibson owned a farm along the Ohio River near Neville Island, 9 miles (14 km) west of Pittsburgh, The farm provided strawberries, raspberries, potatoes, melons, apples and peaches to Pittsburgh via the Allegheny River. The River and Harbor Acts of July 5, 1884 (23 Stat. 133, 147) and August 5, 1886 (24 Stat. 310, 327) authorized construction of a levee "to concentrate the water-flow in the main channel of the Ohio river, beginning at a point on said Neville island 400 feet east of the claimant's farm, and running in a northwesterly direction with the main or navigable channel of the said Ohio river to the outer point of a bar in said river known as 'Merriman's Bar' ...". The levee's construction "substantially destroyed the landing of the claimant, by preventing the free egress and ingress to and from said landing on and in front of the claimant's farm, to the main or navigable channel of said river". As a result, the claimant was unable to use her land for the shipment of farm products to buyers. It was also claimed that as a result of the levee's construction, Gibson's land (which "was worth $600 per acre before the construction") had depreciated to "$150 to $200 per acre" and Gibson claimed that the total loss of land value "exceed[ed] the sum of $3,000". The farm, with hindered access to a navigable channel of the Ohio River (necessary for the transportation of produce), was damaged and devalued. This category of eminent domain, known as regulatory taking, predominated during the early 19th century during early mill cases in which adjacent riparian landowners were prevented from obstructing streams relied on by other properties. In Gibson, the court ruled that the claimant was not entitled to the recovery of damages and the United States was not responsible for the presumptive regulatory taking of Gibson's land by the construction of a levee obstructing the farmer's landing and reducing shipping from the farm.

=== United States railroads ===
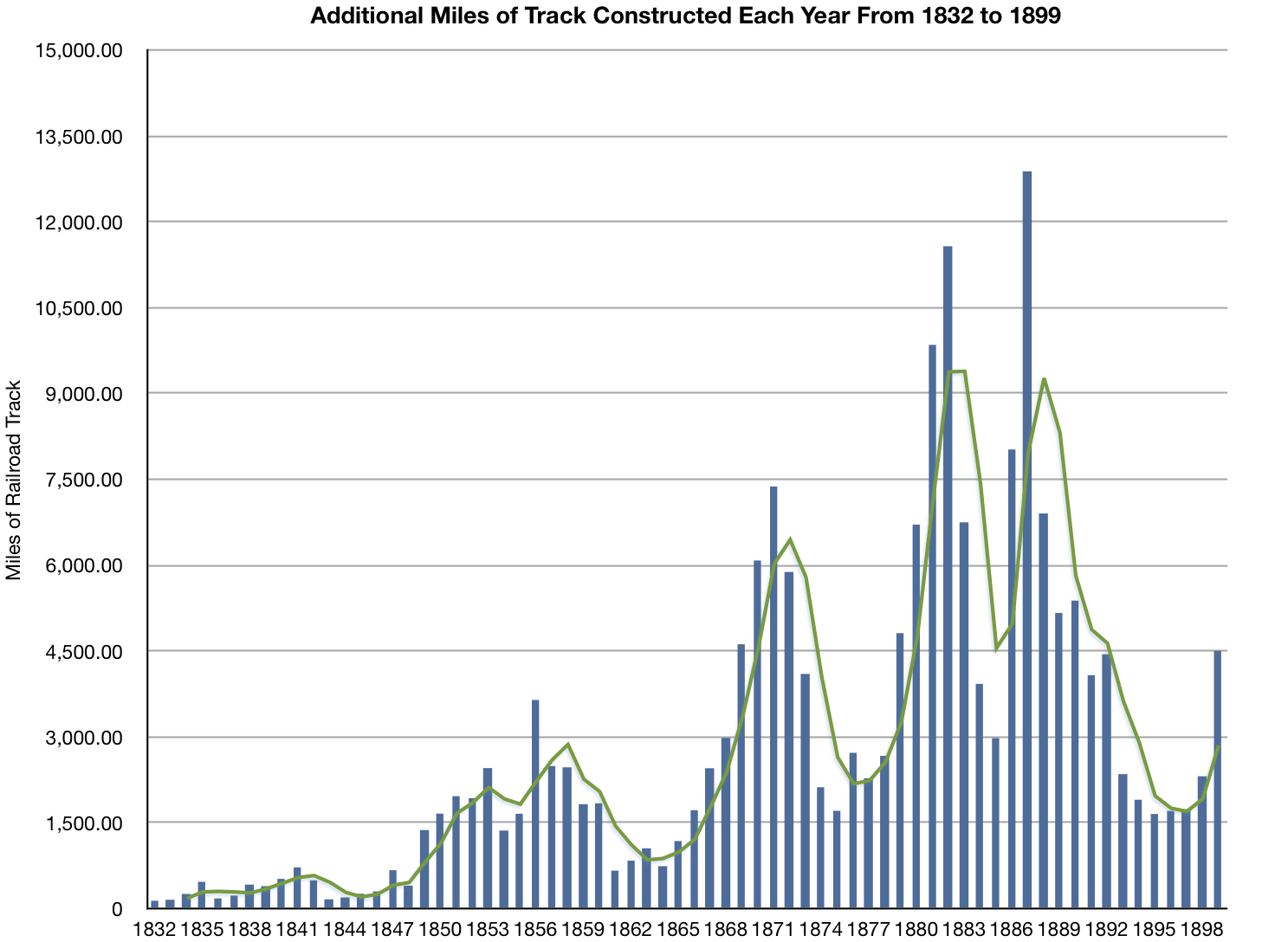
Growth in U.S. railroads from 1832 to 1899

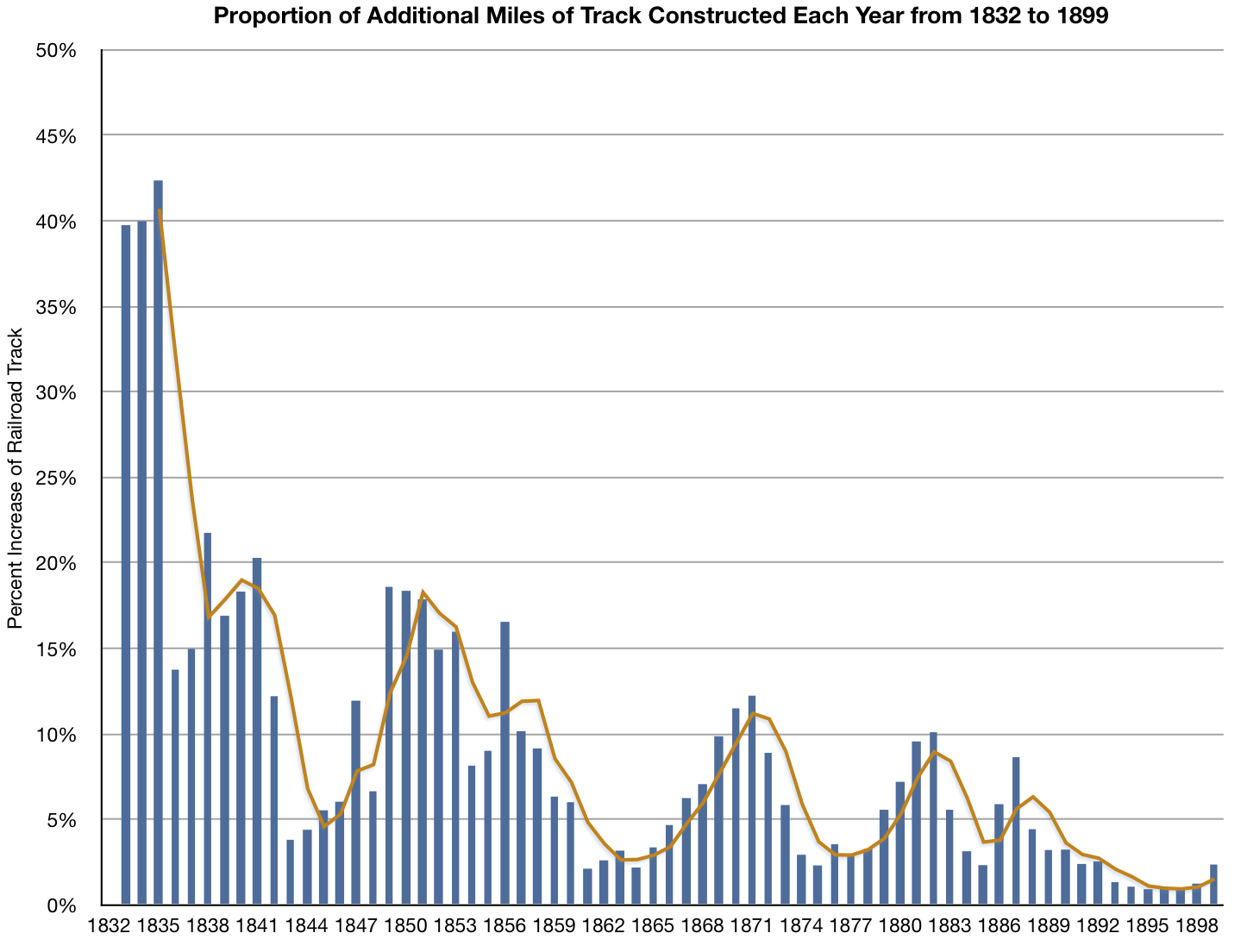
Percentage increase in U.S. railroad-track mileage, 1832 to 1899

The railroad's development, connecting the U.S. during the late 19th century, did what the steamboat had done to colonize the Louisiana Territory and much of the South at the beginning of the century. Through an intricate canal system funded by local governments, steamboat travel was made possible to much of the southern United States during the 19th century. While the railroad developed its infrastructure, canals continued to be expanded.

The first industry in U.S. history to be extensively regulated, the railroad's impact was widespread; the nation's legal system developed as a reaction to policies attempting to regulate the railroads. From 1891 to 1906, nearly 25 percent of cases heard by the United States Court of Appeals for the Ninth Circuit were railroad-related. According to James W. Ely, "The law of railroads reflected the goals and concerns of American society".

=== Property rights: a shift in legal orthodoxy ===
The change in a judicial ideology about property rights during the early 19th century had far-reaching effects on the later development of the railroad. Beginning with mill cases during the late 18th century, courts began to change the application of common-law property rights. Two major common-law assumptions existed which would later be challenged in emerging disputes involving the rights of mill owners to obstruct the natural flow of streams adjacent to their property. Eighteenth-century English common law considered artificial influence to streams impermissible. A judge deciding a case in the New Jersey Supreme Court wrote, "The right to enjoyment of land is a basic attribute of dominion over property". This premise was based on the belief that the diversion or obstruction of streams adjacent to multiple property owners, without the consent of all interested parties, was an infringement of the natural right of enjoyment of one's land. Courts favored anti-developmental claims over economic development. "Conflicts over the use of land were invariably resolved in favor of economic inactivity". In 1783, courts began upholding the rights of new property owners to develop their land for economic purposes. In Shorey v. Gorrell (a case decided by the Massachusetts Supreme Court in 1783), "without long usage sufficient to confer a prescriptive right, there is no legal basis for preventing newcomers from obstructing a stream." The mill cases highlighted the pro-economic favoritism of the judiciary, an initiative contradicting 18th-century common-law orthodoxy. As the railroads emerged, many cases between private landowners such as Ezra B. Eaton and railroads accused of violating property rights would encounter pro-economic judicial forces (often deciding in favor of enterprises yielding the greatest economic benefit for the community or state) and overshadowing the preceding century's common-law principles. Horwitz wrote about some of the insights of the new judiciary, "Some attempted the modification of common-law definition of injury to permit extensive, uncompensated use of water for business purposes". In the 1805 Palmer v. Mulligan, the New York Supreme Court asserted for the first time that upstream land owners could obstruct the flow of water for mill use. The court reasoned that to prevent a newcomer from obstructing part of a stream would inherently confer exclusive rights to "whomever first built a dam," and resolved that "competition and rivalry is always good for [the] public". The outcome of this case set a legal precedent, used by pro-economic judges tasked with determining injury related to water and property rights. The reasonable-use test, or balancing test, became the threshold in determining the merits of an injury caused to a property owner by the obstruction of naturally-flowing water by another. As its name implies, the reasonable-use test gave precedence for the first time to a property owner's right to use their land for economic development (regardless of the development's detriment to another property owner). In 1818, following Mulligan, Platt v. Johnson upheld upstream mill owners' right to obstruct streams adjacent to downstream property owners. This case exemplified a shift in the judiciary favoring pro-economic-development land rights, citing the common-law maximum sic utere ("use it thus")—the shortened version of sic utere tuo ut alienum non laedas ("use [what is] yours so as not to harm [what is] of others")—to justify property owners' use of land for economic interests (contradicting the maxim's original meaning). In Shorey, Mulligan and Johnson, the early 19th-century courts introduced the view that injury was determined by "relative efficiencies of conflicting property uses" (as opposed to the English common-law tradition ensuring a natural right of enjoyment).

=== Canals and exclusive franchise rights ===
With a system of interconnected canals and rivers, a new form of transportation connected the colonies and encouraged westward development. The early 19th century's steam-powered boats did for the transportation infrastructure what the railroads would do in the second half of the century. Railroads were expensive, and obtaining funding for a system of interconnected track crossing municipalities and states was challenging. Much investment had developed a canal system in the U.S., which was threatened by more cost-effective transport. As a result, canal companies resisted railroad agreements allowing the construction of rail lines along existing canals. Receiving earlier charters, canals used this as an argument for exclusivity. From the 1820s through the 1830s, canal attacks on the legitimacy of railroad charters were successful. In 1832, Chesapeake and Ohio Canal Company v. Baltimore and Ohio Rail Road Company involved a dispute over the Potomac River valley and proprietary rights to land selection. Although both parties had rights to purchase the land, the court upheld the exclusive privilege of the canal company. This threatened new railroad ventures, since the court's decision protected the canal company's right to purchase land (excluding potentially-viable rail companies from doing so). However, in 1837 the Supreme Court of the United States rejected the premise of exclusive privilege in purchasing rights in Charles River Bridge v. Warren Bridge. Citing jeopardy to the development of modern transportation that allowing a proprietary right to purchase land through the conferred exclusivity of a charter would create, the court struck down any assumed exclusive purchasing rights by canal companies. This decision benefited the railroads, allowing rail companies equal opportunity to purchase land for development and stimulating growth in railroad infrastructure.

=== Monopoly development model ===
The conflict between local economic interests and the need for a national transportation network was demonstrated in the Erie War. Railroad development primarily followed a monopoly development model during the first half of the 19th century. Building railroads required a large capital investment. While many canals and turnpikes remained in operation, it was becoming clearer that railroad flexibility and efficiency would eclipse contemporary transportation and freight networks. Local and state governments with a vested economic interest in canals and turnpikes, who would hold heavier interests in railroads, desired to protect their investment. Although early railroads were funded by local investors, state and local economic interests relied on their performance. Local governments were eager to invest in railroads through bonds, since local development promised to benefit the local economy. In 1832 the New Jersey state legislature issued exclusive charter rights to the Camden and Amboy Railroad Company, exclusively authorizing it to carry passengers and goods across New Jersey and between New York City and Philadelphia. "The Camden and Amboy was immediately a financial success, and the payment of dividends and transit duties constituted the principal source of revenue in the state budget." The monopoly model was advantageous as a first step in railroad development, allowing secured private investments in doubtful ventures. As railroads became a promising source of revenue for local and state governments, legislative precautions were taken to sustain the exchange. Mandated track-gauge differences were a primary way for state and local governments to ensure that rival out-of-state railroads could not interconnect and bypass local lines.
