= Hawaii Housing Authority v. Midkiff =

- Supreme Court of the United States

Argued March 26th, 1984 Decided May 30th, 1984
- Full case name: Hawaii Housing Authority, et al. v. Midkiff, et al.
- Citations: 467 U.S. 229 (more) 104 S. Ct. 2321, 81 L. Ed. 2d 186, 1984 U.S. LEXIS 94

Case history
- Prior: Summary judgment for defendant, Midkiff v. Tom, 483 F. Supp. 62 (D. Haw. 1979); reversed, 702 F.2d 788 (9th Cir. 1983); probable jurisdiction noted, 464 U.S. 932 (1983).

Holding
- The state can use eminent domain powers to redistribute concentrated property ownership to a larger group of people.

Court membership
- Chief Justice Warren E. Burger Associate Justices William J. Brennan Jr. · Byron White; Thurgood Marshall · Harry Blackmun; Lewis F. Powell Jr. · William Rehnquist; John P. Stevens · Sandra Day O'Connor

Case opinion
- Majority: O'Connor, joined by unanimous
- Marshall took no part in the consideration or decision of the case.

Laws applied
- U.S. Const. amend. V

Hawaii Housing Authority v. Midkiff, 467 U.S. 229 (1984), was a case in which the United States Supreme Court held that a state could use eminent domain to take land that was overwhelmingly concentrated in the hands of private landowners and redistribute it to the wider population of private residents.

== Background ==
Only 72 landowners owned 47.5% of the fee simple titles in the island of Oahu, and the Hawaii State Legislature concluded that there was an oligopoly in land ownership that was "skewing the State's residential fee simple market, inflating land prices, and injuring the public tranquility and welfare."

However, the shortage of buildable land on Oahu was largely because roughly half of the island is government-owned and thus unavailable for privately owned housing.

The Hawaii legislature enacted a condemnation scheme, which was intended to transfer titles to the lots from its owner, the Bishop Estate, to the home lessees. The case focused on the taking of land held by the Bishop Estate, a charitable trust that held the residual lands of the Hawaiian monarchy, and used the proceeds to support the Kamehameha schools, which provide an education to Hawaiian children. The Bishop Estate had subdivided some of its land on Oahu and leased individual lots to land lessees, who built homes on them and at first paid nominal rents to the estate.

However, as Oahu land values rose, so did rents, and the tenants demanded the state acquire the Estate's title and reconvey the individual lots to the lessee-homeowners, who would have to pay fair market value to reimburse the state for the acquisition.

== Decision ==
The Court's decision looked to Berman v. Parker (1954) in which eminent domain power had been used to redevelop slum areas and for the possible sale or lease of the condemned lands for private interest.

The Court decided that the United States Congress had the power to determine what was for the public good over the judiciary. The decision equated police power with the eminent domain of the sovereign's public use requirement.

In an 8-0 decision, the Court voted that the Hawaii law was constitutional. Hawaii's act to regulate the oligopoly was seen as a classic exercise of the State's police powers, and a comprehensive and rational approach to identifying and correcting market failure and satisfied the public use doctrine. Land did not have to be put into actual public use in order to use eminent domain. It is the taking's purpose, and not its mechanics that were important. Here, eminent domain was used to provide an overall market benefit to the wider populace.

The decision suggested that a judicial deference to the legislature was involved. If the legislature determines there are substantial reasons for the exercise of the taking power, courts must defer to the legislature's determination that the taking will serve a public use.

The Court held that the takings to correct concentrated property ownership was a legitimate public purpose.

=== Limitations of the decision ===
The decision, though, placed limits on the power of the government, stating:

A purely private taking could not withstand the scrutiny of the public use requirement; it would serve no legitimate purpose of government and would thus be void.... The Court's cases have repeatedly stated that 'one person's property may not be taken for the benefit of another private person without a justifying public purpose, even though compensation be paid.’

== Aftermath ==
However, the aftermath of the Midkiff decision failed to achieve the stated purpose of the redistribution legislation. It could not create new housing because it transferred title from the land lessor only to the lessee-homeowners who already occupied existing homes on the subject property. As soon as the former lessees acquired fee simple titles to their homes, their homes became attractive to Japanese investors who paid high prices for those homes, largely in the upscale Kahala and Hawaii Kai neighborhoods. That led to a ripple effect throughout the island.

Home prices on Oahu, far from falling, as had been intended by the legislature, surged upward and more than doubled within six years.

The primary holding of Midkiff was reaffirmed by Kelo v. City of New London (2005).

== See also ==
- List of United States Supreme Court cases, volume 467
