= Berman v. Parker =

- Supreme Court of the United States

Argued October 19, 1954 Decided November 22, 1954
- Full case name: Berman et al., Executors v. Parker, et al.
- Citations: 348 U.S. 26 (more) 75 S. Ct. 98; 99 L. Ed. 27; 1954 U.S. LEXIS 1463

Holding
- The taking of private property for a public purpose, provided that just compensation is paid, does not violate the Fifth Amendment.

Court membership
- Chief Justice Earl Warren Associate Justices Hugo Black · Stanley F. Reed; Felix Frankfurter · William O. Douglas; Harold H. Burton · Tom C. Clark; Sherman Minton

Case opinion
- Majority: Douglas, joined by unanimous

Laws applied
- U.S. Const. amend. V, District of Columbia Redevelopment Act of 1945

Berman v. Parker, 348 U.S. 26 (1954), is a landmark decision of the United States Supreme Court that interpreted the Takings Clause ("nor shall private property be taken for public use, without just compensation") of the Fifth Amendment to the United States Constitution. The Court voted 8–0 (Note: Justice Robert H. Jackson did not participate, as he had died 10 days before oral arguments were heard. Jackson's successor, John Marshall Harlan II, would not take his seat on the Court until March 1955.) to hold that private property could be taken for a public purpose with just compensation. The case laid the foundation for the Court's later important public use cases, Hawaii Housing Authority v. Midkiff, 467 U.S. 229 (1984) and Kelo v. City of New London, 545 U.S. 469 (2005).

Critics of recent occurrences of eminent domain uses trace what they view as property rights violations to this case.

== Background ==
The United States Congress passed the District of Columbia Redevelopment Act of 1945, Pub. L. 79–592, 60 Stat. 790, enacted August 2, 1946, to address the vast blighted area found in the District of Columbia. The Act created a commission of five members called the District of Columbia Redevelopment Land Agency and granted it the power to redevelop blighted areas and eliminate any "blighting factors or causes of blight." The act granted the Agency the power of eminent domain, if necessary, to transfer private property from the original owner to a private entity to serve the public purpose of redevelopment. The Act was not only concerned with clearing slums but also with modernizing the urban environment.

The first project under the Act was Project Area B in Southwest Washington, D.C. In 1950, the National Capital Planning Commission published a comprehensive plan for the area after surveys indicated that in that area, "64.3% of the dwellings were beyond repair, 18.4% needed major repairs, only 17.3% were satisfactory; 57.8% of the dwellings had outside toilets, 60.3% had no baths, 29.6% lacked electricity, 82.2% had no wash basins or laundry tubs, 83.8% lacked central heating." The plan made provisions for the types of dwelling units and provided that "at least one-third of them [were] to be low-rent housing with a maximum rental of $17 per room per month." The plan was approved by the Commissioners and the Agency began redevelopment of the area. It was during the beginning stages of this redevelopment that the plaintiffs brought suit to challenge the constitutionality of the taking of their department store, located at 712 Fourth Street, S.W. in Area B.

The plaintiff in the case, Max Morris, owned a department store that was not itself blighted but that was scheduled to be taken by eminent domain in order to clear the larger blighted area where it was located. Plaintiffs argued that this property was not slum housing and that it could not be taken for a project under the management of a private agency to be redeveloped for private use simply to make the community more attractive overall. The owners further argued that taking the land under eminent domain and giving it to redevelopers amounted to "a taking from one businessman for the benefit of another businessman" and did not constitute a public use, thus violating the Fifth Amendment to the Constitution. Morris died while the case was under review. His executors, including Samuel Berman, continued the case for the Morris estate.

Berman's challenge to the constitutionality of the District of Columbia Redevelopment Act was heard by a special three-judge panel district court. The key issue addressed was the government's ability and scope to take and transfer private property to private developers as part of a project to clear blight from an entire area.

E. Barrett Prettyman, the D.C. Circuit judge who wrote the opinion, found no problem with the government's use of eminent domain to clear blighted structures because it could be seen as the abatement of a public nuisance.

However, Judge Prettyman saw the land on which the blighted structures were located as a different matter and as having nothing inherently to do with blight. Such land, he felt, could be taken by eminent domain only if it actually helped to combat the blight that existed on the property.

Judge Prettyman ultimately read the Redevelopment Act very narrowly and found that non-blighted property could be taken if the taking could be tied to prevention of blight. He firmly stated, however, that eminent domain could not be used by the government to take private property for the purpose of improving economic or aesthetic conditions of neighborhoods.

Therefore, he granted the government's motion to dismiss but also raised the seriousness of using eminent domain to serve broad redevelopment projects.

== Decision ==
The Supreme Court unanimously decided in favor of the Planning Commission by arguing that the problem of large-scale blight needed to be addressed by a large-scale integrated redevelopment plan. Justice Douglas wrote, "If owner after owner were permitted to resist these redevelopment programs on the ground that his particular property was not being used against the public interest, integrated plans for redevelopment would suffer greatly."

As the Planning Commission had made detailed plans and taken extensive surveys of the area in question, the Supreme Court argued for judicial restraint. Douglas wrote, "In the present case, the Congress and its authorized agencies have made determinations that take into account a wide variety of values. It is not for us to reappraise them."

The Court stated that the Fifth Amendment had nothing to prohibit those who govern the District of Columbia from deciding that the Capital should be "beautiful as well as sanitary."

As the object of cleaning up the area was said to be within Congress's authority, the Court found a clear right to use eminent domain to accomplish the object.

Douglas addressed the issue presented by the landowners of "a taking from one businessman for the benefit of another businessman" by saying that a legitimate public purpose had been established by the Congress in creating the entire redevelopment plan: the purpose of the taking was to eliminate slums on an area-wide basis. Specific parcels of land may have been unblighted, but the Court found that their taking was necessary for the functioning of the redevelopment plan as a whole.

Justice Douglas expanded the definition of "public use" to include "public purpose" based on physical, aesthetic, and monetary benefits; he stated that the purpose of the redevelopment plan was to address the broader blight issues in the area to prevent the neighborhood from reverting to the blighted conditions.

The Court ultimately declined to address the specifics of the plan: "Once the question of the public purpose has been decided, the amount and character of the land to be taken for a particular tract to complete the integrated plan rests in the discretion of the legislative branch."

The judgment of the District Court was affirmed, but the Supreme Court opinion made it clear that Judge Prettyman's narrow reading of the Act was improper.

== Legacy ==
Berman was reaffirmed in Kelo v. City of New London (2005) in which the Court again allowed taking of unblighted private property. Between Berman and Kelo, the Court held in Hawaii Housing Authority v. Midkiff (1984) that redistribution of land from some private parties to other private parties satisfied the constitutional public use requirement because the state legislature had found that the redistribution might reduce an oligopoly in fee simple land titles.

The legislation upheld by the Supreme Court in Berman provided that inasmuch as the taking of land in the project area would displace a large impoverished, slum-dwelling population, in the new [re]development of that area, at least a third of new dwellings would be required to rent for $17 per room per month. However, after the Berman decision came down, that provision was repealed. Similarly, in Hawaii, the taking of the land lessor's interest was supposed to reduce or stabilize housing prices on Oahu. However, after the Midkiff decision, housing prices on Oahu skyrocketed upward, doubling in about five years. Many of the homes in the taking area, notably in the Kahala area, were bought up by Japanese investors who tore them down and replaced them with luxury homes.

== See also ==
- List of United States Supreme Court cases, volume 348
