= Immigration and Naturalization Service v. Stevic =

INS v. Stevic
- Supreme Court of the United States

Argued December 6, 1983 Decided June 5, 1984
- Full case name: Immigration and Naturalization Service v. Stevic
- Docket no.: 82-973
- Citations: 467 U.S. 407 (more) 104 S. Ct. 2489; 81 L. Ed. 2d 321; 1984 U.S. LEXIS 100

Holding
- An alien must establish a clear probability of persecution to avoid deportation.

Court membership
- Chief Justice Warren E. Burger Associate Justices William J. Brennan Jr. · Byron White; Thurgood Marshall · Harry Blackmun; Lewis F. Powell Jr. · William Rehnquist; John P. Stevens · Sandra Day O'Connor

Case opinion
- Majority: Stevens, joined by unanimous

Laws applied
- Immigration and Nationality Act § 243(h), 8 U.S.C. § 1253(h)

Immigration and Naturalization Service v. Predrag Stevic, 467 U.S. 407 (1984), was a Supreme Court of the United States decision that held if an alien seeks to avoid deportation proceedings by claiming that he will be persecuted if he is returned to his native land, he must show a "clear probability" that he will be persecuted there.

== Facts ==
In 1976, Predrag Stevic, a citizen of Yugoslavia, entered the United States to visit his sister in Chicago. He overstayed his visa, and the Immigration and Naturalization Service began deportation proceedings against him. At the hearing, Stevic conceded that he was deportable and agreed to leave by February 1977. In January 1977, however, he married a United States citizen, who applied for a visa on Stevic's behalf. When Stevic's wife died in a car accident shortly after the wedding, however, the visa was automatically revoked, and the INS ordered Stevic deported.

Stevic then sought withholding of deportation and claimed that he would be persecuted in Yugoslavia for anticommunist activities in which he had engaged after his wedding. He also said that his father-in-law had been imprisoned there, also for anticommunist activities. He claimed he feared persecution if he returned to Yugoslavia.

The Board of Immigration Appeals ultimately denied his application without a hearing and explained that Stevic had not presented any further evidence he would be persecuted in Yugoslavia. The BIA also rejected Stevic's second attempt in 1980 to forestall deportation, despite a change in the law passed by Congress that arguably might have been more favorable to Stevic.

Stevic appealed the 1980 decision to the United States Court of Appeals for the Second Circuit. It held that the law simply required an alien to show a "well-founded fear" of persecution, instead of a "clear probability," and remanded the case to the immigration department for a plenary hearing. The INS asked the Supreme Court to hear the case.

== Opinion of the Court ==
The case centered on the change of the law imposed by Congress in 1980 and whether that change lowered the standard for claiming asylum from a "clear probability" of persecution to a "well-founded fear" of persecution. The Court stated that "in 1980 Congress intended to adopt a standard of withholding of deportation claims by reference to pre-existing sources of law." There were three such sources: United States law before 1968; the United Nations Protocol Relating to the Status of Refugees, to which the United States acceded in 1968; and United States law between 1968 and 1980.

Before 1968, United States law required an alien to demonstrate a clear probability of persecution in order to be eligible for withholding of deportation, which was available to aliens only within the United States, not at the border. The United States Attorney General could not conditionally admit aliens for limited purposes until 1976. The United States acceded to the UN protocol on refugees in 1968, but both the President and the Senate believed that doing so would require no modification of statutory law. In 1973, however, the BIA confronted the issue of whether acceding to the UN protocol had modified the standard for withholding of deportation. It concluded the protocol did not change the standard. Nevertheless, the term "well-founded fear" crept into some court decisions. The Seventh Circuit concluded in 1977 that a well-founded fear of persecution was functionally equivalent to a clear probability of persecution, and the Second, Fifth, and Ninth Circuits reached the same conclusion as well.

In 1980, Congress finally conformed United States statutory law to the UN protocol, but the modifications did not clarify how great a possibility of persecution must exist before the alien can qualify for withholding of removal. The statute spoke of withholding if the alien's life "would" be threatened, not if it "might" or "could" be threatened. Other statutes dealing with the discretionary grant of asylum referred to the well-founded fear standard, but that was not the case for the statutes dealing with withholding of deportation.

The Court thus concluded that some higher standard was required for the alien to receive the mandatory relief of withholding of removal. The Court assumed also that the standard for discretionary relief was lower than that for mandatory relief and so held that "an application [for withholding of deportation] be supported by evidence establishing that it is more likely than not that the alien would be subject to persecution on one of the specified grounds."

The Court determined, "The Court of Appeals granted respondent relief based on its understanding of a standard which, even if properly understood, does not entitle an alien to withholding of deportation under 243(h). Our holding does, of course, require the Court of Appeals to reexamine this record to determine whether the evidence submitted by respondent entitles him to a plenary hearing under the proper standard. The judgment of the Court of Appeals is reversed, and the cause is remanded for further proceedings consistent with this opinion."

Stevic was thus remanded to the Second Circuit to determine whether the alien would be entitled to withholding of deportation under the standard that the Supreme Court had articulated.

== See also ==
- List of United States Supreme Court cases, volume 467
