= List of United States Supreme Court cases, volume 467 =

This is a list of all United States Supreme Court cases from volume 467 of the United States Reports:

Case name	Citation	Date decided
Kirby Forest Industries, Inc. v. United States	467 U.S. 1	1984
Seattle Times Co. v. Rhinehart	467 U.S. 20	1984
Waller v. Georgia	467 U.S. 39	1984
Heckler v. Community Health Serv.	467 U.S. 51	1984
Hishon v. King & Spalding	467 U.S. 69	1984
S,-Cent. Timber Dev., Inc. v. Wunnicke	467 U.S. 82	1984
Heckler v. Day	467 U.S. 104	1984
Three Affiliated Tribes v. Wold Eng'g, P. C.	467 U.S. 138	1984
United States v. Lorenzetti	467 U.S. 167	1984
United States v. Gouveia	467 U.S. 180	1984
Arizona v. Rumsey	467 U.S. 203	1984
Bernal v. Fainter	467 U.S. 216	1984
Haw. Housing Auth. v. Midkiff	467 U.S. 229	1984
New York v. Uplinger	467 U.S. 246	1984
Schall v. Martin	467 U.S. 253	1984
Colorado v. New Mexico	467 U.S. 310	1984
Block v. Cmty. Nutrition Inst.	467 U.S. 340	1984
ICC v. Am. Trucking Ass'ns, Inc.	467 U.S. 354	1984
Aluminum Co. v. Cent. Lincoln Peoples' Util. Dist.	467 U.S. 380	1984
INS v. Stevic	467 U.S. 407	1984
Nix v. Williams	467 U.S. 431	1984
Mich. Canners & Freezers Ass'n, Inc. v. Agric. Marketing & Bargaining Bd.	467 U.S. 461	1984
California v. Trombetta	467 U.S. 479	1984
Preservation of breath samples in DUI cases not required under the Due Process Clause.
Ohio v. Johnson	467 U.S. 493	1984
A trial court's acceptance of a guilty plea to a lesser included offense and dismissal of remaining charges over the prosecution's objections does not prohibit subsequent prosecution of those "remaining" counts.
Mabry v. Johnson	467 U.S. 504	1984
Franchise Tax Bd. v. Postal Service	467 U.S. 512	1984
Furniture Moving Drivers v. Crowley	467 U.S. 526	1984
Firefighters v. Stotts	467 U.S. 561	1984
Hayfield N.R.R. Co. v. Chi. & Nw. Transp. Co.	467 U.S. 622	1984
Armco Inc. v. Hardesty	467 U.S. 638	1984
New York v. Quarles	467 U.S. 649	1984
Capital Cities Cable, Inc. v. Crisp	467 U.S. 691	1984
Pension Benefit Guar. Corp. v. Gray & Co.	467 U.S. 717	1984
SEC v. Jerry T. O'Brien, Inc.	467 U.S. 735	1984
Copperweld Corp. v. Indep. Tube Corp.	467 U.S. 752	1984
United States v. S.A. Empresa De Viação Aérea Rio Grandense	467 U.S. 797	1984
United States v. Morton	467 U.S. 822	1984
Chevron U.S.A., Inc. v. Natural Resources Defense Council, Inc.	467 U.S. 837	1984
Cooper v. Fed. Rsrv. Bank	467 U.S. 867	1984
Sure-Tan, Inc. v. NLRB	467 U.S. 883	1984
Tower v. Glover	467 U.S. 914	1984
Wash. Metro. Area Transit Auth. v. Johnson	467 U.S. 925	1984
Sec'y of State v. Joseph H. Munson Co.	467 U.S. 947	1984
Ruckelshaus v. Monsanto Co.	467 U.S. 986	1984
Patton v. Yount	467 U.S. 1025	1984
