= Board of Immigration Appeals =

United States Department of Justice agency

Agency overview
- Formed: 1940
- Jurisdiction: Federal government of the United States
- Headquarters: Falls Church, Virginia
- Agency executives: Sirce Owen, Acting EOIR Director; Garry Malphrus, Chief Appellate Immigration Judge
- Parent department: U.S. Department of Justice
- Parent agency: Executive Office for Immigration Review
- Website: Official website

The Board of Immigration Appeals (BIA) is an administrative appellate body within the Executive Office for Immigration Review of the United States Department of Justice responsible for reviewing decisions of the U.S. immigration courts and certain actions of U.S. Citizenship Immigration Services, U.S Customs and Border Protection, and U.S. Immigration and Customs Enforcement. The BIA was established in 1940 after the Immigration and Naturalization Service was transferred from the United States Department of Labor to the Department of Justice.

== History ==
=== 1891–1917: Early federal immigration laws ===
The Board of Immigration Appeals traces its origins to the Immigration Act of 1891, which was the first comprehensive federal law that governed the immigration system. The Act established an Office of Immigration within the Department of the Treasury, which would be supervised by a Superintendent of Immigration and responsible for handling immigration functions. The Act also laid out an appeals process where immigrants could appeal the Office's decisions to the Superintendent of Immigration.

Two years later, the Immigration Act of 1893 established three-member Boards of Special Inquiry to decide challenges to decisions of the Office of Immigration that deported or excluded an immigrant seeking to enter the United States.

Congress continued to adjust the immigration system over the coming decades. In 1903, Congress moved immigration functions from the Treasury to the newly created Department of Commerce and Labor. Ten years later, Congress split the Department of Commerce and Labor into a Department of Commerce and a Department of Labor, and assigned responsibility for the immigration system to the latter.

=== 1917–1940: Board of Review, Immigration and Naturalization Service created ===
In 1917, Congress passed the Immigration Act of 1917 that reformed the provisions governing the exclusion and deportation of immigrants.

The Immigration Act of 1921 established a new system of national quotas that limited the number of immigrants from any given country. These reforms significantly increased the number of administrative appeals filed by immigrants and the complexity of each case. The Secretary of Labor established a Board of Review to handle the increased caseload and recommend decisions.

In 1933, Executive Order 6166 centralized all immigration functions within a new Immigration and Naturalization Service in the Department of Labor.

=== 1940–1983: Board of Immigration Appeals created ===
In 1940, President Roosevelt moved the INS to the Department of Justice. The Attorney General replaced the Board of Review with a new Board of Immigration Appeals authorized to decide appeals itself, instead of recommending decisions. The BIA was given significant independence and remains responsible solely to the Attorney General.

In 1952, Congress replaced the complex network of immigration laws with a single statute, titled the Immigration and Nationality Act. Among other things, the statue eliminated the archaic Special Inquiry Boards and gave responsibility for reviewing deportation cases to new special inquiry officers. The role of special inquiry officers was further formalized in 1973, when a new regulation renamed them "immigration judges" and granted them the power to wear judicial robes.

=== 1983–present: Executive Office for Immigration Review created and other reforms ===
In 1983, the Attorney General established the Executive Office for Immigration Review to administer the immigration courts. Immigration judges and the BIA were moved to the EOIR. A new Office of the Chief Immigration Judge was established to supervise the work of immigration judges and immigration courts. The BIA retained its power to decide immigration appeals and establish precedents.

Congress passed significant immigration reforms over the next few years. The Immigration Reform and Control Act of 1986 and related regulations gave EOIR authority to decide cases related to immigration-related employment issues. The Immigration Act of 1990 expanded EOIR's powers to review cases of "document abuse", or misuse of documentation to prove employment eligibility. The Illegal Immigration Reform and Immigrant Responsibility Act of 1996 replaced deportation proceedings and exclusion proceedings with "removal proceedings" and simplified procedures.

The Homeland Security Act of 2002 further clarified EOIR's powers by formally separating it from the INS and codifying the Attorney General's supervisory authority. The Act also abolished the INS and transferred its functions to the newly created Department of Homeland Security.

== Jurisdiction ==
The BIA reviews the decisions of the U.S. immigration courts, some decisions of U.S. Citizenship and Immigration Services, and immigration violation arrests by U.S. Customs and Border Protection and U.S. Immigration and Customs Enforcement. BIA decisions are the final administrative action in a given case, and the next stage of appeal after a BIA decision is usually in the United States courts of appeals if an appeal is allowed by statute.

Most opinions of the BIA are unpublished and do not apply outside of the cases in which they were issued. However, a limited number of BIA decisions are selected for publication in the Administrative Decisions under the Immigration and Nationality Laws of the United States. There are currently 28 volumes of administrative precedent decisions under the Immigration and Nationality laws encompassing decisions dating back to 1940. BIA precedent decisions are legally binding on all components of the Department of Homeland Security (DHS). A precedent decision may be overruled by a published decision of the Attorney General, by a Federal court, by a subsequent BIA precedent decision, or by a change in the law.

The BIA is notable in that one need not be an attorney to appear before it representing a client. However, non-attorneys must be part of a BIA-recognized organization (generally a nonprofit), and also have obtained BIA accreditation as individuals. A practice manual for appearing before the BIA is available from the U.S. Department of Justice.

== Composition ==
The BIA is located in Falls Church, Virginia, and, as of February 2021, has 23 board members, who are administrative judges appointed by the U.S. Attorney General, and six temporary members. The size of the full BIA varies from time to time, depending on resignations, retirements, and new appointments; it may have up to 23 board members under the current authorizing regulation. Decisions issued by the BIA are by three-member panels in limited circumstances. Otherwise, the vast majority of cases are decided by single panel members. In certain circumstances, a single panel member can use a process called summary affirmance to affirm the lower court without issuing a written decision.

=== Current members ===
As of September 25, 2026:

Title	Name	Start	Appointer
Chief Appellate Immigration Judge	Garry Malphrus (Note: Malphrus was initially appointed to the BIA on August 2008 by Michael Mukasey and elevated to Deputy Chief on September 2020 by Bill Barr until he became Acting Chief on January 2025.)	April 2025	Pam Bondi
Deputy Chief Appellate Immigration Judge	Stephanie Gorman	January 2026	Pam Bondi
Deputy Chief Appellate Immigration Judge	Gregory Radics	January 2026	Pam Bondi
Appellate Immigration Judge	Roman Chaban	December 2025	Pam Bondi
Appellate Immigration Judge	Michael Creppy	February 2011	Eric Holder
Appellate Immigration Judge	Sheila Gallow	August 2025	Pam Bondi
Appellate Immigration Judge	Marcos Gemoets	August 2025	Pam Bondi
Appellate Immigration Judge	Deborah Goodwin	August 2019	William Barr
Appellate Immigration Judge	Renae Hansell	January 2026	Pam Bondi
Appellate Immigration Judge	Keith Hunsucker	August 2019	William Barr
Appellate Immigration Judge	Sunita Mahtabfar	August 2020	William Barr
Appellate Immigration Judge	Philip Montante	April 2020	William Barr
Appellate Immigration Judge	Hugh Mullane	August 2008	Michael Mukasey
Appellate Immigration Judge	Sirce Owen (Note: Owen also serves as Acting Director of the Executive Office for Immigration Review since July 27, 2026.)	August 2020	William Barr
Appellate Immigration Judge	Kathleen Volkert	August 2025	Pam Bondi
Temporary Appellate Immigration Judge	Georgina Picos	December 2025	Pam Bondi
Temporary Appellate Immigration Judge	Jeb Terrien	December 2025	Pam Bondi
Temporary Appellate Immigration Judge	Lynn Wang	May 2026	Todd Blanche
Temporary Appellate Immigration Judge	David White	May 2026	Todd Blanche
Temporary Appellate Immigration Judge	Dara Reids	June 2025	Pam Bondi

== See also ==
- Administrative Appeals Office
