= Christine Dunford =

American actress

- Born: The Bronx, New York, U.S.
- Occupation: Actress
- Years active: 1979–present
- Known for: Coach Davis in Love & Basketball

Christine Dunford is an American actress from the Bronx.

== Early life ==
Christine Dunford was born in the Bronx.

== Career ==
Dunford worked two years at the Public Theater in the American premiere of the off-Broadway and Broadway runs of Serious Money and in the lead role of Love's Labours Lost, directed by Gerald Freedman.

Other New York stage appearances include Infidelities at Primary Stages and the title role in Tamara. On the west coast, Dunford starred with Ed Begley, Jr. in David Mamet's The Cryptogram at the Geffen Playhouse. She appeared and in the Bottom's Dream Theater Company productions of Losing Venice and 7 Blow Jobs, and was directed by fellow Juilliard alumnus Keith David in The Shadow Box at the Edgemar Theater.

Since moving to Los Angeles, Dunford has appeared in over 100 television episodes, both as a series regular (Good Sports, Hudson Street with Tony Danza, Something So Right, Bob, with Bob Newhart, and The Secret Lives of Men) and as a guest star (Law & Order: LA, Harry's Law, Two and a Half Men, Boston Legal, Seinfeld, Frasier, 'Til Death, Without a Trace and others). She also co-starred in Fox's The Please Watch the Jon Lovitz Special in 1992. In 2019, Dunford recurred on The Purge as the evil Andrea Ziv. She also appeared on the mentalist (season 6 episode 3).

On film, Dunford made her debut in the 1989's Slaves of New York. The following year, she appeared in Reversal of Fortune alongside Oscar winner Jeremy Irons. Her other film roles include 1997's Ulee's Gold opposite Peter Fonda, 2000's Love & Basketball, How to Go Out on a Date in Queens, and the award-winning short Dos Corazones.

Dunford is also a playwright, and was invited to perform her series of monologues, Out Loud, at HBO's Aspen Comedy Festival as well as at the Edgemar Theater in Los Angeles. She performed another solo show, Toucan in the Bronx, at the Improv in Los Angeles.

In addition to her work on stage and screen, Dunford is a voice artist on several animated series as well as television and radio commercials. She provides narration for documentary films and museum installments, and does voice work for video games in the Mass Effect, Lord of the Rings, Civilization, Hitman, and X-COM series, as well as Warhammer 40,000: Dawn of War, EverQuest, and Infamous Second Son.

== Filmography ==
=== Film ===
Year	Title	Role	Notes
1989	Slaves of New York	B	
1990	Reversal of Fortune	Ellen	
1997	Ulee's Gold	Helen Jackson	
2000	Love & Basketball	Coach Davis	
2001	Soul Survivors	ER Nurse	
2006	How to Go Out on a Date in Queens	Ann Marie	
2011	The American Dream	Cheryl	
2012	Hello Herman	Senator Cox / Computer Voice	
2016	The Bandit Hound	Deb	
2019	Bad Impulse	Radio Announcer	

=== Television ===
Year	Title	Role	Notes
1989	Loving	Betty Sossnen	2 episodes
1990	Law & Order	Reporter	Episode: "By Hooker, by Crook"
1990	Monsters	Laura Daniel	Episode: "Sin-Sop"
1991	Good Sports	Missy Van Johnson	6 episodes
1991	Guilty Until Proven Innocent	Kathy Panzer	Television film
1991	...And Then She Was Gone	Amanda	Television film
1991	Pros and Cons	Mary Elizabeth Davis	Episode: "May the Best Man Win"
1991, 1994	Seinfeld	Saleswoman / Leslie	Episodes: "The Pie", "The Baby Shower"
1992	Civil Wars	Sharon Beckwith	Episode: "Chute First, Ask Questions Later"
1992	Rachel Gunn, R.N.	Evelyn Bigelow	Episode: "A Kept Woman"
1992–1993	Bob	Shayla	7 episodes
1993	The John Larroquette Show	Con Woman	Episode: "Pilot"
1994	Betrayal of Trust	Ms. King	Television film
1994	Grace Under Fire	Trish Baldwin	Episode: "Grace and Beauty"
1994	Hotel Malibu	Carol Radley	Episode: "Advance Reservations"
1994	Dave's World	Simone	Episode: "One Mump or Two?"
1995	Aaahh!!! Real Monsters	Danka / Swik	Episode: "Where Have All the Monsters Gone?"
1995	Cybill	Claire	Episode: "The Curse of Zoey"
1995–1996	Hudson Street	Off. Kirby McIntire	22 episodes
1996	Millennium	A.D.A. Rhonda Preshutski	Episode: "The Well-Worn Lock"
1996–1998	Something So Right	Stephanie Farrell	20 episodes
1997	Early Edition	Elizabeth	Episode: "Psychic"
1998	Ally McBeal	Eva Curry	Episode: "The Playing Field"
1998	Since You've Been Gone	Debbie Johnson	Television film
1999	Chicago Hope	Marcia Loey	Episode: "Curing Cancer"
1999	Judging Amy	Linda Oakes	Episode: "Victim Soul"
1999	Jack & Jill	Workshop Leader	Episode: "Fear and Loathing in Gotham"
2000	Bette	Nadine	Episode: "Diva, Interrupted"
2000, 2001	Family Law	Deborah Atchinson	2 episodes
2003	The Wild Thornberrys	Ms. Collins	Episode: "Look Who's Squawking"
2003	Two and a Half Men	Gloria	Episode: "The Last Thing You Want Is to Wind Up with a Hump"
2003	Frasier	Nancy	Episode: "Guns 'N Neuroses"
2004	Without a Trace	Lily Garrett	Episode: "The Season"
2005	What I Like About You	Leah	Episode: "How to Succeed in Business Without Really Trying to Be a Lesbian"
2005	Crossing Jordan	Nicole	Episode: "Sanctuary"
2005	Wiener Park	Pam Park	Television film
2006	Four Kings	Dana	Episode: "Follow the Money"
2006, 2007	Boston Legal	Attorney Shelley Ford	2 episodes
2007	'Til Death	Vicki	Episode: "The Anniversary Party"
2008, 2018	The Young and the Restless	Warden Rogers / Jean Whitman	2 episodes
2009	Raising the Bar	Ilene Thomasen	Episode: "Hair Apparent"
2011	Harry's Law	Judge Virginia Eden	2 episodes
2011	Law & Order: LA	Attorney Finley	Episode: "Reseda"
2011	Glenn Martin, DDS	Nem-Nem	Episode: "Windfall"
2012	Rizzoli & Isles	Claire Koneff Deluth	Episode: "No More Drama in My Life"
2013	Arrested Development	Lynda the Producer	Episode: "Señoritis"
2013	The Mentalist	Mrs. Bonner	Episode: "Wedding in Red"
2014	Bones	Harriet Kent	Episode: "The Nail in the Coffin"
2015	Longmire	Naomi Bradley	Episode: "The Calling Back"
2017	Back to Love	Jill	Television film
2017	The Gifted	DOJ Official	Episode: "eXtreme measures"
2019	9-1-1	Sadie	Episode: "New Beginnings"
2019	The Purge	Andrea Ziv	4 episodes
2019–2020	Star Wars Resistance	Lt. Galek / Stormtrooper Guard	5 episodes
2021	NCIS	Jeri Fleckman	Episode: "Sangre"
2021	Cowboy Bebop	Whitney Matsumoto	2 episodes
2025	General Hospital	Mabel	1 episode
TBA	Arrivals & Departures	Jaelynn	Episode: "Exotic Creatures"

=== Video games ===
Year	Title	Role	Notes
2009	Warhammer 40,000: Dawn of War II	Ellen Derosa / Farseer Idranel / Howling Banshees	
2010	Warhammer 40,000: Dawn of War II – Chaos Rising	Ellen Derosa / Farseers / Howling Banshees	
2011	Warhammer 40,000: Dawn of War II – Retribution	Ellen Derosa / Farseers / Howling Banshees	
2014	Infamous Second Son	Brooke Augustine	Voice and performance capture
2014	Infamous First Light	Brooke Augustine	Voice and performance capture
2019	The Outer Worlds	Adelaide McDevitt / Additional Voices	
2019	Rage 2	Nosebleed Kate / Abadon Mutants	
2022	Horizon Forbidden West	Additional voices	
