= Jim Wright Farmstead Historic District =

Historic district in Arkansas, United States

- Wright, Jim, Farmstead Historic District
- U.S. National Register of Historic Places
- U.S. Historic district
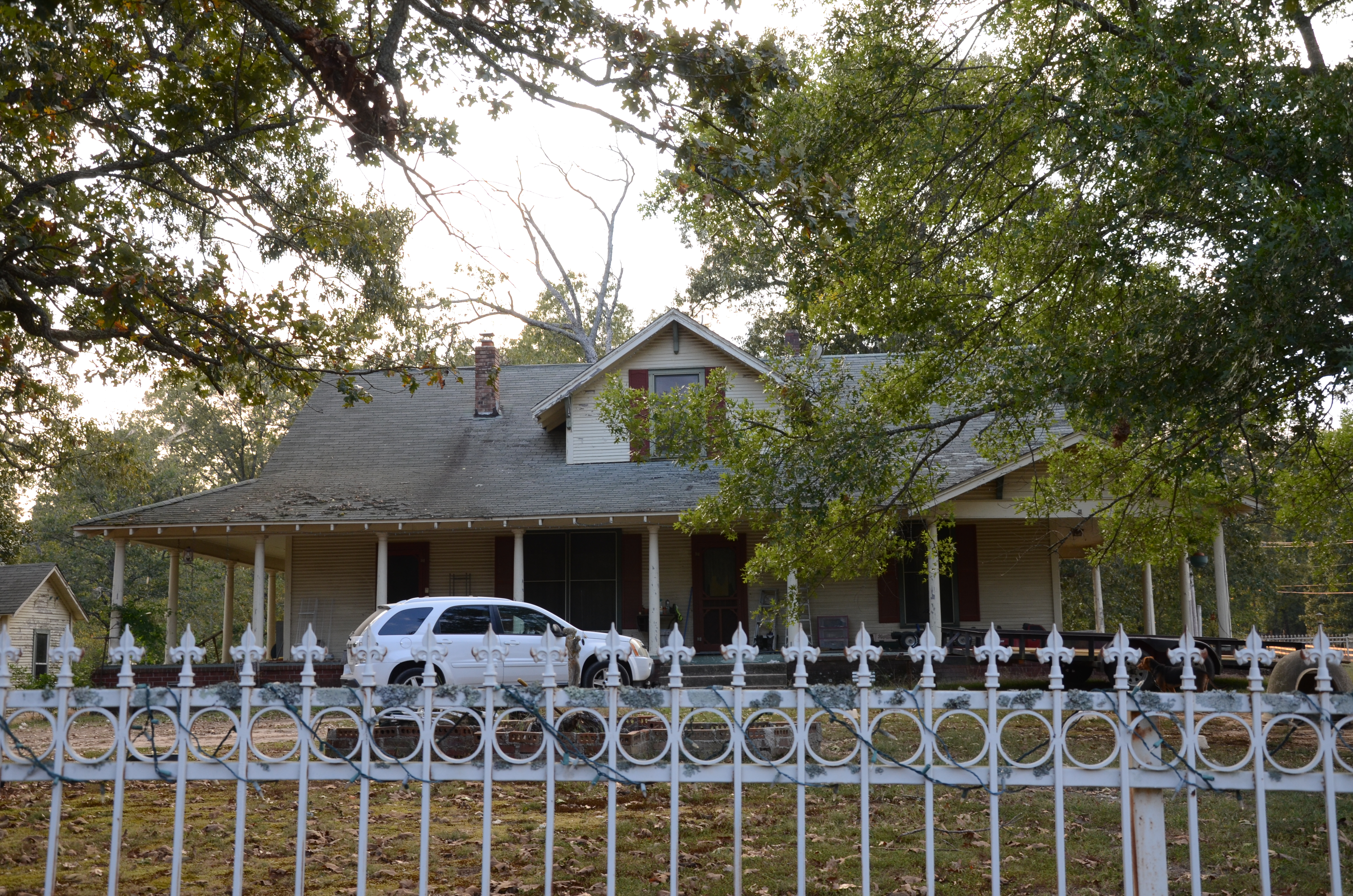

- Location within Arkansas Location within the United States
- Nearest city: Bald Knob, Arkansas
- Coordinates: 35°21′14″N 91°37′10″W
- Area: less than one acre
- Architect: Jim Wright
- Architectural style: Bungalow/craftsman
- MPS: White County MPS
- NRHP reference No.: 91001284
- Added to NRHP: September 5, 1991

The Jim Wright Farmstead Historic District encompasses a well-preserved early 20th-century farmstead in rural White County, Arkansas. The property is located on the south side of Arkansas Highway 258, east of its junction with Arkansas Highway 323, northwest of Bald Knob. It includes a Craftsman style single-story wood-frame farmhouse, with a wraparound porch supported by simple Doric columns, a simple wood-frame garage, and a single-story wood-frame house for tenant workers. It also includes remnants of the farmstead's first house and barn, silo, and a cattle dipping vat. This land was homesteaded in 1860 by the parents of Jim Wright, who is credited with construction of most of the farmstead's surviving features, which were built between 1924 and 1940.

The farmstead was listed on the National Register of Historic Places in 1991.

== See also ==
- National Register of Historic Places listings in White County, Arkansas
