= Vega v. Tekoh =

- Supreme Court of the United States

Argued April 20, 2022 Decided June 23, 2022
- Full case name: Carlos Vega v. Terence Tekoh
- Docket no.: 21-499
- Citations: 597 U.S. 134 (more) 2022 WL 2251304; 2022 U.S. LEXIS 3053
- Argument: Oral argument
- Decision: Opinion

Holding
- A Miranda violation does not provide a basis for a Section 1983 claim.

Court membership
- Chief Justice John Roberts Associate Justices Clarence Thomas · Stephen Breyer; Samuel Alito · Sonia Sotomayor; Elena Kagan · Neil Gorsuch; Brett Kavanaugh · Amy Coney Barrett

Case opinions
- Majority: Alito, joined by Roberts, Thomas, Gorsuch, Kavanaugh, Barrett
- Dissent: Kagan, joined by Breyer, Sotomayor

Laws applied
- U.S. Const. amend. V

Vega v. Tekoh, 597 U.S. 134 (2022), was a United States Supreme Court case in which the Court held, 6–3, that an officer's failure to read Miranda warnings to a suspect in custody does not alone provide basis for a claim of civil liability under Section 1983 of United States Code. In the case, the Court reviewed its previous holding of Miranda v. Arizona (1966) to determine whether respondent Carlos Vega violated plaintiff Terence Tekoh's constitutional rights by failing to read Tekoh his Miranda rights prior to interrogation. Justice Samuel Alito wrote for the six-justice majority that Tekoh's Fifth Amendment rights were not violated, as Miranda rights are "not themselves rights protected by the Constitution."

== Background ==
In the United States, Miranda warnings were established from the Supreme Court case Miranda v. Arizona and upheld in Dickerson v. United States, establishing that under the Fifth Amendment to the United States Constitution, statements made by a suspect while both in police custody and directly being questioned cannot be used as evidence in trial unless they were notified of their right to remain silent prior to questioning.

In March 2014, Los Angeles County Sheriff's Department deputy Carlos Vega responded to a 911 call related to allegations that Terence Tekoh, a hospital employee, had sexually assaulted a patient. Tekoh confessed to the sexual assault shortly after Vega met him. He was tried on the sexual assault allegations and ultimately acquitted. Tekoh then sued Vega under 42 U.S.C. § 1983, asserting he violated his rights under Miranda v. Arizona by not warning him of his right to remain silent.

A federal district court jury found in favor of Vega based on the district court’s jury instructions regarding Miranda. Tekoh appealed, and the United States Court of Appeals for the Ninth Circuit reversed and remanded for another trial. The court denied rehearing en banc over the dissent of Judge Patrick J. Bumatay, who was joined by six other judges. Vega filed a petition for a writ of certiorari.

== Supreme Court ==
Certiorari was granted in the case on January 14, 2022. Oral arguments were heard on April 20, 2022. On June 23, 2022, the Supreme Court reversed the Ninth Circuit in a 6–3 vote. Justice Samuel Alito wrote the majority, while Justice Elena Kagan wrote the dissent.

=== Opinion of the Court ===
In his opinion, Justice Alito wrote that Miranda does not extend to claims made under 42 U.S.C. § 1983. He wrote that a violation of Miranda does not constitute a violation of the fifth amendment to the United States Constitution, as the rules set in Miranda are "prophylactic", he reiterated that the Miranda warnings were "not themselves rights protected by the Constitution".

Alito goes on to describe various previous cases where non-Mirandized statements were deemed to be admissible at trial, such as for impeachment purposes, un-Mirandized questioning during an ongoing emergency, or as the fruits of an un-Mirandized statement. Alito suggests that if this new theory of § 1983 were accepted, it would be, "...hard to see how these decisions could stand..." suggesting this theory conflicts with precedent.

Alito states that it was clear that, "Miranda did not hold that a violation of the rules it established necessarily constitute a Fifth Amendment violation, and it is difficult to see how it could have held otherwise." The Court found no precedent suggesting that a Miranda violation "necessarily constitute[s]" a constitutional violation, and the Court held that a Miranda violation alone could not constitute the "deprivation of [a] right ... secured by the Constitution" under § 1983. The Court declined to expand the law of Miranda to include a claim under § 1983 based on a cost-benefit analysis.

Therefore, the majority saw no reason to extend the right to sue under § 1983.

=== Dissenting opinion ===
In her dissent, Justice Kagan wrote that the majority opinion fails to give "redress" to individuals whose rights were violated by the police under Miranda. She noted that Miranda is "secured by the Constitution" and cited Dickerson v. United States as a reason. She wrote that Dickerson stated that "Miranda has all the substance of a constitutional rule" and that these "constitutional rules are enforceable in federal-court habeas proceedings, where a prisoner is entitled to claim he 'is in custody in violation of the Constitution.'" She contends that under Miranda if the accused had an "un-Mirandized" testimony, it should not be included in the trial, and since that was not the case, that gives the accused grounds to sue under §1983. She ended her dissent with a scathing statement: "The majority here, as elsewhere, injures the right by denying the remedy."
