= Milt Gooden House =

Historic house in Arkansas, United States

- U.S. National Register of Historic Places
- Location within Arkansas Location within the United States
- Nearest city: Bald Knob, Arkansas
- Coordinates: 35°15′15″N 91°32′10″W
- Area: less than one acre
- Built: 1921
- Architectural style: Vernacular double-pen
- MPS: White County MPS
- NRHP reference No.: 91001281
- Added to NRHP: July 13, 1992

The Milt Gooden House was a historic house in rural White County, Arkansas. It was located on the west side of County Road 83, about 0.5 miles (0.80 km) south of its junction with County Road 205, southeast of Bald Knob. It was a single-story double-pen structure, built out of wood framing, and was finished with a side gable roof and board-and-batten siding. A porch extended across its front (eastern) facade, supported by simple square posts. The house was built about 1921, and was a well-preserved example of period vernacular architecture.

The house was listed on the National Register of Historic Places in 1992. It has been listed as destroyed in the Arkansas Historic Preservation Program database.

== See also ==
- National Register of Historic Places listings in White County, Arkansas
