= Sam Cooley Barn =

- U.S. National Register of Historic Places
- Location within Arkansas Location within the United States
- Nearest city: Bald Knob, Arkansas
- Coordinates: 35°17′41″N 91°32′53″W
- Area: less than one acre
- Built: 1920
- Architectural style: Plain traditional
- MPS: White County MPS
- NRHP reference No.: 91001282
- Added to NRHP: July 11, 1992

The Sam Cooley Barn is a historic barn, located just outside Bald Knob, Arkansas south of Collins Road. It is a two-story frame structure in a transverse crib configuration, with a metal roof, vertical board walls, and a stone pier foundation. Its main drive is oriented east–west, with the main vehicle entrance on the west, topped by a sliding door at the second level to allow tall equipment into the barn, and an animal entrance on the north side. Built about 1920, it is one of the best-preserved barns of that period in White County.

The barn was listed on the National Register of Historic Places in 1992.

== See also ==
- National Register of Historic Places listings in White County, Arkansas
