= Elm Street House =

Historic house in Arkansas, United States

- U.S. National Register of Historic Places
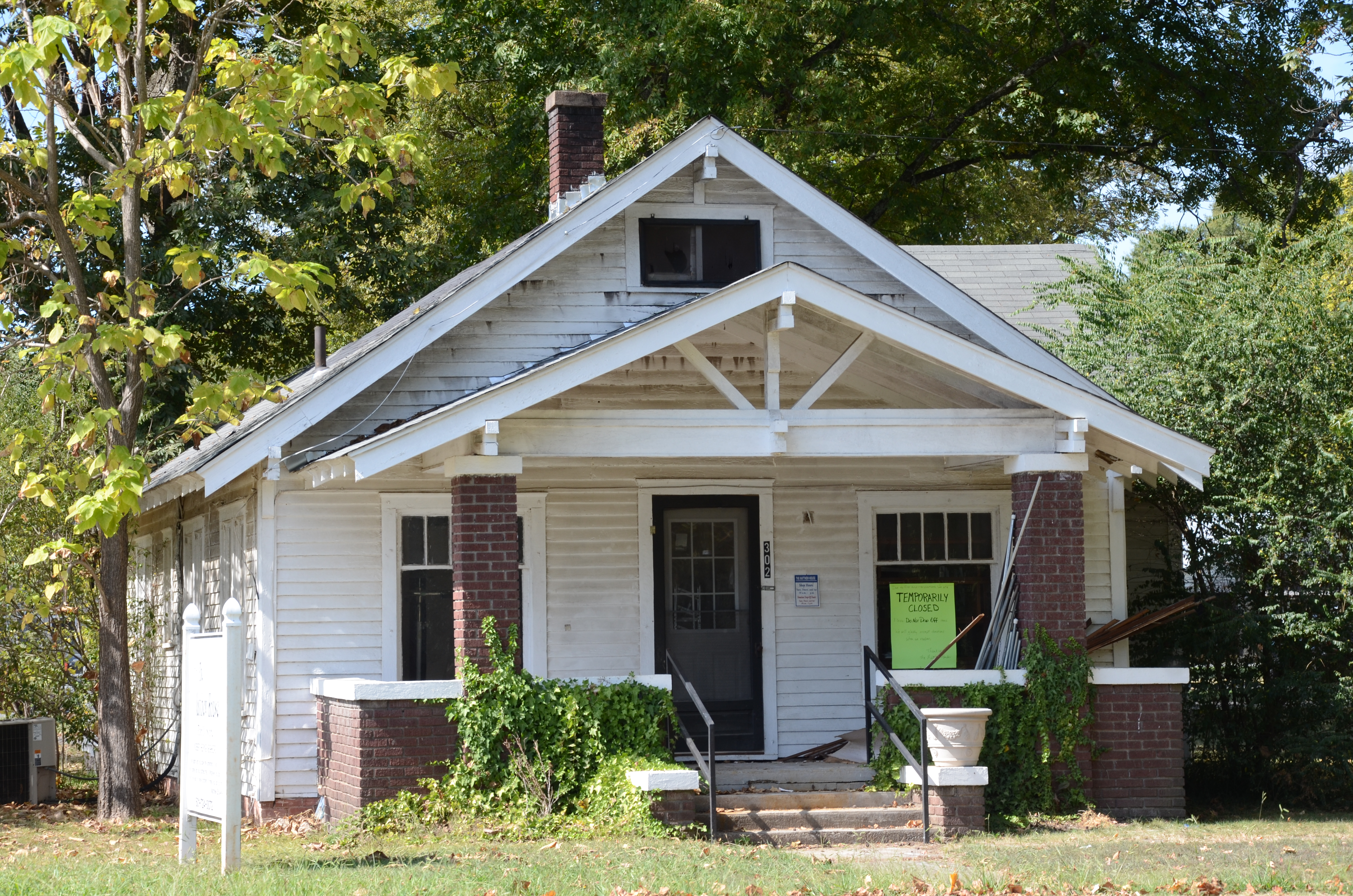

- Location within Arkansas Location within the United States
- Location: Elm St., Bald Knob, Arkansas
- Coordinates: 35°18′37″N 91°34′7″W
- Area: less than one acre
- Built: 1925
- Architectural style: Bungalow/craftsman
- MPS: White County MPS
- NRHP reference No.: 91001269
- Added to NRHP: September 13, 1991

The Elm Street House is a historic house on Elm Street in Bald Knob, Arkansas. It is a single-story wood-frame structure, with an irregular plan that has intersecting gabled roof elements. It is finished in weatherboard and rests on a brick foundation. It has Craftsman features, including exposed rafter ends on the eaves and porch, and brick piers supporting the gabled front porch. Built about 1925, it is one of White County's best preserved examples of Craftsman architecture.

The house was listed on the National Register of Historic Places in 1991.

== See also ==
- National Register of Historic Places listings in White County, Arkansas
