= Miranda's Victim =

2023 film by Michelle Danner

- Theatrical release poster
- Directed by: Michelle Danner
- Screenplay by: J. Craig Stiles
- Story by: George Kolber; Richard Lasser; J. Craig Stiles
- Produced by: George Kolber; Valerie Debler; Alexandra Guarnieri; Michelle Danner; Brian Drillinger
- Starring: Abigail Breslin; Ryan Phillippe; Luke Wilson; Emily VanCamp; Sebastian Quinn; Andy Garcia; Mireille Enos; Enrique Murciano; Josh Bowman; Brent Sexton; Taryn Manning; Kyle MacLachlan; Donald Sutherland
- Cinematography: Pierluigi Malavasi
- Edited by: Teferi Seifu
- Music by: Holly Amber Church
- Production company: Navesink River Productions
- Distributed by: Vertical Entertainment
- Release dates: February 8, 2023 (Santa Barbara); October 6, 2023
- Running time: 127 minutes
- Country: United States
- Language: English

Miranda's Victim is a 2023 American period drama film directed by Michelle Danner and starring Abigail Breslin, Luke Wilson, Kyle MacLachlan, Ryan Phillippe, Mireille Enos, Emily VanCamp, Andy Garcia, and Donald Sutherland.

The film is based on the life of Patricia "Trish" Weir, who was kidnapped and raped by Ernesto Miranda in 1963. The film also depicts the origin of the Miranda warning.

It was released by Vertical Entertainment in the United States on October 6, 2023.

== Plot ==
In June 1966, new mother and wife Trish Weir is shocked the Supreme Court has passed the Miranda Ruling, making evidence gleaned from a criminal suspect without reading them the 'Miranda warning' inadmissible in court.

Three years earlier, the introverted 18-year-old Trish was planning the future with her mother Zeola driving to work at the cinema. At the concession stand, the projectionist Jimmy suggests they head home together on the late bus. There, before Trish gets off the bus, they organize to meet up before work on Saturday.

Hours later, a traumatised and distraught Trish arrives home. Her initially scolding big sister Ann, realising something serious has happened, drives her to the doctor's at 4 a.m. to find evidence of rape.

On their return Trish goes to bed, while Ann informs Zeola and her husband Paul of what she understood from the shocked teen. Zeola laments the loss of Trish's purity, rather than showing empathy. Worrying Trish may not be accepted into secretarial school, Zeola insists the police will not believe her.

In the morning, Zeola offers Trish possible 'solutions' to the incident, including forcing the culprit to marry her, but at least not filing a police report. Appalled, Trish insists she has to help stop him, but her mother believes justice will not prevail and she will be considered damaged goods.

In the police station the next day, the Weirs respond differently, Zeola trying to convince Trish to not file charges, Ann firmly supporting Trish and Trish wanting to prevent the man from raping others. As she is trying to explain the details of the incident, Zeola constantly interjects.

Trish got off the bus at midnight. On the walk home, the perpetrator forced her into his sedan's back seat, tying her hands. Driving 20 minutes into the desert, he pulled over, beat her savagely, and raped her at knifepoint. He then told her "If I can't have you, nobody will."

After a week, Trish returns to work. Trying to talk to Jimmy, he avoids her, likely due to the police questioning. When Paul is waiting for her by the bus stop, a sedan pulls up nearby. So, he gets the plate number.

Tracking down a sedan with nearly the same plate in the area registered to Twila Hoffman, detectives go to her address. Seeing rope in the back and her partner Ernesto Miranda fitting the description, they persuade him to go down to the station. There, he participates in a lineup, as he has a record.

Both Trish and recently engaged Barbara identify Ernesto as their assailant, although only Trish for rape. She asks to see him in glasses and to hear his voice, which help her confirm. The police then get Ernesto to confess, write it down and sign it.

At the 1963 trial, Trish confirms Ernesto was the rapist. Although the defense tries to cast doubt on her testimony, the jury finds him guilty. Trish later marries Charles and has her baby. Ernesto loses an appeal to the Arizona Supreme Court, so ACLU lawyer John Flynn takes the case to the SCOTUS, which grants a retrial in 1967.

Hearing of the upcoming trial Twila, who cut ties with Ernesto and reconciled with her former husband, offers to testify against him, as whatever they had gleaned from him after the lineup is inadmissible. When Prosecutor Lawrence Turoff asks Trish to testify again, she is hesitant as Charles is controlling. He loses his temper with Trish upon discovering Turoff's visit.

Charles goes on a bender, gets pulled over for DWI and taken into the station. Turoff sits him down and explains that Trish is the only one of several victims brave enough to press charges. At the trial start, Judge Wren reminds the press they cannot divulge the complainant's identity.

Twila's testimony is key to the prosecution and admissible, as they were never married. Twila attests that Ernesto confessed the rape to her on a prison visit. Returning to the stand, Trish affirms she had been penetrated by a penis, having now been married three years and declares she feared for her life when it occurred.

Judge Wren and the jury find Miranda guilty as charged. Paroled after eight years, he earns money by selling his signature on copies of the Miranda Warning. Ernesto met his demise during an evening poker game.

== Cast ==
- Abigail Breslin as Trish Weir
- Luke Wilson as Lawrence Turoff
- Andy García as Alvin Moore
- Donald Sutherland as Judge Laurance T. Wren
- Ryan Phillippe as John J. Flynn
- Kyle MacLachlan as Chief Justice Earl Warren
- Mireille Enos as Zeola
- Taryn Manning as Twila Hoffman
- Emily VanCamp as Ann Weir
- Sebastian Quinn as Ernesto Miranda
- Enrique Murciano as Detective Cooley
- Brent Sexton as Sergeant Nealis
- Nolan Gould as James Valenti
- Josh Bowman as Charles
- Dan Lauria as Dr. Crawford

== Production ==
In May 2022, it was announced that Breslin, Wilson, Sutherland and Garcia were cast in the film. In June 2022, it was announced that Phillippe, MacLachlan, Enos and Manning were added to the cast.

Filming began in New Jersey in June 2022. The film was shot in Middletown Township, New Jersey, Red Bank, New Jersey and at Monmouth University.

== Release ==
Miranda's Victim had its world premiere at the Santa Barbara International Film Festival on Wednesday, February 8, 2023 at the Arlington Theatre in Santa Barbara, California. It was released by Vertical Entertainment on October 6, 2023.

== Reception ==
=== Critical response ===
On the review aggregator website Rotten Tomatoes, 81% of 27 critics' reviews are positive, with an average rating of 7.0/10. The website's consensus reads: "Brought to life by a stellar cast, Miranda's Victim has a powerful message, albeit one that's occasionally undermined by its blunt approach to the issues."

Phil Hoad of The Guardian gave the film 4 out of 5 stars and stated, "Danner essentially pits the rights of the suspect and the victim in a tug of war for the film's centre ground." Hoad also wrote, "It is meatily performed across the entire ensemble, with the curt and resolute Breslin selflessly letting the legal eagles fly high."

Donald Liebenson of RogerEbert.com opined, "The script sometimes wields a heavy expository hand" and "The distinguished cast is uninformedly excellent in a film they clearly did not do for the money (one of the joys of the endangered mid-budget film)."

Patrice Witherspoon of Screen Rant noted, "Crucially, Danner gives her actors the space to excel in every moment, giving us a compelling final product that is worth the watch. Abigail Breslin certifies her talent with every tear shed while giving an equally amazing physical performance. Ryan Phillippe also returns to form with his cutthroat approach to his character John Flynn."

Olly Dyche of MovieWeb stated, "It sports an exceptional cast grounded by a fantastic performance from Abigail Breslin, as well as some gripping writing that will keep audiences hooked. Its production design is incredibly immersive, seamlessly sending audiences back in time to the '60s."

John Serba of Decider described Miranda's Victim as "a thoroughly absorbing film that ably dramatizes thorny political-personal entanglements." Serba also remarked, "Its intent is pure and its foundational performances – from Breslin, Wilson, Enos, Quinn, VanCamp – are rock-solid."
