= Phoenix Police Department =

Law enforcement agency in Arizona, US

- Patch of the Phoenix Police

- Phoenix Police officer badge
- Abbreviation: PHXPD
- Motto: We will serve, protect and reduce crime in Phoenix while treating everyone with dignity and respect.

Agency overview
- Formed: 1881
- Preceding agency: Phoenix City Marshal
- Annual budget: $731 million (2024)

Jurisdictional structure
- Operations jurisdiction: Phoenix, Arizona, US
- Map of Phoenix Police Department's jurisdiction
- Area: 516 sq mi (1,340 km^{2}).
- Population: 1.64 million
- Legal jurisdiction: City of Phoenix
- General nature: Local civilian police

Operational structure
- Headquarters: 100 West Washington
- Officers: Around 2,534
- Elected officer responsible: Kate Gallego, Mayor of Phoenix
- Agency executives: Matthew Giordano, Chief of Police; Dennis Orender, Executive Assistant Chief; Ed DeCastro, Assistant Chief; Sean Kennedy, Assistant Chief; Jeffrey Benza, Assistant Chief; Brian Lee, Assistant Chief
- Divisions: 6: Support Services Division; Patrol Division; Management Services Division; Strategic Services Division; Reserve Division; Investigations Division
- Bureaus: 23: Fiscal Management Bureau; Planning and Research Bureau; Professional Standards Bureau; Employment Services Bureau; Training Bureau; Airport Bureau; Homeland Defense Bureau; Transit Bureau; Major Offender Bureau; Traffic Bureau; Community Relations Bureau; Tactical Support Bureau; Drug Enforcement Bureau; Family Investigations Bureau; Property Crimes Bureau; Public Affairs Bureau; Violent Crimes Bureau; Communications Bureau; Information Technology Bureau; Laboratory Services Bureau; Records and Identifications Bureau; Property Management Bureau; Reserve Bureau

Facilities
- Precincts: 8: 200 – Black Mountain Precinct; 300 – Estrella Mountain Precinct; 400 – South Mountain Precinct; 500 – Central City Precinct; 600 – Desert Horizon Precinct; 700 – Mountain View Precinct; 800 – Maryvale Precinct; 900 – Cactus Park Precinct
- Airbases: Deer Valley Airport
- Helicopters: 9
- Airplanes: 3

Website
- phoenix.gov/POLICE

The Phoenix Police Department is the law enforcement agency responsible for the city of Phoenix, Arizona. As of May 2024, the Phoenix Police Department comprises just over 2,500 officers, some 625 below authorized strength of 3,125 and more than 1,000 support personnel. The department serves a population of more than 1.64 million and patrol almost 516 square miles (1,340 km^{2}) of the fifth largest city in the United States.

The United States Department of Justice have documented a pattern of excessive force, discrimination against Black, Hispanic, and Native American people, and other misconduct within Phoenix Police Department.

== History ==
Phoenix was incorporated as a city on February 5, 1881. Law enforcement was handled by Phoenix city marshals and later by Phoenix police officers. Henry Garfias, the first city marshal, was elected by residents in 1881 in the first elections of the newly incorporated city. For six years, he served as the primary law enforcement officer.

In the early 1900s, the Phoenix Police Department used Old Nelly, the horse, to pull the patrol wagon for officers. Most patrolling, however, was done on foot. The city at this time was only 3.1 square miles (8.0 km^{2}) with a population of 11,134 people. Call boxes were used to notify an officer that headquarters wanted him. These were supplemented by a system of horns and flashing lights.

The first death of a Phoenix police officer in the line of duty in Phoenix occurred on February 5, 1925. Officer Haze Burch was shot and killed by two brothers on the run from authorities. The men were later arrested when they were found hiding at the Tempe Buttes.

In 1929, patrolmen worked six days a week and were paid $100 a month. The police department moved into the west section of the new city-county building at 17 South 2nd Avenue. The building included jail cells on the top two floors. In 1933, Ruth Meicher joined the police department as the first female jail matron. The city at this time was only 6.4 square miles (17 km^{2}), with a population of 48,200. In the year prior, the first police radio system in Arizona was installed for the department with the call letters KGZJ.

The department reorganized in 1950 with four divisions, Traffic, Detectives, Patrol and Service Divisions. Officers worked 44 hours per week for $288 per month. In 1974, the Air patrol unit was established initially consisting of one helicopter. A few months later, a fixed wing aircraft and two additional helicopters were added.

In 2008, the department formed the Block Watch program, which is a partnership between citizens and the police department to help deter youth from crime. The department also runs a similar program under the name G.A.I.N. which stands for Getting Arizona Involved in Neighborhoods.

Phoenix police officers shot at least 41 people in 2018, the highest number in the department's history and the highest number of any U.S. city that year, killing at least 19 people. Of those shot, demographically, Native Americans were the most over-represented group for their population size, while Hispanics—who comprise 43 percent of the city's population—were shot most often overall.

In 2018, the city budget allocated funding for 3,125 officers, but as of May 2024, the department had just over 2,500 officers, many of whom are eligible to retire. As of 2024, PPD received 41 percent of funds allocated in the city's general fund budget.

As of 2020, Phoenix has one of the highest rates of police killings in the United States. Civil rights leaders and community activists have argued that the city's police officers are rarely held accountable for using lethal force and making false statements.

On August 5, 2021, the Department of Justice (DOJ) announced an investigation into the Phoenix Police Department and the City of Phoenix. In June 2024, the DOJ concluded its investigation, finding that the Phoenix Police Department routinely discriminates against people of color and uses excessive force, including unjustified deadly force. Under the Trump administration, all police reform actions were frozen by the DOJ, including a potential federal oversight of the Phoenix Police Department.

In January 2024, an audit determined Officer Kenneth Vine Jr. had earned $40,000 that month.

=== Controversies ===
- On March 13, 1963, Phoenix Police officers Carroll Cooley and Wilfred Young arrested Ernesto Miranda for kidnapping, rape, and armed robbery. The department got a written confession by Miranda, after interrogation, without informing him of his rights. This led to the landmark U.S. Supreme Court case Miranda v. Arizona, as well as the creation of the "Miranda Rights."
- On October 5, 2010, Phoenix Police officer Richard Chrisman, responding to a domestic disturbance call, entered a mobile home and killed an unarmed man during a confrontation. Chrisman was convicted of second degree murder and sentenced to prison.
- In August 2011, Officer Jeffrey Gordon was suspended from his job for four days for touching a female city worker inappropriately. The incident received attention in the press as the policeman was the son of Mayor Phil Gordon.
- In September 2011, Officer Jason A. Brooks beat a handcuffed suspect. He resigned from the department and in July 2012 pleaded guilty to a single charge of disorderly conduct and was sentenced to a day on parole.
- In July 2012, press reports indicated that Sergeant Arnold Davis was caught on a video camera stealing thousands of dollars from a business while he was there on official business. Davis, represented by a lawyer from the Phoenix Police Sergeants and Lieutenants Association began negotiating an early retirement to avoid criminal charges.
- In August 2012, Detective Christopher J. Wilson resigned from the department when he was accused of ten counts of sex with underaged boys. Wilson pleaded not guilty to the charges.
- In December 2012, Detective George Contreras pleaded no contest to a misdemeanor charge that he made false reports concerning after-hours security work for which he was paid, but that he never performed. He was ordered to pay over $6,000 to groups he had defrauded. Contreras resigned from the department before his court appearance.
- In December 2014, Phoenix Police Officer Mark Rine shot Rumain Brisbon twice in a parking garage while Brisbon was trying to pick up food for his family. Brisbon died as a result. Brisbon was unarmed and witnesses explained that Rine had not stated any reason as to why he stopped Brisbon. The two men entered a physical altercation, and Rine stated he shot Brisbon because he felt a weapon tucked in his waistband. The City of Phoenix settled with Brison's family for $1.5 million in 2017.
- At a protest in August 2017 against a Donald Trump rally, Phoenix Police Officer Christopher Turiano shot a protester in the groin with a rubber bullet. The department's Tactical Response Unit, of which Turiano is a member, responded to the shooting by creating a commemorative challenge coin with a depiction of a protester being shot in the groin on one side and Trump's "Make America Great Again" slogan on the other side. Then Phoenix Police Chief Jeri Williams was aware of the coins but did not discipline the officers involved.
- In 2018, the Phoenix Police Department reported shooting 44 people, more than the number of people shot that year by the LAPD or NYPD. While only 23 of these were fatal, this number was higher than any past year for the department. Additional information from the report details that black and Native American people made up a disproportionate number of the people shot by Phoenix Police Department in 2018. In March 2018, Arizona police officers shot 17 people statewide.
- On May 27, 2019, Dravon Ames was removed from his vehicle following a felony stop after failing to yield for police. Once out of his vehicle, a police officer could be seen kicking Ames legs near the rear of his patrol vehicle and verbally accosting him. Police had attempted to stop Ames, who was accused of stealing a toy from a nearby store. In the car at the time were Ames' two young children and his pregnant partner, Iesha Harper, who was threatened by the officer at the scene, when she refused to exit the vehicle and made several furtive movements. It is believed that Ames had stolen underwear and one of the children may have taken the toy from the store. The officer involved was fired, but the family filed a $10 million claim against the Phoenix Police Department for violating their civil rights and later settled for $475,000. Video footage of this arrest and the treatment of Ames and his family made national news.
- In May 2019, Héctor López was shot and killed by Phoenix Police Officers Nick Calandra and Chad Canedy. The officers received a call regarding a complaint of a trespassing, police say upon making contact with López a firearm fell to the ground and López reached to pick up the fallen weapon from outside his vehicle. Police said the two officers fought with Lòpez over the firearm and were unable to gain control and which point Lòpez pointed the firearm at the officers who shot and killed him in response. The death of López led to protests in Phoenix and calls to address police violence within the department. While there is no video footage of this incident, Héctor López' family points to the footage of Phoenix PD's treatment of Dravon Ames and his family as evidence of the lack of respect with which officers treat residents.
- On May 21, 2020, Ryan Whitaker was shot and killed by Phoenix Police officer Jeff Cooke when he answered his apartment door armed with a gun in his hand. Whitaker was not using the gun in a threatening way, but was armed while officers were responding to a domestic violence call and noise complaint at his apartment. While Cooke was eventually fired from the department, no criminal charges were filed against him.
- On July 4, 2020, James Garcia was shot inside his parked car at a friend's house in Phoenix. Officers responded to a call of an aggravated assault and contacted Garcia who was seated in his vehicle. Phoenix PD claimed that Garcia, who was a prohibited possessor, refused to put a weapon down that was aimed at them. Body camera footage, following the shooting, showed an officer reach in and take a firearm out of Garcia's lap. It was also later admitted by officers that Garcia did not match the description of the person that they were searching for at the time of the shooting. Groups of protesters requested the release of information regarding Garcia's death, and the incident underwent a long and thorough investigation. Chief Jeri Williams was pressured to respond and act to the indecent as it came during the George Floyd protests. Garcia's family filed a claim against the city for $10 million.
- In January 2021, the Phoenix Police Department reported shooting at least 25 people in 2020. In January 2022, the department reported shooting 13 people in 2021. Information about the department's officer involved shootings was later added to an online tracking system in an attempt to provide transparency to the community.
- On August 5, 2021, the United States Department of Justice's Office of Public Affairs announced an investigation into the Phoenix Police Department. The investigation looks into the use of deadly force as well as allegations of the department's use of retaliatory action, among other things. The goal of the investigation is to look into police shootings and other controversies within the department and to ensure that those living in Phoenix feel that the department is living up to its promises, policies, procedures, and the law. Starting in 2017, the Phoenix Police Department has been involved with police officer involved shootings at higher rates than other large cities around the country. Further investigation into why this is and how the department could make changes to remedy this have been talked about, but not yet completed. In June 2024, after a three-year investigation, the DOJ released a report that found "pervasive failings" on the part of the Phoenix Police Department, concluding that there was a "pattern or practice" of the Phoenix Police Department using excessive force, including unjustified deadly force, and discriminating against Black, Hispanic, and Native American people. The report also found that the department unlawfully detains homeless people and disposes of their belongings, which is the first such finding against a police department in the United States.

== Structure ==
The Phoenix Police Department is divided into six divisions: Community and Support Services, Investigations, Management Services, Patrol, Reserve, Strategic and Tactical Services.

== Leadership ==
On September 12, 2022, Michael Sullivan took over as interim Police Chief of the Phoenix Police Department following the departure of former Chief Jeri Williams. Sullivan began his career in law enforcement with the Louisville Metro Police Department. In 2019, he joined the Baltimore Police Department as Deputy Commissioner. Where he served in the Operations Bureau as well as led BPD's reform efforts and brought the agency into initial compliance with a number of the mandates of its Federal Consent Decree.

=== Patrol Division ===
The Phoenix Police Department Patrol Division is organized into seven precincts:

- Desert Horizon precinct covers 74.92 square miles with an approximate population of 311,770 residents. This precinct also runs the Sunnyslope Neighborhood Police Station.
- Black Mountain precinct covers 182 square miles with a population of 224,000 residents.
- Cactus Park precinct covers an area of 30 square miles with a population of 188,000 residents. This precinct also is responsible for the Goelet A.C. Beuf Neighborhood Police Station.
- Mountain View precinct covers an area of 46 square miles with a population of 214,386.
- Central City precinct ty precinct covers 18 square miles with a population of 91,500.
- Maryvale-Estrella Mountain precinct covers 75 square miles with a population of 304,546. Effective October 20, 2014, the Maryvale Precinct and Estrella Mountain Precinct combined to form the Maryvale Estrella Mountain Precinct.
- South Mountain precinct covers 115.0 square miles with a population of 271,785.

=== Community and Support Services Division ===
- Central Booking
- Communications Bureau
- Community Relations Bureau
- Employment Services Bureau
- Information Technology Bureau
- Property Management Bureau
- Strategic Information Bureau
- Training Bureau

=== Investigations Division ===
- Family Investigations Bureau
- Violent Crimes Bureau
- Property Crimes Bureau
- Laboratory Services Bureau
- Drug Enforcement Bureau

=== Strategic and Tactical Services Division ===
- Airport Bureau
- Air Support Unit
- Canine And Specialty Vehicles
- Homeland Defense Bureau
- Special Assignments Unit
- Tactical Support Bureau
- Transportation Bureau

=== Management Services Division ===
- Chiefs Office
- Code Enforcement Unit
- Fiscal management Bureau
- Legal Unit
- Professional Standards Bureau
- Public Affairs Bureau

== Rank structure ==
Phoenix Police Department rank structure
Title	Insignia
Chief of Police	
Executive Assistant Chief	
Assistant Chief	
Commander	
Lieutenant	
Sergeant	
Police Officer	

The position of Executive Assistant Chief is considered second-in-command of the department. The collar rank insignia is indistinguishable from other Assistant Chiefs. However, the title "Executive Assistant Chief" is inscribed in the title scroll on the top of the breast badge to indicate the position.

After ten years in the rank of Sergeant, employees are authorized to add one rocker to the bottom of the sergeant stripes. After fifteen years in rank, two rockers are authorized and after twenty years in the rank of sergeant, three rockers are authorized to be added to the sergeant stripes. There is no associated elevation in actual rank, and no additional pay, as these extra rockers are optional and only meant to distinguish time in the grade and are not a promotion.

The Phoenix Police Department also uses shoulder patches to denote the positions of Sergeant-in-Training and Field Training Officer, although these are not official supervisory ranks.

Title	Insignia
Sergeant-in-Training	
Field Training Officer	

== Resources ==
=== Transportation ===
Phoenix Police Helicopter

The Phoenix Police Department uses Chevrolet Tahoes for their primary patrol vehicles, and Honda ST1300P Motorcycles, Kawasaki 1000 Motorcycles, and Harley-Davidson motorcycles.

=== Aviation ===
The department uses three AgustaWestland A119 helicopters. They also fly five Eurocopter AS350 B3's and an AgustaWestland A109 Power for rescues.

The department also uses a Pilatus PC-12. This aircraft is intended for surveillance, but also serves as a transport. Additionally, the Air Support Unit has three Cessna aircraft; one 1978 182Q, one 1981 172P and a P210R.

=== Firearms ===
Phoenix Police officers are typically armed with a Glock 17 pistol chambered in 9mm. Several other handguns, shotguns, rifles and less than lethal launchers and munitions are also authorized.

== Fallen Officers ==
46 police officers and 7 K9's have died in the line of duty.

Officer	End of Watch	Cause of Death
Officer Haze Burch	February 5, 1925	Gunfire
Officer David Lee "Star" Johnson	May 2, 1944	Gunfire
Officer Walter H. Stewart	February 19, 1952	Vehicular assault
Officer Dale Crist Stone	December 28, 1970	Motorcycle crash
Officer Albert Raymond Bluhm	December 28, 1970	Gunfire
Officer Clay Quincy Haywood	November 22, 1971	Motorcycle crash
Officer Michael D. Hemschmeyer	November 2, 1973	Automobile crash
Officer Gilbert Richard Chavez	November 2, 1973	Gunfire
Police Guard John Franklin MacInnis	June 16, 1975	Heart attack
Officer Arthur Edward Del Gaudio Jr.	April 22, 1976	Vehicle pursuit
Officer Ignacio Gonzales "Nacho" Conchos	July 1, 1982	Gunfire
Officer John R. Davis Sr.	August 6, 1982	Gunfire
Officer Kenneth E. Campbell	January 29, 1984	Vehicle pursuit
Officer Errol C. Hawkins	April 24, 1984	Struck by vehicle
Officer Robert L. Polmanteer	May 4, 1984	Motorcycle crash
Officer Kevin W. Forsythe	September 7, 1984	Struck by vehicle
Officer John A. Robertson	November 19, 1984	Gunfire
Officer Robert T. Fike	January 8, 1986	Gunfire
Officer Kenneth L. Collings	May 27, 1988	Gunfire
Officer Patrick O. Briggs	June 20, 1990	Vehicle pursuit
Sergeant John Wayne Domblisky	July 26, 1990	Vehicular assault
Sergeant Danny L. Tunney	July 26, 1990	Vehicular assault
Officer Leonard Leon Kolodziej	September 4, 1991	Gunfire
Sergeant David Martin Kieffer	May 21, 1997	Vehicular assault
Officer Marc Todd Atkinson	March 26, 1999	Gunfire
Officer Goelet Alessandro Carlo Beuf	November 1, 1999	Assault
Officer Beryl Wayne Scott Jr.	September 10, 2002	Motorcycle crash
Officer Donald Ralph Schultz	May 12, 2004	Drowning
Officer Jason Alan Wolfe	August 28, 2004	Gunfire
Officer Eric James White	August 28, 2004	Gunfire
Officer David Christopher Uribe	May 10, 2005	Gunfire
Officer Paul Robert Salmon	November 29, 2005	Automobile crash
Officer George Valentino Cortez Jr.	July 27, 2007	Gunfire
Officer Nicki James "Nick" Erfle	September 18, 2007	Gunfire
Officer Shane Cory Figueroa	October 25, 2008	Vehicular assault
Officer Travis Paul Murphy	May 26, 2010	Gunfire
Officer Daryl Michael Raetz	May 19, 2013	Struck by vehicle
Detective John Thomas Hobbs	March 3, 2014	Gunfire
Officer David Van Glasser	May 19, 2016	Gunfire
Officer Paul Thomas Rutherford	March 21, 2019	Struck by vehicle
Commander Greg Scott Carnicle	March 29, 2020	Gunfire
Officer Ginarro Allen New	May 31, 2021	Vehicular assault
Officer Mathew Aaron Hefter	August 7, 2021	COVID19
Sergeant Thomas Crawford Craig	September 3, 2021	COVID19
Officer Phillip James Vavrinec Jr.	September 22, 2021	COVID19
Officer Zane Coolidge	September 6, 2024	Gunfire

K9 Officer	End of Watch	Cause of Death
K9 Roscoe	July 13, 1984	Struck by vehicle
K9 Yeager	January 1, 1986	Fall
K9 Dax	October 20, 1994	Gunfire
K9 Hunter	April 17, 1996	Gunfire
K9 R.J.	August 13, 2005	Vehicular assault
K9 Top	March 13, 2007	Heatstroke
K9 Bane	April 17, 2018	Unidentified

== Gallery ==
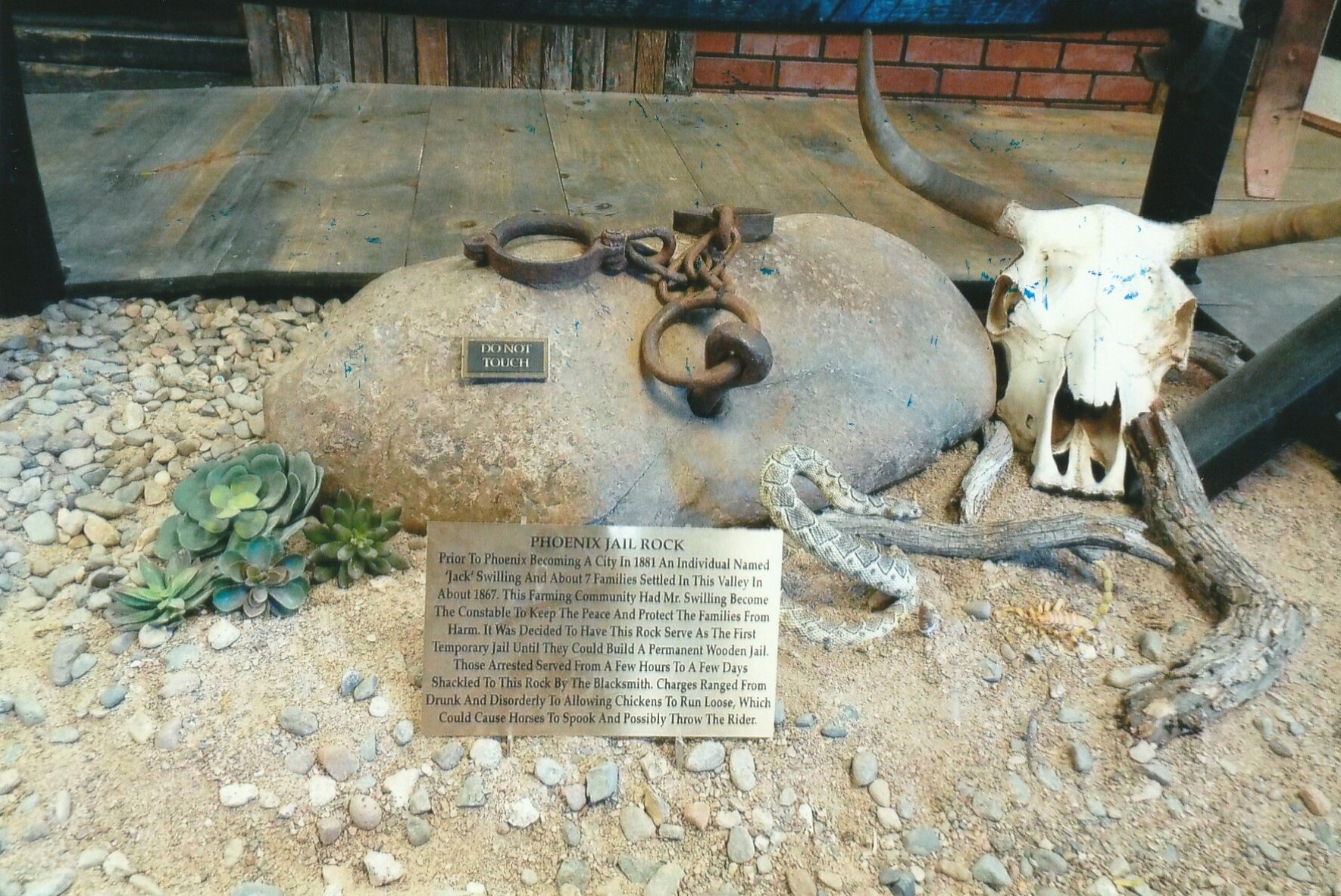
The Jail Rock. Jack Swilling, the founder of Phoenix, was named constable. This river rock was used as a temporary jail before the first wooden jail house was built. It served as a leg iron to shackle prisoners.

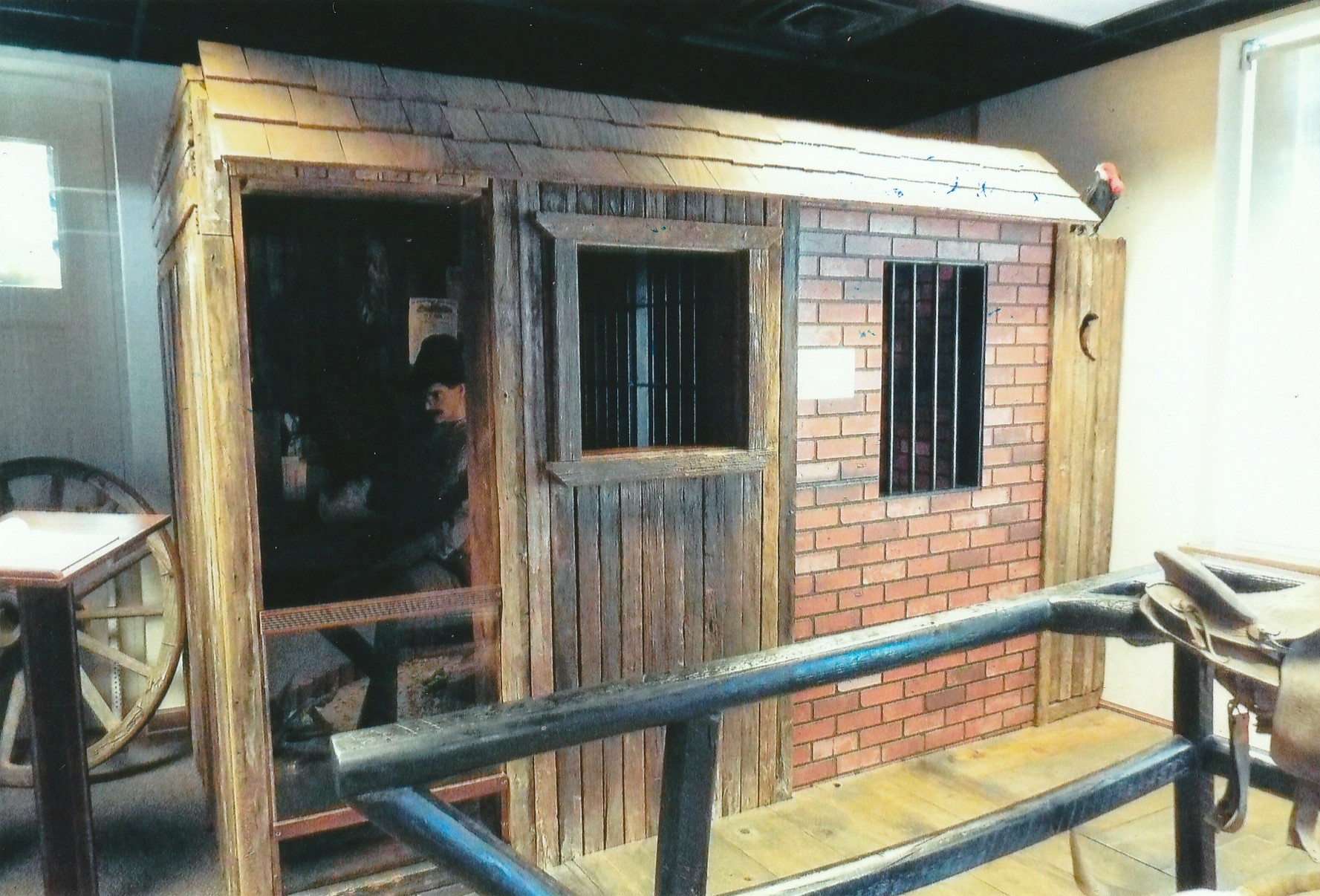
Replica of Sheriff Henry Garfias’ office and jail in Phoenix.

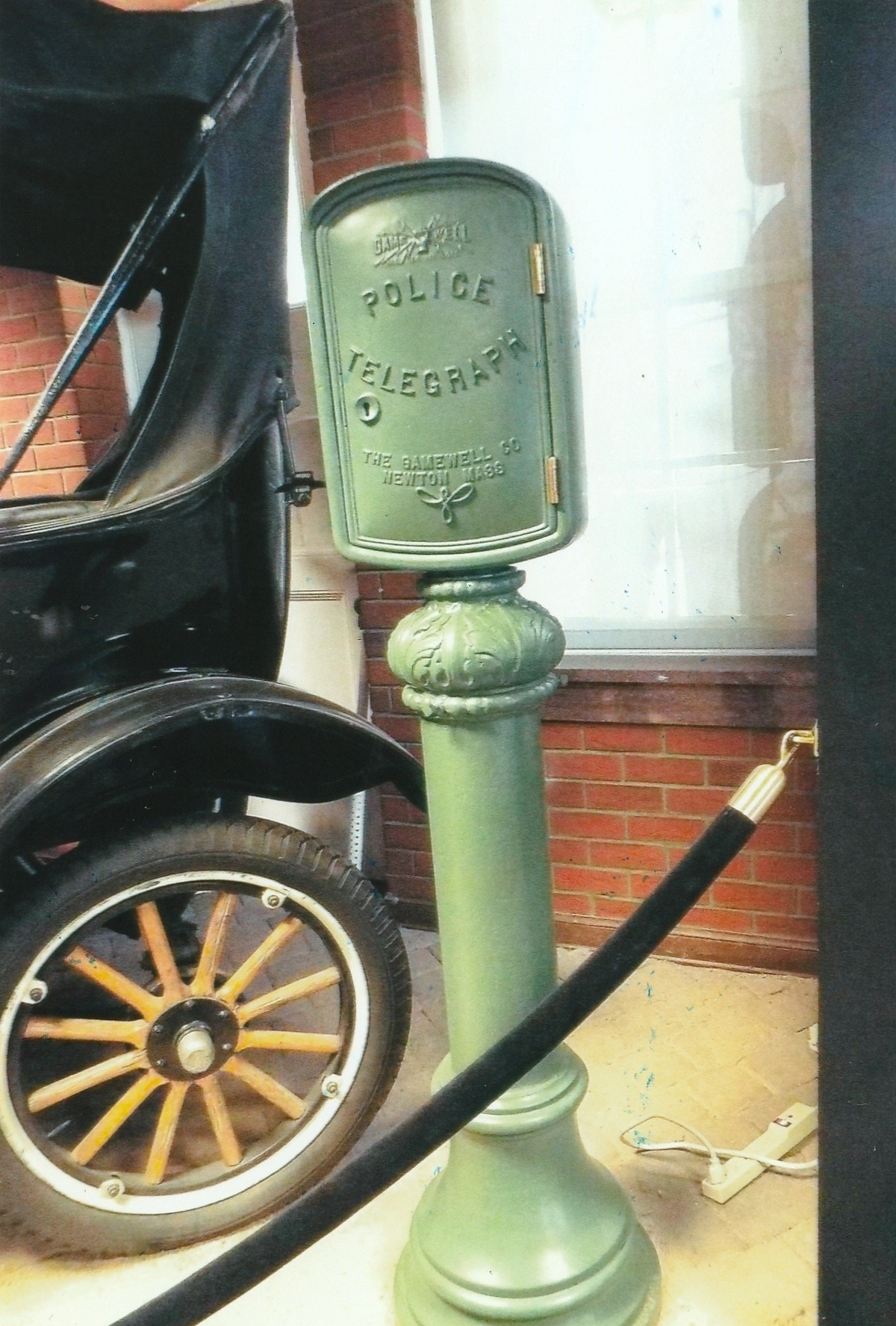
Early Gamewell Co. 1920 Police Telegraph (Call Box). The call boxes were used to notify an officer that headquarters wanted him. These were supplemented by a system of horns and flashing lights.

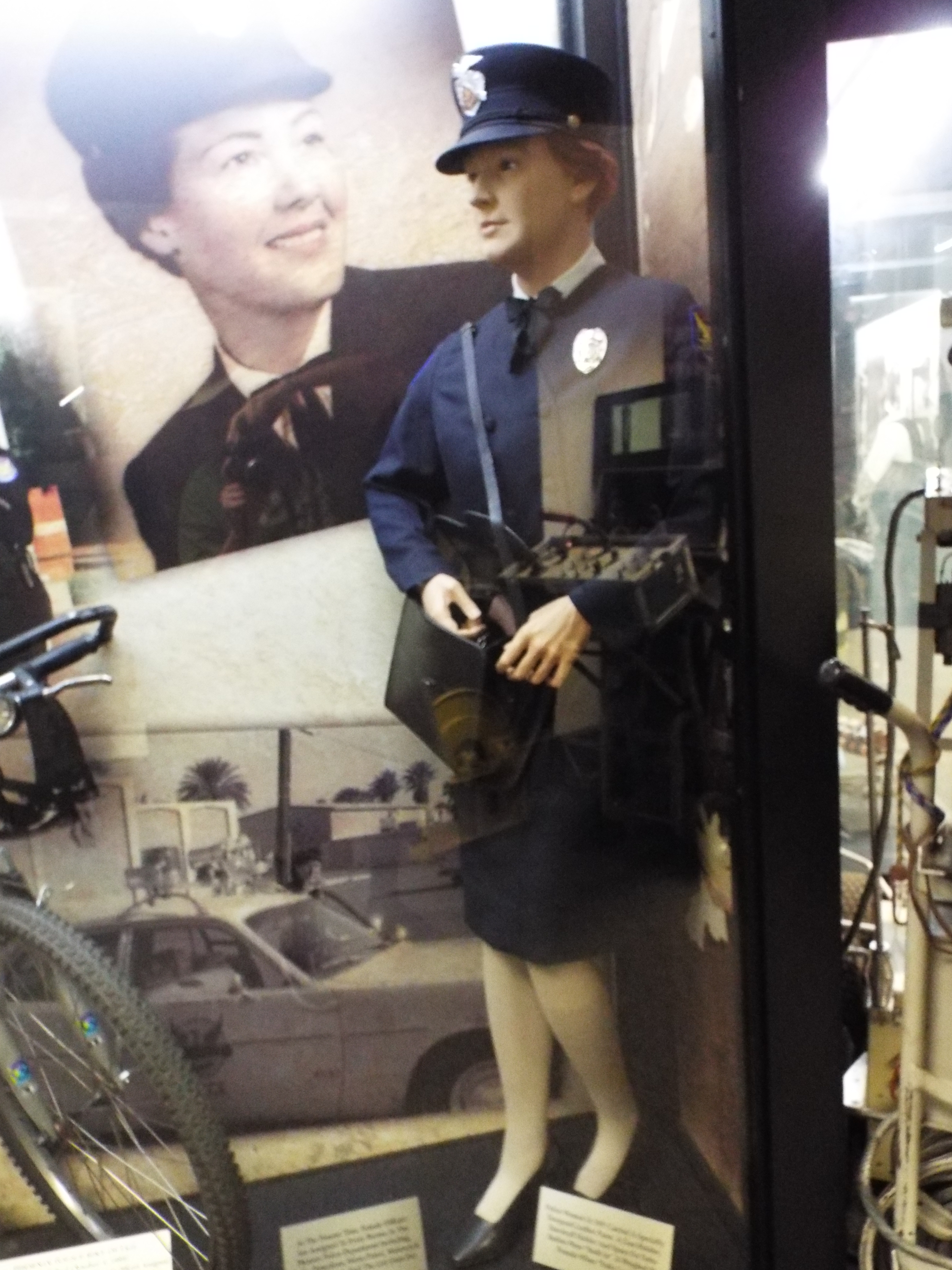
The Women Police Officer exhibit.

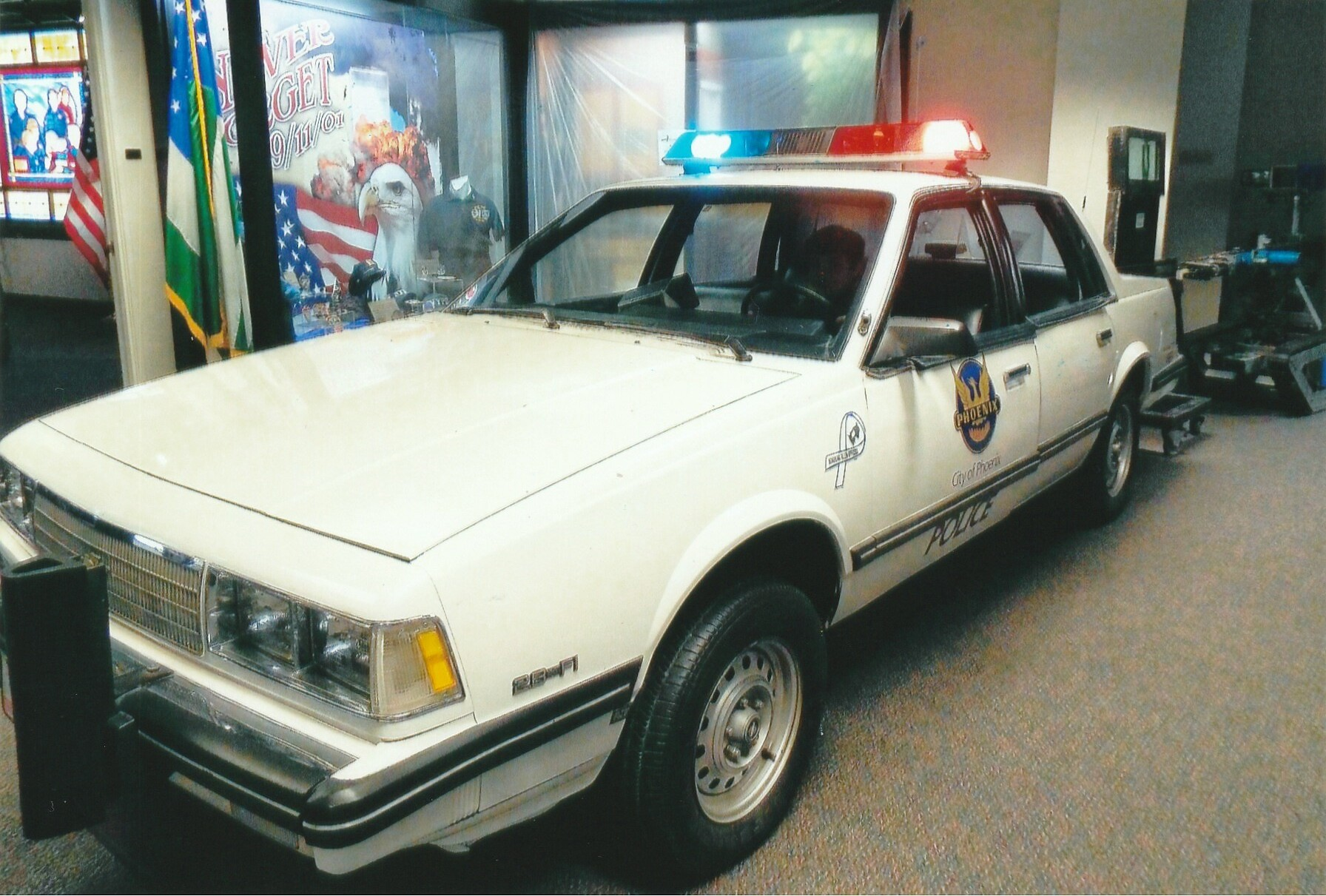
Chevrolet Celebrity Police Cruiser from the 1980s.

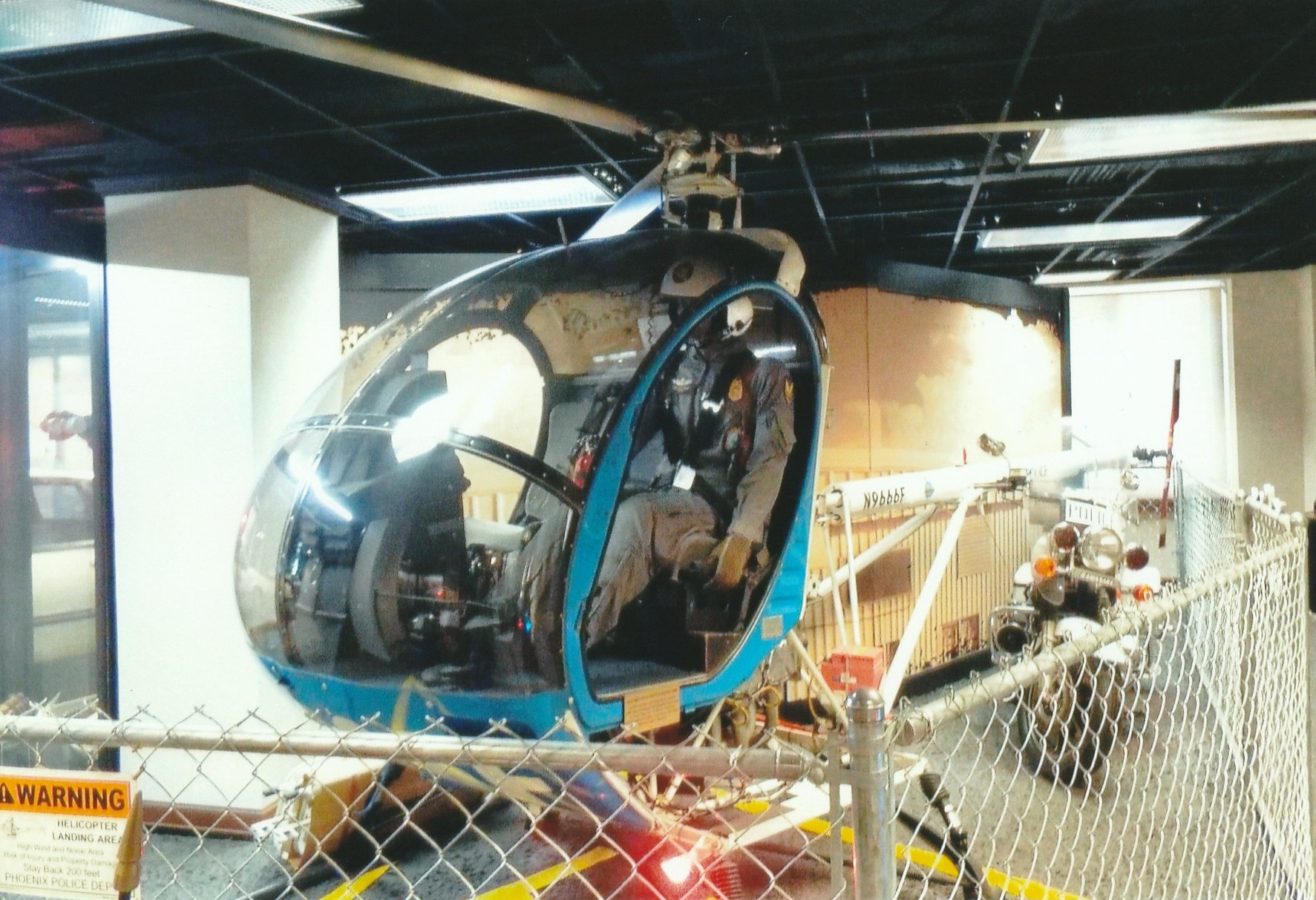
The first helicopter used by the Phoenix Police Department in 1974 was a Hughes 300C model.

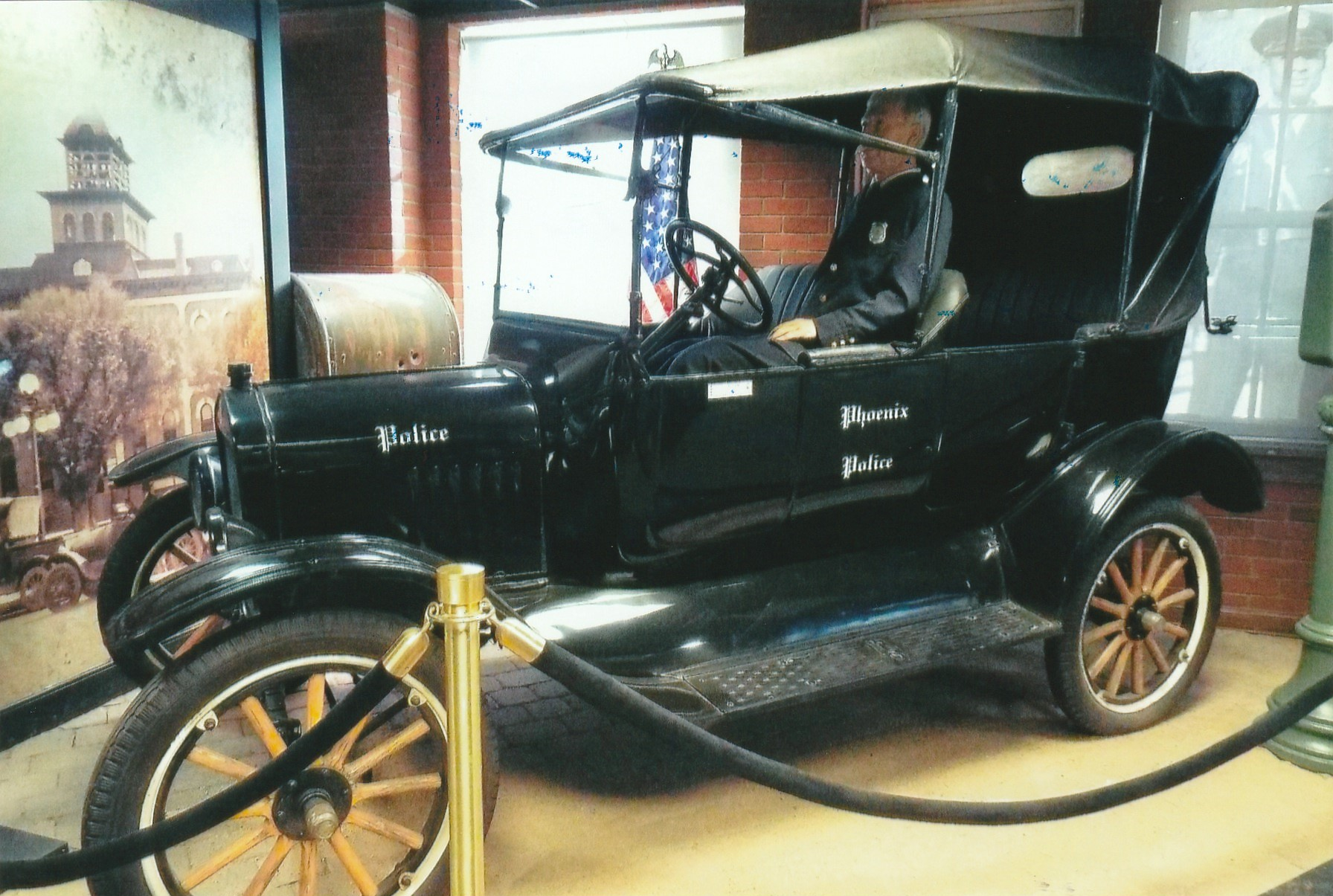
A 1919 Ford Model T Phoenix Police Cruiser. It had a 20-horsepower engine and ran a maximum speed of 45 MPH.

== See also ==
- List of law enforcement agencies in Arizona
- Maricopa County Sheriff's Office
- Phoenix Police Museum
