= Good Sports =

1991 US sitcom television series

- Genre: Sitcom
- Created by: Alan Zweibel
- Written by: Larry Levin; Monica Johnson; Matt Wickline; Russ Woody; Ron Zimmerman; Alan Zweibel
- Directed by: Stan Lathan
- Starring: Ryan O'Neal; Farrah Fawcett; Lane Smith; Brian Doyle-Murray; Cleavant Derricks; Paul Feig; Christine Dunford
- Theme music composer: Andy Goldmark
- Opening theme: Good Sports performed by Al Green
- Composers: Robert Crew; Michael Tavera
- Country of origin: United States
- Original language: English
- No. of seasons: 1
- No. of episodes: 15

Production
- Executive producers: Bernie Brillstein; Brad Grey; Alan Zweibel
- Producers: Vic Kaplan; Ron Zimmerman
- Cinematography: Kenneth Peach, Jr.
- Editor: Jerry Bixman
- Running time: 22–24 minutes
- Production companies: Boom Productions; Silly Robin Productions; Brillstein-Grey Productions

Original release
- Network: CBS
- Release: January 10 – July 13, 1991

Good Sports is an American sitcom television series that aired on the CBS network from January 10 to July 13, 1991, starring Farrah Fawcett and Ryan O'Neal. It was Fawcett's only scripted television series after Charlie's Angels.

== Plot ==
The show features the two main characters, Bobby Tannen (O'Neal), a once-famous former football player for the New York Jets gone to seed and Gayle Roberts (Fawcett), an ex-Miss America, as mismatched anchors on an all-sports cable network, Mr. Downtown Bobby Tannen and Ms. Gayle Roberts. Bobby is a self-obsessed jock, constantly worried about himself and his image. Gayle is the more down to earth and level-headed of the two. Both characters were concerned with the ratings of their sports show, outwardly disliking each other but nonetheless mutually attracted.

== Cast ==
- Farrah Fawcett as Gayle Roberts
- Ryan O'Neal as Bobby Tannen
- Lane Smith as R.J. Rappaport, the huffy cable channel owner
- Brian Doyle-Murray as John "Mac" MacKinney, the sport show's obsequious producer
- Cleavant Derricks as Jeff Mussberger
- Paul Feig as Leash
- Christine Dunford as Missy Van Johnson

== Reception and cancellation ==
Good Sports premiered as a mid-season replacement on January 10, 1991. Reviews were generally mixed and ratings were low. After the ratings failed to improve, CBS canceled the series. The final episode, "A Class Act", aired on July 13, 1991.

== Production ==
The 30-minute Brillstein-Grey production was created by Alan Zweibel and directed by Stan Lathan. The series' theme song was performed by Al Green.

== Episodes ==
No.	Title	Directed by	Written by	Original release date
1	"Pros and Ex-Cons"	Stan Lathan	Alan Zweibel	January 10, 1991
2	"Gayle Wouldn't Do That"	Stan Lathan	Larry Levin & Ron Zimmerman & Alan Zweibel	January 21, 1991
3	"Movin' In"	Stan Lathan	Monica Johnson & Alan Zweibel	January 31, 1991
4	"The Bigger They Are, the Harder They Hit"	Stan Lathan	Ron Zimmerman	February 7, 1991
5	"John McKinney Is a No Yes Man"	Stan Lathan	S : Matt Wickline; T : Larry Levin & Ron Zimmerman	February 14, 1991
6	"The Reviews Are In"	Stan Lathan	Larry Levin	February 25, 1991
7	"A Kiss Is Just a Kiss"	Stan Lathan	Russ Woody	March 18, 1991
8	"A Book Is Just a Book"	Stan Lathan	Russ Woody	May 27, 1991
9	"The Cincinnati Kids"	Stan Lathan	Larry Levin and Alan Zweibel	May 27, 1991
10	"Electricity"	Stan Lathan	Larry Levin & Alan Zweibel	June 3, 1991
11	"The Moody Blues Swing"	Stan Lathan	Monica Johnson	June 8, 1991
12	"Love Means Never Having to Say You're Happy"	Stan Lathan	Ron Zimmerman	June 15, 1991
13	"Bobby and Gayle Go on a Date"	Stan Lathan	Ron Zimmerman and Alan Zweibel	June 22, 1991
14	"The Return of Nick"	Stan Lathan	Ron Zimmerman	July 6, 1991
15	"A Class Act"	Stan Lathan	Larry Levin	July 13, 1991
