= Campbell-Chrisp House =

Historic house in Arkansas, United States

- U.S. National Register of Historic Places
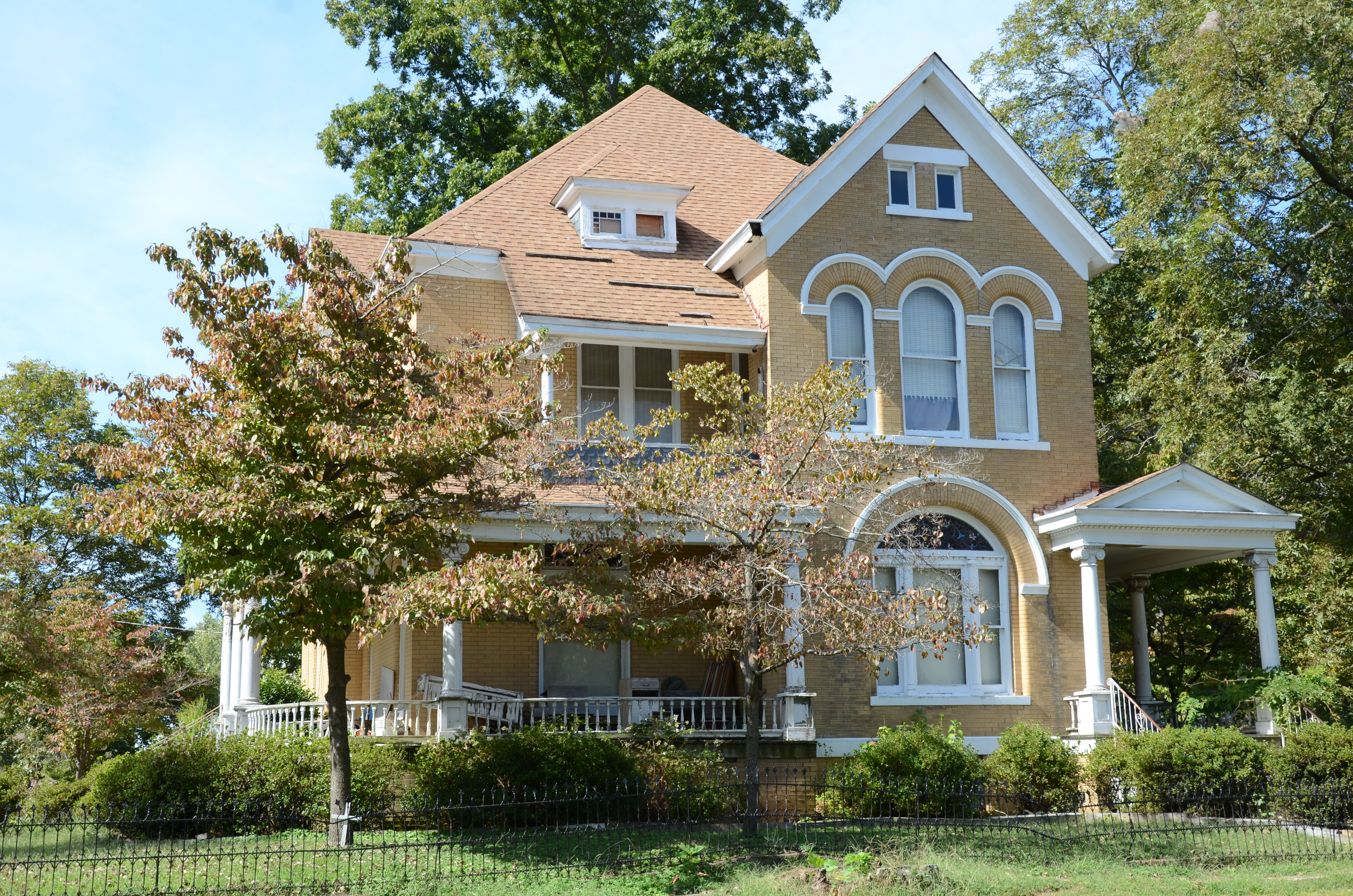

- Location within Arkansas Location within the United States
- Location: 102 Elm St., Bald Knob, Arkansas
- Coordinates: 35°18′38″N 91°34′9″W
- Area: less than one acre
- Built: 1899
- Built by: Newport Builders Supply and Hardware
- Architect: Charles L. Thompson
- Architectural style: Colonial Revival, Romanesque
- MPS: White County MPS
- NRHP reference No.: 91001280
- Added to NRHP: September 5, 1991

The Campbell-Chrisp House is a historic house at 102 Elm Street in Bald Knob, Arkansas. It is a 2 1/2-story structure, supposedly designed by Charles Thompson, in a Romanesque style with Colonial Revival details. Prominent features include a large round-arch window on the first floor, above which is a three-part window with tall sections topped by round arches. A porch supported by Ionic columns wraps around the front and side of the house. The house was built in 1899 for Thomas Campbell, a local businessman.

The house was listed on National Register of Historic Places in 1991.

== See also ==
- National Register of Historic Places listings in White County, Arkansas
