= Carroll Cooley =

American police detective

- Born: Carroll Franklin Cooley; August 25, 1935; Bald Knob, Arkansas, U.S.
- Died: May 29, 2023 (aged 87); Phoenix, Arizona, U.S.
- Education: Saint Mary's College of California
- Occupation: Police detective
- Spouse: Glee Caron (m. 1965)

Carroll Franklin Cooley (August 25, 1935 – May 29, 2023) was an American police detective. He was known for arresting laborer Ernesto Miranda. The arrest led to failing to warn a person of their constitutional rights before interrogating them, becoming a landmark U.S. Supreme Court case named Miranda v. Arizona.

== Life and career ==
Cooley was born in Bald Knob, Arkansas, the son of John Cooley, a car mechanic, and Donna Mae, a homemaker. At an early age, he and his family moved to Phoenix Arizona. He served in the United States Air Force for four years, which after his discharge, in 1958, he joined the Phoenix Police Department. Over the years working in the police department, he was promoted to the rank of detective.

On March 13, 1963, Cooley and fellow police officer Wilfred Young arrested laborer Ernesto Miranda. The arrest led to failing to warn a person of their constitutional rights before interrogating them, becoming a landmark U.S. Supreme Court case named Miranda v. Arizona, which ruled that criminal suspects must be informed of their right against self-incrimination and their right to consult with an attorney before being questioned by police.

In 1977, Cooley earned his bachelor's degree from Saint Mary's College of California. The next year, he retired his position as detective from the police department. After retiring, he worked as an adjunct professor at the University of Illinois Urbana-Champaign. He returned to Phoenix, Arizona in 1985.

== Death ==
Cooley died on May 29, 2023, at his home in Phoenix Arizona, at the age of 87.
