= Bad Impulse =

- Film poster
- Directed by: Michelle Danner
- Written by: Jason Chase Tyrrell
- Starring: Grant Bowler; Sonya Walger; James Landry Hébert; Dan Lauria; Paul Sorvino
- Edited by: Teferi Seifu
- Distributed by: Gravitas Ventures
- Release date: February 29, 2020 (Golden State Film Festival)
- Country: United States
- Language: English

Bad Impulse is a 2020 American horror film directed by Michelle Danner and starring Grant Bowler, Sonya Walger, James Landry Hébert, Dan Lauria and Paul Sorvino.

== Cast ==
- Grant Bowler as Henry Sharpe
- Sonya Walger as Christine Sharpe
- David Coussins as Liam
- Paul Sorvino as Lou Branch
- James Landry Hébert as The Stranger
- Stephanie Cayo as Lucia
- Dan Lauria as Brandon Reilly
- Rebecca Black as Joy
- Sadou Bah as Policeman

== Release ==
The film premiered at the TCL Chinese Theatre as part of the Golden State Film Festival on February 29, 2020. Gravitas Ventures then acquired distribution rights to the film in November 2020. The film was then released in select theaters and on VOD on December 18, 2020.

== Reception ==
Josiah Teal of Film Threat gave the film a 7 out of 10.
