= Ernesto Miranda =

American criminal and subject of a United States Supreme Court case (1941–1976)

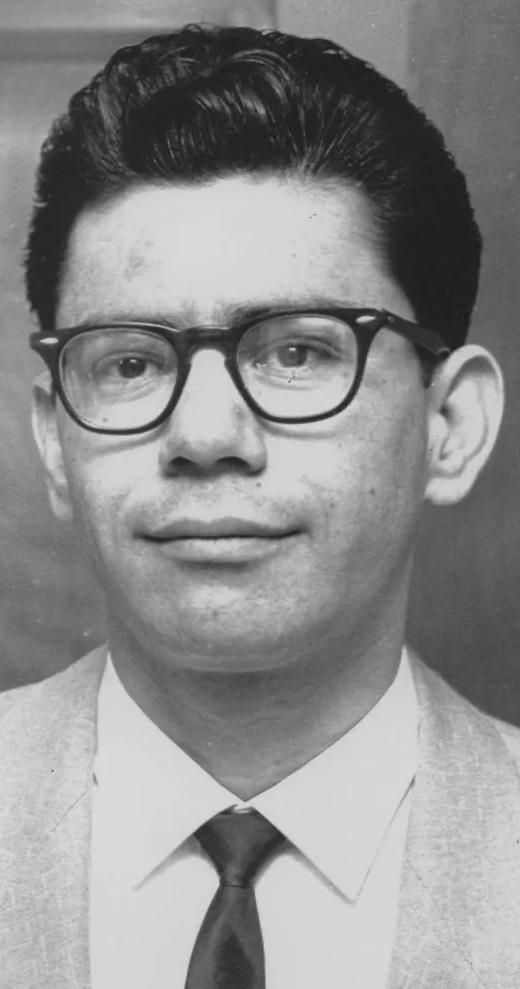
- Miranda in 1967
- Born: Ernesto Arturo Miranda; March 9, 1941; Mesa, Arizona, U.S.
- Died: January 31, 1976 (aged 34); Phoenix, Arizona, U.S.
- Cause of death: Murder by stabbing
- Resting place: City of Mesa Cemetery, Arizona
- Occupation: Laborer
- Known for: Miranda v. Arizona
- Status: Deceased (Note: Convicted June 12, 1963; Overturned June 13, 1966 for tainted evidence; Convicted again March 1, 1967)
- Convictions: Kidnapping, rape
- Penalty: 60 to 70 years in prison

Ernesto Arturo Miranda (March 9, 1941 – January 31, 1976) was an American laborer whose criminal conviction was set aside in the landmark U.S. Supreme Court case Miranda v. Arizona, which ruled that criminal suspects must be informed of their right against self-incrimination and their right to consult with an attorney before being questioned by police. This warning is known as a Miranda warning. Miranda had been convicted of kidnapping, rape, and armed robbery charges based on his confession under police interrogation.

After the Supreme Court decision invalidated Miranda's initial conviction, the state of Arizona tried him again. At the second trial, with his confession excluded from evidence, he was convicted. He was sentenced to 20–30 years in prison, but was paroled in 1972. After his release, he returned to his old neighborhood and made a modest living autographing police officers' "Miranda cards" that contained the text of the warning for reading to arrestees. Miranda was stabbed to death during an argument in a bar in Phoenix, Arizona on January 31, 1976. A Mexican man, Eseziquiel Moreno Pérez, was charged with the murder of Miranda, but fled to Mexico and has never been located.

== Early life ==
Ernesto Arturo Miranda was born in Mesa, Arizona, on March 9, 1941. Miranda began getting in trouble when he was in grade school. Shortly after his mother died, his father remarried. Miranda and his father did not get along very well; he kept his distance from his brothers and stepmother as well. Miranda's first criminal conviction was during his eighth-grade year. The following year, he was convicted of burglary and sentenced to a year in reform school.

In 1956, about a month after his release from the Arizona State Industrial School for Boys (ASISB), he ran afoul of the law once more and was returned to ASISB. Upon his second release from reform school, he relocated to Los Angeles, California. Within months of his arrival in L.A., Miranda was arrested (but not convicted) on suspicion of armed robbery and for some sex offences. After two and a half years in custody, the 18-year-old Miranda was extradited back to Arizona.

He drifted through the southern U.S. for a few months, spending time in jail in Texas for living on the street without money or a place to live, and was arrested in Nashville, Tennessee, for driving a stolen car. Miranda was sentenced to one year and a day in the federal prison system because he had driven the stolen vehicle across state lines. He spent his sentence in Chillicothe, Ohio, and later in Lompoc, California.

For the next couple of years, Miranda kept out of jail, working at various jobs, until he became a laborer on the night loading dock for the Phoenix Produce Company. At that time he started living with Twila Hoffman, a 29-year-old married mother of two who could not afford to obtain a divorce from her estranged husband.

== Attack on Patricia Weir and Supreme Court ==
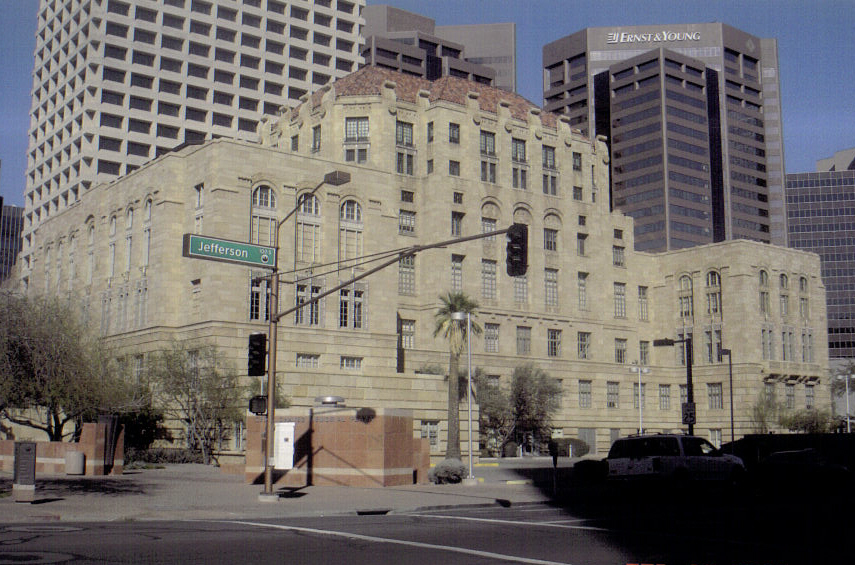

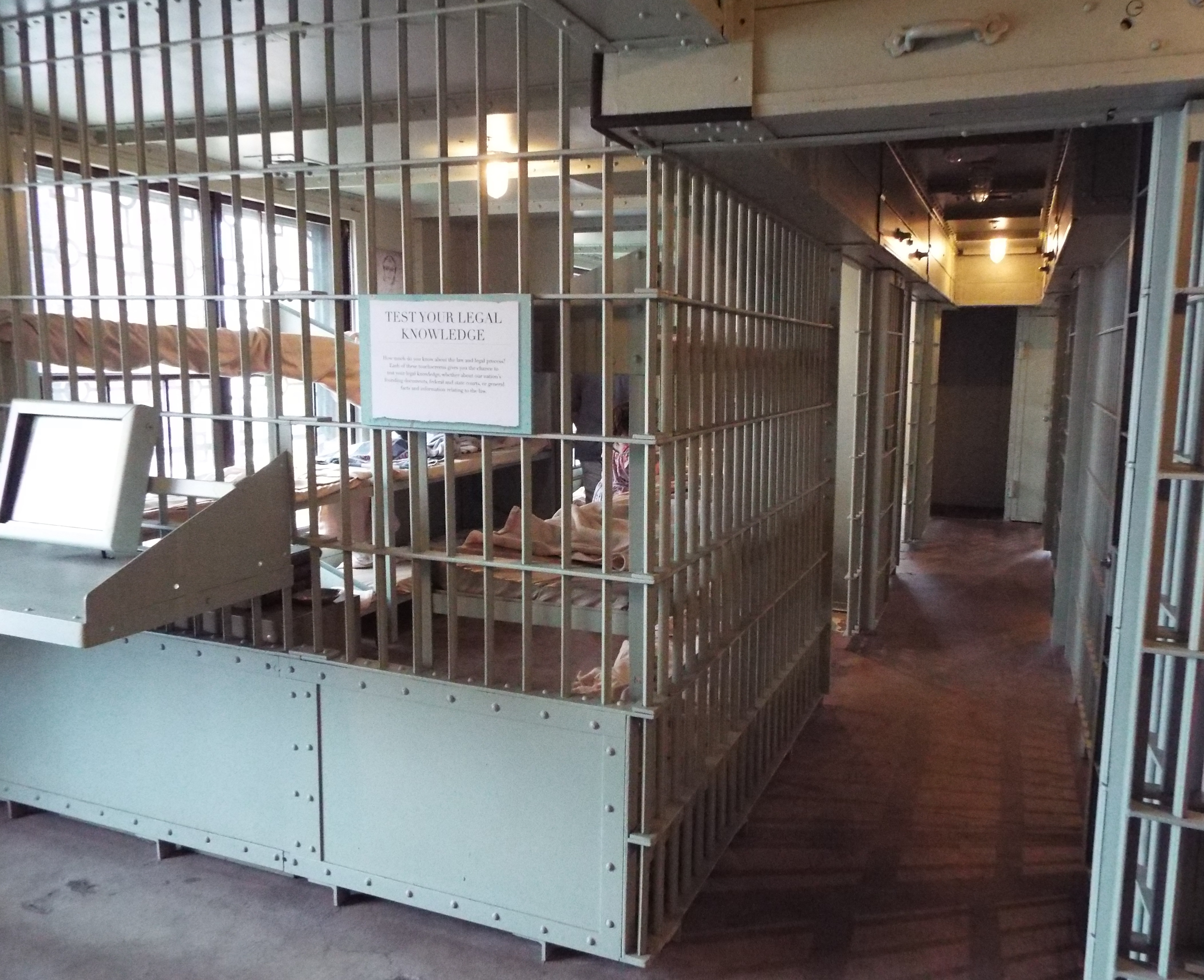
The old Maricopa County Courthouse, where Miranda was imprisoned and his trial held.

Late in the evening of March 2, 1963, 18-year old Patricia Weir was kidnapped soon after she exited a bus she took home from work in Phoenix, Arizona. A man she later described as about the age of 25 and either Mexican or Italian threatened her with a knife, tied her arms and legs with rope, and drove her to an isolated area outside town where he raped her before releasing her closer to town. She reported the incident to police, and gave a detailed description of the attacker and the car he drove.

On March 13, 1963 Weir's brother saw a man who was driving a car similar to the one described by his sister, and reported the license plate number to police. The car was registered to Twila Hoffman, Miranda's common law wife. As Miranda approximated the age and description by Weir, Phoenix Police Department officers Carroll Cooley and Wilfred Young confronted Miranda who voluntarily accompanied them to the police station and participated in a police lineup. At the time, Miranda was a person of interest, but not formally in custody.

After the lineup Miranda asked how he fared, and the police implied that he was positively identified at which point he was placed under arrest and taken to an interrogation room. After two hours of interrogation, some of which regarded another offense for which Miranda was separately tried and convicted, Miranda hand-wrote a confession to the kidnapping and rape of Weir. At the top of each sheet was a printed certification: "this statement has been made voluntarily and of my own free will, with no threats, coercion or promises of immunity and with full knowledge of my legal rights, understanding any statement I make can and will be used against me." After confessing to the officers, Miranda was taken to meet the victim for positive voice identification. Asked by officers in her presence whether this was the victim, he said: "That's the girl." The victim stated the sound of Miranda's voice matched that of the culprit.

Despite the printed statement on top of the sheets that Miranda used to write his confession, "with full knowledge of my legal rights," he was not informed of his right to have an attorney present, nor of his right to remain silent when he was arrested or before his interrogation. 73-year-old Alvin Moore was assigned to represent Miranda at trial. The trial was conducted in mid-June 1963 before Maricopa County Superior Court Judge Yale McFate.

Moore objected to entering the confession by Miranda as evidence during the trial but was overruled. Miranda was convicted of rape and kidnapping, based largely on the confession, and sentenced to 20 to 30 years in prison on both charges. Moore appealed to the Arizona Supreme Court, where the conviction was upheld.

Filing as a pauper, Miranda submitted his plea for a writ of certiorari, or request for review of his case to the U.S. Supreme Court in June 1965. After Alvin Moore was unable to continue representing Miranda because of health reasons, American Civil Liberties Union (ACLU) attorney Robert J. Corcoran asked John J. Flynn, a criminal defense attorney, to serve pro bono, along with his partner, John P. Frank, and associates Paul G. Ulrich and Robert A. Jensen of the law firm Lewis & Roca in Phoenix to represent Miranda. They wrote a 2,500-word petition for certiorari arguing Miranda's Fifth Amendment rights had been violated, and they submitted the document to the United States Supreme Court.

== Miranda v. Arizona ==
In November 1965, the Supreme Court agreed to hear Miranda's case, Miranda v. Arizona, along with three other similar cases to clear all confusion created by the decision in Escobedo v. Illinois. That previous case had ruled that:

Under the circumstances of this case, where a police investigation is no longer a general inquiry into an unsolved crime but has begun to focus on a particular suspect in police custody who has been refused an opportunity to consult with his counsel and who has not been warned of his constitutional right to keep silent, the accused has been denied the assistance of counsel in violation of the Sixth and Fourteenth Amendments, and no statement extracted by the police during the interrogation may be used against him at a trial. Crooker v. California, 357 U.S. 433, and Cicenia v. Lagay, 357 U.S. 504, distinguished, and, to the extent that they may be inconsistent with the instant case, they are not controlling. 479–492.

In January 1966, Flynn and Frank submitted their argument stating that Miranda's Sixth Amendment right to counsel had been violated by the Phoenix Police Department. Two weeks later the State of Arizona responded by asserting that Miranda's rights had not been violated. The first day of the case was on the last day of February 1966. Because of the three companion cases and other information, the case had a second day of oral arguments on March 1, 1966.

John Flynn for Miranda outlined the case and then stated that Miranda had not been advised of his right to remain silent when he had been arrested and questioned, adding the Fifth Amendment argument to his case. Flynn contended that an emotionally disturbed man like Miranda, who had a limited education, should not be expected to know his Fifth Amendment right not to incriminate himself.

Gary Nelson represented the State of Arizona arguing that this was not a Fifth Amendment issue but just an attempt to expand the Sixth Amendment Escobedo decision. He urged the justices to clarify their position, but not to push the limits of Escobedo too far. He then told the court that forcing police to advise suspects of their rights would seriously obstruct public safety.

The second day concerned arguments from related cases. Thurgood Marshall, the former NAACP attorney, was the last to argue. In his capacity as the Solicitor General, he presented the Johnson administration's view of the case: that the government did not have the resources to appoint a lawyer for every indigent person who was accused of a crime.

Chief Justice Earl Warren wrote the opinion in Miranda v. Arizona. The decision was in favor of Miranda. It stated that:

The person in custody must, prior to interrogation, be clearly informed that he has the right to remain silent, and that anything he says will be used against him in court; he must be clearly informed that he has the right to consult with a lawyer and to have the lawyer with him during interrogation, and that, if he is indigent, a lawyer will be appointed to represent him.

The opinion was released on June 13, 1966. Because of the decision, police departments throughout the U.S. started to issue Miranda warning cards for their officers to recite. The Supreme Court did not mandate a specific wording and, although word choice is similar, the exact language used varies between jurisdictions. A generic admonition might look like this:

You have the right to remain silent. If you give up that right, anything you say can and will be used against you in a court of law. You have the right to an attorney and to have an attorney present during questioning. If you cannot afford an attorney, one will be provided to you.

== Life after Miranda v. Arizona ==
The Supreme Court invalidated Miranda's conviction, which was tainted by the use of the confession that had been obtained through improper interrogation. The state of Arizona retried him. At the second trial, his confession was not introduced into evidence, but he was convicted again, on March 1, 1967, based on testimony given by his then-estranged partner Twila Hoffman that he had confessed to the crime. He was sentenced to 20 to 30 years in prison.

Miranda was paroled in 1972. After his release, he started selling autographed Miranda warning cards for $1.50. Over the next few years, Miranda was arrested numerous times for minor driving offenses and eventually lost his license. He was arrested for the possession of a gun but the charges were dropped. However, because this violated his parole, he was sent back to Arizona State Prison for another year before being released.

== Death ==
Murder of Ernesto Miranda
- Location: Phoenix, Arizona, U.S.
- Date: January 31, 1976; 50 years ago
- Attack type: Murder by stabbing
- Weapon: Knife
- Victims: Ernesto Arturo Miranda, aged 34
- Motive: Personal dispute
- Accused: Eseziquiel Moreno Pérez
- Charges: Murder

On January 31, 1976, a fight erupted at the Amapola Bar at 233 South 2nd Street in downtown Phoenix in which Miranda was stabbed. He was pronounced dead on arrival at Banner Good Samaritan Medical Center. He was 34. Several Miranda cards were found on his person. Miranda was buried in the City of Mesa Cemetery in Mesa, Arizona.

The man suspected of murdering Miranda, then-23-year-old Eseziquiel Moreno Pérez, was formally charged with murder on February 4, 1976. However, he has never been apprehended as he fled to Mexico following the murder and has never been found.

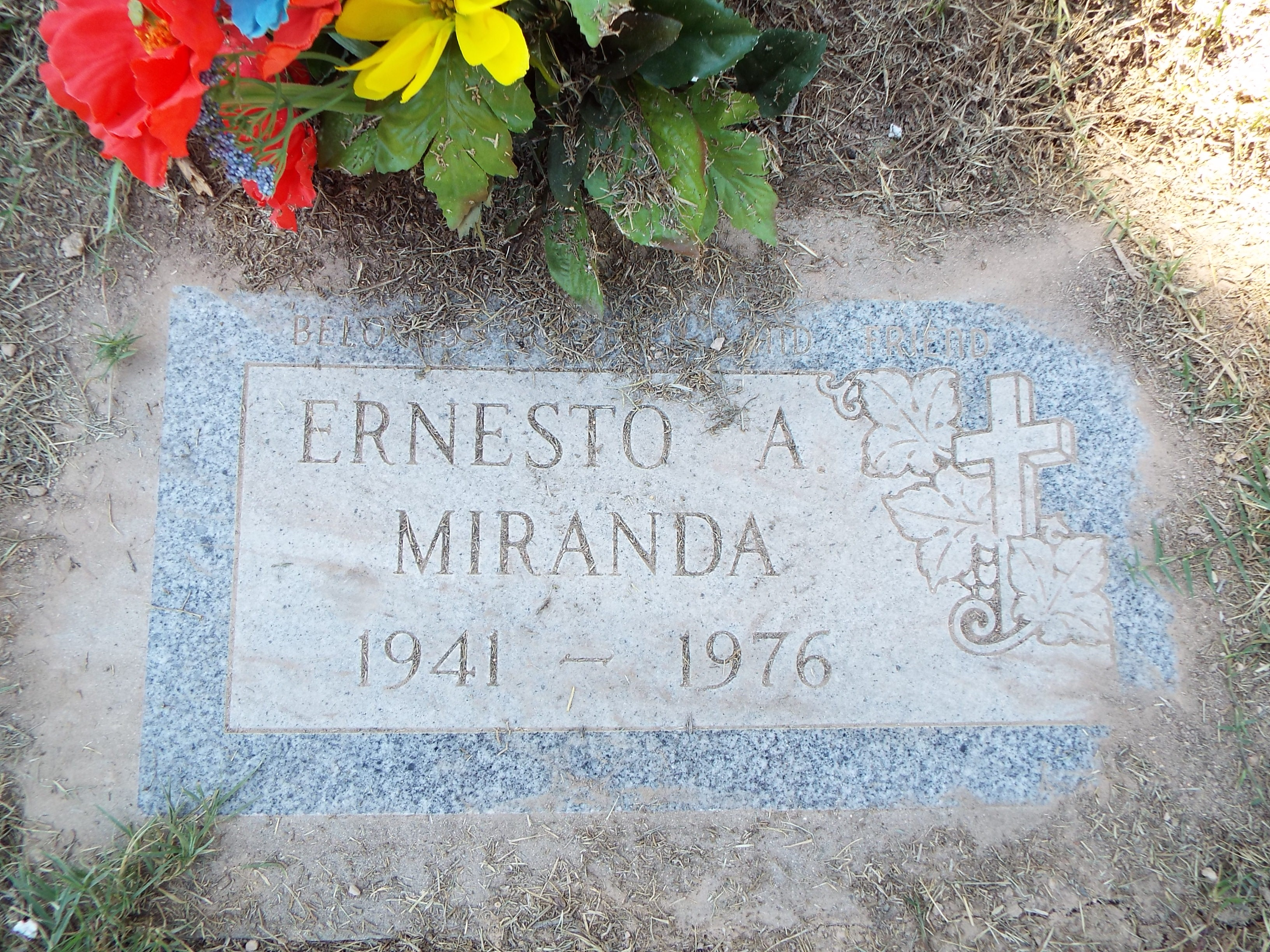
The grave of Ernesto Arturo Miranda in the City of Mesa Cemetery
