= Michelle Danner =

American actor, director, and acting coach

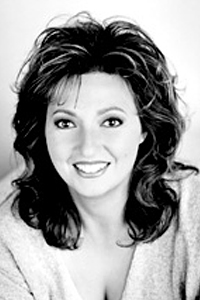
Michelle Danner

Michelle Danner is an American acting coach at the Los Angeles Acting School who specializes in the Meisner, Strasberg, Adler, Hagen, Chekhov and Stanislavsky techniques. She is also the founding and artistic director of the Edgemar Center for the Arts.

Danner is the daughter of a former William Morris agent, and she currently works as an actor, director and acting coach.

== Career ==
In 2006, Danner made her film directing debut with, How to Go Out on a Date in Queens, winning the LA Film Awards' Best Acting and Best Movie awards. Michelle Danner’s 2013 film Hello Herman catalogs the effect that peer abuse, parental neglect and the general coarsening of society has on a typical high school student. A New York Times review found that Danner's anti-bullying agenda freighted the movie.

Danner has acted in and directed over thirty plays in Los Angeles and New York, with her favorite acting credit cited as the Dramalogue award-winning Tennessee Williams' The Rose Tattoo.

At Edgemar, Danner produced The Night of the Black Cat, winner of the 2005 Best Musical of the Year at the Los Angeles Music Awards. She directed the world premiere of Mental the Musical, winner of several 17th Annual TicketHolder awards for acting and musical score. Last year she wrote and directed You're on the Air, an improvisation-based comedy which is currently under development to become a movie.

She produced and acted in the award-winning short Dos Corazones, directed by Larry Moss, which won Best Cinematography and Audience Favorite at the Malibu Film Festival.

She was the acting coach expert on comedy on the WB show "The Starlet". She was voted favorite acting coach by Backstage readers. Once a year Danner directs for the industry at the multimedia event Scene Bites. She was featured coaching Andy Richter on The Tonight Show with Conan O'Brien in July 2009.

Danner, alongside Larry Moss, is the founder and Artistic Director of Edgemar Center for the Arts and The Edgemar Theatre Group. She raised $1.3 million in a Capital campaign which went to the construction of the two theatres and the art gallery. Her production company All In Films is in development for several film projects: You're on the Air, Starstruck and The Italians.

In 2020, Danner reunited with Paul Sorvino for the horror film, Bad Impulse premiering at the TCL Chinese Theatre as part of the Golden State Film Festival. The film also starred Grant Bowler, Sonya Walger, and Dan Lauria.

In 2022, Danner directed Anne Archer in Ticket to the Circus, a one-woman play about the life of Norris Church Mailer. The play will be streamed virtually in 2023.

Danner followed up Ticket to the Circus by producing and directing Miranda's Victim, an American biographical crime drama that depicts the origin of the Miranda warning. The film will star Abigail Breslin, Luke Wilson, Andy Garcia and Donald Sutherland, Ryan Phillippe, Kyle MacLachlan, Mireille Enos, Taryn Manning, Emily VanCamp, Enrique Murciano, Brent Sexton, Josh Bowman, and Sebastian Quinn.

In April 2023 it was announced Danner would be directing the sci-fi action thriller, Helios.

== Filmography ==
Year	Film	Role/Position	Notes
1998	Dos Corazones	Producer/Actress	Film
2006	How to Go Out on a Date in Queens	Director/Producer/Actress	Film
2009	The Tonight Show with Conan O'Brien	Herself	TV
2010	Death at a Funeral	Acting coach	Film
2010	Father of Invention	Acting coach	Film
2011	Workshop	Actress	TV series
2011–12	Actors Entertainment	Self	TV series
2012	Hello Herman	Producer/Director	Film
2016	The Bandit Hound	Producer/Director	Film
2020	Bad Impulse	Producer/Director	Film
2021	The Runner	Producer/Director	Film
2023	Miranda's Victim	Producer/Director	Film
TBA	Helios	Director	Film
