= Dickerson v. United States =

- Supreme Court of the United States

Argued April 19, 2000 Decided June 26, 2000
- Full case name: Charles Thomas Dickerson, Petitioner v. United States
- Citations: 530 U.S. 428 (more) 120 S. Ct. 2326; 147 L. Ed. 2d 405; 2000 U.S. LEXIS 4305

Case history
- Prior: United States v. Dickerson, 971 F. Supp. 1023 (E.D. Va. 1997); reversed, 166 F.3d 667 (4th Cir. 1999).

Holding
- The mandate of Miranda v. Arizona that a criminal suspect be advised of certain constitutional rights governs the admissibility at trial of the suspect's statements, not the requirement of 18 U.S.C. § 3501 that such statements simply be voluntarily given.

Court membership
- Chief Justice William Rehnquist Associate Justices John P. Stevens · Sandra Day O'Connor; Antonin Scalia · Anthony Kennedy; David Souter · Clarence Thomas; Ruth Bader Ginsburg · Stephen Breyer

Case opinions
- Majority: Rehnquist, joined by Stevens, O'Connor, Kennedy, Souter, Ginsburg, Breyer
- Dissent: Scalia, joined by Thomas

Laws applied
- U.S. Const. amend. V; 18 U.S.C. § 3501

Dickerson v. United States, 530 U.S. 428 (2000), upheld the requirement that the Miranda warning be read to criminal suspects and struck down a federal statute that purported to overrule Miranda v. Arizona (1966).

Dickerson is regarded as a significant example of a rare departure by the Court from the principle of party presentation. The Court noted that neither party in the case advocated on behalf of the constitutionality of 18 U.S.C. § 3501, the specific statute at issue in the case. Accordingly, it invited Paul Cassell, a former law clerk to Antonin Scalia and Warren E. Burger, to argue that perspective. Cassell was then a professor at the University of Utah law school; he was later appointed to, and subsequently resigned from, a federal district court judgeship in that state.

== Background ==
In Miranda v. Arizona, the Supreme Court held that statements of criminal suspects made while they are in custody and subject to interrogation by police may not be admitted in court unless the suspect first had certain warnings read to them beforehand. By now, these warnings are familiar to most Americans: that the suspect has the right to remain silent during the interrogation, that anything they say to the police may be used against them in a court of law, that they have the right to legal counsel, and that if they cannot afford legal counsel a lawyer will be provided for them.

In 1968, two years after the Miranda decision, Congress passed a law that purported to overrule it as part of the Omnibus Crime Control and Safe Streets Act of 1968. This statute, 18 U.S.C. § 3501, directed federal trial judges to admit statements of criminal defendants if they were made voluntarily, without regard to whether they had received the Miranda warnings. Under § 3501, voluntariness depended on such things as (1) the time between arrest and arraignment, (2) whether the defendant knew the crime for which they had been arrested, (3) whether they had been told that they did not have to talk to the police and that any statement could be used against them, (4) whether the defendant knew prior to questioning that they had the right to the assistance of counsel, and (5) whether they actually had the assistance of counsel during questioning. However, the "presence or absence of any of" these factors "need not be conclusive on the issue of voluntariness of the confession." Because § 3501 was an act of Congress, it applied only to federal criminal proceedings and criminal proceedings in the District of Columbia.

Charles Dickerson had been arrested for bank robbery and for using a firearm during a crime of violence, both federal crimes. He moved to suppress statements he made to the FBI because he had not received the Miranda warnings before he spoke to the FBI. The district court suppressed the statements, and so the government appealed. The Fourth Circuit reversed the district court, reasoning that § 3501 had supplanted the requirement that the police give the Miranda warnings because Miranda was not a constitutional requirement and therefore Congress could overrule that decision by legislation. The Supreme Court then agreed to hear the case.

== Opinion of the Court ==
Chief Justice Rehnquist wrote the majority opinion, and began by briefly describing the historical backdrop against which the Miranda ruling had emerged. A suspect's confession had always been inadmissible if it had been the result of coercion or otherwise given involuntarily. This was true in England, from where American law inherited that rule.

However, as time went on, the Supreme Court recognized that the Fifth Amendment was an independent source of protection for statements made by criminal defendants in the course of police interrogation. "In Miranda, we noted that the advent of modern custodial police interrogation brought with it an increased concern about confessions obtained by coercion." Custodial police interrogation by its very nature "isolates and pressures the individual" so that he might eventually be worn down and confess to crimes he did not commit in order to end the ordeal. In Miranda, the Court had adopted the now-famous four warnings to protect against this particular evil.

Congress, in response, enacted § 3501. That statute clearly was designed to overrule Miranda because it expressly focused solely on voluntariness of the confession as a touchstone for admissibility. Did Congress have the authority to pass such a law? On the one hand, the Court's power to craft nonconstitutional supervisory rules over the federal courts exists only in the absence of a specific statute passed by Congress. However, if on the other hand the Miranda rule was constitutional, Congress could not overrule it, because the Court alone is the final arbiter of what the Constitution requires. As evidence of the fact that the Miranda rule was constitutional in nature, the Court pointed out that many of its subsequent decisions applying and limiting the requirement arose in decisions from state courts, over which the Court lacked the power to impose supervisory nonconstitutional rules. Furthermore, although the Court had previously invited legislative involvement in the effort to devise prophylactic measures for protecting criminal defendants against overbearing tactics of the police, it had consistently held that these measures must not take away from the protections Miranda had afforded.

Finally, 34 years after the original decision, the Court was loath to overrule Miranda. Typically, the Court overrules constitutional decisions only when their doctrinal underpinnings have eroded. The Court felt that this was not the case in Miranda. "If anything, our subsequent cases have reduced the impact of the Miranda rule on legitimate law enforcement while reaffirming the decision's core ruling that unwarned statements may not be used as evidence in the prosecution's case in chief." The Miranda rule did not displace the voluntariness inquiry.

== Dissent ==
Justice Scalia, joined by Justice Thomas, disagreed with the majority's decision not to overrule Miranda. He disputed the notion that Miranda was a constitutional rule, pointing to several cases in which the Court had declined to exclude evidence despite the absence of warnings.

Justice Scalia described the majority's decision as an unprincipled compromise between justices who believed Miranda was a constitutional requirement and those who disagreed. He noted that the majority did not state outright that the Miranda warning is a constitutional requirement, but merely that it is "constitutionally based." Justice Scalia further criticized the majority for implying that Congress has no power to override judicially imposed safeguards of constitutional rights.
