= Hello Herman =

American drama film by Michelle Danner

- Theatrical release poster
- Directed by: Michelle Danner
- Written by: John Buffalo Mailer
- Produced by: Ed Cha; Michelle Danner; Brian Drillinger; Alexandra Guarnieri
- Starring: Norman Reedus; Martha Higareda
- Cinematography: Sandra Valde-Hansen
- Edited by: Christian Kinnard
- Music by: Jeff Beal
- Production company: All in Films
- Distributed by: Gravitas Ventures; Freestyle Releasing
- Release dates: October 20, 2012 (Hollywood Film Festival); June 7, 2013 (United States)
- Running time: 85 minutes
- Country: United States
- Language: English
- Budget: $2 million
- Box office: $8,437

Hello, Herman is a 2012 American drama film directed by Michelle Danner, written by John Buffalo Mailer, and starring Norman Reedus, Garrett Backstrom, Rob Estes and Martha Higareda. It premiered at the 16th Annual Hollywood Film Festival on October 20, 2012.

== Plot ==
Set in the not-so-distant-future, in the United States, sixteen-year-old Herman Howards makes a fateful decision. He enters his suburban school and kills thirty-nine students, two teachers, and a police officer. Just before his arrest he emails his idol, famous journalist Lax Morales, sending him clips of the shootings captured with Herman's own digital camera. In the clips Herman tells Lax, "I want to tell my story on your show". Lax, haunted by his own past, is now face to face with Herman. Herman is executed in the electric chair. The movie explores why and how a massacre like this can happen in our society, desensitizing in America, youth violence and bullying, the impact the media has on our individual quest for fame, and ultimately our need for connection.

== Reception ==
On the review aggregator website Rotten Tomatoes, 20% of 10 critics' reviews are positive, with an average rating of 5.1/10. Metacritic has given the film a weighted average score of 27/100, based on 5 reviews, indicating "generally unfavorable" reviews.

Sam Adams of Time Out New York said that the most fitting punishment for Hello Herman was to simply ignore its existence: "it barely tries to offer insight into its much-debated subject, content to rip the scab off an ever-fresh wound for the sake of controversy." The Los Angeles Times's Amy Nicholson wrote about the incompetence of the director: "we're not sure what director Michelle Danner, who plays Herman's defensive mother in an uncredited role, wants us to get besides a reminder that angry boys act out for a host of half-defined reasons." The Village Voice's Rob Staeger stated that "the dialogue is all surface: emotions are laid out on the autopsy table for the audience to dissect and analyze, but rarely feel." The New York Times's Jeannette Catsoulis finds that "pointing at everything and elucidating nothing, Hello Herman arrives freighted with the anti-bullying agenda of its director, Michelle Danner." In contrast to other critics, Sam Kashner of Vanity Fair said that “Hello Herman is a powerful and important work, a darkly brilliant tone poem about America’s tango with violence and fame. Herman will get under your skin. He may even follow you home. What is certain is you won’t soon forget him.”

The Examiner's Courtney Hartmann said that "Michelle Danner's Hello Herman takes a look at the troubled youth of America... the film will definitely spark up conversations that have never really died since Columbine. The issues of teens in America especially when it comes to bullying and retaliation are a problem that need to be addressed far beyond a film." Danny Miller of MSN Movies called Hello Herman "A powerful film that should be required viewing for adolescents everywhere."

Director Michelle Danner issued a statement through the Hello Herman website addressing those that did not quite understand her intentions. "Hello Herman is being released today and it is sparking a lot of controversy. Some would love for me to not have made this movie. They want you to ignore the problem of violence in America. Many understand why I made this movie. They called it 'Daring... Unnerving, thought provoking...The type of movie that Hollywood rarely makes but should make more often.' I am purposely making a point to touch on many issues. It's about being very focused on the fact that there isn’t just one issue contributing to the escalating violence in teens, there are a multitude of them. Our world is not safe. I am a mother and feel a responsibility. This breakout violence is not going away. It’s spiraling out of control. There are so many factors that come together for these events to occur. I wanted to start the conversation and not let it die. When a shooting happens the media pounds on us and then they're on to the next thing. No one does anything and it happens again and again. That's why I made the film. Nothing changes. We need to keep seeing movies that deal with these issues. No, it’s not a popcorn film. We can't drop the ball on this one. This is the world we are leaving to our children and this world is getting more and more dangerous. We have to do something about it."

== Box office ==
As of July 7, 2013, Hello Herman has earned $8,437 in North America with an estimated budget of $1,500,000. The film earned $5,985 on its opening weekend.

== Reviews ==
ArkansasOnline

Current Movie Reviews

DigitalJournal

L.A. Times

Nerd Reactor

New York Times

ReelTalk

Shreveport Times

SlantMagazine

TimeOut

VillageVoice

== Interviews ==
BestMoviesEverNews
