= Bald Knob, Arkansas =

- City
- Seal
- Motto: "Where the Ozarks Meet the Delta"
- Location of Bald Knob in White County, Arkansas.

- Location in Arkansas.
- Coordinates: 35°18′44″N 91°34′15″W
- Country: United States
- State: Arkansas
- County: White
- Founded: 1881

Government
  - Mayor: Gary Looney

Area
  - Total: 5.02 sq mi (13.01 km^{2})
  - Land: 4.95 sq mi (12.83 km^{2})
  - Water: 0.069 sq mi (0.18 km^{2})
- Elevation: 246 ft (75 m)

Population (2020)
  - Total: 2,522
  - Estimate (2025): 2,548 ▲
  - Density: 509.0/sq mi (196.52/km^{2})
- Time zone: UTC-6 (Central (CST))
  - Summer (DST): UTC-5 (CDT)
- ZIP code: 72010
- Area code: 501
- FIPS code: 05-03280
- GNIS feature ID: 2403148
- Website: www.cityofbaldknob.com

Bald Knob is a city in White County, Arkansas, United States. The population was 2,522 at the 2020 census.

== Etymology ==
Bald Knob was named for a prominent, treeless ridge of layered rock that served as a landmark to pioneers. It was founded in 1881.

== Points of interest ==
The Campbell-Chrisp House, built in 1899, was designed by Charles L. Thompson. It is listed on the U.S. National Register of Historic Places.

== Geography ==
According to the United States Census Bureau, the city has a total area of 4.6 square miles (12 km^{2}), of which 4.5 square miles (12 km^{2}) is land and 0.1 square miles (0.26 km^{2}) is water.

== Transportation ==
=== Airports ===
Bald Knob Municipal Airport (FAA Identifier: M74), owned by the City of Bald Knob, features a 2,228’ x 50’ paved runway, as well as a 1,850’ by 100’ turf runway. Commercial air transport is available at the Bill and Hillary Clinton National Airport in Little Rock, about 62 miles southwest.

=== Railroads ===
Bald Knob is at a junction of the Union Pacific Railroad, with the town’s old Depot being the exact division of the Memphis and Chicago lines from Little Rock. Over 60 trains per day pass this point. Union Pacific said Bald Knob as a "Train Town USA," one of 131 communities out of 7,300 communities the railroad serves, because of the town's long-standing relationship with the line.

== Demographics ==
Historical population
Census	Pop.	Note	%±
1880	221		—
1900	707		—
1910	617		−12.7%
1920	958		55.3%
1930	1,273		32.9%
1940	1,445		13.5%
1950	2,022		39.9%
1960	1,705		−15.7%
1970	2,094		22.8%
1980	2,756		31.6%
1990	2,653		−3.7%
2000	3,210		21.0%
2010	2,897		−9.8%
2020	2,522		−12.9%
2025 (est.)	2,548		1.0%
U.S. Decennial Census; 2014 Estimate

=== 2020 census ===
As of the 2020 census, Bald Knob had a population of 2,522, with 1,041 households and 682 families residing in the city. The median age was 40.4 years. 23.5% of residents were under the age of 18 and 18.9% were 65 years of age or older. For every 100 females, there were 90.9 males, and for every 100 females age 18 and over, there were 85.1 males.

0.0% of residents lived in urban areas, while 100.0% lived in rural areas.

Of the 1,041 households, 31.6% had children under the age of 18 living in them. Of all households, 39.6% were married-couple households, 19.3% were households with a male householder and no spouse or partner present, and 35.7% were households with a female householder and no spouse or partner present. About 31.5% of all households were made up of individuals, and 14.9% had someone living alone who was 65 years of age or older.

There were 1,205 housing units, of which 13.6% were vacant. The homeowner vacancy rate was 2.7% and the rental vacancy rate was 15.0%.

Bald Knob racial composition
Race	Number	Percentage
White (non-Hispanic)	2,132	84.54%
Black or African American (non-Hispanic)	102	4.04%
Native American	10	0.4%
Asian	9	0.36%
Other/Mixed	144	5.71%
Hispanic or Latino	125	4.96%

=== 2000 census ===
As of the census of 2000, there were 3,210 people, 1,257 households, and 878 families residing in the city. The population density was 715.5 inhabitants per square mile (276.3/km^{2}). There were 1,395 housing units at an average density of 311.0 per square mile (120.1/km^{2}). The racial makeup of the city was 89.91% White, 6.07% Black or African American, 0.62% Native American, 0.59% Asian, 0.03% Pacific Islander, 1.21% from other races, and 1.56% from two or more races. 3.18% of the population were Hispanic or Latino of any race.

There were 1,257 households, out of which 33.3% had children under the age of 18 living with them, 51.9% were married couples living together, 13.5% had a female householder with no husband present, and 30.1% were non-families. 26.7% of all households were made up of individuals, and 15.1% had someone living alone who was 65 years of age or older. The average household size was 2.55 and the average family size was 3.08.

In the city, the population was spread out, with 27.2% under the age of 18, 10.3% from 18 to 24, 27.8% from 25 to 44, 20.5% from 45 to 64, and 14.2% who were 65 years of age or older. The median age was 34 years. For every 100 females, there were 92.0 males. For every 100 females age 18 and over, there were 87.9 males.

The median income for a household in the city was $26,970, and the median income for a family was $36,500. Males had a median income of $27,978 versus $19,000 for females. The per capita income for the city was $13,218. About 10.4% of families and 16.5% of the population were below the poverty line, including 22.7% of those under age 18 and 20.0% of those age 65 or over.

== Notable people ==
- Carroll Cooley (1935–2023), police detective

== See also ==
- List of cities in Arkansas
