= Right to silence in Australia =

Protection from self incrimination in Australia

The right to silence in Australia is the protection given to a person during criminal proceedings from adverse consequences of remaining silent. It is sometimes referred to as the privilege against self-incrimination. It is used on any occasion when it is considered the person being spoken to is under suspicion of having committed one or more criminal offences and consequently potentially being subject to criminal proceedings.

There is no constitutional protection for the right to silence in Australia, but a common law principle, known as the companion rule, provides individuals (but not corporations) this protection. There are some exclusions to the right to silence, such as the NSW Independent Commission Against Corruption where individuals can be compelled to give evidence.

== Background ==
Australia has no constitutional protection for the right to silence, but it is broadly recognized by State and Federal Crimes Acts and Codes and is regarded by the courts as an important common law right and a part of the privilege against self-incrimination. In general, criminal suspects in Australia have the right to refuse to answer questions posed to them by police before trial and to refuse to give evidence at trial. As a general rule judges cannot direct juries to draw adverse inferences from a defendant's silence (Petty v R) but there are exceptions to this rule, most notably in cases which rely entirely on circumstantial evidence which it is only possible for the defendant to testify about (Weissensteiner v R). This exception has been abolished in Victoria by sections 42 and 44 of the Jury Directions Act 2015. The right does not apply to corporations (EPA v Caltex).

== Companion rule ==
Within Australia, the right to silence derives from common law's companion rule. The basic position is adverse inference may not be drawn about the defendant's culpability, where he/she does not answer police questions. In substance, it is seen that a necessary and logical consequence of the right to silence is that the state is prevented from compelling a person to contribute to their own criminal conviction. The concept is closely related to the presumption of innocence and other historical principles of criminal procedure. While this is the common law position, it is buttressed by various legislative provisions.

The Companion Rule has its origins in English common law, inherited by Australia as a successor jurisdiction. Through legislation, the companion rule is able to be displaced by any Australian legislature; however, legislation attempting to abrogate the companion rule needs to be worded clearly and explicitly to be effective. This is because the companion rule is within the scope of the principle of legality.

Thus, s89A of the Evidence Act (NSW) operates to allow adverse inferences to be drawn from a failure to mention, when questioned, something which the subject later relies upon in Court and which he/she ought reasonably have been aware of at the time of questioning. This inference can only be drawn if the subject has been given the special caution, which is a caution in addition to the usual caution and the subject consults with an Australian Legal practitioner in persona so as to fully understand the effect of the special caution. In NSW a subject has the right to a lawyer being present in a police interrogation but they do not have the right to have a lawyer provided for them, therefore a lawyer will only attend if the subject can afford private legal counsel. Therefore, the subject can prevent the invocation of s89A by receiving legal advice over the phone or choosing not to have a lawyer present (assuming they can afford one).

It has also been upheld by the High Court in the case of Petty v R (1991) 173 CLR 95. However, where a defendant answers some police questions, but not others, an inference may sometimes be drawn about the questions they refused to answer. (See Coldrey, below.)

Where a defendant refuses to speak to the police, but then speaks to an undercover member of the police, the court is likely to exclude that evidence to ensure that the police do not avoid their limitations. However, if a defendant speaks to a person who is not a member of the police, and who is fitted with a listening device, that evidence would be admitted.[Queen v Swaffield; Pavic v The Queen (1998) 192 CLR]

Australian research indicates that very few suspects actually refuse to speak. Stevenson's research (see below for citation) indicates that only 4% of suspects who are subsequently charged and tried in the District Court of New South Wales in Sydney remain silent during interviews. The Victorian DPP found that 7–9% of suspects refused to answer police questions.

=== Restrictions ===
Through legislation, the companion rule is able to be displaced by any Australian legislature; however, legislation attempting to abrogate the companion rule needs to be worded clearly and explicitly to be effective. This is because the companion rule is within the scope of the principle of legality.

The companion rule has been held to be unavailable to Corporations in Australia.

== Proposed reform ==
A number of states have conducted enquiries into the adoption of the English changes set out in the Criminal Justice and Public Order Act 1994. All states have rejected such change. As the NSW Report said:

It is reasonable that innocent persons faced with a serious accusation might wish to consider their situations carefully before making any disclosure, especially where the circumstances appear suspicious but it cannot be assumed that they are rational and articulate. In many cases, suspects may be emotional, perhaps panicked, inarticulate, unintelligent, easily influenced, confused or frightened or a combination of these. They may be unable to do themselves justice. Such persons may be well advised to hold their peace, at least at an early stage. They may, of course, have something to hide, but that something may simply be shameful and not a crime, or it may implicate others for whom they feel responsible. The supposition that only a guilty person has a reason for not speaking freely to investigating police is an unreasonable assumption.

It is also important to note that anything said to an Australian police member should be corroborated, especially by way of video or audio tape. If it is not so corroborated it will be admitted only under exceptional circumstances, S.464H (2)(a) of the Crimes Act 1958 (Vic), and where the circumstances, on the balance of probabilities, justify the reception of the evidence, S.464H (2)(b) of the Crimes Act 1958 (Vic). While initially the police were insulted by this ruling most have now come to find it useful as a way of proving that they did not invent a false, verbal confession, never made by an accused (a practice called "verballing" an accused).

There are numerous statutory abrogations of the right, particularly in the area of bankruptcy. It is also not available to witnesses testifying before a Royal Commission. There are also abrogations of the right in recent Federal anti-terrorism and Victorian organised crime Acts. Each of these acts set up coercive questioning regimes which operate outside the normal criminal processes. Direct testimonial evidence gained from this coercive questioning cannot be used in any subsequent criminal trial of the person providing the evidence, however a witness who testifies in his defense at a subsequent criminal trial who provides a different testimony to that during the questioning may face prosecution for perjury.

== States ==
Some states have enacted legislation that modifies the right to silence in those states.

=== New South Wales ===
The state of New South Wales passed the Evidence Amendment (Evidence of Silence) Act 2013 which allows the judiciary to direct the jury to draw unfavourable inferences against a defendant who failed or refused to mention a fact during police questioning that they later rely on in court in a bid to be found not guilty. The law strictly applies to those over the age of 18 and who have an Australian legal practitioner physically present and available at the time of questioning. The change is designed to reflect reforms made in the United Kingdom in 1994 and only applies to indictable offences that carry a penalty of five or more years imprisonment. The introduction of the Evidence Amendment (Evidence of Silence) Act 2013 sparked some controversy and concern amongst legal scholars and practitioners.

The current caution used in New South Wales is:

You are not obliged to say or do anything unless you wish to do so, but whatever you say or do may be used in evidence. Do you understand?

=== Queensland ===
The current caution used in Queensland is:

Before I ask you any questions I must tell you that you have the right to remain silent.

This means you do not have to say anything, answer any question or make any statement unless you wish to do so.

However, if you do say something or make a statement, it may later be used as evidence. Do you understand?

== Bibliography ==
- "Traditional Rights and Freedoms -Encroachments by Commonwealth Law" (PDF). ALRC Interim Report (127). Australian Law Reform Commission. July 2015. ISBN 978-0-9943202-0-9.
- "Azzopardi v R [2001] HCA 25; 205 CLR 50; 179 ALR 349; 75 ALJR 931 (3 May 2001)". www.austlii.edu.au.
- Dixon, David; Cowdery, Nicholas (2013). "Silence Rights" (PDF). Australian Indigenous Law Review. 17 (1): 23–37.
- Frauenfelder, Simon (April 2019). "Compulsorily obtained material and interference with criminal processes". Criminal Law Journal. 43 (2): 101–129.
- Garland, Norman M. (1996). "The Unavailability to Corporations of the Privilege against Self-Incrimination: A Comparative Examination". New York Law School Journal of International and Comparative Law. 16: 55.
- "Report 95 (2000) - The right to silence". Lawlink New South Wales. Law Reform Commission, New South Wales. 2000. Archived from the original on 14 March 2012.
- "Evidence Act 1995, S89A". AustLIINew South Wales Consolidated Acts. Legislature of New South Wales. 1995.
- "Evidence Amendment (Evidence of Silence) Act 2013 No 9". www.austlii.edu.au. Legislature of New South Wales. 2013.
- "Report on the Right to Silence" (PDF). Northern Territory Law Reform Committee. 2002. Archived from the original (PDF) on 2 September 2007.
- O'Farrell, Barry (14 August 2012). "Media Release: Crime Crackdown: "Right to Silence Law Toughened"" (PDF). NSW Government. Archived from the original (PDF) on 1 March 2017.
- "The Right to Silence: An Examination of the Issues". Parliament of Victoria. June 1998. Archived from the original on 7 January 2006.
- "Police Powers and Responsibilities Regulation 2012". Queensland Legislation. Queensland Government. 2012.
