= Ex officio oath =

Procedure of the English court of Star Chamber

The ex officio oath developed in the first half of the 17th century (1600 to 1650) in England, and was used as a form of coercion, persecution, and forcible self-incrimination in the religious trials of that era. It took the form of a religious oath made by the accused prior to questioning by the Star Chamber, to answer truthfully all questions that might be asked. It gave rise to what became known as the cruel trilemma where the accused would find themselves trapped between a breach of religious oath (taken extremely seriously in that era, a mortal sin, and perjury), or contempt of court for silence, or self-incrimination. The name derives from the questioner putting the accused on oath ex officio, meaning by virtue of his office or position. Outcry against this practice (particularly in the trials of John Lilburne ("Freeborn John") around 1630–1649) led to the establishment of the right to not incriminate oneself in common law. This was the direct precursor of similar rights in modern law, including the right to silence and non-self-incrimination in the Fifth Amendment to the United States Constitution. The right itself appears as item 16 in the Levellers Agreement of the Free People of England (1649) and first appeared in US law in the Massachusetts Body of Liberties and the Connecticut Code of the same era. The Star Chamber itself, as a judicial body, was abolished by Parliament as part of the Habeas Corpus Act 1640.

== Early history ==
During the Middle Ages the jurisdiction of ecclesiastical courts was limited by a 14th century statute called Articuli Cleri, while the later Prohibitio formata de statuto Articuli cleri, also during the reign of Edward II, specified the exclusive jurisdiction of the King's Courts.

Leonard Levy wrote in Origins of the Fifth Amendment that self-incriminating oaths were banned by statute, but Henry A. Kelly noted the limited jurisdictional scope of the statute only limited the oath to matrimonial and testamentary cases. According to the Chronica Majora, when the king wrote to his sheriff, after an outcry from the people against the inquisitions of bishop Robert Grosseteste, instructing that no laymen should be compelled to answer under oath except in cases of matrimony or testaments, the bishop accused the king of conspiracy comparing his "audacious" behavior to events in France.

John Wigmore also said the oath was still permitted:

"There is no reason whatever to believe that the statute De Articulis Cleri had among its motives any animus against the church's imposition of an oath as such."

The Church continued to oppose statutory limitations being imposed upon its jurisdiction over heresy. The Suppression of Heresy Act 1400 targeting Lollardy authorized arrests and imprisonment, with cooperation between secular and ecclesiastical courts in the prosecution of heretics continuing for over a century, and including burning at the stake carried out by secular authorities when heretics refused to abjure heretical opinions as required by the laws of the church.

Thomas Fuller wrote about heresy and treason during the Oldcastle Revolt:

...he was not only guilty of heresy, but treason. But, by the way, it appeareth that Lollardism, then counted heresy, was made treason by statute, and on that account heresy and treason signify no more than heresy; and then heresy, according to the abusive language of that age was the best serving of God in those days.

Opposition to the clergy putting suspected heretics to question under oath continued. During the reign of Henry VIII papal jurisdiction over heresy was limited by statute by the An Act abolishing diversity in opinions in 1538. Mary Queen of Scots restored the papal jurisdiction over heresy, until an Elizabethan statute placed ecclesiastical offices in Crown jurisdiction. Several cases were reported by Edward Coke regarding persons imprisoned by the ecclesiastical judges of the High Commission for refusal to answer them under oath. According to Coke the Common Bench released them according to habeas corpus.

== Privilege against self-incrimination ==
According to scholars of the common law the right against self-incrimination begins with opposition to punishments and penalties imposed for refusing to answer ecclesiastical judges under oath without formal charges being made. Noting inconsistences in cases reported by Edward Coke and James Dyer, E.M. Morgan wrote:

All that can be safely asserted is that the common lawyers both in the second half of the 13th and all of the 14th century and under Henry VIII and Elizabeth resisted the inquisatiorial [sic] procedure of the spiritual courts, whether Romish or English, and under Elizabeth began to base their opposition chiefly upon the principle that a person could not be compelled to furnish under oath answers to charges which had not been formally made and disclosed to him, except in causes testamentary and matrimoinal. [sic]

Early examples of a codified right appears in the Levellers manifesto Agreement of the Free People of England (published 1 May 1649): "[I]t shall not be in the power of any Representative, to punish, or cause to be punished, any person or persons for refusing to answer questions against themselves in Criminall cases". John Wigmore and Mary Hume Macguire considered the jurisdictional conflict between common law and the ecclesiastical oath ex officio the starting point for the privilege against self-incrimination. According to Mary Hume Maguire:

We read a series of petitions from the Commons to the Crown referring to the distasteful practice of ecclesiastical courts of proving the case against the defendant by "fishing interrogatories viva voce"

The right later takes on a different meaning: based on the text of the Fifth Amendment, an accused person facing formal charges is not required to be a witness against themselves in Court.

The United States Supreme Court summarized the events of the time as part of the historical background in the landmark case Miranda v. Arizona:

Perhaps the critical historical event shedding light on its [i.e., the privilege against self-incrimination] origins and evolution was the trial of one John Lilburn, a vocal anti-Stuart Leveller, who was made to take the Star Chamber Oath in 1637. The oath would have bound him to answer to all questions posed to him on any subject. He resisted the oath and declaimed the proceedings, stating: "Another fundamental right I then contended for, was, that no man's conscience ought to be racked by oaths imposed, to answer to questions concerning himself in matters criminal, or pretended to be so." On account of the Lilburn Trial, Parliament abolished the inquisitorial Court of Star Chamber and went further in giving him generous reparation. The lofty principles to which Lilburn had appealed during his trial gained popular acceptance in England. These sentiments worked their way over to the Colonies and were implanted after great struggle into the Bill of Rights.

== See also ==
- Ecclesiastical law
- Inquisition
- History of human rights
- Right to silence in England and Wales
- Hale Commission
