= Right to silence =

Right to refuse to answer questions

The right to silence is a legal principle which guarantees any individual the right to refuse to answer questions from law enforcement officers or court officials. It is a legal right recognised, explicitly or by convention, in many of the world's legal systems.

The right covers a number of issues centered on the right of the accused or the defendant to refuse to comment or provide an answer when questioned, either prior to or during legal proceedings in a court of law. This can be the right to avoid self-incrimination or the right to remain silent when questioned. The right may include the provision that adverse inferences cannot be made by the judge or jury regarding the refusal by a defendant to answer questions before or during a trial, hearing or any other legal proceeding. This right constitutes only a small part of the defendant's rights as a whole.

The origin of the right to silence is attributed to Sir Edward Coke's challenge to the ecclesiastical courts and their ex officio oath. In the late 17th century, it became established in the law of England as a reaction to the excesses of the royal inquisitions in these courts. In the United States, informing suspects of their right to remain silent and of the consequences for giving up that right forms a key part of the Miranda warning.

== History ==
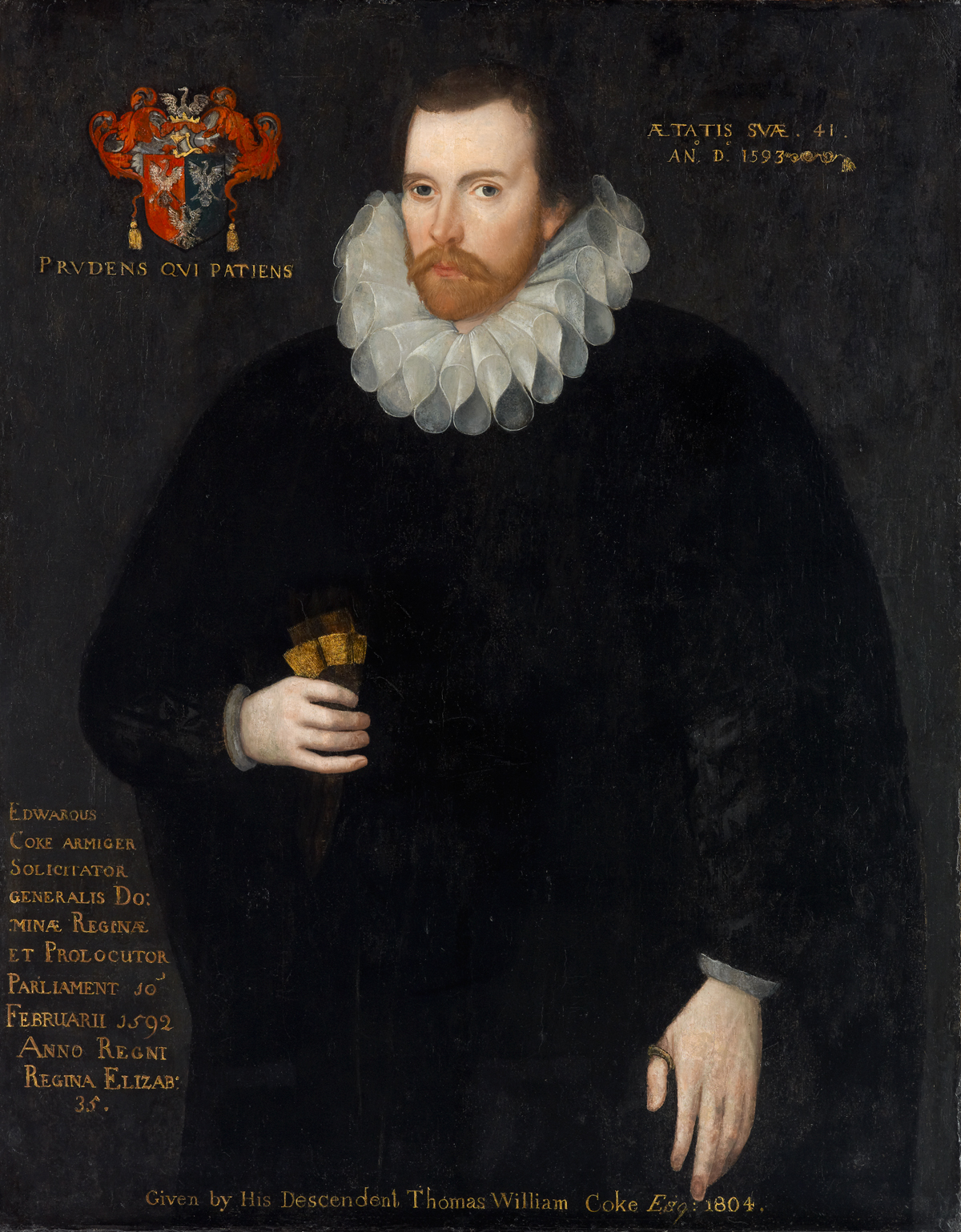
Portrait of English judge Sir Edward Coke

Neither the reasons nor the history behind the right to silence are entirely clear. The Latin brocard nemo tenetur se ipsum accusare ('no man is bound to accuse himself') became a rallying cry for religious and political dissidents who were prosecuted in the Star Chamber and High Commission of 16th-century England. People coming before these tribunals were forced to make the ex officio oath by which they swore to truthfully answer the questions to be put before them without knowing what they were being accused of. This created what has been termed the cruel trilemma whereby these accused were forced to choose between committing the mortal sin of perjury (if they lied under oath to protect themselves), harsh punishment for contempt of court (if they refused to answer), or betraying their "natural" duty of self-preservation (if they told the truth to honour their oath). Sir Edward Coke's challenge to the ecclesiastical courts and their ex officio oath is seen as the origin of the right to silence. With his decision that common law courts could issue writs of prohibition against such oaths and his arguments that such oaths were contrary to the common law (as found in his Reports and Institutes), Coke "dealt the crucial blow to the oath ex officio and to the High Commission".

After the parliamentary revolutions of the late 17th century, according to some historical accounts, the right to silence became established in the law as a reaction to the excesses of the royal inquisitions in these courts. The rejection of the procedures of the Courts of Star Chamber and High Commission eventually resulted in the emergence of the principle, according to US jurist and law of evidence expert John Henry Wigmore, "that no man is bound to incriminate himself, on any charge (no matter how properly instituted), or in any Court (not merely in the ecclesiastical or Star Chamber tribunals)". It was extended during the English Restoration (from 1660 on) to include "an ordinary witness, and not merely the party charged".

However, the right to silence was not always a practical reality for all accused in the English courts for some period afterwards. With limited access to legal counsel (often depending on the social status of the accused), a shifting standard of proof, and a system generally distrustful of silent defendants, a criminal accused who remained silent was often believed to be guilty and was sentenced. Nevertheless, it remained a basic right available to the accused and has been an accepted practice over the past few centuries. In England, the practice of judicial questioning of accused persons at trial (as distinct from questioning prior to trial), did not really disappear until well into the 18th century, but by the 19th century, the accused were not allowed to give evidence on oath even if they wanted to – also said to be a reaction to the inequities of the Star Chamber and High Commission.

In countries formerly part of the British Empire (such as Commonwealth nations, the United States and Ireland) the right to silence has remained enshrined in the common-law tradition inherited from England. The two different but diverging paths along which these rights evolved and operate in Anglo-American jurisprudence (one through rights expressed in an entrenched constitution, the other in Acts of Parliament specifying rights or protections at common law) can be seen today in Commonwealth nations like New Zealand, where police officers are still required at common law to issue "Miranda-style" warnings (but which are completely unrelated to the US Miranda warning ruling) and inform arrested persons that they do not have to answer any questions but that whatever they do say (or do) can be used in court as evidence. The police must also determine whether the arrested persons understand these rights. Any failure to do so can jeopardise a criminal prosecution. While differing slightly from the wording used in the US, the intent is identical and comes from the inherited tradition of law. However, in Australia for instance, anything said by the accused under police questioning while in custody will generally not be accepted into evidence unless it is corroborated, generally by audio or video record. Australian police all wear chest cams as part of their standard issue, and turn them on with every interaction, so that they record and provide such evidence.

As in the US, suspects in some Commonwealth countries are also entitled to have counsel present during questioning. In England and Wales, laws introduced in 1994 have the suspects told they have the right to remain silent, but are now also cautioned that anything they do not reveal in questioning, but later rely upon in court may harm their defence. In other words, in some cases inferences can be drawn. The right to counsel, which also became increasingly entrenched in the US following the American Revolution, gave defendants a practical method of mounting a defence while remaining silent, and the development of the modern police force in the early 19th century opened up the question of pretrial silence for the first time. The key American case of Bram v. United States paved the way for the right to be extended to pretrial questioning, and the practice of "Miranda warnings" became established in the US and elsewhere following the case of Miranda v. Arizona in 1966.

While initially alien to inquisitorial justice systems, the right to silence spread across continental Europe, in some form, throughout the late 20th century, due to developments in international law which had an increasing universalisation of certain due process protections.

== Worldwide ==
Warnings of a right to remain silent are given in approximately 108 nations around the world.

=== Australia ===
Australia has no constitutional protection for the right to silence, but it is broadly recognised by State and Federal Crimes Acts and Codes and is regarded by the courts as an important common law right and a part of the privilege against self-incrimination. In general, criminal suspects in Australia have the right to refuse to answer questions posed to them by police before trial and to refuse to give evidence at trial. As a general rule judges cannot direct juries to draw adverse inferences from a defendant's silence (Petty v R) but there are exceptions to this rule, most notably in cases which rely entirely on circumstantial evidence which it is only possible for the defendant to testify about (Weissensteiner v R). This exception has been abolished in Victoria by sections 42 and 44 of the Jury Directions Act 2015. The right does not apply to corporations (EPA v Caltex).

Within Australia, the right to silence derives from common law's Companion rule. The basic position is adverse inference may not be drawn about the defendant's culpability, where he/she does not answer police questions. While this is the common law position, it is buttressed by various legislative provisions. Some investigations can strip the right, such as those undertaken by the Independent Commission Against Corruption.

=== Bangladesh ===
Article 33 of the Constitution of Bangladesh discusses the rights of the arrested and detained; no right to silence is mentioned either in the Constitution or the Bangladesh Penal Code, except in Article 35(4) of the Constitution, which protects individuals from self-implication. To facilitate protection from self-implication, Bangladesh Penal Code makes an exception in cases of confessions, in which case, the Magistrate obtaining a confession under Section 164 must explain the confessor's right to silence, and must attest to the fact that the rights of the confessor were read out to him and explained, and the confessor waived his right of silence.

Article 33 of the Constitution of Bangladesh compels arresting authorities to inform the accused of the accusations brought against him before he is detained, and that the detained must be presented to the nearest court within 24 hours. Exceptions to this rule include preventive detention and the arrest of an enemy alien. Right to counsel is an inalienable right, but the arresting officer need not explicitly state it to the detained.

Article 35(4) of the Constitution protects individuals from self-implication. Therefore, warnings must be read out to the detained person if he wants to voluntarily confess to the charges; in this case, a Magistrate must read and explain the confessor's right to silence and protection from self-implication, and attest to the fact that the rights of the confessor were read out to him and explained, and the confessor waived his right of silence.

=== Canada ===
In Canada, the right to silence is protected under the common law confessions rule, and section 7 and section 11(c) of the Canadian Charter of Rights and Freedoms. The accused may not be compelled as a witness against himself in criminal proceedings, and therefore only voluntary statements made to police are admissible as evidence. Prior to an accused being informed of their right to legal counsel, any statements they make to police are considered involuntarily compelled and are inadmissible as evidence. After being informed of the right to counsel, the accused may choose to voluntarily answer questions and those statements would be admissible.

These rights to silence exist only when the suspect is knowingly dealing with a person in authority. When the subject is unaware he is dealing with the police, such as in the case of an undercover operation, these protections do not exist unless the authority figure actively elicits a statement. Statements made to police officers during undercover operations almost always comply with the confessions rule unless the conduct of the police was deemed so egregious that it would "shock the community." However, section 7 rights might still become implicated in the case of elicitation, after which a court could only admit the statement if it is satisfied that it would not bring the administration of justice into disrepute.

Under the Charter, an arrested person has the right:

- To be informed promptly of the reasons therefor.
- To retain and instruct counsel without delay and be informed of that right.
- To have the validity of the detention determined by way of habeas corpus and to be released if the detention is not lawful.

The Canadian Charter warning reads (varies by police service):

"You are under arrest for _________ (charge); do you understand? You have the right to retain and instruct counsel without delay. We will provide you with a toll-free telephone lawyer referral service, if you do not have your own lawyer. Anything you do say can and will be used in court as evidence. Do you understand? Would you like to speak to a lawyer?"

A more detailed version:

I am arresting you for (charge). It is my duty to inform you that you have the right to retain and instruct counsel without delay. You may call any lawyer you want. There is a 24-hour telephone service available which provides a legal aid duty lawyer who can give you legal advice in private. This advice is given without charge and the lawyer can explain the legal aid plan to you. If you wish to contact a legal aid duty lawyer, I can provide you with a telephone number. Do you understand? Do you want to call a lawyer? You are not obliged to say anything, but anything you do say may be given in evidence in court.

Section 14 of the Charter further provides that a translator must be made available so that the person can understand the proceedings against them. This right to a translator extends to the deaf. In Quebec, the Charter warning is read in Canadian French. In New Brunswick and Ottawa, the warning is read in either English or French, and the officer is required to ask the person's language of preference before issuing the warning. In the rest of Canada, the Charter warning is read in Canadian English.

While Section 10(b) of the Charter guarantees the right to be provided legal counsel, Canadian law only entitles criminal suspects under the age of 18 to have counsel actually be present throughout the entire interrogation. Once an adult suspect has asserted their right to counsel, the police are obliged to hold off in attempting to obtain evidence until the suspect has had a reasonable opportunity to contact legal counsel. However, after that opportunity has been exhausted, there is no guarantee of further access until the interrogation is over. Additionally, even if the suspect directly asserts his decision to remain silent, the police may continue the interrogation. There is no automatic exclusion of evidence obtained after such an assertion, however it risks breaching the confessions rule if a court finds that it created reasonable doubt to whether the confession was obtained under "oppressive conditions," a determination which is made upon the totality of evidence.

A leading case on the right to silence in Canada is R. v. Singh, where a person in police custody invoked his right to silence 18 times yet was continually questioned. In a 5–4 majority, the Canadian Supreme Court ruled that there was no ancillary right under section 7 to have the police stop questioning a suspect after the asserted their right to silence. The court did, however, acknowledge that repeated police questioning after a defendant has asserted their right to silence raises doubts regarding the admissibility of further evidence under the confessions rule, though that was not the finding in the case. Another Supreme Court case, R. v. Hodgson, clarified that the right to silence only applied to the state and could not be used to exclude confessions made to private actors.

Although an accused has the right to remain silent and may not be compelled to testify against themselves, where an accused freely chooses to take the witness box and testify, there is no further right to silence and no general restriction on what kinds of questions they may be required to answer. Section 13 of the Canadian Charter of Rights and Freedoms guarantees that witnesses may not have any incriminating evidence they gave as testimony used against them in separate proceedings. In effect, a person can be compelled to give involuntary self-incriminating evidence, but only where that evidence is to be used against a third party.

In the past, most cases, except for certain sex offences or where the victims were children, spouses could not be compelled to testify against each other. However, after Bill C-32, The Victim's Bill of Rights Act, this is no longer the case. Spouses retain the right to assert privilege, and to refuse to answer questions about communications during the marriage.

=== China ===
The right of silence is not guaranteed by law in China. Article 93 of the Criminal Procedure Law states that "The criminal suspect shall answer the investigators' questions truthfully, but he shall have the right to refuse to answer any questions that are irrelevant to the case." But since the 1996 amendments to the Criminal Procedure Law, Article 52 states that "It shall be strictly prohibited to extort confessions by torture, gather evidence by threat, enticement, deceit, or other illegal means, or force anyone to commit self-incrimination." In 2012 the law was also re-amended to include clauses that protect human rights. China has recognised the right against self-incrimination and forced confessions are prohibited by law. The signing of the International Covenant on Civil and Political Rights in 1998, also guarantees Chinese citizens the right against self-incrimination, however the treaty has not been ratified in China.

=== Czech Republic ===
The Czech Republic protects the right to silence by two clauses in the Charter of Fundamental Rights and Freedoms. Article 37, clause 1 states that "everyone has the right to refuse a statement if he/she would cause risk of prosecution of himself/herself or a close person". In Article 40, clause 4, it is stated that "an accused person has the right to refuse a statement; he/she must not be deprived of this right in any way".

=== European Union ===
Within the European Union, a gradual process of harmonising the laws of all the states of the Union has resulted in the adoption a common letter of rights that will apply to everyone across the European Union. The agreed law—also known as "the Reding Rights" taking the name of the EU Justice Commissioner Viviane Reding, who has proposed and negotiated the measure to become law across the entire European Union—will mean that suspects in the European Union will once detained receive a "Letter of Rights listing their basic rights during criminal proceedings".

The European law ensures that people suspected of a criminal offence receive adequate information about their basic rights during criminal proceedings. These are the right to a lawyer; to be informed of the charge; to interpretation and translation for those who do not understand the language of the proceedings; the right to remain silent and to be brought promptly before a court following arrest.

In particular, the law includes five innovations:

Suspects will be informed of their rights following the arrest;
They will be given a "letter of rights" spelling out their rights in writing;
The letter of rights will be easy to understand, without legal jargon;
It will be made available in a language the suspect understands;
It will contain practical details about the person's rights.

These rights are contained in a letter of rights—"the Reding Rights"—a printed document given to suspects after they are detained and before interrogation. The European Union law, proposed in July 2010 by the European Commission, was adopted by the European Parliament and Council in December 2011. The European Union Directive was published officially on 1 June 2012 in the Official Journal of the European Union L 142, 1 June 2012. It became operational across the European Union by 2 June 2014.

=== European Convention on Human Rights ===
The concept of right to silence is not specifically mentioned in the European Convention on Human Rights but the European Court of Human Rights has held that

the right to remain silent under police questioning and the privilege against self-incrimination are generally recognised international standards which lie at the heart of the notion of a fair procedure under Article 6.

=== France ===
In France, any person brought in police custody (garde à vue) must be informed of the maximal duration of the custody, and a number of rights, in a language that this person understands. Among these rights are: the possibility of warning a relative or employer of the custody, that of asking to be examined by a physician, and that of discussing the case with a lawyer.

The French Code of Criminal Procedure (art. L116) makes it compulsory that when an investigating judge hears a suspect, he must warn him that he has the right to remain silent, to make a statement, or to answer questions. A person against which suspicions lay cannot legally be interrogated by justice as an ordinary witness.

At the actual trial, a defendant can be compelled to make a statement. However, the code also prohibits hearing a suspect under oath; thus, a suspect may say whatever he feels fit for his defence, without fear of sanction for perjury. This prohibition is extended to the suspect's spouse and members of his close family (this extension of the prohibition may be waived if both the prosecution and the defence counsel agree to the waiver).

Since 15 April 2011, any person held by the police has new rights:

- The person is immediately informed by a police officer, or in the presence of one, in a language that he can understand, that (Article 3):
  - he has the right to ask assistance of a lawyer (63-3-1 to 63-4-3 of Penal Procedure code);
  - he has the right, after answering questions about his identity, to answer other questions or to remain silent.
- From the beginning of custody, the person can ask for the assistance of a lawyer (Article 6).
- The conversation with the lawyer has to remain confidential (Article 7).
- The lawyer has the right to access some of the documents related to the procedure and to be present at any police interview of the suspect made by the police (Article 8).

Witnesses under indictment (or who are cited as suspects) cannot be heard under oath, and thus do not risk prosecution for perjury. Such witnesses must be assisted by an attorney, and must be informed of these rights when heard by the judiciary. Suspects brought before a Juge d'instruction must be informed of their right to remain silent, to make statements, or to answer questions. In all cases, an attorney can be designated by the head of the bar if necessary.

=== Germany ===
According to § 136 Strafprozessordnung (StPO, i.e. Criminal Procedure Code) a suspect, arrested or not, has to be informed before any interrogation about their right to remain silent. Though the police and courts may not draw inference from the complete silence of the accused in any stage of criminal proceedings, inference may be drawn if the accused is selectively silent. Suspects cannot be heard under oath.

Before any interrogation begins a suspect, arrested or not, must be informed:

- Of the crime for which he is charged
- About his right to remain silent
- About his right to consult an attorney before the interview
- About his right to name any evidence in his favour

Foreign suspects have the following additional rights:

- Translation assistance, and
- Consular assistance

A person against which exist plausible causes of suspicion can be interrogated as an ordinary witness in criminal proceedings against another person. However, in this case according to § 55 StPO, the witness can refuse to answer questions which could incriminate themselves (or one of their relatives). The suspicious witness also must be cautioned about the right to remain silent. Suspicious witnesses cannot be heard under oath.

However, the German constitutional court has decided that the much more strict UK laws, in which complete silence of the accused can be used against him depending on additional evidence, are compatible with the German constitution. Thus, Germany may extradite persons to the UK. It also implies that changing the German laws towards those of the UK would not violate the German constitution.

=== Hong Kong ===
The right to silence is protected according to the Hong Kong Bill of Rights Ordinance and common law. The "Rules and Directions for the Questioning of Suspects and the Taking of Statements" (Rules and Directions), promulgated by the then Secretary for Security in 1992, stipulate that the caution to be used to remind a suspect of his right to remain silent when he is questioned. The statement can be read in English, Cantonese or Mandarin:

English: "You are not obliged to say anything unless you wish to do so but what you say may be put into writing and given in evidence."

Cantonese: 「唔係是必要你講嘅，除非你自己想講喇，但係你所講嘅嘢，可能用筆寫低及用嚟做證供嘅。」

Mandarin: 「你不一定要說話，除非你有話要說。但是，你說的話可能會寫下來及用作證據。」

This is similar to the caution given in England and Wales prior to the passage of the Criminal Justice and Public Order Act 1994.

The Hong Kong Bill of Rights Ordinance states that all persons accused of a crime cannot be compelled to testify against themselves nor admit guilt.

According to Jessica Wing-kay Chiu (Chinese: 趙穎琦), then a PhD candidate of the University of Hong Kong, the law does not codify the exact procedure for law enforcement to serve a notice to the right to silence.

=== India ===
The Constitution of India guarantees every person the right against self incrimination under Article 20 (3): "No person accused of any offence shall be compelled to be a witness against himself". It is well established that the Right against self incrimination has been granted to the accused by virtue of the pronouncement in the case of Nandini Sathpathy vs P. L. Dani, no one can forcibly extract statements from the accused, who has the right against self incrimination, not only in the court of law but also during interrogation. In 2010, the Supreme court found that forced narco-analysis, brain mapping and lie detector tests violate Article 20(3).

=== Israel ===
In Israel, according to Sections 28 (Hearing arguments of the detainee) and Section 31 (Explanation of rights to the detainee) of the Criminal Procedure Law (Enforcement Authority—Arrests) 1996, an officer arresting or interrogating a suspect must duly warn him first that he does not have to say any thing that may incriminate him, and that anything he will say may be used against him. According to Israeli law, the exercise of the right to remain silent may be considered as supplemental evidence in most cases, and this fact also needs to be explained to the suspect. Also the officer needs to inform the suspect that he has the right to notify a family member or acquaintance and a lawyer of his arrest, his right for counsel, and the duration he can be held before he is released or brought before a judge.

A defendant's refusal to testify at trial may add weight to the prosecution's case unless an expert witness testifies that the defendant is a person with mental or psychological disabilities.

Israeli law has not adopted the "Fruits of the Poisoned Tree" doctrine, and flaws in the process of collecting it affect only the weight of tainted evidence. However, in Criminal Appeal 5121/98, Issaharov v. The Military Prosecutor, a court ruled that the defendant's confession, given without proper warning regarding the right of representation, was not considered as given with consent and free will, and was not accepted by the court.

=== Japan ===
According to the Constitution of Japan under Article 38(1), no person is forced to testify against themselves.

=== Latvia ===
In Latvia, the Criminal procedure law (Kriminālprocesa likums) (sections 60.2, 150, 265, and more) sets out a right for anyone against whom criminal proceedings has been initiated or suspicions raised to remain silent. Upon arrest and before first interrogation of a person against whom any (official or unofficial) suspicion has been raised in a criminal case, such person must be warned of his or her right to remain silent, and that everything such person says may be used against that person in a criminal proceedings. Witnesses, victims and persons whose property rights has been affected by criminal proceedings has a right not to incriminate oneself and his or her relatives and not to give any information that is directly or indirectly self-incriminating or may incriminate such persons' relatives. Refusal to testify or answer all or any questions on the basis of right against self-incrimination cannot be used against such person in any way or be used as evidence of guilt. No judge, prosecutor, investigator or any other public body may draw adverse inferences about a person from exercising a right against self-incrimination. Outside criminal proceedings right against self-incrimination is honoured as long-standing unwritten general principle of law in all quasi-criminal (such as administrative offence law) and public proceedings, which has been repeatedly upheld by legal precedent and case law.

=== Netherlands ===
In the Netherlands, each accused suspect has the right to remain silent to questions of the police and the prosecutor, during interrogation or investigation at the hearing. According to Dutch law, only the police officer will read the rights of the suspect in the police station. Security guards have the right to put somebody under arrest, but they have to hand over the suspect immediately to the police officer who will read the rights of the suspect later in the station. The rights are: to remain silent, the right to have an attorney, the right to have access to some files coming from the criminal dossier, and the right to make contact to an attorney.

The accused must co-operate in providing material which exists independent of the will of a suspect. For example, a suspect must co-operate in giving a blood, breath, or DNA sample. A suspect can also be compelled to provide biometric access to electronic devices.

=== New Zealand ===
In New Zealand, the right of persons arrested to refrain from making a statement and to be informed of that right is contained in the Bill of Rights Act 1990, as further reflected in a practice note on police questioning issued in 2006, by then Chief Justice Sian Elias. The Evidence Act 2006 explicitly prohibits the inference of guilt in a criminal proceeding from a defendant exercising their right to silence. At common law the leading case is Taylor v New Zealand Poultry Board where Justice Cooke held, "The starting point ... [is], unless an Act of Parliament imposes or authorises the imposition of a duty to the contrary, every citizen has in general a right to refuse to answer questions from anyone, including an official."

The obligation to caution arises when:

- a suspect is in custody;
- when police have enough evidence to believe the person has committed an offence;
- when detained, such as for the execution of a statutory or common law power of search or in the execution of drink driving investigations;
- other situations as dictated by statute or case law.

The caution to be given to adults is as follows:

You have the right to remain silent and do not have to make any statement. Anything you say will be recorded and may be given in evidence in court. You have the right to speak with a lawyer without delay and in private before deciding whether to answer any questions. Police have a list of lawyers you may speak to for free. If you wish to speak to a lawyer, a telephone will be made available to you for that purpose as soon as practicable. You will be allowed a reasonable time to consult and instruct a lawyer from the time a telephone is made available to you.

The caution in Māori is as follows:

Kei te kōrero au ki a koe mō te/Kua mau koe e te ture mō te/Kua hopu koe e te ture mō te [offence]. He tika tāu ki te noho wahangū. Kāore he here i runga i a koe ki te whakaputa kōrero. Ka hopukina ō kōrero, ā, tērā pea ka whakaputahia hei taunakitanga i te kōti. He tika tāu ki te kōrero wawe ki tētahi rōia i roto i te tapu i mua i te whakarite ki te whakautu pātai. He rārangi rōia tā ngā pirihimana hei kōrerotanga māu mō te kore utu.

=== Norway ===
According to Straffeprosessloven (Criminal Procedures Code), a defendant cannot be obliged to testify(§90). Further; no promises, inaccurate information, threats or coercion can be used. The same applies to any means which reduces the defendants consciousness or his ability to self-determination. Any interrogation must not have as a goal to wear out the defendant(§92). However, if the defendant decides not to testify, the judge may advise him that it may in certain circumstances be held against him(§93).

In general, anyone is required to appear before the courts and give testimony, except dictated otherwise by the law(§108)
There are some notable exceptions:
§119: The court may not hear evidence from a priest in the Norwegian Church, or indeed any priest or similar in any registered faith, lawyers, defence attorneys, arbitrators in marriage affairs, medical doctors, psychologists, nurses, midwives or apothecaries, except with the explicit permission of the person entitled to silence, concerning anything they have learnt during the performance of their function. The above does not apply if testimony is required to prevent someone from being wrongfully convicted(§119). Catholic priests have refused to testify about information obtained in confession even in these cases, and the Supreme Court has not sanctioned this.
§121: Even if the relationship is not regulated by §119, the courts may relieve a witness of the duty to testify concerning information obtained in counselling, social work, medical care, judicial assistance "or similar".
§122: A defendants spouse, relatives in directly ascending or descending order, siblings and their spouses are not required to give testimony. The same applies to separated or divorced spouses, or people living in a "marriage like" relationship, e.g. common-law marriages. The court may extend this right to fiancees, foster-parents/children/siblings.
§123: A witness may refuse to answer questions leading to self-incrimination either for the witness itself, or for anyone related to the witness as described by §122.
§124: A witness may refuse to answer questions relating to business secrets. The court may oblige the witness to testify after consideration.
§125: The editor of a printed magazine/newspaper may refuse to divulge the writer of any articles in his journal, or sources for its content.

=== Pakistan ===
Article 13 of the 1973 Constitution of Pakistan protects a person, when accused of an offence, from self-incrimination.

=== Philippines ===
The 1987 Constitution of the Philippines, in section 12(1) of Article 3 (Bill of Rights), states:

Any person under investigation for the commission of an offense shall have the right to be informed of his right to remain silent and to have competent and independent counsel preferably of his own choice. If the person cannot afford the services of counsel, he must be provided with one. These rights cannot be waived except in writing and in the presence of counsel.

This was expanded into a caution during arrest under Republic Act 7438. Previously, informing arrested persons of their rights occurred long after arrest, if it ever occurred at all.

Any public officer or employee, or anyone acting under his order or his place, who arrests, detains or investigates any person for the commission of an offense shall inform the latter, in a language known to and understood by him, of his rights to remain silent and to have competent and independent counsel, preferably of his own choice, who shall at all times be allowed to confer privately with the person arrested, detained or under custodial investigation. If such person cannot afford the services of his own counsel, he must be provided with a competent and independent counsel by the investigating officer.

— Section 2(b), RA7438

Section 17 of the Bill of Rights further states that "[n]o person shall be compelled to be a witness against himself", meaning a person has the right not to serve as a witness in cases in which they are the defendant so as to avoid self-incrimination.

Punishments for law enforcement officers who fail to read suspects their rights, under RA7438, are severe: besides a fine of 6,000 Philippine pesos, officials may be jailed for between eight and ten years.

In the 1999 case People vs Mahinay, G.R. No. 122485, the Supreme Court of the Philippines was asked to consider the case of Larry Mahinay y Amparado, a man convicted of the rape and murder of a 12-year-old girl, the neighbour of his employer. Mahinay confessed but later retracted his confession, claiming that he made it due to fear surrounding his imprisonment and not actual guilt. Mahinay claimed that the police officers attacked him and threatened to kill him if he would not confess, and they did not inform him of his right to remain silent until after he had already confessed and all that remained was to sign the confession.

There was no physical evidence to back up Mahinay's claims, and his attorney claimed that Mahinay was read his rights before he confessed. In its decision to affirm Mahinay's conviction, the court declared:

There being no evidence presented to show that said confession were obtained as a result of violence, torture, maltreatment, intimidation, threat or promise of reward or leniency nor that the investigating officer could have been motivated to concoct the facts narrated in said affidavit; the confession of the accused is held to be true, correct and freely or voluntarily given.

But the court also declared the following, which has since become a landmark decision in the rights of the accused in the Philippines, and is sometimes referred to as the Mahinay doctrine:

It is high-time to educate our law-enforcement agencies who neglect either by ignorance or indifference the so-called Miranda rights which had become insufficient and which the Court must update in the light of new legal developments:

1. The person arrested, detained, invited or under custodial investigation must be informed in a language known to and understood by him of the reason for the arrest and he must be shown the warrant of arrest, if any; Every other warnings, information or communication must be in a language known to and understood by said person;
2. He must be warned that he has a right to remain silent and that any statement he makes may be used as evidence against him;
3. He must be informed that he has the right to be assisted at all times and have the presence of an independent and competent lawyer, preferably of his own choice;
4. He must be informed that if he has no lawyer or cannot afford the services of a lawyer, one will be provided for him; and that a lawyer may also be engaged by any person in his behalf, or may be appointed by the court upon petition of the person arrested or one acting in his behalf;
5. ...

No court or legislature has as yet determined the exact wording of the caution to be presented to arrested persons. As such, the Philippine National Police has created their own version. According to the 2010 edition of the official PNP manual, "every police officer, either on board a mobile car, motorcycle or on foot patrol must always carry with him a police notebook, a pen and the Miranda Warning card. The notebook, which is approximately pocket-sized, will be used to inscribe important events that transpire during his tour of duty."

The version in use by the PNP reads:

English	Tagalog
Miranda warning You are arrested for the crime of _________ (or by virtue of Warrant of Arrest, showing him the warrant as it is practicable) You have the right to remain silent. Any statement you make may be used for or against you in a court of law . You have the right to have a competent and independent counsel preferably of your own choice, and if you cannot afford the services of a counsel, the government will provide you one. Do you understand these rights?	Ikaw ay inaaresto sa salang _________ (o sa pamamagitan ng kautusan ng pag-aresto, ipakita ito kung nararapat). Ikaw ay may karapatang manahimik o magsawalang kibo. Anuman ang iyong sabihin ay maaring gamitin pabor o laban sa iyo sa anumang hukuman. Ikaw ay mayroon ding karapatang kumuha ng tagapagtanggol na iyong pinili at kung wala kang kakayahan, ito ay ipagkakaloob sa iyo ng pamahalaan. Nauunawaan mo ba ito?
Anti-torture warning You have the right to demand physical examination by an independent and competent doctor of your choice. If you cannot afford the services of a doctor, the state shall provide one for you.	Ikaw ay may karapatang magpatingin sa isang mapagkakatiwalaang doktor na sarili mong pinili. Kung wala kang kakayahang kumuha ng iyong doktor, ikaw ay pagkakalooban ng libre ng estado o pamahalaan.

Various regional offices of the PNP use translations in other languages spoken in the Philippines depending on the jurisdiction of the office. In 2012, the International Committee of the Red Cross donated 15,000 cards to the PNP, and commissioned the translation of the warning into two more languages, Visaya and Cebuano, shown on the front of the card along with the Filipino version above.

Due to the increasing numbers of arrests of foreign nationals during President Rodrigo Duterte's Oplan Double Barrel, the Human Rights Affairs Office (PNP-HRAO) of the Philippine National Police in Camp Crame, Quezon City has further translated the Miranda warning into four foreign languages: Chinese, Japanese, Korean, and Taiwanese. Distribution of the translated warnings to law enforcement officers will occur via a publicly available mobile app, according to the officer-in-charge of PNP-HRAO, Sr. Supt. Dennis Siervo.

According to the website of the Philippine National Police Regional Office 13, at Camp Rafael C Rodriguez in Butuan, failure to recite either the Miranda or anti-torture warnings above can result in "dismissal of the case against the suspect and filing of administrative case for the arresting police [officer]."

=== Republic of Ireland ===
In the Republic of Ireland, the Supreme Court held that the right was not only a common law right but also a constitutional right which might however be validly limited by legislation (O'Leary v AG [1995] 1 IR 254).

In this jurisdiction, a number of statutory measures have re-interpreted the right to silence, such as the Criminal Justice Act 1984, the Criminal Justice (Drug Trafficking) Act, 1998, the Offences Against the State (Amendment) Act, 1998 and the Criminal Justice Act 2006, as amended. The general effect of some of these measures is to provide for adverse inferences to be drawn against a suspect who declines to answer certain questions or mention certain matters while being questioned in Garda custody.

=== Russian Federation ===
Clause 1 of the article 51 of the Russian Constitution grants everyone the right to not witness against either themselves or against their spouses and close relatives. As the decision whether or not an answer to a particular question would lead to (self)incrimination is left to the discretion of the person being questioned, this clause allows to remain silent at any time.

=== South Africa ===
The Constitution of South Africa requires that any arrested person be informed of their right to remain silent and the consequences of not remaining silent, their right to choose and consult with a legal practitioner, and their right to have a legal practitioner assigned to the detained person by the state and at state expense if substantial injustice would otherwise result. The South African Police Service rules prescribe that arrested people be given a Form 14A "Notice of Rights in Terms of the Constitution" which describes these and other rights of arrested people.

According to Section 35 of the Constitution of 1996 ("Arrested, detained and accused persons") states:

1. Everyone who is arrested for allegedly committing an offence has the right
  - to remain silent;
  - to be informed promptly
    - of the right to remain silent; and
    - of the consequences of not remaining silent;
  - not to be compelled to make any confession or admission that could be used in evidence against that person;

and later in the section:

- Every accused person has a right to a fair trial, which includes the right
  - . ...
  - not to be compelled to give self-incriminating evidence;

=== Spain ===
In Spain, according to the Ley de Enjuiciamiento Criminal (Penal procedure code) article 520.2, the suspect must be informed of the charges leading to his/her detention, as well as the reasons for being deprived of his/her freedom. Additionally, the individual must be advised of the following rights:

- Right to remain silent, to answer only questions of his/her choosing, or to express their desire to make a statement only in front of a judge.
- Right not to give evidence against him/herself, as well as not to confess his/her guilt.
- Right to legal representation by a private or state-funded attorney, which will assist him during hearings and procedures.
- Right to inform a member of his/her family or a person of his/her choosing regarding the detention as well as their location, at any moment of the proceedings. Foreigners have the right to contact their consulate in Spain.
- Right to request the services of an interpreter, at no cost, when the foreign national does not speak Spanish.
- Right to undergo a medical examination by the forensic doctor.

=== Switzerland ===
Article 158 of the unified Swiss code of criminal procedure, which entered into force in 2011, establishes that the results of an interrogation may not be used unless the accused has been informed that:

- he/she is the subject of a criminal investigation for some specific infractions,
- he/she has the right to remain silent and not to cooperate with police,
- he/she has the right to legal representation by a private or state-funded attorney, and
- he/she has the right to request the services of an interpreter.

The cantonal codes of procedure, which remain in force until 2011, generally contain similar provisions.

=== Thailand ===
Sections 83 and 84 of the Thai Code of Criminal Procedure, which have been amended by the Act Amending the Criminal Procedure Code (No. 22), BE 2547 (2004), require the police officers who conduct the arrests to inform the arrestees of their right against self-incrimination.

Paragraph two of section 83 reads:

In cases an arrest is conducted by an officer, the officer must inform the arrestee of the charge, produce to him a warrant of arrest, if any, and enlighten him that he has the right to remain silent, that anything he says can and will be used as evidence in a trial, and that he also has the right to meet and confer with a counsel or person to become his counsel. If the arrestee wishes to inform his relative or intimate of his arrest and the fulfillment of his wish would not be difficult and not be disruptive to his arrest or restraint or detrimental to any person, the officer shall allow the arrestee to so fulfill to the extent reasonable according to the circumstances. In this respect, the arresting officer shall also draw up a record of arrest.

While paragraph one of section 84 prescribes:

An officer or private citizen conducting an arrest must without delay bring the arrestee to the judicial police office under section 83. Upon arriving there, the arrestee must be delivered to an administrative or police officer thereof to further be dealt with as follows: (2) In cases the arrest is conducted by a private citizen, the administrative or police officer receiving the arrestee shall draw up a record of the name, occupation and address of the citizen, including the information and circumstances as to the arrest as well, and require the citizen to sign such record. The officer shall then inform the male arrestee of the charge and detailed grounds for his arrest, and enlighten him that he has the right to remain silent and anything he says can and will be used as evidence in a trial.

=== Turkey ===
The right to remain silent in Turkey has been fundamentally protected under Article 38 of Chapter 13 of the Constitution of Turkey:

No one shall be compelled to make a statement that would incriminate himself/herself or his/her legal next of kin, or to present such incriminating evidence.

This right has also been noted in the Law on Criminal Procedure.

=== Ukraine ===
Section 4 of Article 29 of Constitution of Ukraine reads:

Everyone arrested or detained shall be informed without delay of the reasons for his or her arrest or detention, apprised of his or her rights, and from the moment of detention shall be given the opportunity to personally defend himself or herself, or to have the legal assistance of a defender.

Article 63 of Constitution of Ukraine reads:

A person shall not bear responsibility for refusing to testify or to explain anything about himself or herself, members of his or her family or close relatives in the degree determined by law.

A suspect, an accused, or a defendant has the right to a defense.

A convicted person enjoys all human and citizens' rights, with the exception of restrictions determined by law and established by a court verdict.

The Criminal Process Code of Ukraine has some regulations on how the rights of suspects and accused. Section 2 of Article 21 reads:

Inquirer, investigator, prosecutor, judge, and court, before the first examination of the suspect, accused, and defendant, are required to advise them of the right to have a defense counsel and draw up an appropriate record thereon, as well as provide the suspect, accused, and defendant the possibility to defend themselves with legal remedies from the charge brought and ensure protection of their personal and property rights.

Article 43–1, Section 1 gives the following definition of "suspect":

The following person is considered to be a suspect:

1) a person apprehended on the suspicion of having committed a crime;

2) a person in whose respect a measure of restraint has been imposed before the decision to prosecute him/her has been made.

Consequently, the list of suspect's rights follows:

The suspect has the right to: know what he/she is suspected of; give testimonies or refuse testifying and answering questions; have a defence counsel and meet him/her before the first examination; produce evidence; submit motions and propose disqualifications; request that the court or prosecutor verify legality of the apprehension; submit complaints against actions and decisions of the officer who conducts operational-detective activities, inquirer, investigator, and prosecutor, and, with appropriate grounds present, have his/her security ensured. The fact that the suspect was advised of his/her rights is entered into the record of apprehension or decision to impose a measure of restraint.

Article 53 contains the following regulation:

Court, prosecutor, investigator and the inquirer are required to advise participants to the case of their rights and to ensure the possibility to enjoy such rights.

However, there are no clear regulations on how the rights should be announced. This is commonly made by reading them out when announcing the decision on instituting criminal proceedings or arrest and then requiring a suspect or arrestee to sign the list of these rights.

=== United Kingdom ===
The right to silence is different depending on which UK jurisdiction the suspect is questioned. In England and Wales it is possible for an adverse inference to be drawn from an accused person's silence during questioning. The same is true for Northern Ireland under the Criminal Evidence (Northern Ireland) Order 1988, but no adverse inference may be drawn in Scotland under Scots law.

==== England and Wales ====
The right to silence has a long history in England and Wales, first having been codified in the Judges' Rules in 1912. A defendant in a criminal trial has a choice whether or not to give evidence in the proceedings. Further, there is no general duty to assist the police with their inquiries.

At common law, and particularly following the passing of the Criminal Justice and Public Order Act 1994, adverse inferences may be drawn in certain circumstances where the accused:

- fails to mention any fact which he later relies upon and which in the circumstances at the time the accused could reasonably be expected to mention;
- fails to give evidence at trial or answer any question;
- fails to account on arrest for objects, substances or marks on his person, clothing or footwear, in his possession, or in the place where he is arrested; or
- fails to account on arrest for his presence at a place.

There may be no conviction based wholly on silence. Where inferences may be drawn from silence, the court must direct the jury as to the limits to the inferences which may properly be drawn from silence.

In respect of those questioned by the Serious Fraud Office, the right to silence has been reduced by virtue of Section 2 of the Criminal Justice Act 1987. The right has also been reduced for those accused of terrorist offences.

The UK has some of the strictest key disclosure laws of the western world. Under Section 49 and Section 53 of the Regulation of Investigatory Powers Act 2000 (RIPA), it is an offence to fail to disclose when requested the key to encrypted data (with a penalty of two years in prison, or five years with regards to child sex abuse cases). Schedule 7 of the Terrorism Act 2000 has been used to convict people who have refused to disclose their password to customs.

===== History =====
Warnings regarding the right against self-incrimination may have originated in England and Wales. In 1912, the judges of the King's Bench issued the Judges' Rules. These provided that, when a police member had admissible evidence to suspect a person of an offence and wished to question that suspect about an offence, the officer should first caution the person that he was entitled to remain silent. However, the warning about the possibility of anything the male suspect said being potentially used against him predates even that.

The pre-trial operation of the privilege against self-incrimination was further buttressed by the decision in Ibrahim v R [1914] AC 599 that an admission or confession made by the accused to the police would only be admissible in evidence if the prosecution could establish that it had been voluntary. An admission or confession is only voluntary if made in the exercise of a free choice about whether to speak or remain silent:

In R v Leckey (1943) CAR 128 the Court of Criminal Appeal said:

... an innocent person might well, either from excessive caution or for some other reason, decline to say anything when charged and cautioned, and if it were possible to hold that out to a jury as a ground on which they might find a man guilty, it is obvious that innocent persons might be in great peril.

Therefore, a caution of the form of:

You have the right to remain silent, but anything you do say will be taken down and may be used in evidence.

was used. Major reform to the questioning and treatment of suspected offenders occurred in 1984 when the Police and Criminal Evidence Act came into force. Under Code C the right to silence was amended by allowing adverse inferences to be drawn at a court hearing in cases where a suspect refuses to explain something, and then later produces an explanation (see right to silence in England and Wales). In other words, the jury is entitled to infer that the accused fabricated the explanation at a later date, as he refused to provide the explanation during police questioning. The jury is also free to make no such inference. The new caution is:

You do not have to say anything, but it may harm your defence if you do not mention, when questioned, something which you later rely on in court. Anything you do say may be given in evidence.

If questioning is forthcoming, "when questioned" may be replaced with "now". In cases in which the suspect has clearly nothing to gain by failing to remain silent:

Anything you do say may, and will, be given in evidence.

or:

You do not have to say anything unless you wish to do so, but I must warn you that if you fail to mention any fact which you rely on in your defence in court, your failure to take this opportunity to mention it may be treated in court as supporting any relevant evidence against you. If you do wish to say anything, what you say may be given in evidence.

or even (in circumstances where no adverse inference can be drawn from silence):

You do not have to say anything, but anything you do say may be given in evidence.

==== Northern Ireland ====
The Criminal Evidence (Northern Ireland) Order 1988 provided for adverse inferences being drawn for failure to mention something prior to being charged to an offence. The Criminal Procedure (Amendment) Rules 2009/2087 which came into effect on 5 October 2009, and replaced the Criminal Procedure Rules 2005, Pt 24 provides for post-charge questioning. This can be applied for failure to mention facts after a suspect has been charged with an offence.

The scope of emergency legislation in Northern Ireland includes limitations on the right to silence, extended police detention powers and limitations on a suspect's right to legal counsel at time of arrest which can all impact upon a suspect's right to a fair trial. In John Murray v United Kingdom, the ECHR declared that the fair trial guarantee encompassed the entire legal process from the moment of arrest through to conviction. The ECHR addressed this issue in a limited context in Murray v UK (1996); "To deny access to a lawyer for the first 48 hours of police questioning, in a situation where the rights of the defense may well be irretrievably prejudiced, is – whatever the justification for such denial – incompatible with the rights of the accused under Article 6."

==== Scotland ====
The right to silence in Scots law has been enshrined in statute by section 34 of the Criminal Justice (Scotland) Act 2016. Previously, the right to silence, as with much of Scots criminal law, was held under common law.

The common law caution given by police to inform a person of their right to silence in Scotland is:

"You are not obliged to say anything but anything you do say will be noted down and may be used in evidence. Do you understand?"

The only exception to this rule is that a person must state, upon being required to do so, their name, address, date of birth, place of birth (in such detail as a constable considers necessary or expedient for the purpose of establishing the person's identity), and nationality. The requirement to give personal details also exists in Scots law under section 13 of the Criminal Procedure (Scotland) Act 1995, which provides that a person suspected to have committed, or suspected of having been witness to, an offence must provide the aforementioned details to a constable upon being required to do so. Failure to provide said details under section 13 is a criminal offence.

No adverse inference can be drawn by an accused person's silence when they are interviewed under caution.

=== United States ===
The Fifth Amendment to the United States Constitution provides that no person shall be compelled in any criminal case to be a witness against themself. At trial, the prosecution can neither call the defendant as a witness, nor comment on the defendant's failure to testify. Whether to testify or not is exclusively the privilege of the defendant, although defendants were originally not allowed to testify on their own behalf at all. An 1864 appropriations act allowed defendants to do so while removing race restrictions, and the 1987 Supreme Court case Rock v. Arkansas established a constitutional "right to take the witness stand."

Outside the context of lawful detention or arrest, a person has no duty to answer any questions of the police. A witness or litigant may assert a Fifth Amendment right to silence in civil litigation, although there are potential consequences to litigants who exercise that right. Only if granted immunity by the state, in a formal proceeding, from having any testimony or evidence derived from the testimony used against them, can a person be compelled to answer over an assertion of this right. If police detain (or arrest) a person, they must advise them that they have a right to remain silent, and the right to an attorney, among other rights. (This is known as the Miranda warning.) If the detained person invokes these rights, all interrogation must cease, and ordinarily nothing said by the defendant in violation of this rule may be admitted against them at trial.

The form of the Miranda warning varies based on jurisdiction, but it usually follows this pattern:

You have the right to remain silent. Anything you say can be used against you in a court of law. You have the right to consult an attorney before speaking to the police and to have an attorney present during questioning now or in the future. If you cannot afford an attorney, one will be appointed for you before any questioning if you wish. If you decide to answer questions now without an attorney present, you have the right to stop answering at any time. Knowing and understanding your rights as I have explained them to you, are you willing to answer my questions without an attorney present?

On 17 June 2013, the US Supreme Court ruled in Salinas v. Texas that, prior to being arrested, an individual must specifically invoke the Fifth Amendment right to "remain silent", otherwise selective silence can be used against him or her in court.

==== Uniform Code of Military Justice ====
Members of the United States Armed Forces are covered by the Uniform Code of Military Justice (UCMJ). Under the UCMJ, sworn military personnel, whether of enlisted, warrant or commissioned rank, have a right to remain silent that was established 16 years before the Miranda v. Arizona ruling. There are significant protections against coercive self incrimination in Article 31, UCMJ, but it does differ somewhat from the Miranda warning, and in essence provides greater protections. This is one difference between civilian and military justice in the United States, and many other nations have similar corollary rules regarding military justice vs. civilian justice.

== See also ==
- International Covenant on Civil and Political Rights (Article 14)
- Miranda warning
- Presumption of innocence
- Privilege (evidence)
- Right to counsel
- Self-incrimination
- Burden of proof (law)
- Reverse onus
