= R v Sinclair =

- Supreme Court of Canada

Hearing: May 12, 2009 Judgment: October 8, 2010
- Full case name: Trent Terrence Sinclair v Her Majesty the Queen
- Citations: [2010] 2 S.C.R. 310
- Docket No.: 32537
- Prior history: Judgment for the Crown in the British Columbia Court of Appeal.
- Ruling: appeal dismissed

Holding
- (1) A detainee does not have the right to have counsel present during a police interrogation. (2) A detainee does not generally have the right to have additional phone calls with counsel, unless there has been a change of circumstances.

Court membership
- Chief Justice: Beverley McLachlin; Puisne Justices: Ian Binnie, Louis LeBel, Marie Deschamps, Morris Fish, Rosalie Abella, Louise Charron, Marshall Rothstein, Thomas Cromwell

Reasons given
- Majority: McLachlin C.J. and Charron J. (paras. 1-75), joined by Deschampes, Rothstein, and Cromwell JJ.
- Dissent: Binnie J. (paras. 76-122)
- Dissent: LeBel and Fish JJ. (paras. 123-227), joined by Abella J.

R v Sinclair 2010 SCC 35 is a leading case from the Supreme Court of Canada on a detainee's right to counsel under section 10(b) of the Canadian Charter of Rights and Freedoms.

Specifically, the case addresses two issues regarding the police's implementation duty under the right to counsel: 1) does a detainee have the right to have a lawyer present during police questioning, and 2) does a detainee have the right to make multiple phone calls to their lawyer. A majority of the Court answered the first question in the negative, and answered the second question in the negative, subject to a change of circumstances.

The parties to the case were the appellant, Sinclair, the respondent, the Attorney General of British Columbia, and the following interveners: the Attorney General of Ontario, the Director of Public Prosecutions of Canada, the Criminal Lawyers' Association of Ontario, the British Columbia Civil Liberties Association, and the Canadian Civil Liberties Association.

The case was part of a trilogy of cases released by the Supreme Court, along with R v Willier and R v McCrimmon.

== Background ==
=== Events following arrest ===
On December 14, 2002, Trent Sinclair was arrested by the Royal Canadian Mounted Police detachment in Vernon, British Columbia in relation to the murder of Gary Grice.

Upon his arrest and being advised of the reason for his arrest, Sinclair was given his rights to counsel. Sinclair indicated that he wanted to speak to a specific lawyer. The police placed a call to that lawyer and allowed Sinclair to speak to the lawyer over the phone in a private room. Three minutes later, Sinclair indicated that he had completed his phone call. When asked by the police if he was satisfied with the phone call, Sinclair replied "Yeah, he's taking my case."

Three hours later, the police called the lawyer to see if he was coming to the police station to meet Sinclair. The lawyer replied that he was not, as he did not have a retainer yet. However, he asked to speak to Sinclair again, and the two spoke privately over the phone for another three minutes. Sinclair again told the police he was satisfied with the phone call.

Later that day, Sinclair was questioned by the police for five hours. Prior to the start of the questioning, Sinclair confirmed that he exercised his right to counsel, and the police warned Sinclair that he did not have to say anything and that interview would be recorded and could be used in court. At the outset of the questioning, Sinclair said he would not answer the police officer's questions until his lawyer was present and could advise him. The police officer confirmed with Sinclair that he had the right not to speak. The police officer also advised Sinclair that his understanding of the law in Canada was that he had the right to speak to a lawyer, but not to have a lawyer present during questioning. Sinclair accepted the officer's statement, and the interview continued.

As the interview progressed, Sinclair repeated that he wanted his lawyer present. The officer repeated that Sinclair had the right not to speak, and that Sinclair's right to counsel was exercised by his phone calls. Sinclair again accepted the officer's statements, and the interview continued.

During the interview, the police officer revealed details of the crime that implicated Sinclair. Some of those details were false. Sinclair responded by saying he had nothing to say and would not be talking, and that he wanted to talk to his lawyer about what the officer was saying. The officer replied by again repeating that it was Sinclair's choice whether he wanted to speak or not. This happened four or five times during the interview.

At one point in the interview, Sinclair indicated that he was uncertain what he should say, and that he would like some time to speak with his lawyer.

The police officer's questioning continued. Sinclair eventually admitted to stabbing the victim multiple times and disposing of the body and evidence.

After the interview, Sinclair was placed in a cell with an undercover officer. Sinclair told the undercover officer: "They've got me, the body, the sheets, the blood, the fibres on the carpet, the witnesses. I'm going away for a long time but I feel relieved." Sinclair explained he would not be looking over his shoulder for the police.

Sinclair later went with the police to the scene of the crime and re-enacted what happened.

=== Trial ===
The trial took place at the Supreme Court of British Columbia. The trial judge found that the three statements (interview, cell, and re-enactment) were voluntary, and that Sinclair's right to counsel was satisfied when he spoke with his lawyer over the phone. The statements were admitted into evidence, and Sinclair was found guilty of manslaughter.

=== Appeal ===
The appeal was heard before the British Columbia Court of Appeal. The court was unanimous in holding up Sinclair's conviction.

Sinclair was later granted leave to appeal to the Supreme Court of Canada.

== Reasons of the court ==
The majority decision was co-written McLachlin C.J. and Charron J. Two separate dissenting decisions were also released: one was written by Binnie J. and the other was co-written by LeBel and Fish JJ.

=== Purpose of right to counsel ===
The majority found that the purpose of the right to speak with counsel is "to allow the detainee not only to be informed of his rights and obligations under the law but, equally if not more important, to obtain advice as to how to exercise those rights." In the context of a police interrogation, the purpose of the right is to support a detainee's right whether or not to cooperate with the police by giving the detainee access to legal advice.

In his dissenting decision, Justice Binnie found that the purpose of the right to counsel is to help a detainee understand his or her rights as well as how to exercise those rights in dealing with the authorities. Binnie pointed out that if the purpose of the right to counsel was just to echo what the police had already said, regardless of what may emerge during the course of the interrogation, then the role of counsel could be replaced with the following recorded message: You have reached counsel; keep your mouth shut; press one to repeat this message.

Justice Binnie found that between the majority's interpretation in this case, and the Court's decision in prior cases regarding police interrogations (i.e. R v Singh, 2007 SCC 48), the police have more power over a detainee than the Charter intended.

In their dissenting decision, Justices LeBel and Fish found that the purpose of the right to counsel was broader, and that it includes advising a detainee why and how their rights should be effectively exercised.

=== Right to have counsel present during interrogation ===
Given the purpose of the right to counsel, the majority found that the purpose can be exercised when a detainee is given access to speak to counsel when circumstances change. There is no need for counsel to be present during an interrogation for the right to counsel to be properly exercised (although nothing prevents counsel from being present if both sides agree).

Justice Binnie agreed with the majority that there was no right to have counsel present during a police interview.

Justices LeBel and Fish did not explicitly deal with this issue.

=== Right to reconsult with counsel ===
The majority found that given the purpose of the right to counsel, a detainee has the right to reconsult with counsel if there has been a change of circumstances such that the initial legal advice would no longer be adequate. The majority provided the following, non-exhaustive list of possible change of circumstances that would require further consultation with counsel:

- New, non-routine procedures, that the advising lawyer would not have expected at the time of the original consultation (i.e. a polygraph, a photo lineup, etc.).
- Change in jeopardy (i.e. new charges).
- Reason to believe the detainee did not understand his right to counsel.

The majority went on to find that the change in circumstances must be objectively observable, and cannot be claimed by a detainee after the fact. The majority also found that if the right to reconsult was triggered every time a detainee person requests to reconsult his lawyer, the police would be giving up control of the interrogation to the detainee.

In his dissenting decision, Binnie J. endorsed an intermediate position where a detainee makes a request to reconsult counsel when it is reasonable in the circumstances. Although Binnie J. did not define what is reasonable, he provided a non-exhaustive list of factors.

In their dissenting decision, LeBel and Fish JJ. found that a detainee had the right to reconsult with counsel at his or her request, and that police can continue the interrogation after the right has been properly exercised. The dissent also disagreed with Binnie J.'s decision, as the power to decide when a detainee should be allowed to speak to their counsel should not be left in the hands of the interrogator.

=== Application to the facts ===
The majority found that there had been no change in Sinclair's circumstances that would have justified the need for him to receive further advice from counsel. It appeared that Sinclair fully understood his right that it was his choice whether to talk or remain silent. Therefore, the majority dismissed the appeal.

Justice Binnie found that Sinclair's requests to speak to his lawyer again did not become reasonable until he had been interrogated for a number of hours and had been advised that there was "absolutely overwhelming" evidence against him. As a result, Sinclair's rights were breached. The admission to the undercover officer and the re-enactment were also tainted by the breach. Since there is a presumption against admission of unconstitutionally obtained statements, Binnie J. would have excluded the statements from evidence, and would have allowed the appeal and ordered a new trial.

Justices LeBel and Fish found that by not allowing Sinclair to speak to his lawyer again after multiple requests, his rights were breached, and the admission to the undercover officer and the re-enactment were tainted. Applying the test from R v Grant, they would have excluded the statements from evidence, allow the appeal, and order a new trial...

== See also ==
- Criminal law of Canada
- List of Supreme Court of Canada cases
- R v Oickle, [2000] 2 S.C.R. 3
