= Frank Gavan Duffy =

Australian judge

The Right Honourable Sir Frank Duffy KCMG PC KC
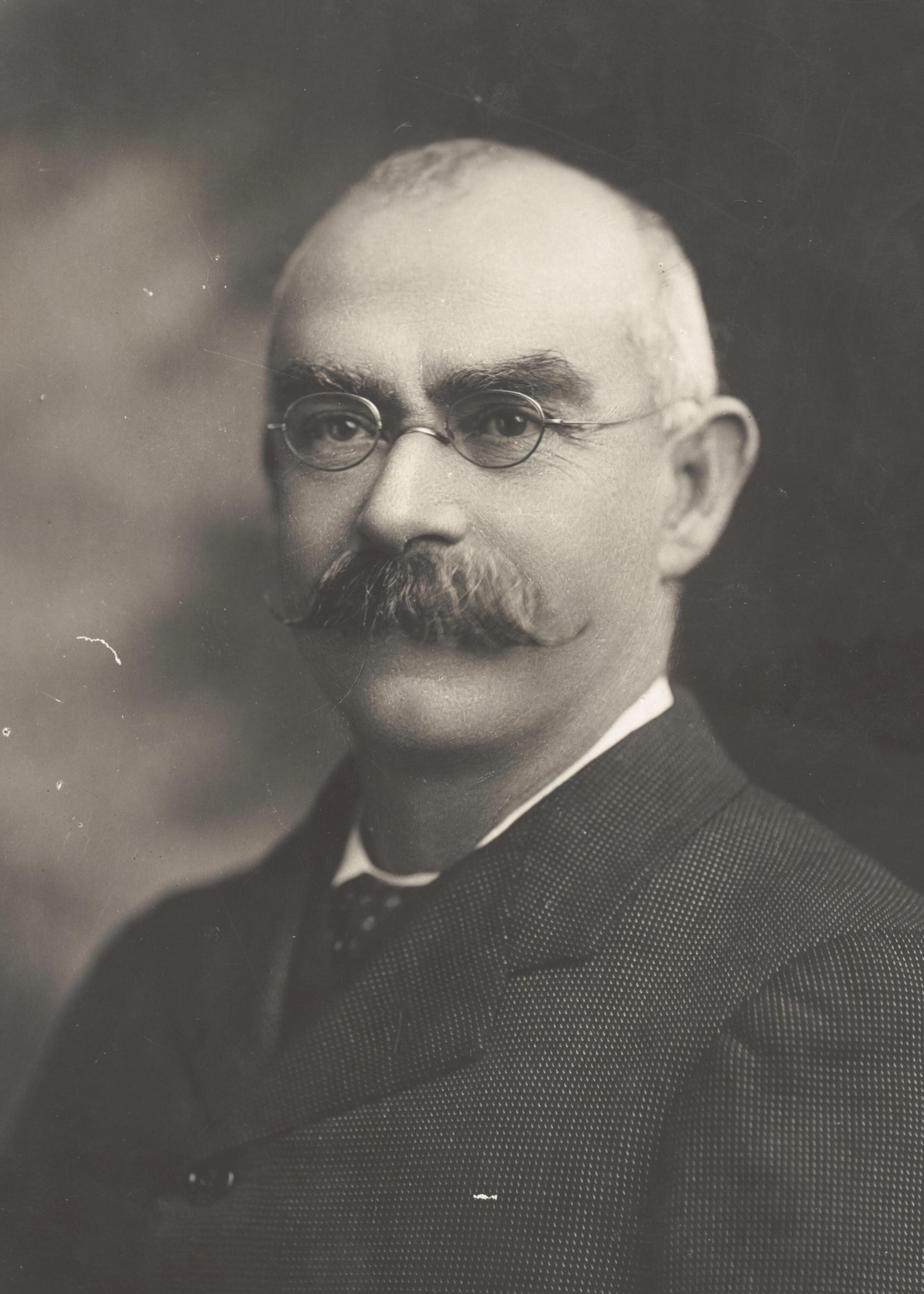

Chief Justice of Australia
- In office 22 January 1931 – 1 October 1935
- Nominated by: James Scullin
- Appointed by: Sir Isaac Isaacs
- Preceded by: Sir Isaac Isaacs
- Succeeded by: Sir John Latham

Justice of the High Court of Australia
- In office 1 February 1913 – 22 January 1931
- Nominated by: Andrew Fisher
- Appointed by: Lord Denman
- Preceded by: Richard O'Connor
- Succeeded by: John Latham

Personal details
- Born: 29 February 1852 Dublin, Ireland
- Died: 29 July 1936 (aged 84) Fitzroy, Victoria, Australia
- Relations: Sir Charles Gavan Duffy (father); Sir Charles Leonard Gavan Duffy (son); George Gavan Duffy (half-brother); Louise Gavan Duffy (half-sister)
- Education: University of Melbourne

Sir Frank Gavan Duffy (29 February 1852 – 29 July 1936) was an Australian judge who served as the fourth Chief Justice of Australia, in office from 1931 to 1935. His total service on the High Court of Australia was from 1913 to 1935. Prior to his judicial career, he was one of Victoria's most prominent barristers.

== Early life ==
Duffy was born in Dublin, Ireland, on 29 February 1852, the son of Sir Charles Gavan Duffy, who was later to become a member of the Victorian Legislative Assembly, and the eighth Premier of Victoria.

He travelled to Australia with his family in 1856, but later went to England to study at Stonyhurst College in Lancashire. In 1869, Duffy returned to Australia and attended the University of Melbourne, graduating in 1872 with a Bachelor of Arts.

At this time, he began to work in the public service, and started to study law.

== Legal career ==
In 1874, Duffy was called to the Victorian Bar, and began practising as a barrister in 1875. Over the next few years, Duffy contributed to the second edition of Casey's Justices Manual, published in 1879, and in the same year founded the Australian Law Times. He edited this publication until 1883. Over the next twenty years, Duffy published many more works on various pieces of legislation.

Duffy was caught up in the Australian banking crisis of 1893, but over time paid back his debts. He was appointed a Queen's Counsel in 1900, and between 1902 and 1910 he lectured on contract law at the University of Melbourne. He often appeared on behalf of the Commonwealth in constitutional cases in the High Court of Australia where his name is listed in the Commonwealth Law Reports as Duffy KC. In 1907, Duffy became the editor of the Victorian Law Reports. In 1908, with William Ah Ket, he successfully represented James Minahan before the High Court, in a landmark decision which recognised the principle of legality for the first time in Australian common law. By 1910, Duffy was widely regarded as the most prominent Victorian lawyer, and the unofficial leader of the Victorian Bar.

== Judicial career ==
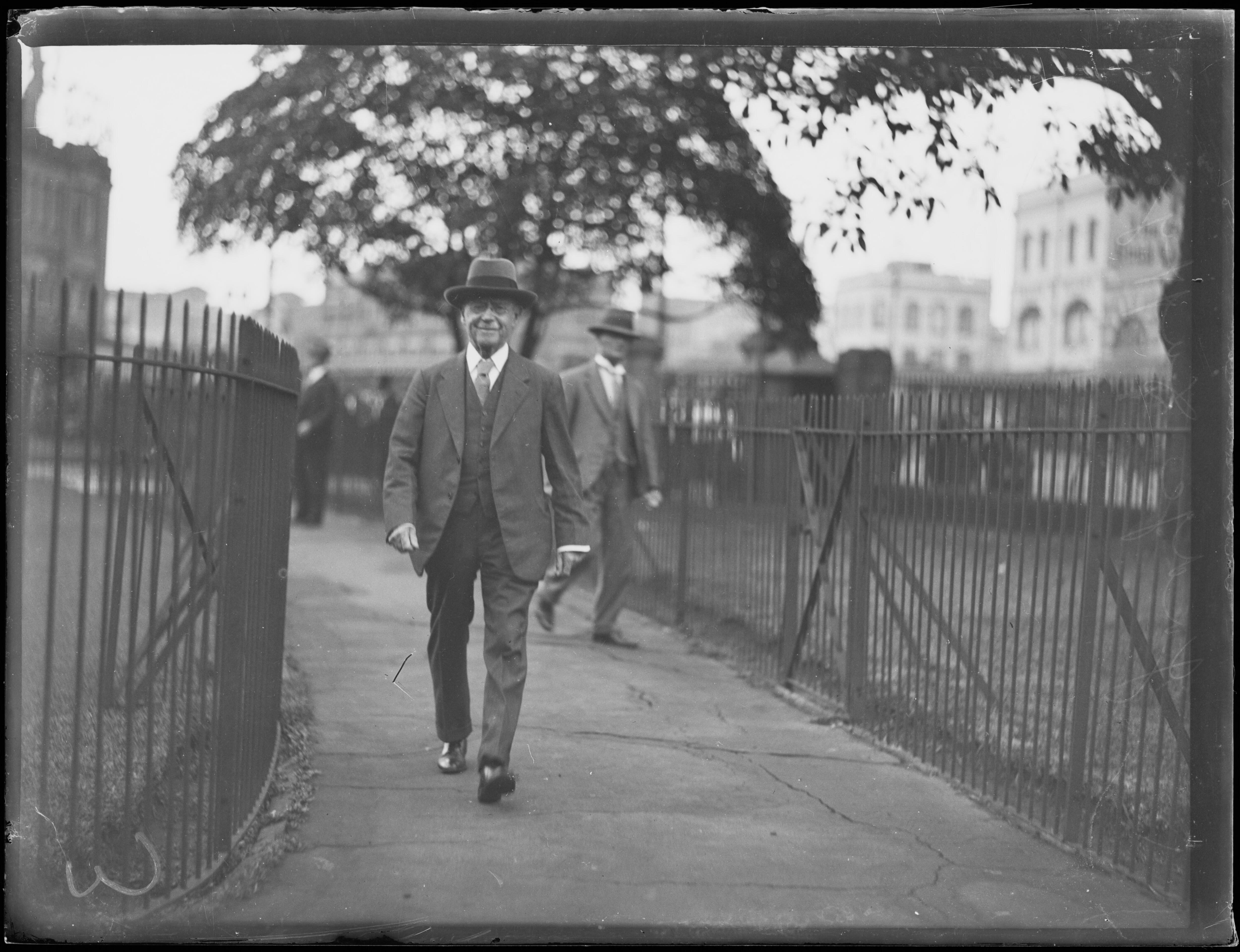
Duffy in 1932

Duffy was appointed to the bench of the High Court of Australia in 1913. Throughout his time on the bench he was referred to in the Commonwealth Law Reports as Gavan Duffy J. Seventeen years later, in 1931, when Sir Isaac Isaacs was made Governor-General, he took over as Chief Justice of the High Court. Gavan Duffy was considered largely ineffectual as a judge, let alone as Chief Justice.

As Chief Justice on the infrequent occasions he penned his own judgments they were extremely brief and he sat on less than half of the full court cases. He agreed to retire from the bench in 1935, at age eighty-three, to make way for John Latham.

He had planned to deliver a series of lectures on Australian constitutional law at Harvard University's tercentenary early in 1936, but was too ill. He died after a brief illness on 29 July 1936, at Mount St Evin's Private Hospital, Fitzroy. He was survived by his wife and three sons, among them Charles Leonard Gavan Duffy, later a Justice of the Supreme Court of Victoria.

== Honours ==
Duffy was created a Knight Commander of the Order of St Michael and St George (KCMG) in 1929. Duffy had been made a member of the Imperial Privy Council in 1932.

== Family ==
Duffy's son Sir Charles Leonard Gavan Duffy served on the Supreme Court of Victoria. His half-brother, George Gavan Duffy, was an Irish politician and later (from 1936) a judge of the Irish High Court, serving as its President from 1946 until his death in 1951. His half-sister Louise Gavan Duffy was raised in France by his sisters and was an Irish nationalist involved in the 1916 Easter Rising as well as an Irish language enthusiast who founded an Irish language school for girls in Dublin.

Legal offices
Preceded by Sir Isaac Isaacs	Chief Justice of Australia; 1931–1935	Succeeded by Sir John Latham
