= S v Nkondo =

South African legal case

In S v Nkondo (2000), an important case in South African criminal procedure, Nkondo had appeared before a regional court and was convicted of rape and robbery. The case was then sent to the high court for sentencing where it was held that Nkondo had not been thoroughly apprised of his right to legal representation and had elected to appear in person.

The court held that when courts explain the right to legal representation to accused persons and an accused person facing a serious charge elects to remain unrepresented, the magistrate should ask the accused why he or she wanted to appear in person and if it appeared that the accused was under some or other misunderstanding that has to be put right.

The High Court set aside the convictions of robbery and rape and remitted the matter to the regional court in order that the matter could be re-tried.
