= Star Chamber =

15th- to 17th-century English court

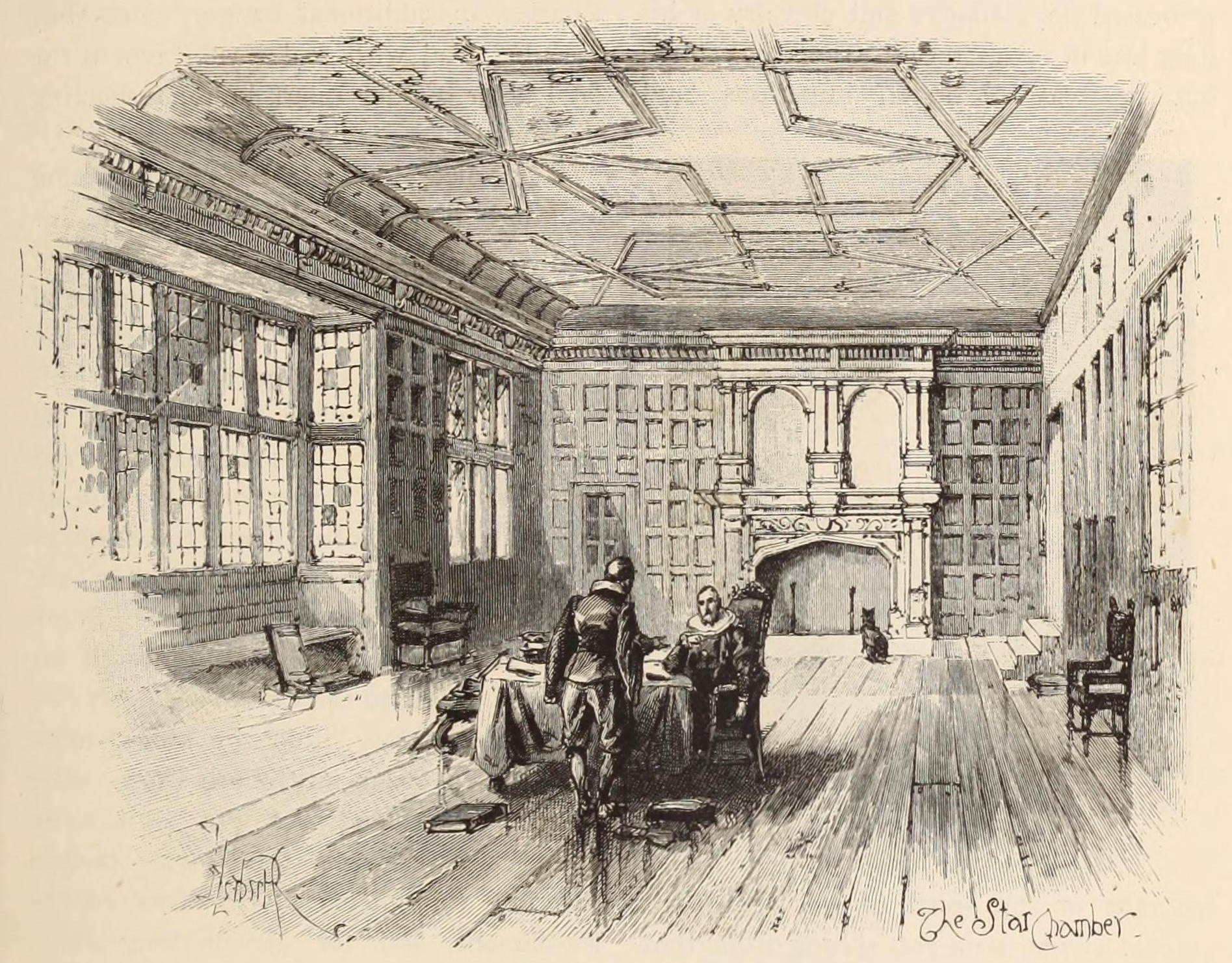
The Star Chamber (late 19th-century engraving)

The court of Star Chamber (Latin: Camera stellata) was an English court that sat at the royal Palace of Westminster, from the late 15th century to the mid-17th century (c. 1641), and was composed of privy counsellors and common-law judges, to supplement the judicial activities of the common-law and equity courts in civil and criminal matters.

It was originally established to ensure the fair enforcement of laws against socially and politically prominent people sufficiently powerful that ordinary courts might hesitate to convict them of their crimes. It was mainly a court of appeal and could impose any penalty, except the death penalty, in its own right. At various times it had sub-courts for particular areas, notably for appeals of "poor man's causes".

The Chamber building itself was also sometimes used for other councils, courts, and committee meetings, which may cause confusion as to the role of the court of Star Chamber.

In modern times, legal or administrative bodies with strict, arbitrary rulings, no due process rights to those accused, and secretive proceedings are sometimes metaphorically called "star chambers". (Note: For example, in Dáil Éireann, the lower house of the parliament of Ireland: "The Ceann Comhairle intervened and said the Dáil could not be used as a "star chamber" warning that people's reputations were involved and if the deputy had information he should go to the gardaí.") However, the idea that the Star Chamber acted arbitrarily is considered to be a myth by at least one academic.

== Origin of the name ==
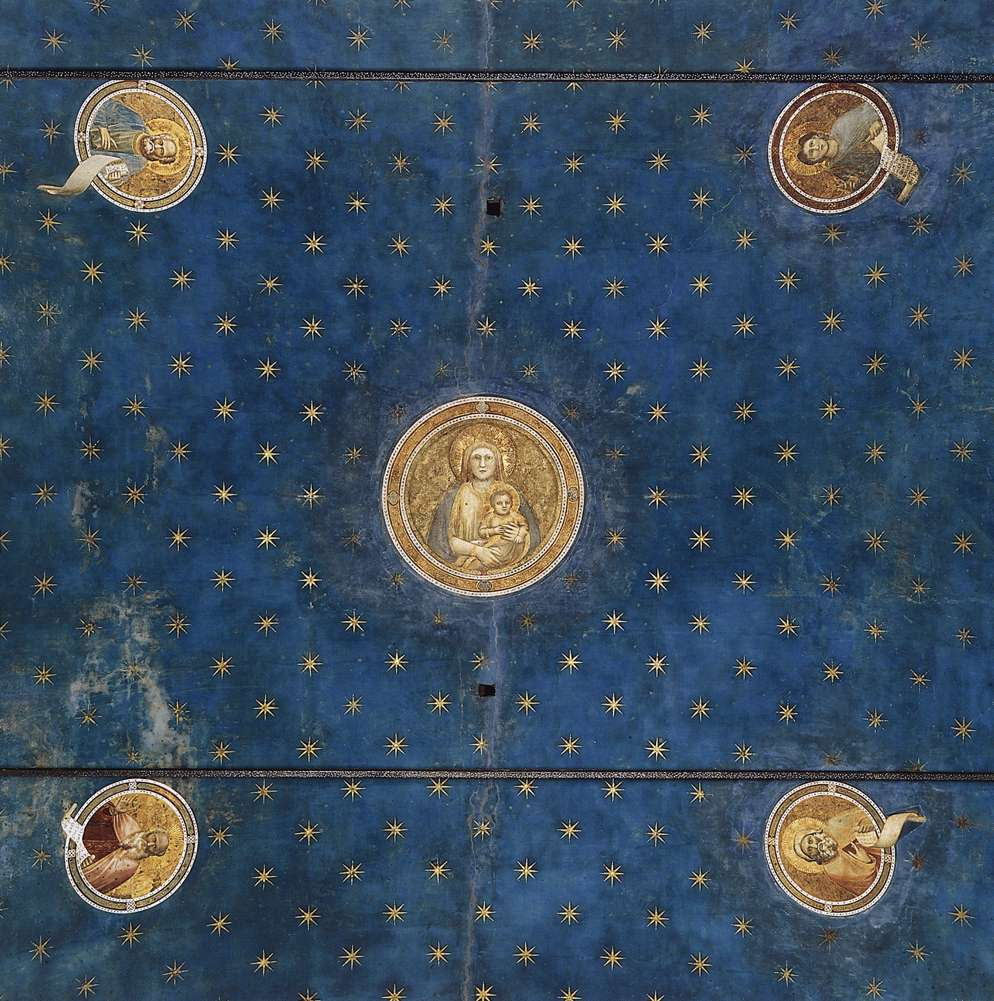
Starry vault of the Scrovegni Chapel in Padua, Italy, frescoed by Giotto, a common ceiling motif of the period throughout Europe

The first reference to the "star chamber" (Note: Or, rather, the first reference in the OED. Blackstone mentions a reference in a document of 41 Edw. III – 1367 – but does not quote it) is in 1398, as the Sterred chambre; the more common form of the name appears in 1422 as le Sterne-chamere. Both forms recur throughout the fifteenth century, with Sterred Chambre last attested as appearing in the Supremacy of the Crown Act 1534 (establishing the English monarch as head of the Church in England). It was housed in a three-storied building with at least three rooms and kitchen. The origin of the name has usually been explained as first recorded by John Stow, writing in his Survey of London (1598), who noted "this place is called the Star Chamber, at the first all the roofe thereof was decked with images of starres gilted". Gold stars on a blue background were a common medieval decoration for ceilings in richly decorated rooms: the Star Chamber ceiling itself is still to be seen at Leasowe Castle, Wirral, and similar examples are in the Scrovegni Chapel in Padua and elsewhere.

Alternatively, William Blackstone, a notable English jurist writing in 1769, speculated that the name had been derived from the legal word "starr" meaning the contract or obligation to a Jew (from the Hebrew שטר (shtar) meaning "document"). This term was in use until 1290, when Edward I had all Jews expelled from England. Blackstone thought the "Starr Chamber" might originally have been used for the deposition and storage of such contracts. However, the Oxford English Dictionary gives this etymology "no claim to consideration."

Other etymological speculations mentioned by Blackstone include the derivation from Old English steoran (steer) meaning "to govern"; as a court used to punish cozenage (in Latin: crimen stellionatus); or that the chamber was full of windows.

== History ==
=== Plantagenets and Tudors ===
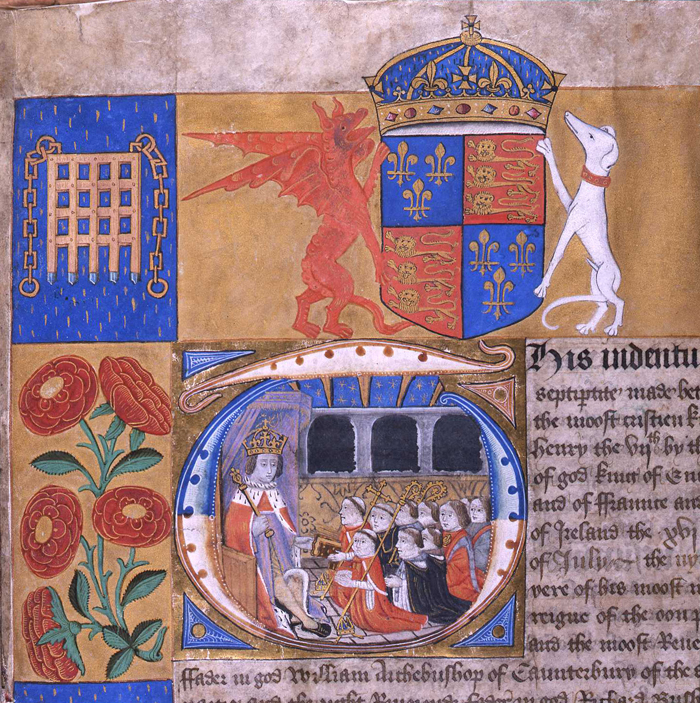
A document of 1504 showing King Henry VII sitting in the Star Chamber and receiving William Warham, Archbishop of Canterbury, Richard Foxe, Bishop of Winchester, and clerics associated with Westminster Abbey and St Paul's Cathedral, as well as the Mayor of London

Star Chamber Act 1487
- Act of Parliament
- Parliament of England
- Long title: An Acte geving the Court of Starchamber Authority to punnyshe dyvers Mydemeanors.
- Citation: 3 Hen. 7. c. 1
- Territorial extent: England and Wales; Ireland

Dates
- Royal assent: 9 November 1487 (Note: Start of session.)
- Commencement: 9 November 1487
- Repealed: England and Wales: 28 July 1863; Ireland: 10 August 1872
Other legislation
Amended by	Continuance of Laws, etc. Act 1627
Repealed by	England and Wales: Statute Law Revision Act 1863; Ireland: Statute Law (Ireland) Revision Act 1872

Status: Repealed

Text of statute as originally enacted

The Court evolved from meetings of the King's Council, with its roots going back to the medieval period. The so-called Star Chamber Act 1487 (3 Hen. 7. c. 1) of King Henry VII's second Parliament (1487) did not actually empower the Star Chamber, but rather created a separate tribunal distinct from the King's general Council.

Initially well-regarded because of its speed and flexibility, the Star Chamber was regarded as one of the most just and efficient courts of the Tudor era. Sir Edward Coke described the Star Chamber as "The most honourable court (Our Parliament excepted) that is in the Christian world. Both in respect of the judges in the court and its honourable proceeding."

The Star Chamber was made up of Privy Counsellors, as well as common-law judges, and it supplemented the activities of the common-law and equity courts in both civil and criminal matters. In a sense, the court was a court of appeal, a supervisory body, overseeing the operation of the lower courts, although it could hear cases by direct appeal as well. The court was set up to ensure the fair enforcement of laws against the English upper class, those so powerful that ordinary courts could never convict them of their crimes. Despite its subsequent reputation, it followed elaborate procedures and innovated in allowing defendants the right to counsel and to call witnesses.

Another function of the Court of Star Chamber was to act like a court of equity, which could impose punishment for actions that were deemed to be morally reprehensible, but were not in violation of the letter of the law. This gave the Star Chamber great flexibility, as it could punish defendants for any action that the court felt should be unlawful, even though it was technically lawful.

However, this meant that the justice meted out by the Star Chamber could be very arbitrary and subjective, and it enabled the court to be used later on in its history as an instrument of oppression rather than for the purpose of justice for which it was intended. Many crimes that are now commonly prosecuted, such as attempt, conspiracy, criminal libel, and perjury, were originally developed by the Court of Star Chamber, along with its more common role of dealing with misdemeanours, and, later, riots and sedition. Capital felonies and capital treason were not in its jurisdiction, it was not authorised to torture, and it could not impose the death sentence.

The cases decided in those sessions enabled both the very powerful and those without power to seek redress. Thus, King Henry VII used the power of the Star Chamber to break the power of the landed gentry, which had been such a cause of problems in the Wars of the Roses. Yet, when local courts were often clogged or mismanaged, the Court of Star Chamber also became a means of appeal for the common people against the excesses of the nobility.

In the time of Henry VII, the privy counsellors not attending the King at the time might sit in the star chamber.

In the reign of King Henry VIII, the court was under the successive leaderships of Cardinal Wolsey (the Archbishop of York and Lord Chancellor), perhaps the King himself and Thomas Cranmer (the Archbishop of Canterbury). From this time forward, the Court of Star Chamber became a political weapon for bringing actions against those who opposed the policies of King Henry VIII, his ministers and his parliament.

Although it was initially a court of appeal, King Henry, Wolsey and Cranmer encouraged plaintiffs to bring their cases directly to the Star Chamber, bypassing the lower courts entirely.

The Court was used extensively to control Wales, after the Laws in Wales Acts (sometimes referred to as the "Acts of Union"). The Tudor-era gentry in Wales turned to the Chamber to evict Welsh landowners, to protect themselves, and in general, to protect the advantages given to them by the Laws in Wales Acts.

One of the weapons of the Star Chamber was the ex officio oath where, because of their positions, individuals were forced to swear to answer truthfully all questions that might be asked. Faced with hostile questioning, this then gave them the "cruel trilemma" of having to incriminate themselves, face charges of perjury if they gave unsatisfactory answers to their accusers, or be held in contempt of court if they gave no answer.

=== Stuarts ===
The power of the Court of Star Chamber grew considerably under the House of Stuart, and by the time of King Charles I, it had become synonymous with misuse and abuse of power by the King and his circle. King James I and his son Charles used the court to examine cases of sedition, which meant that the court could be used to suppress opposition to royal policies. It came to be used to try nobles too powerful to be brought to trial in the lower courts.

King Charles I used the Court of Star Chamber as a Parliamentary substitute during the eleven years of Personal Rule, when he ruled without a Parliament. King Charles made extensive use of the Court of Star Chamber to prosecute dissenters, including the Puritans who fled to New England. This was one of the causes of the English Civil War.

On 17 October 1632, the Court of Star Chamber banned all "news books" because of complaints from Spanish and Austrian diplomats that coverage of the Thirty Years' War in England was unfair. As a result, newsbooks pertaining to this matter were often printed in Amsterdam and then smuggled into the country, until control of the press collapsed with the developing ideological conflict of 1640–41.

The Star Chamber became notorious for judgments favourable to the king, for example when Archbishop Laud had William Prynne branded on both cheeks through its agency in 1637 for seditious libel.

In 1571, Elizabeth I set up an equivalent Court in Ireland, the Court of Castle Chamber, to deal with cases of riot and offences against public order. Although it was initially popular with private litigants, under the Stuarts it developed the same reputation for harsh and arbitrary proceedings as its parent court, and during the political confusion of the 1640s, it disappeared.

In the early 1900s, Edgar Lee Masters commented:

In the Star Chamber the council could inflict any punishment short of death, and frequently sentenced objects of its wrath to the pillory, to whipping and to the cutting off of ears. ... With each embarrassment to arbitrary power the Star Chamber became emboldened to undertake further usurpation. ... The Star Chamber finally summoned juries before it for verdicts disagreeable to the government, and fined and imprisoned them. It spread terrorism among those who were called to do constitutional acts. It imposed ruinous fines. It became the chief defence of Charles against assaults upon those usurpations which cost him his life.

=== Abolition and aftermath ===
In 1641, the Long Parliament, led by John Pym and inflamed by the severe treatment of John Lilburne, as well as that of other religious dissenters such as William Prynne, Alexander Leighton, John Bastwick and Henry Burton, abolished the Star Chamber with the Habeas Corpus Act 1640.

The gruesome punishments that the Star Chamber had imposed were not forgotten, and were revived by King James II, prompting an article in the Bill of Rights of 1688 "That excessive Baile ought not to be required nor excessive Fines imposed nor cruell and unusuall Punishments inflicted".

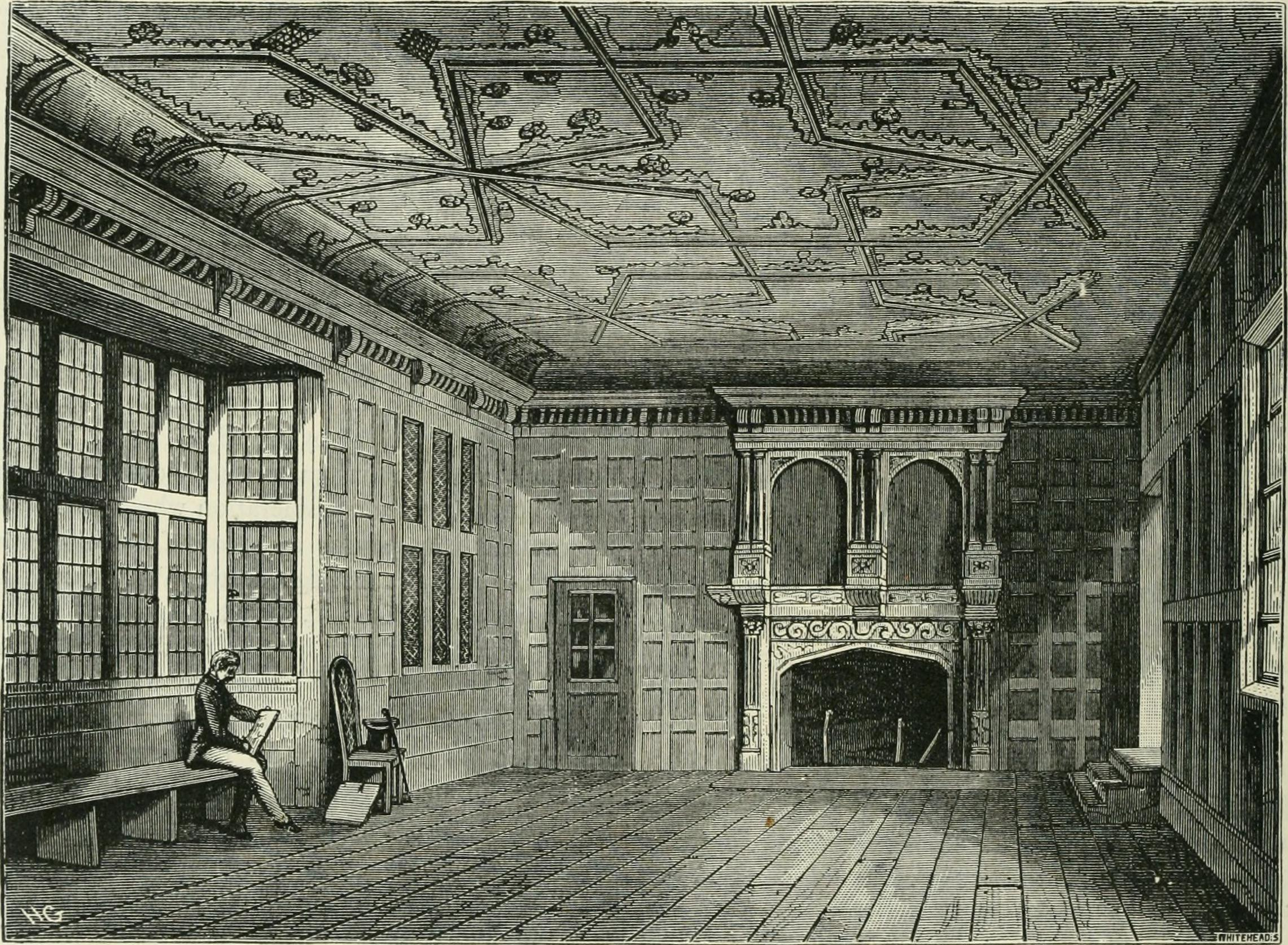
Engraving of the Star Chamber, published in "Old and new London" in 1873, taken from a drawing made in 1836

The Chamber itself stood until its demolition in 1806 (or 1834 or early in 1836), when its materials were salvaged. The door was reused in the nearby Westminster School until it was destroyed in the Blitz, and the historic Star Chamber ceiling, with its bright gold stars, was brought to Leasowe Castle on the Wirral Peninsula in Cheshire from the Court of Westminster, along with four tapestries depicting the four seasons.

== Recent history ==
In the late 20th century, the expression was revived in reference to ways of resolving internal high-level questions within the government, usually relating to budget appropriations. The press and some civil servants under the premiership of Margaret Thatcher (1979–1990) revived the term for private ministerial meetings at which disputes between the Treasury and high-spending departments were resolved. Neil Kinnock made reference to this style of Thatcher's government during his first outing at Prime Minister's Questions in 1983.

In 2010, the press employed the term for a committee established by the Cameron ministry to plan spending cuts to reduce public debt.

In March 2019, the European Research Group formed its own "Star Chamber" to pass judgement on Theresa May's then proposed Brexit deal, recommending that MPs should not back it. On 29 December 2020, the ERG's Star Chamber gave a similar verdict on Boris Johnson's recently agreed EU–UK Trade and Cooperation Agreement, but on this occasion recommended that their members vote for it because the deal was "consistent with the restoration of UK sovereignty". In December 2023 the ERG's Star Chamber rejected Rishi Sunak's proposed legislation to allow the Rwanda plan to go ahead.

== Influence on the US Constitution ==
The historical abuses of the Star Chamber are considered to be some of the reasons, along with English common law precedent, behind the protections against compelled self-incrimination embodied in the Fifth Amendment to the United States Constitution. The meaning of "compelled testimony" under the Fifth Amendment – i.e., the conditions under which a defendant is allowed to "plead the Fifth" to avoid self-incrimination – is thus often interpreted via reference to the inquisitorial methods of the Star Chamber.

As the US Supreme Court described it, "the Star Chamber has, for centuries, symbolised disregard of basic individual rights. The Star Chamber not merely allowed, but required, defendants to have counsel. The defendant's answer to an indictment was not accepted unless it was signed by counsel. When counsel refused to sign the answer, for whatever reason, the defendant was considered to have confessed."

In addition, the "excessive bail" article of the Bill of Rights 1689 was reproduced near-verbatim as the Eighth Amendment to the United States Constitution, which forms part of the US' own Bill of Rights.
