= Principle of Legality (Australia) =

Legal doctrine in Australian public law

The Principle of Legality is an important legal doctrine in Australian public law.

It is an interpretive presumption by the judiciary that Australia's various parliaments do not intend to curtail or abrogate fundamental rights and freedoms when enacting legislation. Due to this, parliaments are effectively required to enact legislation using express and unambiguous language if they wish to enact legislation negatively affecting any rights, liberties, or freedoms that the courts regard as being fundamental.

In recent decades the rule has grown in importance to Australian legal practice. It has been said that the doctrine as it is understood and articulated in its modern form 'has transformed a loose collection of rebuttable interpretive presumptions into a quasi-constitutional common law bill of rights'.

Other jurisdictions, including the UK and New Zealand, also apply the principle of legality doctrine; albeit with its application and reasoning differing according to their respective jurisprudence. The United States has a similar doctrine named the Clear statement rule.

== Background ==
The doctrine owes its origins in part to the common law tradition that Australia inherited from the United Kingdom. Over centuries, jurisprudence emerged as a means to reconcile the principles of parliamentary sovereignty, and those of established common law rights. Decisions such as Entick v Carrington established a tradition whereby rights (usually relating to property) would be protected from interference by the executive except as according to law.

Throughout the 20th century and beyond, the Australian High Court articulated these principles when interpreting statutes, including notably in the decisions Coco v The Queen, and Electrolux v AWU. In Coco, the majority stated:

The insistence on express authorization of an abrogation or curtailment of a fundamental right, freedom or immunity must be understood as a requirement for some manifestation or indication that the legislature has not only directed its attention to the question of the abrogation or curtailment of such basic rights, freedoms or immunities but has also determined upon abrogation or curtailment of them.

The courts should not impute to the legislature an intention to interfere with fundamental rights. Such an intention must be clearly manifested by unmistakable and unambiguous language. General words will rarely be sufficient for that purpose if they do not specifically deal with the question because, in the context in which they appear, they will often be ambiguous on the aspect of interference with fundamental rights

_{- Mason CJ, Brennan, Gaudron and McHugh JJ, at paragraph 10}

Chief Justice Gleeson's statement of the doctrine in Electrolux has been repeatedly endorsed by the courts. He said:

'(the principle is) not merely a common sense guide to what a Parliament in a liberal democracy is likely to have intended; it is a working hypothesis, the existence of which is known both to Parliament and the courts, upon which statutory language will be interpreted. The hypothesis is an aspect of the rule of law'

Academics have described the rule as having 'hardened into a strong clear statement rule that is applied when legislation engages common law rights and freedoms'. This may be contrasted with its past articulations, like that found in Potter v Minahan (1908), which instead tended to rely on judicial incredulousness at parliament's intentions; as the normative justification for reading down statutes. The shift in justification for the rule 'over the course of the 20th century' has been noted by legal commentators.

== Application ==
When interpreting legislation that appears to infringe upon fundamental rights or liberties, Australian courts rely on the principle of legality to guide their interpretation. It operates as a presumption that Parliament did not intend to restrict or abrogate these rights unless there is clear and unambiguous evidence to the contrary. Courts will construe ambiguous provisions narrowly if that interpretation is better aligned with the fundamental rights.

The established fundamental rights relevant to the principle of legality include:

- Freedom of speech
- Right to silence
- Privilege against self-incrimination (aka. the 'companion rule') (Note: The 'companion rule' is that an accused person cannot be required to testify to the commission of the offence charged; so called because it is a necessary logical companion to the criminal law's fundamental rule that the Crown must bear the onus of proof in a prosecution)
- Right to access the courts
- Right to legal representation
- Right to procedural fairness
- Freedom from arbitrary detention

The principle of legality is not absolute. Through express and unambiguous language, Australia's parliaments are able to articulate and give effect to an intention to abrogate fundamental rights. This occurs frequently within modern legislative practice, especially in statutes that contain contentious powers such as the powers to deport and detain refugees under the Migration Act 1958, or the numerous acts granting powers to police agencies. Often, such acts contain provisions directed at the courts spelling out parliamentary intention, if parliament anticipates the power may be legally challenged.

== Significance ==
The principle of legality plays an important role in providing a balance between parliamentary sovereignty and the protection of individual rights. It ensures that the government is held accountable for its actions and promotes transparency, fairness, and adherence to the rule of law. By encouraging a rights-conscious approach to legislative interpretation, the principle of legality contributes to the protection and promotion of human rights in Australia.

As noted by academics however, the doctrine is 'not without controversy or issue'. Critics have argued that the rule is only able to operate with political legitimacy if the parliament has prior knowledge of the rights the rule operates to protect. In circumstances where the existence, nature, or scope of a common law right is legally controversial; courts are effectively required to determine the rights at the point of resolving a dispute. It has been pointed out that in such cases, the rule operates to enforce and prioritise legal norms as preferred by the judiciary, over those of the parliament. This, it has been described, 'amounts to the illegitimate judicial remaking of prior legislative decisions on rights', undercutting justifications for the doctrine.

== Notable cases ==
The doctrine has played a role in numerous High Court decisions in recent years. There are many notable cases that either (1) demonstrate the application of the principle in practice, or (2) provide detail on the nature of the fundamental rights being protected. Among them are:

Coco v The Queen - in which legislation allowing the use of listening devices by law enforcement was considered. It was held that clear and unambiguous language was required to authorise such an intrusion on individual privacy.

Plaintiff S157/2002 v Cth - in which the doctrine was applied to read down a privative clause as it appeared in the Migration Act. The court reviewed provisions purporting to exclude the jurisdiction of courts to review administrative decisions with reference to the doctrine.

Lee v NSW Crime Commission - in which the court found (4:3) against Lee's appeal seeking review of a provision within the Criminal Assets Recovery Act 1990 (NSW). The provision sought to override the companion rule. (Note: The 'companion rule' is that an accused person cannot be required to testify to the commission of the offence charged; so called because it is a necessary logical companion to the criminal law's fundamental rule that the Crown must bear the onus of proof in a prosecution) Dr Anna Dziedzic summarised the case, saying:

'the majority considered that where the legislative purpose is sufficiently clear, and restricting a right or departing from a general principle of law is integral to achieving that purpose, the principle of legality will have no work to do. Subject to constitutional limits, the parliament has the power to make laws that abrogate rights and modify fundamental principles of the common law.' ...

'the judges in the minority criticised this approach on the basis that it assumed the answer to the central question. For the minority, the point of the principle of legality is that any restriction of a right or departure from the general system of law must be clearly dictated by express words or necessary implication and cannot be assumed from the general purpose and language of the Act'

Momcilovic v The Queen - in which the court dealt with, among other things, the interaction between the principle of legality and s32(1) of the Charter of Human Rights and Responsibilities Act 2006 (Vic); a legislative section that on its face imposes a similar interpretive process to the principle of legality.

== See also ==
- Clear statement rule - An equivalent legal doctrine in the USA
- Victorian Charter of Human Rights and Responsibilities
- Principle of legality in criminal law
