= Charles Leonard Gavan Duffy =

Australian soldier and judge

Sir Charles Gavan Duffy

Judge of the Supreme Court of Victoria
- In office 20 May 1933 – 12 August 1961

Personal details
- Born: Charles Leonard Gavan Duffy; 15 June 1882 Caulfield, Victoria, Australia
- Died: 12 August 1961 (aged 79) East Melbourne, Victoria, Australia
- Spouse: Mary Back (m. 1919; died 1959)
- Relations: Sir Frank Gavan Duffy (father); Sir Charles Gavan Duffy (grandfather)
- Education: University of Melbourne

Sir Charles Leonard Gavan Duffy (15 June 1882 – 12 August 1961) was an Australian soldier and judge. He served as a judge of the Supreme Court of Victoria from 1933 until his death in 1961. He was the son of Chief Justice of Australia Frank Gavan Duffy.

== Early life ==
Duffy was born on 15 June 1882 in Caulfield, Victoria. He was the oldest son of Ellen Mary (née Torr) and Frank Gavan Duffy. His father, the son of Victorian premier Charles Gavan Duffy, served as Chief Justice of Australia from 1931 to 1935. Duffy was educated at St Ignatius' College, Sydney, and Xavier College, Melbourne. He subsequently entered Trinity College in 1899, while studying law at the University of Melbourne.

== Career ==
Duffy served his articles of clerkship in Wangaratta and was admitted to the Victorian Bar in 1908, joining the chambers of his cousin's husband Hayden Starke.

=== Military service ===
Prior to World War I, Duffy held a commission as a second lieutenant in the Australian Field Artillery from 1908 to 1910. He enlisted in the Australian Imperial Force in April 1915, serving on the Gallipoli Campaign and in France on the Western Front. He was promoted captain in January 1917 and commanded the 4th Field Battery as a temporary major from August 1917, later promoted to substantive major. Duffy returned to Australia in August 1919.

=== Judiciary ===
Duffy was appointed to the Supreme Court of Victoria on 20 May 1933, following the death of Leo Cussen. According to the Australian Dictionary of Biography, he "proved a competent judge, gifted with keen memory and complete independence of mind and conducting his court admirably". In 1947, federal MP Max Falstein alleged that Robert Menzies, then serving as Attorney-General of Victoria, had appointed Duffy to the court as part of an attempt to persuade his father to resign from the High Court. Menzies described this as a "filthy and untrue statement". Duffy was knighted in 1952.

Duffy was involved in several notable cases on the court. In 1937 he upheld the will of former federal government minister Jens Jensen, which left his entire estate to his mistress. In 1950 he imposed the death sentence on Norman Andrews, Robert Clayton, and Jean Lee for the murder of a 73-year-old bookmaker. Lee became the last woman to be legally executed in Australia. In 1952, Duffy was appointed as one of three royal commissioners into allegations of bribery made to state MPs, along with the chief justice Edmund Herring and judicial colleague Russell Martin.

== Personal life ==
Duffy married Mary Marjorie Alexa Back in 1919; the couple had twin sons who died at birth. In 1944 he was elected president of the Melbourne Club. He was widowed in 1959 and died in East Melbourne on 12 August 1961. He was interred at Boroondara General Cemetery.

== See also ==
- List of judges of the Supreme Court of Victoria
