= Ehrlich v CEO, Legal Aid Board =

South African legal case

In Ehrlich v CEO, Legal Aid Board (2005), an important case in South African criminal procedure, the accused was convicted and sentenced on charges of indecent assault. He applied for legal representation at State expense in order to prosecute an appeal against both conviction and sentence. Various representatives of the Legal Aid Board, as well as counsel approached directly by the applicant, concluded that there were no prospects of success on appeal. Accordingly, the LAB declined to provide representation at State expense.

The applicant then sought an order reviewing and setting aside this decision. He contended that he was entitled to assistance based on his right to legal representation at State expense.

The court noted that the Constitution entitled accused persons to legal representation at State expense if substantial injustice would otherwise result. The Board was required to determine whether a refusal to grant legal representation would result in substantial injustice to the applicant.

The Board's decision had not been arbitrary or capricious; it had considered the opinions of its own officers as well as that of outside counsel, all of whom were satisfied that there were no prospects of success on appeal. The Board was therefore entitled to conclude that a refusal to provide representation would not result in substantial injustice, especially when it was borne in mind that the Board's primary source of funds was the public purse, upon which there was substantial demand.

Therefore, the application was dismissed.

== Notes ==
- Ehrlich v CEO, Legal Aid Board, and Another 2006 (1) SACR 346 (E)
- Annual Survey of South African Law 2006, p 715
- (2006) 99 Servamus 73
- The Law of South Africa. Second Edition. LexisNexis Butterworths. Volume 5(2). Paragraph 237.
