= S v Sikhipha =

South African legal case

In S v Sikhipha (2006), Sikhipha was convicted of raping a thirteen-year-old girl and sentenced to life imprisonment. On appeal, Sikhipha contended on that the trial had been vitiated by various irregularities. Among these was the contention that he had been unrepresented, and that his rights had not been properly explained to him.

The court noted that whether an irregularity resulted in an unfair trial depended on whether or not the accused had been prejudiced.

In the present case the court held that Sikhipha had been apprised of his rights, and there was no indication that he had been prejudiced by the absence of a legal representative. There was no irregularity in this respect.

Where, however, an accused faces a charge as serious as that of rape, with a possible life sentence, he should not only be advised of his right to a legal representative, but encouraged to exercise it.

On the present facts, the accused had not been prejudiced. The appeal against conviction was dismissed, although there was an appeal against sentence which was upheld: The sentence of life imprisonment was set aside and a sentence of twenty years' imprisonment imposed instead.

== Notes ==
- S v Sikhipha 2006 (2) SACR 439 (SCA)
- Annual Survey of South African Law 2006, pp 749 & 790
