= Potter v Minahan =

Judgement of the High Court of Australia

- Court: High Court of Australia
- Full case name: Potter v Minahan
- Decided: 8 October 1908
- Citations: [1908] HCA 63, (1908) 7 CLR 277, 14 ALR 635

Case opinions
- (5:0) Appeal dismissed. "It is in the last degree improbable that the legislature would overthrow fundamental principles, infringe rights, or depart from the general system of law, without expressing its intention with irresistible clearness."
- Majority: Griffith CJ, Barton, O'Connor JJ
- Concurrence: Higgins J
- Concurrence: Isaacs J

Potter v Minahan is a landmark decision of the High Court of Australia which was the first to recognise the principle of legality, the notion that without specific legislative language to do otherwise, courts should uphold fundamental rights. The case is also noted for recognising the right to freedom of movement.

== Background ==
Occurring within the context of the White Australia policy, which restricted Chinese and Asian migration to Australia, the case concerned James Frances Kitchen Minahan, who had been born in Australia in 1876 to a Chinese father and an Australian-born Irish mother, but from the age of five had lived in China. In 1908, following his father's death, Minahan returned to Australia, and despite holding an Australian birth certificate, was arrested and gaoled on the grounds of being a prohibited immigrant under the Immigration Restriction Act. In April 1908, before the Victorian Court of Petty Sessions, Minahan was recognised to have remained domiciled in Victoria since birth and therefore could not be considered an immigrant under the Act. The Commonwealth appealed the decision to the High Court. Minahan was represented by Frank Gavan Duffy, later Chief Justice, and William Ah Ket, the first Chinese-Australian barrister.

== Decision ==
The joint judgement concurred with the lower court and held that Minahan had maintained his domicile in Australia since birth. Section 51 of the Australian constitution (immigration power) was ruled not to give the Commonwealth the capacity to restrict the entry of people who already had established their right of residency.

Isaacs and Higgins JJ concurred in the result but found for the defendant on a narrower basis, i.e. that the dictation test prescribed by the Immigration Restriction Act had not actually been performed on Minahan.
