= Judges' Rules =

Legal guidelines

The Judges' Rules are a set of guidelines about police and questioning and the acceptability of the resulting statements and confessions as evidence in court. Originally prepared for police in England, the Rules and their successor documents have become a part of legal procedure not just in Britain but in places as far afield as Jamaica, Zambia and Western Samoa where English law is followed.

In England and Wales the rules have been replaced by Code C made under the Police and Criminal Evidence Act 1984.

== History ==
The rules were first issued in 1912 by the judges of the King's Bench to give English police forces guidance on the procedures that they should follow in detaining and questioning suspects. The Home Secretary had requested the judges to explain how an investigation should be conducted to avoid the resulting evidence being ruled inadmissible in court. The rules were intended to halt a divergence in practice that had developed among different police forces, and replaced earlier informal guidance, such as Sir Howard Vincent's Police Code and Manual of Criminal Law.

The Judges' Rules were not rules of law, but rather rules of practice for the guidance of the police, setting out the kinds of conduct that could cause a judge to exercise discretion to exclude evidence, in the interests of a fair trial. High Court judge Lawrence J explained in R. v. Voisin [1918] 1 KB 531, that:

In 1912 the judges, at the request of the Home Secretary, drew up some rules as guidance for police officers. These rules have not the force of law; they are administrative directions the observance of which the police authorities should enforce upon their subordinates as tending to the fair administration of justice. It is important that they should do so, for statements obtained from prisoners, contrary to the spirit of these rules, may be rejected as evidence by the judge presiding at the trial.

The status of the Judges' Rules in Jamaica was considered by the Privy Council in February 2006 in Shabadine Peart v. The Queen.

== Rules ==
The rules did not alter the law on admissibility of evidence, but became a code of best practice: it was assumed that statements given by a suspect in accordance with the Rules would be admissible in evidence.

The rules:

- allowed the police to question any person with a view to finding out whether, or by whom, an offence had been committed
- required the police to give a caution when they had evidence to suspect that a person had committed an offence
- required a further caution when a person was charged and prohibited questioning after charging save in exceptional circumstances
- required a record of questioning to be kept
- gave guidance on the best way to record a formal written statement

The rules also included administrative guidance on access to defence counsel, and on questioning children and foreigners.

Five further rules were added to the original four rules in 1918, and the rules were further explained in 1934 in Home Office Circular 536053/23. The Rules were reissued in 1964 as Practice Note (Judge's Rules) [1964] 1 WLR 152, and were replaced in England and Wales in 1986 by Code C made under the Police and Criminal Evidence Act 1984 (PACE), a guideline that largely preserves the requirements set out in the rules.

== See also ==
- Miranda warning
- Miranda v. Arizona
