= Origins of the Fifth Amendment =

American History Book

- Author: Leonard W. Levy
- Subject: Legal history, Fifth Amendment to the United States Constitution
- Publisher: Oxford University Press
- Publication date: 1968
- Pages: 561
- OCLC: 439176

Origins of the Fifth Amendment: The Right Against Self-Incrimination by American historian Leonard W. Levy (Oxford University Press, 1968) won the 1969 Pulitzer Prize for History. It followed in the wake of the 1966 United States Supreme Court Opinion Miranda v. Arizona. The book was reissued in 1986 and 1999.
