= R v Singh =

2007 Supreme Court of Canada case

- Supreme Court of Canada

Hearing: May 23, 2007 Judgment: November 1, 2007
- Full case name: Jagrup Singh v Her Majesty the Queen
- Citations: [2007] 3 S.C.R. 405; 285 DLR (4th) 583; 369 NR 1; [2008] 1 WWR 191; 73 BCLR (4th) 1; 225 CCC (3d) 103; 51 CR (6th) 199; 249 BCAC 1; 163 CRR (2d) 280; 75 WCB (2d) 420; EYB 2007-125351; JE 2007-2037; [2007] SCJ No 48 (QL)
- Docket No.: 31558
- Prior history: J

Court membership
- Chief Justice: Beverley McLachlin; Puisne Justices: Michel Bastarache, Ian Binnie, Louis LeBel, Marie Deschamps, Morris Fish, Rosalie Abella, Louise Charron, Marshall Rothstein

Reasons given
- Majority: Charron J., joined by McLachlin, Bastarache, Rothstein and Deschamps JJ.
- Dissent: Fish J., joined by Abella, Lebel, and Binnie JJ.

R v Singh [2007] 3 S.C.R. 405, is a leading decision of the Supreme Court of Canada on the constitutional right to silence and the common law confessions rule.
