= Leonard W. Levy =

American historian (1923–2006)

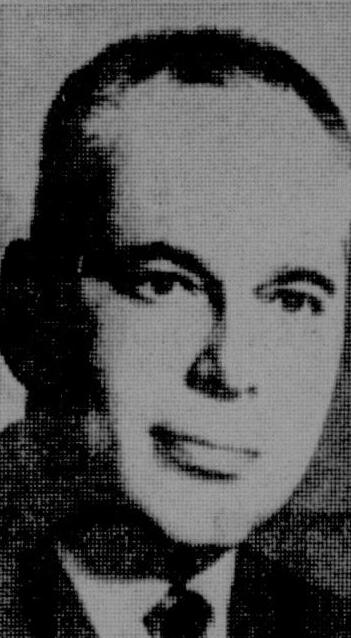
Levy in 1969

Leonard Williams Levy (April 9, 1923 – August 24, 2006) was an American historian, the Andrew W. Mellon All-Claremont Professor of Humanities and chairman of the Graduate Faculty of History at the Claremont Graduate School, California, who specialized in the history of basic American constitutional freedoms.

== Life and career ==
He was born in Toronto, Ontario, and educated at the University of Michigan as an undergraduate and then at Columbia University, where he received his Doctor of Philosophy (Ph.D.) under historian Henry Steele Commager.

Levy's first book was a revision and expansion of his doctoral dissertation on Lemuel Shaw, chief justice of the Massachusetts Supreme Judicial Court. The Law of the Commonwealth and Chief Justice Shaw was first published by Harvard University Press in 1957, and has regularly been reprinted.

Levy's most honored book was his 1968 study Origins of the Fifth Amendment, focusing on the history of the privilege against self-incrimination. This book was awarded the 1969 Pulitzer Prize for History. He wrote almost forty other books, such as The Establishment Clause, Treason Against God: A History of the Offense of Blasphemy, Blasphemy: Verbal Offenses Against the Sacred, from Moses to Salman Rushdie, and Religion and the First Amendment. He also was editor-in-chief of the four-volume Encyclopaedia of The American Constitution. In his 1999 Origins of the Bill of Rights he described the political background and intent of most of the amendments in the Bill of Rights.

Levy's most controversial work focused on the early history of freedom of the press in colonial and revolutionary America. In 1960 he published Legacy of Suppression: Freedom of Speech and Press in Early American History, in which he argued that the law governing freedom of the press, and thus the original intention of the First Amendment's free-press clauses, was narrower than the generally libertarian views held by James Madison, and, in particular, that the law of freedom of the press included the old English common law crime of seditious libel. Levy's work challenged the prevailing views codified in the work of Zechariah Chafee, who had long taught at the Harvard Law School. As a pendant to his 1960 monograph, he published Jefferson and Civil Liberties: The Darker Side in 1963; this book offered a vigorous critique of Thomas Jefferson for holding narrower views of freedom of speech and press than has long been believed. Jefferson and Civil Liberties began the modern reconsideration of Jefferson's historical reputation. In the 1973 paperback edition, Levy added an extensive preface discussing and responding to the criticism that the book received for being critical of Jefferson.

In 1985 after nearly two decades of research, Levy published Emergence of a Free Press, a thorough and wide-ranging revision of Legacy of Suppression. Emergence of a Free Press received the 1986 Mencken Award for Best Book from the Free Press Association. While maintaining that his earlier views of the state of the law were correct, Levy acknowledged the criticisms posed by historians of journalism, who stressed the difference between "law on the books" and "law as applied". Thus, Levy conceded that in actuality freedom of the press may well have been wider and more generous than his earlier book had posited.

In 1990 Levy was appointed a distinguished scholar in residence; adjunct professor of history and political science at Southern Oregon State College in Ashland, Oregon. He died August 24, 2006, in Ashland.

== Works ==
- The Law of the Commonwealth and Chief Justice Shaw (Harvard University Press, 1957)
- Legacy of Suppression: Freedom of Speech and Press in Early American History (Harvard University Press, 1960)
- Jefferson and Civil Liberties: The Darker Side (Harvard University Press, 1963)
- Freedom of the Press From Zenger to Jefferson: Early American Libertarian Theories (Carolina Academic Press, January 1, 1966)
- Judicial Review and the Supreme Court (1967)
- Origins of the Fifth Amendment: The Right Against Self-Incrimination (New York: Oxford University Press, 1968) (1969 Pulitzer Prize for History)
- The Supreme Court Under Earl Warren (New York: Quadrangle Books, 1972)
- Judgments: Essays on American Constitutional History (Chicago: Quadrangle Books, 1972)
- Against the Law: The Nixon Court and Criminal Justice (New York: Harper and Row, 1974)
- Treason Against God: A History of the Offense of Blasphemy (New York: Schocken Books, 1981)
- A Conversation with Leonard W. Levy by George Forsyth (1982)
- Emergence of a Free Press (New York: Oxford University Press, 1985)
- Religion and the First Amendment (New York: Macmillan, 1986)
- The Establishment Clause: Religion and the First Amendment (Chapel Hill: University of North Carolina Press, 1989)
- Blasphemy: Verbal Offense Against the Sacred, From Moses to Salman Rushdie (New York: Alfred A. Knopf, 1993)
- The Origins of the Bill of Rights (New Haven, Connecticut: Yale University Press, 1999)
- Original Intent and the Framers' Constitution (Ivan R. Dee Publisher, January 1, 2000)
- The Palladium of Justice: Origins of Trial by Jury (Ivan R. Dee Publisher, 2000)
