= Adverse inference =

Principle of common law

Adverse inference is a legal inference, adverse to the concerned party, drawn from silence or absence of requested evidence. It is part of evidence codes based on common law in various countries.

== In the United States ==
Adverse inference applies in United States civil trials, but not criminal trials; criminal defendants are protected by the Fifth Amendment, which guarantees a right against self-incrimination (including self-incrimination by way of silence).

In civil trials, adverse inference may be imposed as a sanction by the court in reaction to spoliation, such as willful destruction of relevant emails. In this case, the court may direct a jury to assume that the evidence that was destroyed was negative for the destroying party, i.e., that it was destroyed to hide something. This applies not only to evidence destroyed but also to evidence existing but not produced by the party as well as to evidence under a party's control but not produced. See Notice to produce. The adverse inference is based upon the presumption that the party who controls the evidence would have produced it if it had been supportive to their case.

Adverse inference can also apply to a witness who is known to exist whom a party refuses to identify or produce. In such a case it is also known as the Missing-Witness Rule, or the Empty-Chair Doctrine.

== In English law ==
After a change in the law in 1994, the right to silence under English law was amended because the court and jury were allowed to draw adverse inference from such a silence. Under English law, the police, cautioning someone, say, "You do not have to say anything. But it may harm your defence if you do not mention, when questioned, something which you later rely on in court". Under English law, the court and the jury may draw an adverse inference from fact that someone did not mention a defence when given the chance to do so if charged with an offence.
