= Self-incrimination =

Act of exposing oneself to an accusation of crime

In criminal law, self-incrimination is the act of making a statement that exposes oneself to an accusation of criminal liability or prosecution. Self-incrimination can occur either directly or indirectly: directly, by means of interrogation where information of a self-incriminatory nature is disclosed; or indirectly, when information of a self-incriminatory nature is disclosed voluntarily without pressure from another person.

In many legal systems, accused criminals cannot be compelled to incriminate themselves—they may choose to speak to police or other authorities, but they cannot be punished for refusing to do so.

There are 108 countries and jurisdictions that currently issue legal warnings to suspects, which include the right to remain silent. These laws are not uniform across the world; however, members of the European Union have developed their laws around the EU's guide.

== History ==
How the privilege of self-incrimination came to be established in the common law continues to be debated by legal historians. The most influential account of the common law origins of the privilege against self-incrimination is Leonard Levy's Origins of the Fifth Amendment:

It was in its origins, unquestionably the invention of those who were guilty of religious crimes...and, later, of political crimes...more often than not, the offense was merely criticism of the government, its policies, or its officers. The right was associated then with guilty for crimes of conscience, of belief, and of association. In the broadest sense it was a protection not of the guilty, or of the innocent, but of the freedom of expression, of political liberty, of the right to worship as one pleased.

Levy argued that the privilege had ancient common law roots, whereas Wigmore said the privilege developed later, in the 17th century, to protect religious dissidents from inquisitorial oaths. Richard H. Helmholz has written that the privilege developed in other courts.

Levy explicitly connected the privilege of self-incrimination to the common law's prohibition of coerced confessions. There has been substantial opposition to extending the privilege to modern police investigations. The expansion of the principle to ahistoric contexts was harshly criticized by Edward Corwin and Harvard Law School dean Roscoe Pound.

== By country ==
=== Australia ===
A limited right against self-incrimination exists at common law in Australia, but is not protected by the federal constitution or at state level where the majority of criminal law prosecutions take place. In Sorby v Commonwealth (1983), the High Court affirmed that the common-law privilege against self-incrimination could only be abrogated by explicit statutory provisions. A number of federal statutes require individuals to provide truthful answers to questions posed by government agencies – including the Australian Crime Commission, Australian Competition & Consumer Commission, Australian Security Intelligence Organisation and Australian Securities & Investments Commission – and provide no exemption for self-incriminatory statements.

=== Canada ===
In Canada, similar rights exist pursuant to the Charter of Rights and Freedoms. Section 11 of the Charter provides that one cannot be compelled to be a witness in a proceeding against oneself. Section 11(c) states:

Any person charged with an offence has the right ... not to be compelled to be a witness in proceedings against that person in respect of the offence ...

An important caveat in Canadian law is that this does not apply to a person who is not charged in the case in question. A person issued a subpoena, who is not charged in respect of the offence being considered, must give testimony. However, this testimony cannot later be used against the person in another case, as Section 13 of the Charter states:

A witness who testifies in any proceedings has the right not to have any incriminating evidence so given used to incriminate that witness in any other proceedings, except in a prosecution for perjury or for the giving of contradictory evidence.

Historically, in Canadian common law, witnesses could refuse to give testimony that would self-incriminate. However, section 5(1) of the Canada Evidence Act eliminated that absolute common law privilege by instead compelling witnesses to testify. In exchange, section 5(2) of the same act granted the witnesses immunity from having that evidence used against them in the future except in the case of perjury or impeachment. While these provisions of the Canada Evidence Act are still operational, they have been overtaken in their application by the immunities granted by sections 13 and 7 of the Canadian Charter of Rights and Freedoms.

=== China ===
After the 1996 amendments to the Criminal Procedure Law, Article 15 states that "It shall be strictly prohibited to extort confessions by torture, gather evidence by threat, enticement, deceit, or other illegal means, or force anyone to commit self-incrimination." In 2012 the law was also re-amended to strengthen the human rights protection of criminal suspects. China has since recognized the right against self-incrimination and forced confessions are prohibited by law. However, in practice as human rights violations in China continue to be committed, it is still common practice for police to use torture on suspects to obtain forced confessions. China's accession to the United Nations's International Covenant on Civil and Political Rights in 1998 also guarantees Chinese citizens the right against self-incrimination; however, China has not ratified the treaty.

=== India ===
In India, under Article 20 (3) of the Constitution, the defendant has the right against self-incrimination, but witnesses are not given the same right. A defendant must be informed of their rights before making any statements that may incriminate them. Defendants must not be compelled to give any statements. In the case that a defendant is pressured into giving a statement that is self-incriminating, the statement will not be admissible in a court of law. The Code of Criminal Procedure and the Indian Constitution give defendants the Right to Silence, i.e. the right to withhold self-incriminating information to authorities. Defendants must inform the authorities that they are exercising their Right to Silence; withholding information is not considered using their right to withhold information that can potentially be self-incriminating. In order to exercise their right to remain silent, the defendant must verbally and clearly state that they are doing so. For example, a defendant can say, "I am exercising my right to remain silent and will not be answering any further questions." Article 20 (3) does not pertain to those who made a confession willingly without being intimidated or coerced into making such statement.

=== United Kingdom ===
==== England and Wales ====
The current statutory basis for the privilege against self-incrimination for defendants in criminal trials in England and Wales is the Criminal Evidence Act 1898 s1(2) (as amended):

a person charged in criminal proceedings who is called as a witness in the proceedings may be asked any question in cross-examination notwithstanding that it would tend to criminate him as to any offence with which he is charged in the proceedings

Applying to England and Wales, the Criminal Justice and Public Order Act 1994 amended the right to silence by allowing inferences to be drawn by the jury in cases where a suspect refuses to explain something, and then later produces an explanation. In other words, the jury is entitled to infer that the accused fabricated the explanation at a later date, since the accused refused to provide the explanation during the time of the police questioning. The jury is also free not to make such an inference.

=== Scotland ===
In Scots criminal and civil law, both common and statute law originated and operate separately from that in England and Wales. In Scots law, the right to silence remains unchanged by the above, and juries' rights to draw inferences are severely curtailed.

On January 25, 2018, the law in Scotland changed in regard to people being detained by police. These changes only affect people who are arrested after January 25, 2018. Those who are arrested have 'the right to remain silent' and are not obligated to answer questions asked by police. However, although someone being detained by police does not need to answer questions regarding the crime they are accused of, it is mandatory for detainees to answer basic questions of identity such as: name, date of birth, address, and nationality.

=== United States ===
The Fifth Amendment to the United States Constitution protects the accused from being forced to incriminate themselves in a crime. The Amendment reads:

No person ... shall be compelled in any criminal case to be a witness against himself ...

Additionally, under the Miranda ruling, a person also has the right to remain silent while in police custody so as not to reveal any incriminating information. In order to invoke this constitutional right to remain silent, a person must explicitly and unambiguously tell officers that they are exercising this right to remain silent. Therefore, staying silent without a prior exclamation that one is exercising this constitutional right does not invoke the right.

In Miranda v. Arizona (1966), the United States Supreme Court ruled that the Fifth Amendment privilege against self-incrimination requires law enforcement officials to advise a suspect interrogated in custody of them their right to remain silent and their right to an attorney. Justice Robert H. Jackson further notes that "any lawyer worth his salt will tell the suspect in no uncertain terms to make no statement to police under any circumstances".

Miranda warnings must be given before there is any "questioning initiated by law enforcement officers after a person has been taken into custody or otherwise deprived of his freedom of action in any significant way". Suspects must be warned, prior to the interrogation, that they have the right to remain silent, that anything they say may be used against them in a court of law, that they have the right to have an attorney and if one cannot afford an attorney, one will be appointed to defend such person. Further, only after such warnings are given and understood, may the individual knowingly waive them and agree to answer questions or make a statement.

It is also important to note that the Fifth Amendment protects certain types of evidence, specifically testimonial evidence, which are statements that are spoken by the person in question that are made under oath. For a list of other different types of evidence, see Evidence (law).

==== Shift in court decision regarding handcuff usage ====
The United States Supreme Court rulings of Miranda v. Arizona and Terry v. Ohio leave questions about the types of conduct that are appropriate for both the protection of the public, and criminal suspects' constitutional rights. The use of handcuffs on a suspect during a Terry stop infringes on their Fourth and Fifth Amendment rights. During the action of handcuffing a suspect, a custodial environment is created, thereby invoking the information of that individual's Miranda rights. The Second Circuit Court maintained the notion that by utilizing handcuffs during a Terry stop, that stop is then automatically transformed into an arrest, thus warranting the reading of Miranda rights, up until the decision of US versus Fiseku.

In holdings of U.S. versus Fiseku, the defendant argues that the officers’ use of handcuffs convert a Terry stop into an arrest without probable cause, thus violating his Fourth Amendment rights. The District Court ruled in disagreement with this matter, suggesting that there were unusual circumstances surrounding the investigatory stop, requiring the use of handcuffs in order to ensure the protection of those officers involved. This differs from Second Circuit court rulings of the past.

In the case of U.S. vs. Newton, a police officer is permitted to utilize handcuffs during a Terry stop if the officer has reason to believe that the detainee poses an immediate physical threat, and that by handcuffing the individual, the potential threat is defused in the least invasive means possible.

In the case of U.S. vs. Bailey, the Second Circuit court found the officers' original stop to be constitutional, but ruled that the events which transpired after handcuffing took place fell outside the realm of a constitutional Terry stop. This results from both suspects having already been patted down and deemed unarmed. At which point, the officers had no authority to handcuff either of these men, as they were already proven to be non-threatening.

In both cases, the Second Circuit court made the determination that the use of handcuffs converted these stops into arrests, and were grounds for Miranda. The ruling of U.S. versus Fiseku disrupts this conversion trend by determining otherwise. The grounds for this holding are ambiguous, given the striking similarities between this court ruling and those of Newton and Bailey. The new verdict could potentially be instituted to enable police officials to impede on citizens' constitutional rights as long as the technique being used is considered to be less intrusive than that of an officer pulling his or her gun on an unarmed suspect.

==== Truthful statements by an innocent person ====
An incriminating statement includes any statement that tends to increase the danger that the person making the statement will be accused, charged or prosecuted – even if the statement is true, and even if the person is innocent of any crime. Thus, even a person who is innocent of any crime who testifies truthfully can be incriminated by that testimony. The United States Supreme Court has stated that the Fifth Amendment privilege

protects the innocent as well as the guilty. ... one of the Fifth Amendment's basic functions ... is to protect innocent men ... who otherwise might be ensnared by ambiguous circumstances. ... truthful responses of an innocent witness, as well as those of a wrongdoer, may provide the government with incriminating evidence from the speaker's own mouth.

The U.S. Supreme Court has also stated:

Too many, even those who should be better advised, view this privilege as a shelter for wrongdoers. They too readily assume that those who invoke it are either guilty of crime or commit perjury in claiming the privilege.

== See also ==
- Privilege (evidence)
- Right to silence
- Burden of proof (law)
- Reverse onus
