= United States v. Miller (1985) =

United States v Miller
- Supreme Court of the United States

Argued January 16, 1985 Decided April 1, 1985
- Full case name: United States v James Rual Miller
- Docket no.: 83-1750
- Citations: 471 U.S. 130 (more)
- Argument: Oral argument
- Opinion announcement: Opinion announcement

Case history
- Prior: 728 F.2d 1269, 715 F.2d 1360

Holding
- The Fifth Amendment's Grand Jury Clause is not violated if a trial jury finds a defendant guilty without having found all of an indictment's parts proven.

Court membership
- Chief Justice Warren E. Burger Associate Justices William J. Brennan Jr. · Byron White; Thurgood Marshall · Harry Blackmun; Lewis F. Powell Jr. · William Rehnquist; John P. Stevens · Sandra Day O'Connor

Case opinion
- Majority: Marshall, joined by Burger, Brennan, White, Blackmun, Rehnquist, Stevens, O'Connor
- Powell took no part in the consideration or decision of the case.

Laws applied
- V Amendment, Grand Jury Clause
- This case overturned a previous ruling or rulings
- Ex parte Bain, 121 U.S. 1 (1887)

United States v. James Miller, 471 U.S. 130 (1985) was a Supreme Court case in which the court held that the Fifth Amendment's Grand Jury Clause is not violated if a federal defendant is found guilty by a trial jury without having found "all" parts of an indictment proved. This case partly overruled Ex parte Bain, 121 U.S. 1 (1887), in that a grand jury's indictment is not "final", and its scope for conviction may be narrowed by the prosecution during trial. This case allows for prosecutors to simply prove a defendant committed criminal acts at least mentioned in an indictment, but need not prove all the allegations in their entirety.

== Historical Context ==
James Rual Miller was the owner of San Francisco Scrap Metals Inc, a company which purchased scrap wires in bulk, stripped them, and resold them for profit. Miller was charged with violating 3 counts of mail fraud (18 U.S.C. 1341) when on July 15, 1981, he reported 201,000 pounds of copper wire were stolen from his business to the police, and subsequently to his business insurance provider Aetna. Suspicions arose when it was discovered that only weeks prior to the alleged theft, Miller had increased his insurance policy coverage from $50,000 to $150,000, a policy which coincidentally was set to expire on the day of the theft.

Throughout the proceedings, evidence showed that Miller had inflated the amount of copper wire that was stolen, and thus its value, to Aetna. This was shown by business records from a company showing Miller buying an amount of copper wire but also selling it to another company, this was further cemented by testimony from various employees of Miller's company saying there was "no way" Miller had anything close to 201,000 pounds of copper wire on hand. Ultimately, the charges rested on the fact that Miller's claim for compensation was sent through the mail, and that $50,000 of the $150,000 in compensation from Aetna was also sent through the mail. Miller's third charge was also subsequently dropped.

The indictment in question alleged all of these claims, and purportedly the fact that Mr. Miller had prior knowledge and consented to the burglary to claim the insurance money. The prosecution during his trial managed to prove that Miller had inflated the amount of copper he had at his business, however did not attempt to prove any fact that Miller had known and consented to the burglary beforehand. After the prosecution had rested their case, it moved to strike the "false burglary" part of the indictment, which was opposed by the defense and by the court. The defense then moved for a directed verdict of not guilty which was denied, and a subsequent motion at the conclusion of all the evidence was also denied. After the trial concluded, the judge instructed the jury that the government only had to prove "one or more of the acts" in order to prove the scheme. With this instruction the jury returned a verdict of guilty on both counts.

=== The Circuit Court of Appeals for the Ninth Circuit Reversal ===
After his conviction, Miller subsequently filed an appeal with the United States Court of Appeals for the Ninth Circuit which made its decision on September 13, 1983. The Court of Appeals ultimately sided with Miller and reversed his conviction, saying,

"Because we conclude that the government failed to prove the scheme pleaded in the indictment, we reverse Miller's conviction." - 9th Cir. Opinion. Circuit Judge John Weld Peck II.

The basis for the reversal rests on the indictment, which reads,

"6. It was a further part of the scheme that (James Rual Miller) well knew that the alleged burglary was committed with his knowledge and consent for the purpose of obtaining the insurance proceeds." (previous sections omitted)

The court found Miller's argument persuasive, in that the government through the indictment had to prove "a unitary scheme to defraud" committed by Miller, which the prosecution did not in its entirety prove. He argued that due to the prosecution failing to prove he had prior knowledge of the burglary, and therefore failing to prove the scheme laid out in the indictment, his Fifth Amendment right to a grand jury was violated. The Court agreed, stating,

"In United States v. Mastelotto, 717 F.2d 1238 (9th Cir. 1983), this court held that "[a mail fraud] defendant cannot be convicted of a count charging participation in a fraudulent scheme Y where the grand jury indicted based on his participation in a fraudulent scheme X, even if the schemes themselves overlap or are concentric."

So with its opinion the Circuit Court vacated Miller's conviction, a decision which Solicitor General Rex E. Lee appealed to the Supreme Court.

== Decision of the Supreme Court ==
Argued on January 16, 1985, the Supreme Court heard oral arguments and announced its decision on April 1 of the same year. With a unanimous decision the Court ruled in favor of the United States, thereby vacating the judgement of the Circuit Court. Justice Thurgood Marshall wrote the opinion of the Court, with Justice Lewis F. Powell Jr. not participating.

The decision was based on the fact the Circuit Court of Appeal's decision was apparently contradictory to many other Fifth Amendment cases the Supreme Court had decided in the past, such as Ford v. United States, 273 U.S. 593, stating,

"Convictions generally have been sustained as long as the proof upon which they are based corresponds to an offense that was clearly set out in the indictment. A part of the indictment unnecessary to and independent of the allegations of the offense proved may normally be treated as "a useless averment" that "may be ignored." Ford v. United States, 273 U.S. at 273 U. S. 602."

It cited the important case of Ex parte Bain which held a very strict interpretation of the right to a grand jury, in essence saying that nothing could be added or removed from an indictment, no matter how trivial, without the consent of the grand jury. This decision however upheld the part of Bain which long said that, "nothing can be added to an indictment without the concurrence of the grand jury by which the bill was found" (as cited in United States v Norris, 281 U.S. 619 (1930)). However, it overrule Bain in part, saying,

"To the extent Bain stands for the proposition that it constitutes an unconstitutional amendment to drop from an indictment those allegations that are unnecessary to an offense that is clearly contained within it, that case has simply not survived. To avoid further confusion, we now explicitly reject that proposition."

The Court argues that eroding this part of Bain isn't a radical step, saying that the "removal" of a part or allegation of an indictment hasn't been a very commonly used argument.

With that, a part of Bain was overruled, something the Court considered even further in United States v. Cotton, 535 U.S. 625 (2002).
