= Miller v. United States =

Miller v. United States may refer to the following United States Supreme Court cases:

- Miller v. United States (1870)
- Miller v. United States (1914)
- Miller v. United States (1935)
- Miller v. United States (1942)
- Miller v. United States (1958), a 1958 case on lawful arrest under the Fourth Amendment

== See also ==
- United States v. Miller (disambiguation)
- Lists of United States Supreme Court cases
- Lists of United States Supreme Court cases by volume
