= Fifth Amendment to the United States Constitution =

1791 amendment enumerating due process rights

The Fifth Amendment (Amendment V) to the United States Constitution enumerates several constitutional rights and limits governmental powers with respect to criminal procedure. It was ratified, along with nine other amendments, in 1791 as part of the Bill of Rights.

The Supreme Court has extended most, but not all, rights of the Fifth Amendment to the state and local levels. This means that neither the federal, state, nor local governments may deny people most rights protected by the Fifth Amendment. The Court furthered most protections of this amendment through the Due Process Clause of the Fourteenth Amendment.

One provision of the Fifth Amendment requires that most felonies be tried only upon indictment by a grand jury, a requirement that the Court has ruled does not apply to the state level. Another provision, the Double Jeopardy Clause, provides the right of defendants to be tried only once in federal court for the same offense. The Self-Incrimination clause provides various protections against self-incrimination, including the right of an individual not to serve as a witness in a criminal case in which he or she is a defendant. "Pleading the Fifth" is a colloquial term often used to invoke the Self-Incrimination Clause when witnesses decline to answer questions where the answers might incriminate them. In the 1966 landmark case Miranda v. Arizona, the Supreme Court held that the Self-Incrimination Clause requires the police to issue a Miranda warning to criminal suspects interrogated while in police custody. The Fifth Amendment also contains the Takings Clause, which allows the federal government to take private property only for public use and only if it provides "just compensation".

Like the Fourteenth Amendment, the Fifth Amendment includes a due process clause stating that no person shall "be deprived of life, liberty, or property, without due process of law". The Fifth Amendment's Due Process Clause applies to the federal government, while the Fourteenth Amendment's Due Process Clause applies to state governments (and by extension, local governments). The Supreme Court has interpreted the Fifth Amendment's Due Process Clause to provide two main protections: procedural due process, which requires government officials to follow fair procedures before depriving a person of life, liberty, or property, and substantive due process, which protects certain fundamental rights from government interference. The Supreme Court has also held that the Due Process Clause contains a prohibition against vague laws and an implied equal protection requirement similar to the Fourteenth Amendment's Equal Protection Clause.

== Text ==
The amendment as ratified by the states:

No person shall be held to answer for a capital, or otherwise infamous crime, unless on a presentment or indictment of a Grand Jury, except in cases arising in the land or naval forces, or in the Militia, when in actual service in time of war or public danger; nor shall any person be subject for the same offense to be twice put in jeopardy of life or limb; nor shall be compelled in any criminal case to be a witness against himself, nor be deprived of life, liberty, or property, without due process of law; nor shall private property be taken for public use, without just compensation.

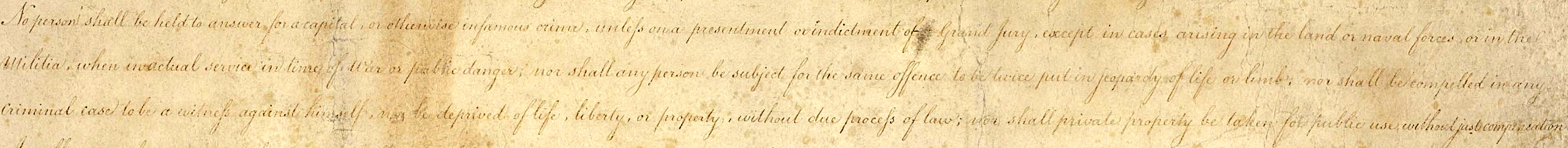
The hand-written copy of the proposed Bill of Rights, cropped to show just the text that would later be ratified as the Fifth Amendment

== Background before adoption ==
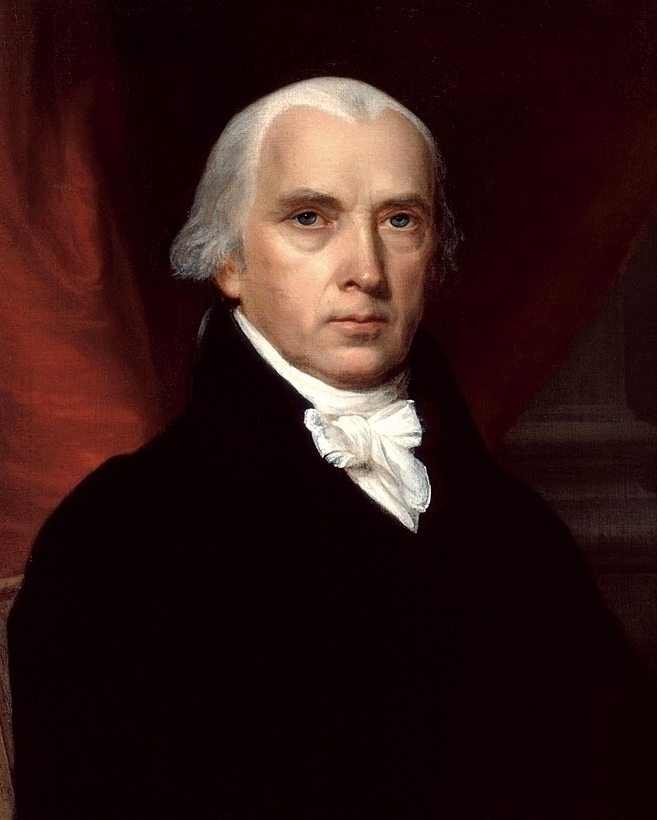
James Madison, drafter of the Bill of Rights, by John Vanderlyn

On June 8, 1789, Congressman James Madison introduced several proposed constitutional amendments during a speech to the House of Representatives. His draft language that later became the Fifth Amendment was as follows:

No person shall be subject, except in cases of impeachment, to more than one punishment or trial for the same offense; nor shall be compelled to be a witness against himself; nor be deprived of life, liberty, or property, without due process of law; nor be obliged to relinquish his property, where it may be necessary for public use, without just compensation. ...Except in cases of impeachments, and cases arising in the land or naval forces, or the militia when on actual service, in time of war or public danger ... in all crimes punishable with loss of life or member, presentment or indictment by a grand jury shall be an essential preliminary ...

This draft was edited by Congress; all the material before the first ellipsis was placed at the end, and some of the wording was modified. After approval by Congress, the amendment was ratified by the states on December 15, 1791, as part of the Bill of Rights. Every one of the five clauses in the final amendment appeared in Madison's draft, and in their final order those clauses are: the Grand Jury Clause (which Madison had placed last); the Double Jeopardy Clause; the Self Incrimination Clause; the Due Process Clause; and, the Takings Clause.

== Grand jury ==
The Grand Jury Clause limits governmental powers focusing on criminal procedures, because, as stated by the U.S. Supreme Court in United States v. Cotton (2002), "the Fifth Amendment grand jury right serves a vital function in providing for a body of citizens that acts as a check on prosecutorial power. No doubt that is true. See, e. g., 3 Story, Commentaries on the Constitution § 1779 (1883), reprinted in 5 The Founders' Constitution 295 (P. Kurland & R. Lerner eds. 1987). But that is surely no less true of the Sixth Amendment right to a petit jury, which, unlike the grand jury, must find guilt beyond a reasonable doubt." The grand jury is a pre-constitutional common law institution. The Supreme Court ruled against incorporating this right (extending it to the states) in Hurtado v. People of California, 110 U.S. 516 (1884). Most states have an alternative civil process. "Although state systems of criminal procedure differ greatly among themselves, the grand jury is similarly guaranteed by many state constitutions and plays an important role in fair and effective law enforcement in the overwhelming [p688] majority of the States." Branzburg v. Hayes (No. 70-85) 1972. Grand juries, which return indictments in many criminal cases, are composed of a jury of peers and operate in closed deliberation proceedings; they are given specific instructions regarding the law by the judge. Many constitutional restrictions that apply in court or in other situations do not apply during grand jury proceedings. For example, the exclusionary rule does not apply to certain evidence presented to a grand jury; the exclusionary rule states that evidence obtained in violation of the Fourth, Fifth or Sixth amendments cannot be introduced in court.

The Bill of Rights in the National Archives

Currently, federal law permits the trial of misdemeanors without indictments. Additionally, in trials of non-capital felonies, the prosecution may proceed without indictments if the defendants waive their Fifth Amendment right.

Grand jury indictments may be amended by the prosecution only in limited circumstances. In Ex Parte Bain, 121 U.S. 1 (1887), the Supreme Court held that the indictment could not be changed at all by the prosecution. United States v. Miller, 471 U.S. 130 (1985) partly reversed Ex parte Bain; now, an indictment's scope may be narrowed by the prosecution. Thus, lesser included charges may be dropped, but new charges may not be added.

The Grand Jury Clause of the Fifth Amendment does not protect those serving in the armed forces, whether during wartime or peacetime. Members of the state militia called up to serve with federal forces are not protected under the clause either. In O'Callahan v. Parker, 395 U.S. 258 (1969), the Supreme Court held that only charges relating to service may be brought against members of the militia without indictments. As a decision, O'Callahan, however, lived for a limited duration and was more a reflection of Justice William O. Douglas's distrust of presidential power and anger at the Vietnam Conflict. O'Callahan was overturned in 1987, when the Court held that members of the militia in actual service may be tried for any offense without indictments.

The grand jury indictment clause of the Fifth Amendment has not been incorporated under the Fourteenth Amendment. This means the grand jury requirement applies only to felony charges in the federal court system. While many states do employ grand juries, no defendant has a Fifth Amendment right to a grand jury for criminal charges in state court. States are free to abolish grand juries, and many (though not all) have replaced them with preliminary hearing.

=== Infamous crime ===
Whether a crime is "infamous", for purposes of the Grand Jury Clause, is determined by the nature of the punishment that may be imposed, not the punishment that is actually imposed; however, crimes punishable by death must be tried upon indictments. The historical origin of "infamous crime" comes from the infamia, a punishment under Roman law by which a citizen was deprived of his citizenship. In United States v. Moreland, 258 U.S. 433 (1922), the Supreme Court held that incarceration in a prison or penitentiary, as opposed to a correction or reformation house, attaches infamy to a crime. In Mackin v. United States, 117 U.S. 348 (1886), the Supreme Court judged that "'Infamous crimes' are thus, in the most explicit words, defined to be those 'punishable by imprisonment in the penitentiary'", while it later in Green v. United States 356 U.S. 165 (1957) stated that "imprisonment in a penitentiary can be imposed only if a crime is subject to imprisonment exceeding one year." Therefore, an infamous crime is one that is punished by imprisonment for over one year. Susan Brown, a former defense attorney and Professor of Law at the University of Dayton School of Law, concluded: "Since this is essentially the definition of a felony, infamous crimes translate as felonies."

== Double jeopardy ==
... nor shall any person be subject for the same offense to be twice put in jeopardy of life or limb ...

The Double Jeopardy Clause encompasses four distinct prohibitions: subsequent prosecution after acquittal, subsequent prosecution after conviction, subsequent prosecution after certain mistrials, and multiple punishment in the same indictment. Jeopardy applies when the jury is empaneled in a jury trial, when the first witness is sworn in during a bench trial, or when a plea is rendered.

=== Prosecution after acquittal ===
The government is not permitted to appeal or try again after the entry of an acquittal, whether a directed verdict before the case is submitted to the jury, a directed verdict after a deadlocked jury, an appellate reversal for sufficiency (except by direct appeal to a higher appellate court), or an "implied acquittal" via conviction of a lesser included offense. In addition, the government is barred by collateral estoppel from re-litigating against the same defense, a fact necessarily found by the jury in a prior acquittal, even if the jury hung on other counts.

This principle does not prevent the government from appealing a pre-trial motion to dismiss or other non-merits dismissal, or a directed verdict after a jury conviction, nor does it prevent the trial judge from entertaining a motion for reconsideration of a directed verdict, if the jurisdiction has so provided by rule or statute. Nor does it prevent the government from retrying the defendant after an appellate reversal other than for sufficiency, including habeas, or "thirteenth juror" appellate reversals notwithstanding sufficiency on the principle that jeopardy has not "terminated". There is also an exception for judicial bribery in a bench trial.

=== Multiple punishment, including prosecution after conviction ===
In Blockburger v. United States (1932), the Supreme Court announced the following test: the government may separately try to punish the defendant for two crimes if each crime contains an element that the other does not. Blockburger is the default rule, unless the legislature intends to depart; for example, Continuing Criminal Enterprise (CCE) may be punished separately from its predicates, as can conspiracy.

The Blockburger test, originally developed in the multiple punishments context, is also the test for prosecution after conviction. In Grady v. Corbin (1990), the Court held that a double jeopardy violation could lie even where the Blockburger test was satisfied, but Grady was overruled in United States v. Dixon (1993).

=== Prosecution after mistrial ===
The rule for mistrials depends upon who sought the mistrial. If the defendant moves for a mistrial, there is no bar to retrial, unless the prosecutor acted in "bad faith", i.e., goaded the defendant into moving for a mistrial because the government specifically wanted a mistrial. If the prosecutor moves for a mistrial, there is no bar to retrial if the trial judge finds "manifest necessity" for granting the mistrial. The same standard governs mistrials granted sua sponte.

=== Prosecution in different states ===
In Heath v. Alabama (1985), the Supreme Court held that the Fifth Amendment rule against double jeopardy does not prohibit two different states from separately prosecuting and convicting the same individual for the same illegal act.

== Self-incrimination ==
The Fifth Amendment protects individuals from being forced to incriminate themselves. Incriminating oneself is defined as exposing oneself (or another person) to "an accusation or charge of crime", or as involving oneself (or another person) "in a criminal prosecution or the danger thereof". The privilege against compelled self-incrimination is defined as "the constitutional right of a person to refuse to answer questions or otherwise give testimony against himself". To "plead the Fifth" is to refuse to answer any question because "the implications of the question, in the setting in which it is asked" lead a claimant to possess a "reasonable cause to apprehend danger from a direct answer", believing that "a responsive answer to the question or an explanation of why it cannot be answered might be dangerous because injurious disclosure could result."

Historically, the legal protection against compelled self-incrimination was directly related to the question of torture for extracting information and confessions.

The legal shift away from widespread use of torture and forced confession dates to the turmoil of the late 16th and early 17th century in England.

The Supreme Court of the United States has held that "a witness may have a reasonable fear of prosecution and yet be innocent of any wrongdoing. The privilege serves to protect the innocent who otherwise might be ensnared by ambiguous circumstances."

However, Professor James Joseph Duane of the Regent University School of Law argues that the Supreme Court, in a 5–4 decision in Salinas v. Texas, significantly weakened the privilege, saying "your choice to use the Fifth Amendment privilege can be used against you at trial depending exactly how and where you do it."

In the Salinas case, Justices Alito, Roberts, and Kennedy held that "the Fifth Amendment's privilege against self-incrimination does not extend to defendants who simply decide to remain mute during questioning. Long-standing judicial precedent has held that any witness who desires protection against self-incrimination must explicitly claim that protection."

Justice Thomas, siding with Alito, Roberts and Kennedy, in a separate opinion, held that, "Salinas' Fifth Amendment privilege would not have been applicable even if invoked because the prosecutor's testimony regarding his silence did not compel Salinas to give self-incriminating testimony." Justice Antonin Scalia joined Thomas' opinion.

=== Legal proceedings and congressional hearings ===
On July 29, 2026, during a Senate Homeland Security and Governmental Affairs Committee hearing on the COVID-19 pandemic, Dr. Anthony Fauci pleaded the fifth a total of 111 times during questioning, the most in American history.

The Fifth Amendment privilege against compulsory self-incrimination applies when an individual is called to testify in a legal proceeding. The Supreme Court ruled that the privilege applies whether the witness is in a federal court or, under the incorporation doctrine of the Fourteenth Amendment, in a state court, and whether the proceeding itself is criminal or civil.

The right to remain silent was asserted at grand jury or congressional hearings in the 1950s, when witnesses testifying before the House Committee on Un-American Activities or the Senate Internal Security Subcommittee claimed the right in response to questions concerning their alleged membership in the Communist Party. Under the Red Scare hysteria at the time of McCarthyism, witnesses who refused to answer the questions were described by McCarthy as "fifth amendment communists". They lost jobs or positions in unions and other political organizations, and suffered other repercussions after "taking the Fifth".

Senator Joseph McCarthy (R-WI) routinely asked witnesses, "Are you now, or have you ever been, a member of the Communist Party?" while he was chairman of the Senate Government Operations Committee Permanent Subcommittee on Investigations. Admitting to a previous Communist Party membership was not sufficient. Witnesses were also required to "name names", i.e. implicate others they knew to be Communists or who had been Communists in the past. Academy Award winning director Elia Kazan testified before the House Committee on Un-American Activities that he had belonged to the Communist Party briefly in his youth. He also "named names", which incurred enmity of many in Hollywood. Other entertainers such as Zero Mostel found themselves on a Hollywood blacklist after taking the Fifth, and were unable to find work for a while in show business.

The amendment has also been used by defendants and witnesses in criminal cases involving the American Mafia.

=== Statements made to non-governmental entities ===
The privilege against self-incrimination does not protect an individual from being suspended from membership in a non-governmental, self-regulatory organization (SRO), such as the New York Stock Exchange (NYSE), where the individual refuses to answer questions posed by the SRO. An SRO itself is not a law enforcement entity or court of law, and cannot send a person to jail. SROs, such as the NYSE and the National Association of Securities Dealers (NASD), are generally not considered to be state actors. See United States v. Solomon, D. L. Cromwell Invs., Inc. v. NASD Regulation, Inc., and Marchiano v. NASD. SROs also lack subpoena powers. They rely heavily on requiring testimony from individuals by wielding the threat of loss of membership or a bar from the industry (permanent, if decided by the NASD) when the individual asserts the Fifth Amendment privilege against compelled self-incrimination. If a person chooses to provide statements in testimony to the SRO, the SRO may provide information about those statements to law enforcement agencies, who may then use the statements in a prosecution of the individual.

=== Custodial interrogation ===
The Fifth Amendment limits the use of evidence obtained illegally by law enforcement officers. Originally, at common law, even a confession obtained by torture was admissible. However, by the eighteenth century, common law in England provided that coerced confessions were inadmissible. The common law rule was incorporated into American law by the courts. The Supreme Court has repeatedly overruled convictions based on such confessions, in cases such as Brown v. Mississippi, 297 U.S. 278 (1936).

Law enforcement responded by switching to more subtle techniques, but the courts held that such techniques, even if they do not involve physical torture, may render a confession involuntary and inadmissible. In Chambers v. Florida (1940) the Court held a confession obtained after five days of prolonged questioning, during which time the defendant was held incommunicado, to be coerced. In Ashcraft v. Tennessee (1944), the suspect had been interrogated continuously for thirty-six hours under electric lights. In Haynes v. Washington, the Court held that an "unfair and inherently coercive context" including a prolonged interrogation rendered a confession inadmissible.

Miranda v. Arizona (1966) was a landmark case involving confessions. Ernesto Miranda had signed a statement confessing to the crime, but the Supreme Court held that the confession was inadmissible because the defendant had not been advised of his rights. The Court held "the prosecution may not use statements ... stemming from custodial interrogation of the defendant unless it demonstrates the use of procedural safeguards effective to secure the privilege against self-incrimination." Custodial interrogation is initiated by law enforcement after a person has been taken into custody or otherwise deprived of his freedom of movement before being questioned as to the specifics of the crime. As for the procedural safeguards to be employed, unless other fully effective means are devised to inform accused persons of their right of silence and to assure a continuous opportunity to exercise it, the following measures are required. Before any questioning, the person must be warned that he has a right to remain silent, that any statement he does make may be used as evidence against him, and that he has a right to the presence of an attorney, either retained or appointed.

The warning Chief Justice Earl Warren referred to is now called the Miranda warning, and it is customarily delivered by the police to an individual before questioning. Miranda has been clarified by several further Supreme Court rulings. For the warning to be necessary, the questioning must be conducted under "custodial" circumstances. A person detained in jail or under arrest is, of course, deemed to be in police custody. Alternatively, a person who is under the reasonable belief that he may not freely leave from the restraint of law enforcement is also deemed to be in "custody". That determination of "reasonableness" is based on a totality of the objective circumstances. A mere presence at a police station may not be sufficient, but neither is such a presence required. Traffic stops are not deemed custodial. The Court has ruled that age can be an objective factor. In Yarborough v. Alvarado (2004), the Court held that "a state-court decision that failed to mention a 17-year-old's age as part of the Miranda custody analysis was not objectively unreasonable". In her concurring opinion Justice O'Connor wrote that a suspect's age may indeed "be relevant to the 'custody' inquiry"; the Court did not find it relevant in the specific case of Alvarado. The Court affirmed that age could be a relevant and objective factor in J.D.B. v. North Carolina where they ruled that "so long as the child's age was known to the officer at the time of police questioning, or would have been objectively apparent to a reasonable officer, its inclusion in the custody analysis is consistent with the objective nature of that test".

The questioning does not have to be explicit to trigger Miranda rights. For example, two police officers engaging in a conversation designed to elicit an incriminating statement from a suspect would constitute questioning. A person may choose to waive his Miranda rights, but the prosecution has the burden of showing that such a waiver was actually made.

A confession not preceded by a Miranda warning where one was necessary cannot be admitted as evidence against the confessing party in a judicial proceeding. The Supreme Court, however, has held that if a defendant voluntarily testifies at the trial that he did not commit the crime, his confession may be introduced to challenge his credibility, to "impeach" the witness, even if it had been obtained without the warning.

In Hiibel v. Sixth Judicial District Court of Nevada (2004), the Supreme Court ruled 5–4 that being required to identify oneself to police under states' stop and identify statutes is not an unreasonable search or seizure, and is not necessarily self-incrimination.

==== Explicit invocation ====
In June 2010, the Supreme Court ruled in Berghuis v. Thompkins that a criminal suspect must now invoke the right to remain silent unambiguously. Unless and until the suspect actually states that he is relying on that right, police may continue to interact with (or question) him, and any voluntary statement he makes can be used in court. The mere act of remaining silent is, on its own, insufficient to imply the suspect has invoked those rights. Furthermore, a voluntary reply, even after lengthy silence, can be construed as implying a waiver. The new rule will defer to police in cases where the suspect fails to assert the right to remain silent. This standard was extended in Salinas v. Texas in 2013 to cases where individuals not in custody who volunteer to answer officers' questions and who are not told their Miranda rights. The Court stated that there was no "ritualistic formula" necessary to assert this right, but that a person could not do so "by simply standing mute".

=== Production of documents ===
Under the Act of Production Doctrine, the act of an individual in producing documents or materials (e.g., in response to a subpoena) may have a "testimonial aspect" for purposes of the individual's right to assert the Fifth Amendment right against self-incrimination to the extent that the individual's act of production provides information not already in the hands of law enforcement personnel about the (1) existence; (2) custody; or (3) authenticity, of the documents or materials produced. See United States v. Hubbell. In Boyd v. United States, the U.S. Supreme Court stated that "It is equivalent to a compulsory production of papers to make the nonproduction of them a confession of the allegations which it is pretended they will prove".

==== By corporations ====
Corporations may also be compelled to maintain and turn over records; the Supreme Court has held that the Fifth Amendment protections against self-incrimination extend only to "natural persons". The Court has also held that a corporation's custodian of records can be forced to produce corporate documents even if the act of production would incriminate him personally. The only limitation on this rule is that the jury cannot be told that the custodian personally produced those documents in any subsequent prosecution of him, but the jury is still allowed to draw adverse inferences from the content of the documents combined with the position of the custodian in the corporation.

=== Refusal to testify in a criminal case ===
In Griffin v. California (1965), the Supreme Court ruled that a prosecutor may not ask the jury to draw an inference of guilt from a defendant's refusal to testify in his own defense. The Court overturned a provision of the California state constitution that explicitly granted such power to prosecutors, finding it unconstitutional.

=== Refusal to testify in a civil case ===
While defendants are entitled to assert the right against compelled self-incrimination in a civil court case, there are consequences to the assertion of the right in such an action.

The Supreme Court has held that "the Fifth Amendment does not forbid adverse inferences against parties to civil actions when they refuse to testify in response to probative evidence offered against them." Baxter v. Palmigiano, "[A]s Mr. Justice Brandeis declared, speaking for a unanimous court in the Tod case, 'Silence is often evidence of the most persuasive character.'" "'Failure to contest an assertion ... is considered evidence of acquiescence ... if it would have been natural under the circumstances to object to the assertion in question.'"

In Baxter, the state was entitled to an adverse inference against Palmigiano because of the evidence against him and his assertion of the Fifth Amendment right.

Some civil cases are considered "criminal cases" for the purposes of the Fifth Amendment. In Boyd v. United States, the U.S. Supreme Court stated that "A proceeding to forfeit a person's goods for an offence against the laws, though civil in form, and whether in rem or in personam, is a "criminal case" within the meaning of that part of the Fifth Amendment which declares that no person "shall be compelled, in any criminal case, to be a witness against himself."

In United States v. Lileikis, the court ruled that Aleksandras Lileikis was not entitled to Fifth Amendment protections in a civil denaturalization case even though he faced criminal prosecution in Lithuania, the country that he would be deported to if denaturalized.

=== Federal income tax ===
In some cases, individuals may be legally required to file reports that call for information that may be used against them in criminal cases. In United States v. Sullivan, the United States Supreme Court ruled that a taxpayer could not invoke the Fifth Amendment's protections as the basis for refusing to file a required federal income tax return. The Court stated: "If the form of return provided called for answers that the defendant was protected from making[,] he could have raised the objection in the return, but could not on that account refuse to make any return at all. We are not called on to decide what, if anything, he might have withheld."

In Garner v. United States, the defendant was convicted of crimes involving a conspiracy to "fix" sporting contests and to transmit illegal bets. During the trial the prosecutor introduced, as evidence, the taxpayer's federal income tax returns for various years. In one return the taxpayer had shown his occupation to be "professional gambler". In various returns the taxpayer had reported income from "gambling" or "wagering". The prosecution used this to help contradict the taxpayer's argument that his involvement was innocent. The taxpayer tried unsuccessfully to keep the prosecutor from introducing the tax returns as evidence, arguing that since the taxpayer was legally required to report the illegal income on the returns, he was being compelled to be a witness against himself. The Supreme Court agreed that he was legally required to report the illegal income on the returns, but ruled that the right against self-incrimination still did not apply. The Court stated that "if a witness under compulsion to testify makes disclosures instead of claiming the right, the Government has not 'compelled' him to incriminate himself."

Sullivan and Garner are viewed as standing, in tandem, for the proposition that on a required federal income tax return a taxpayer would probably have to report the amount of the illegal income, but might validly claim the right by labeling the item "Fifth Amendment" (instead of "illegal gambling income", "illegal drug sales", etc.) The United States Court of Appeals for the Eleventh Circuit has stated: "Although the source of income might be privileged, the amount must be reported." The U.S. Court of Appeals for the Fifth Circuit has stated: "... the amount of a taxpayer's income is not privileged even though the source of income may be, and Fifth Amendment rights can be exercised in compliance with the tax laws 'by simply listing his alleged ill-gotten gains in the space provided for "miscellaneous" income on his tax form'." In another case, the Court of Appeals for the Fifth Circuit stated: "While the source of some of [the defendant] Johnson's income may have been privileged, assuming that the jury believed his uncorroborated testimony that he had illegal dealings in gold in 1970 and 1971, the amount of his income was not privileged and he was required to pay taxes on it." In 1979, the U.S. Court of Appeals for the Tenth Circuit stated: "A careful reading of Sullivan and Garner, therefore, is that the self-incrimination privilege can be employed to protect the taxpayer from revealing the information as to an illegal source of income, but does not protect him from disclosing the amount of his income."

=== Grants of immunity ===
If the government gives an individual immunity, then that individual may be compelled to testify. Immunity may be "transactional immunity" or "use immunity"; in the former, the witness is immune from prosecution for offenses related to the testimony; in the latter, the witness may be prosecuted, but his testimony may not be used against him. In Kastigar v. United States, the Supreme Court held that the government need only grant use immunity to compel testimony. The use immunity, however, must extend not only to the testimony made by the witness, but also to all evidence derived therefrom. This scenario most commonly arises in cases related to organized crime.

=== Record keeping ===
A statutorily required record-keeping system may go too far such that it implicates a record-keeper's right against self-incrimination. A three part test laid out by Albertson v. Subversive Activities Control Board, is used to determine this: 1. the law targets a highly selective group inherently suspect of criminal activities; 2. the activities sought to be regulated are already permeated with criminal statutes as opposed to essentially being non-criminal and largely regulatory; and 3. the disclosure compelled creates a likelihood of prosecution and is used against the record-keeper. In this case, the Supreme Court struck down an order by the Subversive Activities Control Board requiring members of the Communist Party to register with the government and upheld an assertion of the privilege against self-incrimination, on the grounds that statute under which the order had been issued was "directed at a highly selective group inherently suspect of criminal activities."

In Leary v. United States, the court struck down the Marijuana Tax Act because its record keeping statute required self-incrimination.

In Haynes v. United States, the Supreme Court ruled that a provision of the National Firearms Act that required registration of guns made or acquired in violation of the act constituted a form of self-incrimination and was therefore unconstitutional.

=== Combinations and passwords ===
While no such case has yet arisen, the Supreme Court has indicated that a respondent cannot be compelled to turn over "the contents of his own mind", e.g. the password to a bank account.

Lower courts have given conflicting decisions on whether forced disclosure of computer passwords is a violation of the Fifth Amendment.

In In re Boucher (2009), the US District Court of Vermont ruled that the Fifth Amendment might protect a defendant from having to reveal an encryption password, or even the existence of one, if the production of that password could be deemed a self-incriminating "act" under the Fifth Amendment. In Boucher, production of the unencrypted drive was deemed not to be a self-incriminating act, as the government already had sufficient evidence to tie the encrypted data to the defendant.

In January 2012 a federal judge in Denver ruled that a bank-fraud suspect was required to give an unencrypted copy of a laptop hard drive to prosecutors. However, in February 2012 the Eleventh Circuit ruled otherwise—finding that requiring a defendant to produce an encrypted drive's password would violate the Constitution, becoming the first federal circuit court to rule on the issue. In April 2013, a District Court magistrate judge in Wisconsin refused to compel a suspect to provide the encryption password to his hard drive after FBI agents had unsuccessfully spent months trying to decrypt the data. The Oregon Supreme Court ruled that unlocking a phone with a passcode is testimonial under Article I, section 12 of the state constitution, thus compelling it would be unconstitutional. Its ruling implied, however, that unlocking via biometrics may be allowed.

=== Employer coercion ===
As a condition of employment, workers may be required to answer their employer's narrowly defined questions regarding conduct on the job. If an employee invokes the Garrity rule (sometimes called the Garrity Warning or Garrity Rights) before answering the questions, then the answers cannot be used in criminal prosecution of the employee. This principle was developed in Garrity v. New Jersey, 385 U.S. 493 (1967). The rule is most commonly applied to public employees such as police officers.

== Due process ==
The Fifth and Fourteenth Amendments to the United States Constitution each deals with the administration of justice and thus the due process clause acts as a safeguard from arbitrary denial of life, liberty, or property by the government outside the sanction of law. The Supreme Court has interpreted the due process clauses to provide four protections: procedural due process (in civil and criminal proceedings), substantive due process, a prohibition against vague laws, and as the vehicle for the incorporation of the Bill of Rights.

== Takings Clause ==
=== Eminent domain ===
The "Takings Clause", the last clause of the Fifth Amendment, limits the power of eminent domain by requiring "just compensation" be paid if private property is taken for public use. It was the only clause in the Bill of Rights drafted solely by James Madison and not previously recommended to him by other constitutional delegates or a state ratifying convention. It was likely adopted in response to the Continental Army's practice of seizing military supplies, without compensation, during the Revolutionary War.

The Takings Clause originally applied only to the federal government resources and federal government, but the U.S. Supreme Court ruled in the 1897 case Chicago, B. & Q. Railroad Co. v. Chicago that the Fourteenth Amendment incidentally extended the effects of that provision to the states. During the 19th Century, the power of eminent domain could only be exercised, generally, if the property condemned would literally be used by the public, such as for a road, a ferry, a mill, or a government building. Over time, however, the federal courts adopted a more expansive interpretation of "public use" as meaning any "public benefit," and the courts have deferred to the legislature's determination regarding what constitutes a "public use."

Pennsylvania Coal Co. v. Mahon overturned a Pennsylvania statute prohibiting coal mining that could undermine a home's foundation for takings of a corporation's property without compensation. The owner of the property that is taken by the government must be justly compensated. When determining the amount that must be paid, the government does not need to take into account any speculative schemes in which the owner claims the property was intended to be used. Normally, the fair market value of the property determines "just compensation". If the property is taken before the payment is made, interest accrues (though the courts have refrained from using the term "interest").

Property under the Fifth Amendment includes contractual rights stemming from contracts between the United States, a U.S. state or any of its subdivisions and the other contract partner(s), because contractual rights are property rights for purposes of the Fifth Amendment. The United States Supreme Court held in Lynch v. United States, 292 U.S. 571 (1934) that valid contracts of the United States are property, and the rights of private individuals arising out of them are protected by the Fifth Amendment. The court said: "The Fifth Amendment commands that property be not taken without making just compensation. Valid contracts are property, whether the obligor be a private individual, a municipality, a state, or the United States. Rights against the United States arising out of a contract with it are protected by the Fifth Amendment. United States v. Central Pacific R. Co., 118 U. S. 235, 238; United States v. Northern Pacific Ry. Co., 256 U. S. 51, 64, 67. When the United States enters into contract relations, its rights and duties therein are governed generally by the law applicable to contracts between private individuals."

Some legal scholars have also criticized the Supreme Court's recent trends toward defining property interests with reference to generalized property law rather than state-specific law, which may reduce protections under the Takings Clause by making it harder for property owners to identify compensable interests.

The federal courts have not restrained state and local governments from seizing privately owned land for private commercial development on behalf of private developers. This was upheld on June 23, 2005, when the Supreme Court issued its opinion in Kelo v. City of New London. This 5–4 decision remains controversial. The majority opinion, by Justice Stevens, found that it was appropriate to defer to the city's decision that the development plan had a public purpose, saying that "the city has carefully formulated a development plan that it believes will provide appreciable benefits to the community, including, but not limited to, new jobs and increased tax revenue." Justice Kennedy's concurring opinion observed that in this particular case the development plan was not "of primary benefit to ... the developer" and that if that was the case the plan might have been impermissible. In the dissent, Justice Sandra Day O'Connor argued that this decision would allow the rich to benefit at the expense of the poor, asserting that "Any property may now be taken for the benefit of another private party, but the fallout from this decision will not be random. The beneficiaries are likely to be those citizens with disproportionate influence and power in the political process, including large corporations and development firms." She argued that the decision eliminates "any distinction between private and public use of property—and thereby effectively delete[s] the words 'for public use' from the Takings Clause of the Fifth Amendment". A number of states, in response to Kelo, have passed laws and/or state constitutional amendments which make it more difficult for state governments to seize private land. Takings that are not "for public use" are not directly covered by the doctrine, however such a taking might violate due process rights under the Fourteenth Amendment, or other applicable law.

Although the Takings Clause applies when the government formally condemns property pursuant to its power of eminent domain, it also applies to any exercise of government authority that has the effect of "taking" a person's property. For instance, if the government builds a dam that floods private property, the owner is entitled to compensation Non-eminent domain takings can either be physical or regulatory. A regulatory taking involves a government authorized intrusion onto private property. For instance, the government might require that landowners allow third parties to install cables on their buildings, or the government might require an employer to host union organizers. These kinds of regulations are treated as "per se" takings requiring compensation. If a government regulation only restricts the way the property owners use their property, such as by limiting the height of buildings that can be constructed, such regulation will only be treated as a taking if it goes "too far."

=== Taxation ===
Taxation (also authorized by other parts of the Constitution) is considered constitutional despite a potential conflict with the Takings Clause. Some scholars argue the distinction between taxing and taking is a matter of degree.

=== Just compensation ===
The last two words of the amendment promise "just compensation" for takings by the government. In United States v. 50 Acres of Land (1984), the Supreme Court wrote that "The Court has repeatedly held that just compensation normally is to be measured by "the market value of the property at the time of the taking contemporaneously paid in money." Olson v. United States, 292 U.S. 246 (1934). That said, "fair market value" is only a presumption. The Supreme Court has "refused to make a fetish even of market value, since it may not be the best measure of value in some cases." United States v. Cors, 337 U.S. 325, 332 (1949). Courts will deviate from fair market value when it is "too difficult to find, or when its application would result in manifest injustice to owner or public". United States v. Commodities Trading Corp., 339 U.S. 121, 123 (1950).

=== Civil asset forfeiture ===
Civil asset forfeiture or occasionally civil seizure, is a controversial legal process in which law enforcement officers take assets from persons suspected of involvement with crime or illegal activity without necessarily charging the owners with wrongdoing. While civil procedure, as opposed to criminal procedure, generally involves a dispute between two private citizens, civil forfeiture involves a dispute between law enforcement and property such as a pile of cash or a house or a boat, such that the thing is suspected of being involved in a crime. To get back the seized property, owners must prove it was not involved in criminal activity. Sometimes it can mean a threat to seize property as well as the act of seizure itself.

In civil forfeiture, assets are seized by police based on a suspicion of wrongdoing, and without having to charge a person with specific wrongdoing, with the case being between police and the thing itself, sometimes referred to by the Latin term in rem, meaning "against the property"; the property itself is the defendant and no criminal charge against the owner is needed. If property is seized in a civil forfeiture, it is "up to the owner to prove that his cash is clean" and the court can weigh a defendant's use of their Fifth Amendment right to remain silent in their decision. In civil forfeiture, the test in most cases is whether police feel there is a preponderance of the evidence suggesting wrongdoing; in criminal forfeiture, the test is whether police feel the evidence is beyond a reasonable doubt, which is a tougher test to meet. In contrast, criminal forfeiture is a legal action brought as "part of the criminal prosecution of a defendant", described by the Latin term in personam, meaning "against the person", and happens when government indicts or charges the property which is either used in connection with a crime, or derived from a crime, that is suspected of being committed by the defendant; the seized assets are temporarily held and become government property officially after an accused person has been convicted by a court of law; if the person is found to be not guilty, the seized property must be returned.

Normally both civil and criminal forfeitures require involvement by the judiciary because; however, there is a variant of civil forfeiture called administrative forfeiture which is essentially a civil forfeiture which does not require involvement by the judiciary, which derives its powers from the Tariff Act of 1930, and empowers police to seize banned imported merchandise, as well as things used to import or transport or store a controlled substance, money, or other property which is less than $500,000 value.

== See also ==
- United States constitutional criminal procedure
