= Miranda warning =

Notification given by U.S. police to criminal suspects on their rights while in custody

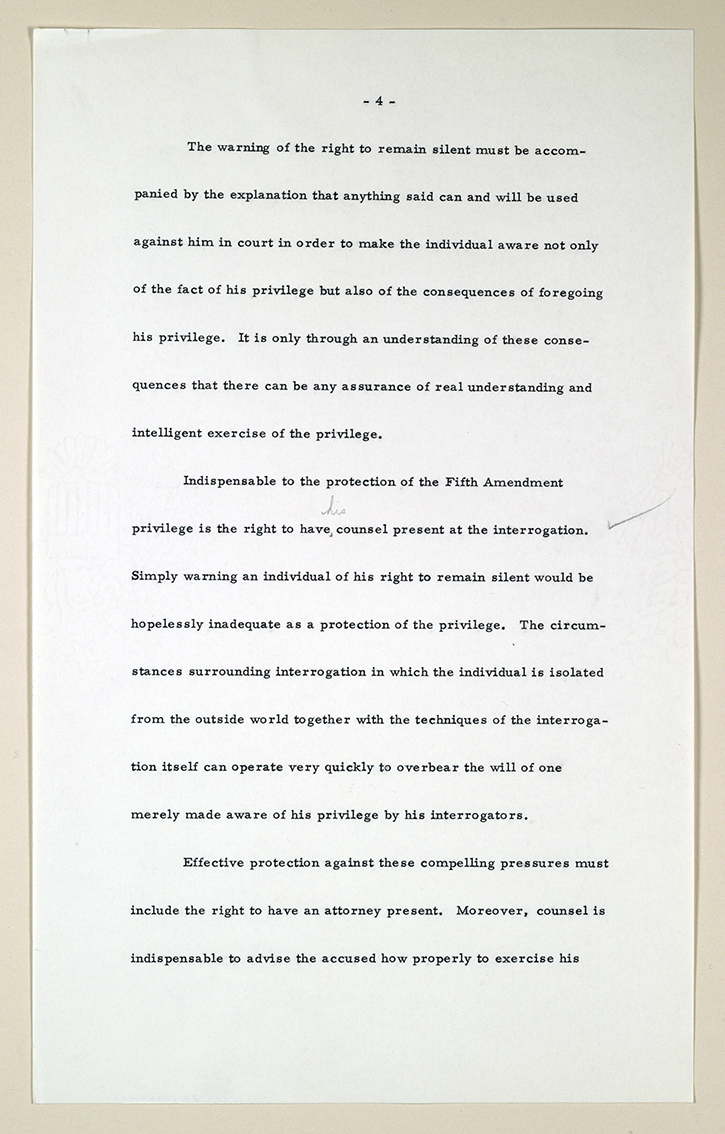
Page of the manuscript written by Chief Justice Earl Warren regarding the Miranda v. Arizona decision. This page established the basic requirements of the "Miranda warning".

In the United States, the Miranda warning is a type of notification customarily given by police to criminal suspects in police custody (or in a custodial interrogation) advising them of their right to silence and, in effect, protection from self-incrimination; that is, their right to refuse to answer questions or provide information to law enforcement or other officials. Named for the U.S. Supreme Court's 1966 decision Miranda v. Arizona, these rights are often referred to as Miranda rights. The purpose of such notification is to preserve the admissibility of their statements made during custodial interrogation in later criminal proceedings. The idea came from law professor Yale Kamisar, who subsequently was dubbed "the father of Miranda".

The language used in Miranda warnings derives from the Supreme Court's opinion in its Miranda decision. However, the specific language used in the warnings varies between jurisdictions, and the warning is deemed adequate as long as the defendant's rights are properly disclosed such that any waiver of those rights by the defendant is knowing, voluntary, and intelligent. For example, the warning may be phrased as follows:

You have the right to remain silent. Anything you say can and will be used against you in a court of law. You have the right to talk to a lawyer for advice before we ask you any questions. You have the right to have a lawyer with you during questioning. If you cannot afford a lawyer, one will be appointed for you before any questioning if you wish. If you decide to answer questions now without a lawyer present, you have the right to stop answering at any time.

The Miranda warning is part of a preventive criminal procedure rule that law enforcement are required to administer to protect an individual who is in custody and subject to direct questioning or its functional equivalent from a violation of their Fifth Amendment right against compelled self-incrimination. In Miranda v. Arizona, the Supreme Court held that the admission of an elicited incriminating statement by a suspect not informed of these rights violates the Fifth Amendment and the Sixth Amendment right to counsel, through the incorporation of these rights into state law. (Note: The 2004 United States Supreme Court ruling Hiibel v. Sixth Judicial District Court of Nevada upheld state "stop-and-identify" laws, allowing police in those jurisdictions engaging in a Terry stop to require biographical information such as name and address, without arresting suspects or providing them Miranda warnings.) Thus, if law enforcement officials decline to offer a Miranda warning to an individual in their custody, they may interrogate that person and act upon the knowledge gained, but may not ordinarily use that person's statements as evidence against them in a criminal trial.

== Origin and development of Miranda rights ==
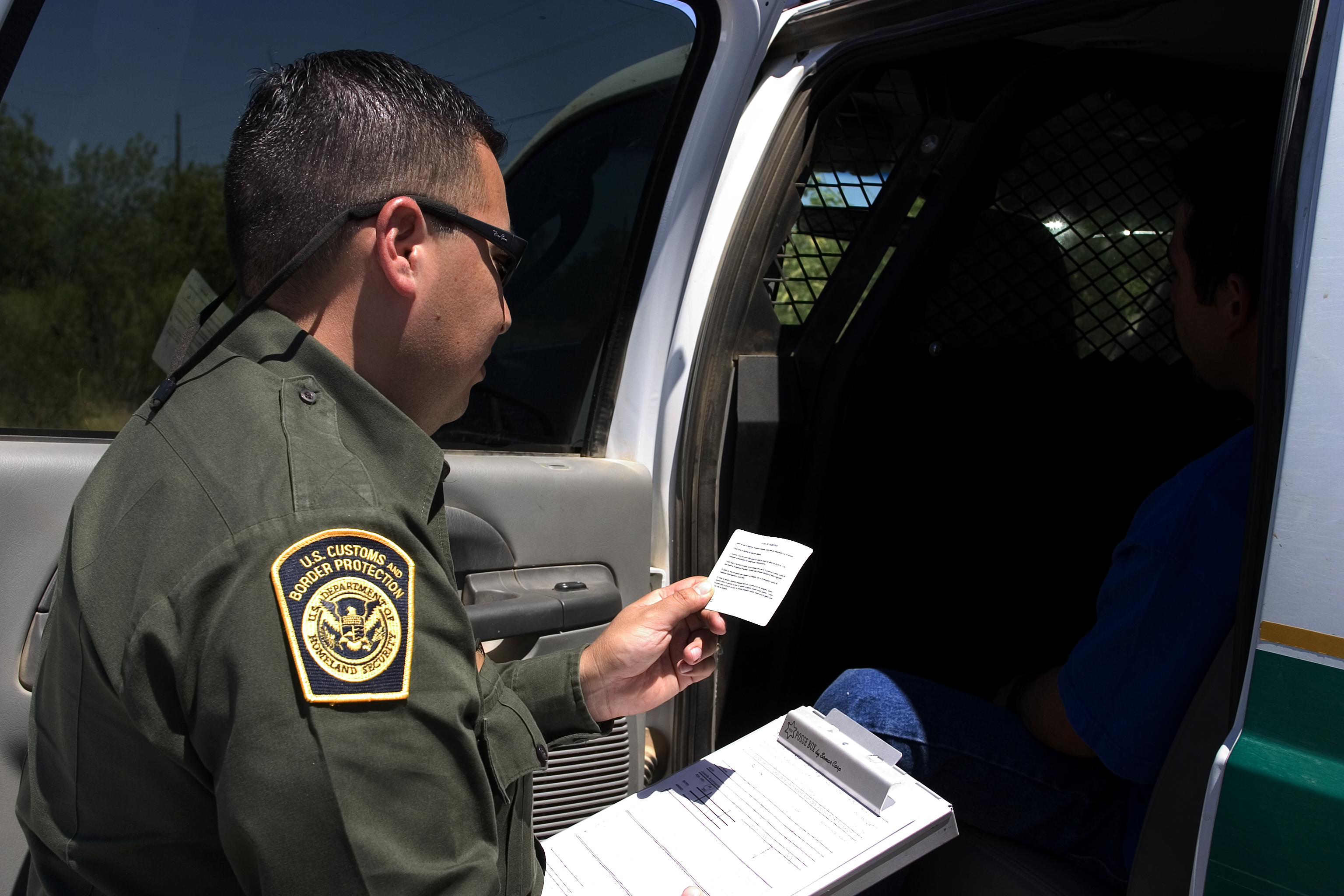
A U.S. Customs and Border Protection (CBP) Border Patrol agent reading the Miranda rights to a suspect

The concept of "Miranda rights" was enshrined in U.S. law following the 1966 Miranda v. Arizona Supreme Court decision, which found that the Fifth and Sixth Amendment rights of Ernesto Arturo Miranda had been violated during his arrest and trial for armed robbery, kidnapping, and rape of an 18-year-old woman.

Miranda was subsequently retried and convicted, based primarily on his estranged ex-partner, who had been tracked down by the original arresting officer via Miranda's own parents, suddenly claiming that Miranda had confessed to her when she had visited him in jail. Miranda's lawyer later confessed that he 'goofed' the case by focusing too much on the constitutional issues (and losing sight of the jury and guilt or innocence).

The circumstances triggering the Miranda safeguards, i.e. Miranda rights, are "custody" and "interrogation". Custody means formal arrest or the deprivation of freedom to an extent associated with formal arrest. Interrogation means explicit questioning or actions that are reasonably likely to elicit an incriminating response. The Supreme Court did not specify the exact wording to use when informing a suspect of their rights. However, the Court did create a set of guidelines that must be followed. The ruling states:

To summarize, we hold that, when an individual is taken into custody or otherwise deprived of his freedom by the authorities in any significant way and is subjected to questioning, the privilege against self-incrimination is jeopardized. Procedural safeguards must be employed to protect the privilege, and unless other fully effective means are adopted to notify the person of his right of silence and to assure that the exercise of the right will be scrupulously honored, the following measures are required. He must be warned prior to any questioning that he has the right to remain silent, that anything he says can be used against him in a court of law, that he has the right to the presence of an attorney, and that, if he cannot afford an attorney one will be appointed for him prior to any questioning if he so desires. Opportunity to exercise these rights must be afforded to him throughout the interrogation. After such warnings have been given, and such opportunity afforded him, the individual may knowingly and intelligently waive these rights and agree to answer questions or make a statement. But unless and until such warnings and waiver are demonstrated by the prosecution at trial, no evidence obtained as a result of interrogation can be used against him.

From Miranda rights, American English developed the verb Mirandize, meaning "read the Miranda rights to".

In Berkemer v. McCarty (1984), the Supreme Court decided that a person subjected to custodial interrogation is entitled to the benefit of the procedural safeguards enunciated in Miranda, regardless of the nature or severity of the offense of which they are suspected or for which they were arrested.

Notably, the Miranda rights need not be read in any particular order, and they need not precisely match the language of the Miranda case as long as they are adequately and fully conveyed (California v. Prysock, 453 U.S. 355 (1981)).

In Berghuis v. Thompkins (2010), the Supreme Court held that unless a suspect expressly states that they are invoking this right, subsequent voluntary statements made to an officer can be used against them in court, and police can continue to interact with (or question) the alleged criminal.

In Vega v. Tekoh (2022), the Supreme Court held that police may not be sued for failing to administer Miranda warnings, and that the remedy for such a failure is the exclusion of the acquired statements at trial.

== The warnings ==
Every U.S. jurisdiction has its own regulations regarding what, precisely, must be said to a person arrested or placed in a custodial situation. The typical warning states:

- You have the right to remain silent and refuse to answer questions.
- If you give up the right to remain silent, anything you say can and will be used against you in a court of law.
- You have the right to consult an attorney before speaking to the police and to have an attorney present during questioning now or in the future.
- If you cannot afford an attorney, the court will appoint one for you before any questioning if you wish.
- If you decide to answer questions now without an attorney present, you will still have the right to stop answering at any time until you talk to an attorney.
- Knowing and understanding your rights as I have explained them to you, are you willing to answer my questions without an attorney present?

The courts have since ruled that the warning must be "meaningful", so it is usually required that the suspect be asked if they understand their rights. Sometimes, firm answers of "yes" are required. Some departments and jurisdictions require that an officer ask "do you understand?" after every sentence in the warning. An arrestee's silence is not a waiver, but in Berghuis v. Thompkins (2010), the Supreme Court ruled 5–4 that police are allowed to interrogate suspects who have invoked or waived their rights ambiguously, and any statement given during questioning prior to invocation or waiving is admissible as evidence. Evidence has in some cases been ruled inadmissible because of an arrestee's poor knowledge of English and the failure of arresting officers to provide the warning in the arrestee's language.

While the exact language above is not required by Miranda, the police must advise the suspect that:

1. they have the right to remain silent;
2. anything the suspect does say can and may be used against them in a court of law;
3. they have the right to have an attorney present before and during the questioning; and
4. they have the right, if they cannot afford the services of an attorney, to have one appointed, at public expense and without cost to them, to represent them before and during the questioning. (Note: State and Federal courts have consistently rejected challenges to Miranda warnings on grounds that defendant was not advised of additional rights. See, e.g., United States v. Coldwell, 954 F.2d 496(8th Cir. 1992) For example, police are not required to advise a suspect that if he decides to answer questions without an attorney present, he still has the right to stop answering at any time until he talks to an attorney. The Miranda warnings are not part of the arrest procedure. There is no constitutional requirement that the officer advise the defendant of their Miranda rights when they place the defendant under arrest.)

There is no precise language that must be used in advising a suspect of their Miranda rights. The point is that whatever language is used the substance of the rights outlined above must be communicated to the suspect. The suspect may be advised of their rights orally or in writing. Also, officers must make sure the suspect understands what the officer is saying, taking into account potential education levels. It may be necessary to "translate" to the suspect's level of understanding. Courts have ruled this admissible as long as the original waiver is said and the "translation" is recorded either on paper or on tape.

The Supreme Court has resisted efforts to require officers to more fully advise suspects of their rights. For example, the police are not required to advise the suspect that they can stop the interrogation at any time, that the decision to exercise the right cannot be used against the suspect, or that they have a right to talk to a lawyer before being asked any questions. Nor have the courts required to explain the rights. For example, the standard Miranda right to counsel states You have a right to have an attorney present during the questioning. Police are not required to explain that this right is not merely a right to have a lawyer present while the suspect is being questioned. The right to counsel includes:

- the right to talk to a lawyer before deciding whether to talk to police,
- if the defendant decides to talk to the police, the right to consult with a lawyer before being interrogated,
- the right to answer police only through an attorney.

=== Circumstances triggering the Miranda requisites ===
The circumstances triggering the Miranda safeguards, i.e. Miranda warnings, are "custody" and "interrogation". Custody means formal arrest or the deprivation of freedom to an extent associated with formal arrest. Interrogation means explicit questioning or actions that are reasonably likely to elicit an incriminating response. Suspects in "custody" who are about to be interrogated must be properly advised of their Miranda rights—namely, the Fifth Amendment right against compelled self incrimination (and, in furtherance of this right, the right to counsel while in custody). The Sixth Amendment right to counsel means that the suspect has the right to consult with an attorney before questioning begins and have an attorney present during the interrogation. The Fifth Amendment right against compelled self incrimination is the right to remain silent—the right to refuse to answer questions or to otherwise communicate information.

The duty to warn only arises when police officers conduct custodial interrogations. The Constitution does not require that a defendant be advised of the Miranda rights as part of the arrest procedure, or once an officer has probable cause to arrest, or if the defendant has become a suspect of the focus of an investigation. Custody and interrogation are the events that trigger the duty to warn.

=== Use in various U.S. state jurisdictions ===
Some jurisdictions provide the right of a juvenile to remain silent if their parent or guardian is not present. Some departments in New Jersey, Nevada, Oklahoma, and Alaska modify the "providing an attorney" clause as follows:

We have no way of giving you a lawyer, but one will be appointed for you, if you wish, if and when you go to court.

Even though this sentence may be somewhat ambiguous to some laypersons, who can, and who have actually interpreted it as meaning that they will not get a lawyer until they confess and are arraigned in court, the U.S. Supreme Court has approved of it as an accurate description of the procedure in those states.

In Texas, New Mexico, Arizona, and California—the four states that border Mexico—suspects who are not United States citizens are given an additional warning:

If you are not a United States citizen, you may contact your country's consulate prior to any questioning.

After issuance of Miranda warnings, the police may ask waiver questions. Common waiver questions, which may be included on a written warning card or document, are,

Question 1: Do you understand each of these rights I have explained to you? Question 2: Having these rights in mind, do you wish to talk to us now?

An affirmative answer to both of the above questions waives the rights. If the suspect responds "no" to the first question, the officer is required to re-read the Miranda warning, while saying "no" to the second question invokes the right at that moment; in either case the interviewing officer or officers cannot question the suspect until the rights are waived.

Generally, when defendants invoke their Fifth Amendment right against self-incrimination and refuse to testify or submit to cross-examination at trial, the prosecutor cannot indirectly punish them for the exercise of a constitutional right by commenting on their silence and insinuating that it is an implicit admission of guilt. Since Miranda rights are simply a judicial gloss upon the Fifth Amendment which protects against coercive interrogations, the same rule also prevents prosecutors from commenting about the post-arrest silence of suspects who invoke their Miranda rights immediately after arrest. However, neither the Fifth Amendment nor Miranda extend to pre-arrest silence, which means that if a defendant takes the witness stand at trial (meaning they just waived their Fifth Amendment right to remain silent), the prosecutor can attack their credibility with their pre-arrest silence (based on their failure to immediately turn themself in and confess to the things they voluntarily testified about at trial).

Under the Uniform Code of Military Justice, Article 31 provides for the right against compelled self-incrimination. Interrogation subjects under Army jurisdiction must first be given Department of the Army Form 3881, which informs them of the charges and their rights, and the subjects must sign the form. The United States Navy and United States Marine Corps require that all arrested personnel be read the "rights of the accused" and must sign a form waiving those rights if they so desire; a verbal waiver is not sufficient.

It is unclear whether a Miranda warning—if spoken or in writing—could be appropriately given to disabled persons. For example, "the right to remain silent" means little to a deaf individual and the word "constitutional" may not be understood by people with only an elementary education. In one case, a deaf murder suspect was kept at a therapy station until he was able to understand the meaning of the Miranda warning and other judicial proceedings.

== The six rules ==
The Miranda rule applies to the use of testimonial evidence in criminal proceedings that is the product of custodial police interrogation. The Miranda right to counsel and right to remain silent are derived from the self-incrimination clause of the Fifth Amendment. (Note: The Miranda rule is not an element of a valid arrest. The Fifth Amendment does not require an officer to give an arrestee his Miranda rights as part of the arrest procedure. The Miranda rights are triggered by custody and interrogation. At the time the Supreme Court decided Miranda the Fifth Amendment had already been applied to the states in Malloy v. Hogan, 378 U.S. 1 (1964).) Therefore, for the Miranda to apply, six requirements must be fulfilled:

1. Evidence must have been gathered.
If the suspect did not make a statement during the interrogation the fact that he was not advised of his Miranda rights is of no importance. (Note: Post-warning silence cannot be used as evidence of guilt or to impeach the defendant's trial testimony.) Nor can the state offer evidence that the defendant asserted his rights—that he refused to talk.
2. The evidence must be testimonial.
Miranda applies only to "testimonial" evidence as that term is defined under the Fifth Amendment. For purposes of the Fifth Amendment, testimonial statements mean communications that explicitly or implicitly relate a factual assertion [an assertion of fact or belief] or disclose information. The Miranda rule does not prohibit compelling a person to engage in non-assertive conduct that is incriminating or may produce incriminating evidence. Thus, requiring a suspect to participate in identification procedures such as giving handwriting or voice exemplars, fingerprints, DNA samples, hair samples, and dental impressions is not within the Miranda rule. Such physical or real evidence is non-testimonial and not protected by the Fifth Amendment self-incrimination clause. On the other hand, certain non-verbal conduct may be testimonial. For example, if the suspect nodded their head up and down in response to the question "did you kill the victim", the conduct is testimonial; it is the same as saying "yes I did", and Miranda would apply.
3. The evidence must have been obtained while the suspect was in custody.
The evidence must have been obtained while the suspect was in custody. This limitation follows from the fact that Miranda's purpose is to protect suspects from the compulsion inherent in the police-dominated atmosphere attendant to arrest. Custody means either that the suspect was under arrest or that his freedom of movement was restrained to an extent "associated with a formal arrest". (Note: Some courts phrased the requirement as the defendant did not believe that he was "free to leave". This standard is comparable to the detention standard for purposes of the fourth amendment—not the functional arrest standard for purposes of the fifth amendment.) A formal arrest occurs when an officer, with the intent to make an arrest, takes a person into custody by the use of physical force or the person submits to the control of an officer who has indicated his intention to arrest the person. Telling a person he is "under arrest" is sufficient to satisfy this requirement even though the person may not be otherwise physically restrained. Absent a formal arrest, the issue is whether a reasonable person in the suspect's position would have believed that he was under "full custodial" arrest. (Note: In deciding whether a person is in "constructive custody" the courts use a totality of the circumstances test. Factors frequently examined include: 1. the location of the interrogation; 2. the force used to stop or detain the suspect; 3. the number officer and police vehicles involved; 4. whether the officers were in uniform; 5. whether the officers were visibly armed; 6. the tone of officer's voice; 7. whether the suspect was told they were free to leave; 8. the length of the detention and/or interrogation; 9. whether the suspect was confronted with incriminating evidence and; 10. whether the accused was the focus of the investigation.) Applying this objective test, the Court has held Miranda does not apply to roadside questioning of a stopped motorist or to questioning of a person briefly detained on the street—a Terry stop. Even though neither the motorist nor the pedestrian is free to leave, this interference with the freedom of action is not considered actual arrest or its functional equivalent for purposes of the Fifth Amendment. The court has similarly held that a person who voluntarily comes to the police station for purposes of questioning is not in custody and thus not entitled to Miranda warnings particularly when the police advise the suspect that he is not under arrest and free to leave. (Note: Miranda is not offense or investigation-specific. Therefore, absent a valid waiver, a person in custody cannot be interrogated about the offense they are held in custody for, or any other offense.)
4. The evidence must have been the product of interrogation.
The evidence must have been the product of interrogation. A defendant who seeks to challenge the admissibility of a statement under Miranda must show that the statement was "prompted by police conduct that constituted 'interrogation'". A volunteered statement by a person in custody does not implicate Miranda. In Rhode Island v. Innis, the Supreme Court defined interrogation as express questioning and "any words or actions on the part of the police (other than those normally attendant to arrest and custody) that the police should know are reasonably likely to elicit an incriminating response from the suspect". Thus, a practice that the police "should know is reasonably likely to evoke an incriminating response from a suspect ... amounts to interrogation". For example, confronting the suspect with incriminating evidence may be sufficiently evocative to amount to interrogation because the police are implicitly communicating a question: "How do you explain this?" On the other hand, "unforeseeable results of police words or actions" do not constitute interrogation. Under this definition, routine statements made during the administration of sobriety tests would not implicate Miranda. For example, a police officer arrests a person for impaired driving and takes him to the police station to administer an intoxilyzer test. While at the station the officer also asks the defendant to perform certain psycho-physical tests such as the walk and turn, one leg stand or finger to nose test. It is standard practice to instruct the arrestee on how to perform the test and to demonstrate the test. (The police will not tell the person that they have the right to refuse to perform the test, and the refusal cannot be used in evidence against them, nor can they be in any way punished for refusing to perform it, same as the police will not tell someone that they may refuse to perform a roadside sobriety test without penalty). An incriminating statement made by an arrestee during the instruction, "I couldn't do that even if I were sober", would not be the product of interrogation. Similarly, incriminating statements made in response to requests for consent to search a vehicle or other property are not considered to be the product of interrogation.
5. The interrogation must have been conducted by state-agents.
To establish a violation of the defendant's Fifth Amendment rights, the defendant must show state action, so the interrogation must have been conducted by state-agents. (Note: According to Kamisar, LaFave & Israel, Basic Criminal Procedure 598 (6th ed. 1986): "[W]hatever may lurk in the heart or mind of the fellow prisoner ..., if it is not 'custodial police interrogation' in the eye of the beholder, then it is not ... interrogation within the meaning of Miranda".) If the interrogation was conducted by a person known by the suspect to be a law enforcement officer the state action requirement is unquestionably met. On the other hand, where a private citizen obtains a statement there is no state action regardless of the custodial circumstances surrounding the statement. A confession obtained through the interrogation by an undercover police officer or a paid informant does not violate Miranda because there is no coercion, no police dominated atmosphere if the suspect does not know that they are being questioned by the police. Private security guards and "private" police present special problems. They are generally not regarded as state-agents. However, an interrogation conducted by a police officer moonlighting as a security guard may well trigger Miranda's safeguards since an officer is considered to be "on duty" at all times.
6. The evidence must be offered by the state during a criminal prosecution. (Note: The Fifth Amendment applies only to compelled statements used in criminal proceedings.)
The evidence is being offered during a criminal proceeding. Under the exclusionary rule, a Miranda-defective statement cannot be used by the prosecution as substantive evidence of guilt. However, the Fifth Amendment exclusionary rule applies only to criminal proceedings. In determining whether a particular proceeding is criminal, the courts look at the punitive nature of the sanctions that could be imposed. Labels are irrelevant. The question is whether the consequences of an outcome adverse to the defendant could be characterized as punishment. Clearly a criminal trial is a criminal proceeding since if convicted the defendant could be fined or imprisoned. However, the possibility of loss of liberty does not make the proceeding criminal in nature. For example, commitment proceedings are not criminal proceedings even though they can result in long confinement because the confinement is considered rehabilitative in nature and not punishment. Similarly, Miranda does not apply directly to probation revocation proceedings because the evidence is not being used as a basis for imposing additional punishment.

=== Application of the prerequisites ===
Assuming that the six requirements are present and Miranda applies, the statement will be subject to suppression unless the prosecution can demonstrate:

- that the suspect was advised of their Miranda rights, and
- that the suspect voluntarily waived those rights or that the circumstances fit an exception to the Miranda rule.

The defendant may also be able to challenge the admissibility of the statement under provisions of state constitutions and state criminal procedure statutes. (Note: Other bases for exclusion include that the confession was the product of an unconstitutional arrest [See Brown v. Illinois, 422 U.S. 590 (1975); Dunaway v. New York, 442 U.S. 200 (1979)], the confession was obtained in violation of the defendant's sixth amendment right to counsel or the confession was involuntary under the due process clause of the fifth and fourteenth amendments.)

Immigrants who are living in the United States without legal documentation are also protected and should receive their Miranda warnings as well when being interrogated or placed under arrest. "Aliens receive constitutional protections when they have come within the territory of the United States and [have] developed substantial connections with this country".

The Fifth Amendment right to counsel, a component of the Miranda Rule, is different from the Sixth Amendment right to counsel. In the context of the law of confessions the Sixth Amendment right to counsel is defined by the Massiah Doctrine.

== Waiver ==
Simply advising the suspect of their rights does not fully comply with the Miranda rule. The suspect must also voluntarily waive their Miranda rights before questioning can proceed. An express waiver is not necessary. However, most law enforcement agencies use written waiver forms. These include questions designed to establish that the suspect expressly waived their rights. Typical waiver questions are

- "Do you understand each of these rights?"

and

- "Understanding each of these rights, do you now wish to speak to the police without a lawyer being present?"

The waiver must be "knowing and intelligent" and it must be "voluntary". These are separate requirements. To satisfy the first requirement the state must show that the suspect generally understood their rights (right to remain silent and right to counsel) and the consequences of forgoing those rights (that anything they said could be used against them in court). To show that the waiver was "voluntary" the state must show that the decision to waive the rights was not the product of police coercion. If police coercion is shown or evident, then the court proceeds to determine the voluntariness of the waiver under the totality of circumstances test focusing on the personal characteristics of the accused and the particulars of the coercive nature of the police conduct. The ultimate issue is whether the coercive police conduct was sufficient to overcome the will of a person under the totality of the circumstances. Courts traditionally focused on two categories of factors in making this determination: (1) the personal characteristics of the suspect and (2) the circumstances attendant to the waiver. However, the Supreme Court significantly altered the voluntariness standard in the case of Colorado v. Connelly. In Connelly, the Court held that "Coercive police activity is a necessary predicate to a finding that a confession is not 'voluntary' within the meaning of the Due Process Clause of the Fourteenth Amendment." The Court has applied this same standard of voluntariness in determining whether a waiver of a suspect's Fifth Amendment Miranda rights was voluntary. Thus, a waiver of Miranda rights is voluntary unless the defendant can show that their decision to waive their rights and speak to the police was the product of police misconduct and coercion that overcame the defendant's free will. After Connelly, the traditional totality of circumstances analysis is not even reached unless the defendant can first show such coercion by the police. Under Connelly, a suspect's decisions need not be the product of rational deliberations. In addition to showing that the waiver was "voluntary", the prosecution must also show that the waiver was "knowing" and "intelligent". Essentially this means the prosecution must prove that the suspect had a basic understanding of their rights and an appreciation of the consequences of forgoing those rights. The focus of the analysis is directly on the personal characteristics of the suspect. If the suspect was under the influence of alcohol or other drugs, or suffered from an emotional or mental condition that substantially impaired their capacity to make rational decisions, the courts may well decide that the suspect's waiver was not knowing and intelligent.

A waiver must also be clear and unequivocal. An equivocal statement is ineffective as a waiver and the police may not proceed with the interrogation until the suspect's intentions are made clear. The requirement that a waiver be unequivocal must be distinguished from situations in which the suspect made an equivocal assertion of their Miranda rights after the interrogation began. Any post-waiver assertion of a suspect's Miranda rights must be clear and unequivocal. Any ambiguity or equivocation will be ineffective. If the suspect's assertion is ambiguous, the interrogating officers are permitted to ask questions to clarify the suspect's intentions, although they are not required to. In other words, if a suspect's assertion is ambiguous, the police may either attempt to clarify the suspect's intentions or they may simply ignore the ineffective assertion and continue with the interrogation. The timing of the assertion is significant. Requesting an attorney prior to arrest is of no consequence because Miranda applies only to custodial interrogations. The police may simply ignore the request and continue with the questioning; however, the suspect is also free to leave.

== Assertion ==
If the defendant asserts his right to remain silent, all interrogation must immediately stop and the police may not resume the interrogation unless they have "scrupulously honored" the defendant's assertion and subsequently obtained a valid waiver before resuming the interrogation. (Note: "Once warnings have been given, the subsequent procedure is clear: if the individual indicates, in any manner, at any time prior to or during questioning, that he wishes to remain silent, the interrogation must cease. At this point, he has shown that he intends to exercise his Fifth Amendment privilege; any statement taken after the person invokes his privilege cannot be other than the product of compulsion, subtle or otherwise. Without the right to cut off questioning, the setting of in-custody." Note the defendant's assertion of their fifth amendment right to silence cannot be used as substantive evidence of guilt, or to impeach the defendant's testimony.) In determining whether the police "scrupulously honored" the assertion the courts apply a totality of the circumstances test. The most important factors are the length of time between termination of the original interrogation and the commencement of the second, and issuing a new set of Miranda warnings before resumption of interrogation.

The consequences of assertion of the right to counsel are stricter. (Note: A request to speak to a third person who is not an attorney does not invoke right to counsel.) The police must immediately cease all interrogation and the police cannot reinitiate interrogation unless counsel is present (merely consulting with counsel is insufficient) or the defendant of his own volition contacts the police. (Note: The Supreme Court held in Maryland v. Shatzer that the protections afforded by the Edwards rule last 14 days.) If the defendant does reinitiate contact, a valid waiver must be obtained before interrogation may resume.

In Berghuis v. Thompkins (2010), the Supreme Court declared in a 5–4 decision that criminal defendants who have been read their Miranda rights (and who have indicated they understand them and have not already waived them), must explicitly state during or before an interrogation begins that they wish to be silent and not speak to police for that protection against self-incrimination to apply. If they speak to police about the incident before invoking the Miranda right to remain silent, or afterwards at any point during the interrogation or detention, the words they speak may be used against them if they have not stated they do not want to speak to police. Those who oppose the ruling contend that the requirement that the defendant must speak to indicate his intention to remain silent further erodes the ability of the defendant to stay completely silent about the case. This opposition must be put in context with the second option offered by the majority opinion, which allowed that the defendant had the option of remaining silent, saying: "Had he wanted to remain silent, he could have said nothing in response or unambiguously invoked his Miranda rights, ending the interrogation." Thus, having been "Mirandized", a suspect may avow explicitly the invocation of these rights, or, alternatively, simply remain silent. Absent the former, "anything [said] can and will be used against [the defendant] in a court of law".

== Exceptions ==
Assuming that the six factors are present, the Miranda rule would apply unless the prosecution can establish that the statement falls within an exception to the Miranda rule. (Note: The statement of the defendant is admissible when offered by the state as substantive evidence of guilt as an admission of a party opponent. This exception or exemption from the hearsay rules is not available to the defendant—the defendant must resort to some other exception if he attempts to offer his own statement into evidence. Further if the defendant is successful in offering his own statement as substantive evidence, then the defendant is the hearsay declarant and the state can impeach the defendant as it would any other witness including the use of potentially devastating evidence of prior convictions.) The three exceptions are:

1. the routine booking question exception
2. the jail house informant exception
3. the public safety exception.

Questions that are routinely asked as part of the administrative process of arrest and custodial commitment are not considered "interrogation" under Miranda because they are not intended or likely to produce incriminating responses. The jail house informant exception applies to situations where the suspect does not know that he is speaking to a state-agent; either a police officer posing as a fellow inmate, a cellmate working as an agent for the state or a family member or friend who has agreed to cooperate with the state in obtaining incriminating information.

=== Public safety exception ===
The "public safety" exception is a limited and case-specific exception, allowing certain unadvised statements (given without Miranda warnings) to be admissible into evidence at trial when they were elicited in circumstances where there was great danger to public safety; thus, the Miranda rule provides some elasticity.

The public safety exception derives from New York v. Quarles (1984), a case in which the Supreme Court considered the admissibility of a statement elicited by a police officer who apprehended a rape suspect who was thought to be carrying a firearm. The arrest took place during the middle of the night in a supermarket that was open to the public but apparently deserted except for the clerks at the checkout counter. When the officer arrested the suspect, he found an empty shoulder holster, handcuffed the suspect, and asked him where the gun was. The suspect nodded in the direction of the gun (which was near some empty cartons) and said, "The gun is over there." The Supreme Court found that such an unadvised statement was admissible in evidence because "[i]n a kaleidoscopic situation such as the one confronting these officers, where spontaneity rather than adherence to a police manual is necessarily the order of the day, the application of the exception we recognize today should not be made to depend on post hoc findings at a suppression hearing concerning the subjective motivation of the police officer." Thus, the jurisprudential rule of Miranda must yield in "a situation where concern for public safety must be paramount to adherence to the literal language of the prophylactic rules enunciated in Miranda'".

Under this exception, to be admissible in the government's direct case at a trial, the questioning must not be "actually compelled by police conduct which overcame his will to resist", and must be focused and limited, involving a situation "in which police officers ask questions reasonably prompted by a concern for the public safety".

In 2010, the Federal Bureau of Investigation encouraged agents to use a broad interpretation of public safety-related questions in terrorism cases, stating that the "magnitude and complexity" of terrorist threats justified "a significantly more extensive public safety interrogation without Miranda warnings than would be permissible in an ordinary criminal case", continuing to list such examples as: "questions about possible impending or coordinated terrorist attacks; the location, nature and threat posed by weapons that might pose an imminent danger to the public; and the identities, locations, and activities or intentions of accomplices who may be plotting additional imminent attacks". A Department of Justice spokesman described this position as not altering the constitutional right, but as clarifying existing flexibility in the rule.

After the Boston Marathon bombing, prosecutors initially argued that Tsarnaev's pre-Miranda statements should be admissible under this exception. However, the exception was not considered by the court because the prosecutors later decided not to use any of that evidence in their case against Tsarnaev.

The New York Court of Appeals upheld the exception in a 2013 murder case, People v Doll, where a man with blood on his clothes was detained and questioned.

The window of opportunity for the exception is small. Once the suspect is formally charged, the Sixth Amendment right to counsel would attach and surreptitious interrogation would be prohibited. The public safety exception applies where circumstances present a clear and present danger to the public's safety and the officers have reason to believe that the suspect has information that can end the emergency.

== Consequences of violation ==
Assuming that a Miranda violation occurred—the six factors are present and no exception applies—the statement will be subject to suppression under the Miranda exclusionary rule. (Note: A common misconception is that a violation of a defendant's constitutional rights warrants dismissal of the charges. Generally, a violation of a defendant's constitutional rights will not result in dismissal of the charges unless the defendant can show that the violation was especially egregious.) That is, if the defendant objects or files a motion to suppress, the exclusionary rule would prohibit the prosecution from offering the statement as proof of guilt. However, the statement can be used to impeach the defendant's testimony. (Note: The statement must be "voluntary" under the due process clauses of the Fifth and Fourteenth Amendments. An involuntary statement cannot be used for any purpose.) Further, the fruit of the poisonous tree doctrine does not apply to Miranda violations. (Note: If the seizure of the defendant violated the fourth amendment any confession that resulted from the seizure would be subject to suppression. For example, an officer stops a defendant because the officer has a "gut feeling" that the defendant is driving while impaired. After the stop the officer asks the defendant if he had been drinking and the defendant says: "Yes". The officer then arrests the defendant and takes him to the law enforcement center to administer a breathalyzer test. While in the breathalyzer room the officer asks the defendant the questions on his alcohol influence report. The defendant's responses are incriminating. Under this scenario because the initial stop was unconstitutional all evidence that resulted from the stop would be subject to suppression.) Therefore, the exclusionary rule exceptions, attenuation, independent source and inevitable discovery, do not come into play, and derivative evidence would be fully admissible. For example, suppose the police continue with a custodial interrogation after the suspect has asserted his right to silence. During his post-assertion statement the suspect tells the police the location of the gun he used in the murder. Using this information the police find the gun. Forensic testing identifies the gun as the murder weapon, and fingerprints lifted from the gun match the suspect's. The contents of the Miranda-defective statement could not be offered by the prosecution as substantive evidence, but the gun itself and all related forensic evidence could be used as evidence at trial.

=== Procedural requirements ===
Although the rules vary by jurisdiction, generally a person who wishes to contest the admissibility of evidence (Note: Evidence includes physical evidence, confessions and identification evidence. Derivative evidence may also be excluded. See Federal Rules of Criminal Procedure 12(b), 41(e) and 41(f) respectively.) on the grounds that it was obtained in violation of his constitutional rights (Note: Most motions to suppress are based on violations of Fourth, Fifth, and Sixth Amendments and the due process clauses of the Fifth and Fourteenth Amendments.) must comply with the following procedural requirements:

1. The defendant must file a motion.
2. The motion must be in writing. (Note: Fed. R. Crim. P. 12 allows motions to be made orally or in writing in the court's discretion. But many courts have local rules of practice requiring written motions.)
3. The motion must be filed before trial.
4. The motion must allege the factual and legal grounds on which the defendant seeks suppression of evidence. (Note: The defendant should state with some specificity the legal grounds on which he challenges the admissibility of the evidence and should assert all available grounds. Failure to assert a ground may be treated as waiver. The defendant must also assert facts that show that a substantial claim exists. The assertion must be specific, detailed, definite and nonconjectural. Adams & Blinka, Pretrial Motions in Criminal Prosecutions, 2nd ed. (Lexis 1998) at 7. citing United States v. Calderon, 77 F.3rd 6, 9 (1st Cir. 1996) Conclusory statements such as the defendant was "coerced" or "under duress" carry little weight.)
5. The motion must be supported by affidavits or other documentary evidence. (Note: North Carolina requires that the affidavit be based on first hand knowledge or on information and belief. If information and belief, the affiant must state the source of his information and the reason for his belief that it is true. Attorney are reluctant for the defendant be the affiant. Although statements from the defendant in support of a motion to suppress cannot be used as substantive evidence of guilt, the statements can be used to impeach the defendant's testimony.)
6. The motion must be served on the state.

Failure to comply with a procedural requirement may result in summary dismissal of the motion. If the defendant meets the procedural requirement, the motion will normally be considered by the judge outside the presence of the jury. The judge hears evidence, determines the facts, makes conclusions of law and enters an order allowing or denying the motion.

== Related doctrines ==
In addition to Miranda, confession may be challenged under the Massiah Doctrine, the voluntariness standard, provisions of federal and state rules of criminal procedure and state constitutional provisions.

=== Massiah Doctrine ===
The Massiah Doctrine (established by Massiah v. United States) prohibits the admission of a confession obtained in violation of the defendant's Sixth Amendment right to counsel. Specifically, the Massiah rule applies to the use of testimonial evidence in criminal proceedings deliberately elicited by the police from a defendant after formal charges have been filed. The events that trigger the Sixth Amendment safeguards under Massiah are (1) the commencement of adversarial criminal proceedings and (2) deliberate elicitation of information from the defendant by governmental agents.

The Sixth Amendment guarantees a defendant a right to counsel in all criminal prosecutions. The purposes of the Sixth Amendment right to counsel are to protect a defendant's right to a fair trial and to assure that the adversarial system of justice functions properly by providing competent counsel as an advocate for the defendant in his contest against the "prosecutorial forces" of the state.

==== Commencement of adversarial criminal proceedings ====
The Sixth Amendment right "attaches" once the government has committed itself to the prosecution of the case by the initiation of adversarial judicial proceedings "by way of formal charge, preliminary hearing, indictment, information or arraignment". (Note: "In a line of constitutional cases in this Court stemming back to the Court's landmark opinion in Powell v. Alabama, 287 U.S. 45, it has been firmly established that a person's Sixth and Fourteenth Amendment right to counsel attaches only at or after the time that adversary judicial proceedings have been initiated against him. See Powell v. Alabama, supra; Johnson v. Zerbst, 304 U.S. 458; Hamilton v. Alabama, 368 U.S. 52; Gideon v. Wainwright, 372 U.S. 335; White v. Maryland, 373 U.S. 59; Massiah v. United States, 377 U.S. 201; United States v. Wade, 388 U.S. 218; Gilbert v. California, 388 U.S. 263; Coleman v. Alabama, 399 U.S. 1." "... [W]hile members of the Court have differed as to the existence of the right to counsel in the contexts of some of the above cases, all of those cases have involved points of time at or after the initiation of adversary judicial criminal proceedings—whether by way of formal charge, preliminary hearing, indictment, information, or arraignment.") Determining whether a particular event or proceeding constitutes the commencement of adversarial criminal proceedings requires both an examination of the rules of criminal procedure for the jurisdiction in which the crime is charged and the Supreme Court cases dealing with the issue of when formal prosecution begins. (Note: In Maine v. Moulton the court stated "By its very terms, it becomes applicable only when the government's role shifts from investigation to accusation. For it is only then that the assistance of one versed in the intricacies ... of law," ibid., is needed to assure that the prosecution's case encounters "the crucible of meaningful adversarial testing". The Sixth Amendment right to counsel does not attach until such time as the "government has committed itself to prosecute, and ... the adverse positions of government and defendant have solidified ...'".) Once adversarial criminal proceedings commence the right to counsel applies to all critical stages of the prosecution and investigation. A critical stage is "any stage of the prosecution, formal or informal, in court or out, where counsel's absence might derogate from the accused's right to a fair trial". (Note: Under the critical stage analysis, virtually every phase of the criminal trial is a critical stage. Additionally courts have generally held that pretrial hearings regarding conditions of pretrial release and suppression of evidence are considered critical stages. On the other hand, courts have generally held that certain pre-trial post accusation investigative procedures are not critical stages. Analysis of fingerprints, blood samples, clothing, hair, handwriting, and voice samples have all been ruled to be noncritical stages.)

Government attempts to obtain incriminating statement related to the offense charged from the defendant by overt interrogation or surreptitious means is a critical stage and any information thus obtained is subject to suppression unless the government can show that an attorney was present or the defendant knowingly, voluntarily and intelligently waived his right to counsel.

==== Deliberate elicitation of information from the defendant by governmental agents ====
Deliberate elicitation is defined as the intentional creation of circumstances by government agents that are likely to produce incriminating information from the defendant. Clearly express questioning (interrogation) would qualify but the concept also extends to surreptitious attempts to acquire information from the defendant through the use of undercover agents or paid informants. (Note: Massiah does not prohibit the government's use of a cellmate as a "silent listening post"—a person who is simply placed in a position to hear any incriminating statements the defendant might make about the charged offense but who does not do anything to coax or induce the defendant to talk about the charged crime.)

The definition of "deliberate elicitation" is not the same as the definition of "interrogation" under the Miranda rule. Miranda interrogation includes express questioning and any actions or statements that an officer would reasonably foresee as likely to cause an incriminating response. Massiah applies to express questioning and any attempt to deliberately and intentionally obtain incriminating information from the defendant regarding the crime charged. The difference is purposeful creation of an environment likely to produce incriminating information (Massiah) and action likely to induce an incriminating response even if that was not the officer's purpose or intent (Miranda).

The Sixth Amendment right to counsel is offense-specific – the right only applies to post-commencement attempts to obtain information relating to the crime charged. (Note: Lower federal courts has extended the Sixth Amendment right to counsel to factually related offenses. In Texas v. Cobb, the Supreme Court made clear that the right to counsel applied only to the crime charged and did not apply to attempts to gather information about "other offenses 'closely related factually' to the charged offense".) The right does not extend to uncharged offenses if factually related to the charged crime.

Information obtained in violation of the defendant's Sixth Amendment right to counsel is subject to suppression unless the government can establish that the defendant waived his right to counsel. The waiver must be knowing, intelligent and voluntary. A valid Miranda waiver operates as a waiver of Sixth Amendment right.

==== Miranda and Massiah compared ====
1. Constitutional basis:
  - Miranda is based on the Sixth Amendment right to counsel and the Fifth Amendment right to remain silent.
  - Massiah is based on the Sixth Amendment right to counsel.
2. Attachment:
  - Miranda: Custody + interrogation (charging status irrelevant).
  - Massiah: Formally charged + deliberate elicitation (custodial status irrelevant).
3. Scope:
  - a. Miranda applies to custodial interrogation by known governmental agents. Surreptitious acquisition of incriminating information allowed.
  - a. Massiah applies to overt and surreptitious interrogation.
  - b. Miranda is not offense specific.
  - b. Massiah is offense specific.
  - c. Miranda: interrogation + "functional equivalent"
  - c. Massiah: interrogation + "deliberate elicitation"
4. Waiver: Both Miranda and Massiah rights may be waived.
5. Assertion: In each case, the assertion must be clear and unequivocal. The effects of assertion are not identical. For purposes of Miranda, the police must immediately cease the interrogation and cannot resume interrogating the defendant about any offense charged or uncharged unless counsel is present or the defendant initiates contact for purposes of resuming interrogation and valid waiver obtained. Because Massiah is offense-specific, an assertion of the sixth amendment right to counsel requires the police to cease interrogating the defendant about any charged offense. Apparently the police could continue questioning the defendant about uncharged crimes assuming that the defendant was not in custody. The defendant's remedy would be to leave or to refuse to answer questions. (Note: Under Michigan v. Jackson, a defendant's request for counsel at a preliminary hearing constituted an assertion of his sixth amendment right to counsel. However, Michigan v. Jackson was overruled by Montejo v. Louisiana .)
6. Remedy for violation: The remedy for violation of Fifth and Sixth Amendment rights to counsel is identical: the statements and testimonial information are subject to suppression. Derivative evidence is not subject to suppression under Miranda – fruit of poisonous tree doctrine may apply to Massiah violation. Both Miranda and Massiah defective statements can be used for impeachment purposes.
7. Exceptions: The primary exceptions to Miranda are (1) the routine booking questions exception (2) the jail house informant exception and (3) the public safety exception. In Moulton v. Maine, the Supreme Court refused to recognize a public safety exception to the Massiah rule. Massiah allows for the use of jail house informants provided the informants serve merely as "passive listeners". (Note: The due process clauses of the Fifth and Fourteenth Amendments provide another basis for challenging the admissibility of confessions. The test is whether the statement was "voluntary". A statement is not voluntary if it was the product of police misconduct. That is, a due process claim requires that the defendant establish that there was police misconduct and that this misconduct induced the confession. The "voluntariness" test is implicated in any police interrogation—neither Miranda "custody" nor Massiah "commencement of formal criminal proceedings" is a necessary condition (state action is required). Further, there are no issues of waiver or assertion. Finally, the remedy is complete—an involuntary statement cannot be used for any purpose.)

=== The voluntariness standard ===
The voluntariness standard applies to all police interrogations regardless of the custodial status of the suspect and regardless of whether the suspect has been formally charged. The remedy for a violation of the standard is complete suppression of the statement and any evidence derived from the statement. The statement cannot be used as either substantive evidence of guilt or to impeach the defendant's testimony. (Note: Originally Miranda was regarded as a "prophylactic" rule—the rule itself was not a constitutional right but a " judicially–created enforcement mechanism" devised to protect the underlying constitutional rights. In Dickerson v. United States, the Court "constitutionalized" the Miranda rule—although the decision did not perforce change the rule concerning the use of a Miranda-defective statement for impeachment purposes.) The reason for the strictness is the common law's aversion to the use of coerced confessions because of their inherent unreliability. Further the rights to be free from coerced confession cannot be waived nor is it necessary that the victim of coercive police conduct assert his right. In considering the voluntariness standard one must consider the Supreme Court's decision in Colorado v. Connelly. Although federal courts' application of the Connelly rule has been inconsistent and state courts have often failed to appreciate the consequences of the case, Connelly clearly marked a significant change in the application of the voluntariness standard. Before Connelly, the test was whether the confession was voluntary considering the totality of the circumstances. "Voluntary" carried its everyday meaning: the confession had to be a product of the exercise of the defendant's free will rather than police coercion. After Connelly, the totality of circumstances test is not even triggered unless the defendant can show coercive police conduct. Questions of free will and rational decision making are irrelevant to a due process claim unless police misconduct existed and a causal connection can be shown between the misconduct and the confession.

=== State constitutional challenges ===
Every state constitution has articles and provision guaranteeing individual rights. In most cases the subject matter is similar to the federal bill of rights. (Note: This similarity is hardly surprising since the federal constitution and many state constitutions had common sources the state constitutions of some of the more important states such as Virginia.) Most state courts interpretation of their constitution is consistent with the interpretation federal court's of analogous provisions of the federal constitution. With regard to Miranda issues, state courts have exhibited significant resistance to incorporating into their state jurisprudence some of the limitations on the Miranda rule that have been created by the federal courts. As a consequence a defendant may be able to circumvent the federal limitation on the Miranda rule and successfully challenge the admissibility under state constitutional provisions. Practically every aspect of the Miranda rule has drawn state court criticism. However the primary point of contention involve the following limitations on the scope of the Miranda rule: (1) the Harris exception (Note: In Harris the United States Supreme Court allowed a Miranda-defective statement to be used to impeach the trial testimony of a defendant. Note the Harris rule does not permit the use of a statement that fails to meet the voluntariness standards of the due process clause to be used for any purpose. The basis for the distinction is that a Miranda-defective statement does not raise the questions of unreliability as does an involuntary statement.) (2) the Burbine rule (Note: In Moran v. Burbine, 475 U.S. 412 (1986) the Court held that officers are not required to tell a suspect in custody that third parties had retained an attorney for the suspect. The failure of the police to inform the suspect of this fact did not render the waiver involuntary. Burbine decision was not well-received by the state courts. Six states specifically rejected the Burbine rule.) and (3) the Fare rule. (Note: The specific holding in Fare was that a juvenile's request to have his probation officer present during an interrogation was not an invocation of the juvenile's right to counsel. The Supreme Court stated that juveniles were essentially to be treated the same as adults for the purposes of Miranda. Many states adopted special rules concerning police interrogation of juveniles.)

=== State statutory challenges ===
In addition to constitutionally based challenge, states permit a defendant to challenge the admissibility of a confession on the grounds that the confession was obtained in violation of a defendant's statutory rights. For example, North Carolina Criminal Procedure Act permits a defendant to move to suppress evidence obtained as a result of a "substantial" violation of the provision of the North Carolina Rules of Criminal Procedure.

== Confusion regarding use ==
Due to the prevalence of American television programs and motion pictures in which the police characters frequently read suspects their rights, it has become an expected element of arrest procedure—in the 2000 Dickerson decision, Chief Justice William Rehnquist wrote that Miranda warnings had "become embedded in routine police practice to the point where the warnings have become part of our national culture".

While arrests and interrogations can legally occur without the Miranda warning being given, this procedure would generally make the arrestee's pre-Miranda statements inadmissible at trial. (However, pursuant to the plurality opinion in United States v. Patane, physical evidence obtained as a result of pre-Miranda statements may still be admitted. There was no majority opinion of the Court in that case.)

In some jurisdictions, a detention differs at law from an arrest, and police are not required to give the Miranda warning until the person is arrested for a crime. In those situations, a person's statements made to police are generally admissible even though the person was not advised of their rights. Similarly, statements made while an arrest is in progress before the Miranda warning was given or completed are also generally admissible.

Because Miranda applies only to custodial interrogations, it does not protect detainees from standard booking questions such as name and address. Because it is a protective measure intended to safeguard the Fifth Amendment right against self-incrimination, it does not prevent the police from taking blood without a warrant from persons suspected of driving under the influence of alcohol. (Such evidence may be self-incriminatory, but are not considered statements of self-incrimination.)

If an inmate is in jail and invoked Miranda on one case, it is unclear whether this extends to any other cases that they may be charged with while in custody. For example, a subject is arrested, charged with cattle raiding, and is held in county jail awaiting trial. He invokes his Miranda rights on the cattle case. While in custody, he is involved in a fight where a staff member loses his ability to walk. He speaks to the custodial staff regarding the fight without first invoking Miranda. It is unclear if this statement is admissible because of the original Miranda statement.

Many police departments give special training to interrogators with regard to the Miranda warning; specifically, how to influence a suspect's decision to waive the right. For instance, the officer may be required to specifically ask if the rights are understood and if the suspect wishes to talk. The officer is allowed, before asking the suspect a question, to speak at length about evidence collected, witness statements, etc. The officer will then ask if the suspect wishes to talk, and the suspect is then more likely to talk in an attempt to refute the evidence presented. Another tactic commonly taught is never to ask a question; the officer may simply sit the suspect down in an interrogation room, sit across from him and do paperwork, and wait for the suspect to begin talking. These tactics are intended to mitigate the restrictions placed on law officers against compelling a suspect to give evidence, and have stood up in court as valid lawful tactics. Nevertheless, such tactics are condemned by legal rights groups as deceptive.

=== Exemption for interrogations conducted by undercover agents ===
In Illinois v. Perkins, 496 U.S. 292 (1990), the United States Supreme Court held that undercover officers are not required to give suspects a Miranda warning prior to asking questions that may elicit incriminating responses. In this case, an undercover agent posed as an inmate and carried on a 35-minute conversation with another inmate that he suspected of committing a murder that was being investigated. During this conversation, the suspect implicated himself in the murder that the undercover agent was investigating.

The Supreme Court came to this conclusion despite the government's admission that a custodial interrogation had been conducted by a government agent.

=== Report of warnings being given to detainees in Afghanistan ===
Beginning in 2009, some detainees captured in Afghanistan have been read their Miranda rights by the FBI, according to Congressman Michael Rogers of Michigan, who claims to have witnessed this himself. According to the Justice Department, "There has been no policy change nor blanket instruction for FBI agents to Mirandize detainees overseas. While there have been specific cases in which FBI agents have Mirandized suspects overseas at both Bagram and in other situations, in order to preserve the quality of evidence obtained, there has been no overall policy change with respect to detainees."

== Equivalent rights in other countries ==
Whether arising from their constitutions, common law, or statute, many nations recognize a defendant's right to silence.

== See also ==
- Arrest
- Civil rights
- Criminal justice
- Garrity warning
- Kalkines warning
- Right to silence
- Uniform Code of Military Justice
- United States constitutional criminal procedure
