= Ex parte Bain =

- Supreme Court of the United States

Argued March 8, 1887 Decided March 28, 1887
- Full case name: Ex parte George M. Bain, Jr.
- Citations: 121 U.S. 1 (more) 7 S. Ct. 781; 30 L. Ed. 849; 1887 U.S. LEXIS 2019

Holding
- When an indictment is filed with the court no change can be made in the body of the instrument by order of the court, or by the prosecuting attorney, without a resubmission of the case to the grand jury.

Court membership
- Chief Justice Morrison Waite Associate Justices Samuel F. Miller · Stephen J. Field; Joseph P. Bradley · John M. Harlan; William B. Woods · Stanley Matthews; Horace Gray · Samuel Blatchford

Case opinion
- Majority: Miller, joined by unanimous

Laws applied
- U.S. Const. amend. V
- Overruled by
- United States v. Miller (1985); United States v. Cotton (2002)

Ex parte Bain, 121 U.S. 1 (1887), was a United States Supreme Court case involving grand jury indictments.

== Background ==
George M. Bain, Jr. was indicted by a federal criminal grand jury and subsequently convicted for making a false report or statement as cashier of the Exchange National Bank of Norfolk, Virginia under U.S. Rev. Stat. § 5209. Post conviction, Bain filed a writ of habeas corpus, which the Supreme Court granted.

The Supreme Court granted Bain's motion after he produced evidence proving that the criminal grand jury indictment he was arrested under had been changed and was not resubmitted to the grand jury prior to his arrest. The Court found that even though the changes may have been negligible, federal courts lose jurisdiction to even make that determination once an indictment by a grand jury has been changed and not resubmitted. The grand jury indictment was changed, therefore there was no valid grand jury indictment as required for federal arrests under the Fifth Amendment to the United States Constitution.

== Holding ==
When an indictment is filed with the court no change can be made in the body of the instrument by order of the court, or by the prosecuting attorney, without a resubmission of the case to the grand jury. Even though a court may deem a change immaterial, it makes no difference. The instrument, as changed, is no longer the indictment of the grand jury which presented it.

== Subsequent developments ==
The U.S. Supreme Court in Bain set a rigid standard for federal law enforcement officials to follow when obtaining a federal grand jury indictment. The Court sent the message that grand jury indictments, as required per the Fifth Amendment, would be held to a strict standard. In Bain, the Court concluded that any change in a grand jury indictment, no matter how mundane, would require resubmission to the grand jury. In 1985, upon returning to the issue of grand jury indictments in the case of United States v. Miller (1985), the Court decided on a somewhat looser interpretation of the Fifth Amendment requirements as set forth in Bain. Now, modifications to a grand jury indictments, if only to reduce charges, make simple changes, or remove text, are allowed.

Bain has been overruled in part by United States v. Cotton, 535 U.S. 625 (2002).
