= Kalkines warning =

Under US law, a disciplinary advisement to federal employees

The Kalkines warning is an advisement of rights usually administered by United States federal government agents to federal employees and contractors in internal investigations. The Kalkines warning compels subjects to make statements or face disciplinary action up to, and including, dismissal, but also provides suspects with criminal immunity for their statements. It was promulgated by the U.S. Court of Federal Claims in Kalkines v. United States.

In Kalkines, the plaintiff lost his job with the Bureau of Customs of the U.S. Department of the Treasury because he refused to answer questions during four interviews about a bribery accusation. The criminal investigation proceeded simultaneously with the initial three interviews while the U.S. attorney chose not to move forward with prosecution before the fourth interview took place. The court held that an employee "can be removed for not replying if he is adequately informed both that he is subject to discharge for not answering and that his replies (and their fruits) cannot be employed against him in a criminal case." The court decided to reverse the plaintiff’s dismissal from federal service and ordered payment of back wages because he hadn’t received certain information.

The Kalkines warning helps to ensure an employee's constitutional rights, while also helping federal agents effectively conduct internal and administrative investigations.

== Kalkines warning example ==
A typical Kalkines warning (exact wording varies between federal investigative agencies) may read as follows:

The purpose of this interview is to obtain information which will assist in the determination of whether administrative action is warranted.

- You are going to be asked a number of specific questions concerning the performance of your official duties.
- You have a duty to reply to these questions, and agency disciplinary action, including dismissal, may be undertaken if you refuse to answer, or fail to reply fully and truthfully.
- The answers you furnish and any information or evidence resulting therefrom may be used in the course of civil or administrative proceedings.
- Neither your answers nor any information or evidence which is gained by reason of such statements can be used against you in any criminal proceedings, except that if you knowingly and willfully provide false statements or information in your answers, you may be criminally prosecuted for that action.

Because the Kalkines warnings threaten the interviewee with discipline, giving them will ordinarily render both statements and all evidence derived from them inadmissible in a future prosecution of the interviewee. The government can still use the statements and other evidence traceable to such an interview to impose discipline agency, and civil proceedings.

== See also ==
- Garrity warning
- Miranda warning
