= United States v. Miller (disambiguation) =

United States v. Miller may refer to the following United States Supreme Court cases:

- United States v. Miller (1908)
- United States v. Miller (1912)
- United States v. Miller (1939), a landmark decision of the U.S. Supreme Court that involved a Second Amendment challenge to the National Firearms Act of 1934
- United States v. Miller (1943)
- United States v. Miller (1976), a landmark U.S. Supreme Court case that dealt with Fourth Amendment rights
- United States v. Miller (1985)
- United States v. Miller (2025)

== See also ==
- Miller v. United States (disambiguation)
- Lists of United States Supreme Court cases
- Lists of United States Supreme Court cases by volume
