= Garrity warning =

Type of advisement of rights in the US

In United States law, the Garrity warning is a notification of rights usually administered by federal, state, or local investigators to their employees who may be the subject of an internal investigation. The Garrity warning advises subjects of their criminal and administrative liability for any statements they may make, but also advises subjects of their right to remain silent on any issues that tend to implicate them in a crime. (See Kalkines warning concerning federal employees.)

It was devised in response to the Supreme Court of the United States ruling in Garrity v. New Jersey (1967). In that case, a police officer was compelled, under threat of termination, to make a statement or be fired, and then criminally prosecuted for his statement. The Supreme Court found that the officer had been deprived of his Fifth Amendment right to silence.

A typical Garrity warning (exact wording varies between state and/or local investigative agencies) may read as follows:

You are being asked to provide information as part of an internal and/or administrative investigation. This is a voluntary interview and you do not have to answer questions if your answers would tend to implicate you in a crime. No disciplinary action will be taken against you solely for refusing to answer questions. However, the evidentiary value of your silence may be considered in administrative proceedings as part of the facts surrounding your case. Any statement you do choose to provide may not be used as evidence in criminal proceedings.

The Garrity warning helps to ensure the subject's constitutional rights, while also helping state or local investigators obtain relevant evidence.

== See also ==
- Kalkines warning
- Miranda warning
