= Berghuis v. Thompkins =

- Supreme Court of the United States

Argued March 1, 2010 Decided June 1, 2010
- Full case name: Mary Berghuis, Warden v. Van Chester Thompkins
- Docket no.: 08-1470
- Citations: 560 U.S. 370 (more) 130 S. Ct. 2250; 176 L. Ed. 2d 1098
- Argument: Oral argument

Case history
- Prior: Defendant convicted; aff'd, Mich. Ct. App., February 3, 2004 (per curiam, unpublished); review denied, 683 N.W.2d 676 (Mich. 2004); petition denied, E.D. Mich.; rev'd, 547 F.3d 572 (6th Cir. 2008); cert. granted, 557 U.S. 965 (2009).

Holding
- A suspect's silence during interrogation does not invoke their right to remain silent under Miranda v. Arizona. The invocation of that right must be unambiguous, and silence is not enough. Voluntarily and knowingly responding to police interrogation after remaining silent constitutes a waiver of the right to remain silent, provided that a Miranda warning was given and the suspect understood it.

Court membership
- Chief Justice John Roberts Associate Justices John P. Stevens · Antonin Scalia; Anthony Kennedy · Clarence Thomas; Ruth Bader Ginsburg · Stephen Breyer; Samuel Alito · Sonia Sotomayor

Case opinions
- Majority: Kennedy, joined by Roberts, Scalia, Thomas, Alito
- Dissent: Sotomayor, joined by Stevens, Ginsburg, Breyer

Laws applied
- U.S. Const. amends. V, VI

Berghuis v. Thompkins, 560 U.S. 370 (2010), is a landmark decision by the Supreme Court of the United States in which the Court held that, unless and until a criminal suspect explicitly states that they are relying on their right to remain silent, their voluntary statements may be used in court and police may continue to question them. The mere act of remaining silent is not sufficient to imply the suspect has invoked their rights even when the suspect actually intended their silence to have that effect. Furthermore, a voluntary reply even after lengthy silence can be construed as waiving the right to remain silent.

The Court was split, 5–4. The dissent, authored by Justice Sonia Sotomayor, argued that Miranda v. Arizona and other previous cases had required the waiver of a constitutional right to be much clearer, especially because of the "compelling influence" that an interrogation causes after police have spent several hours pressuring a suspect.

Many considered Berghuis the latest in a line of cases eroding Miranda. At least one scholar argued that Berghuis effectively gutted Miranda. The opinion is commonly criticized as giving police permission to compromise vulnerable citizens in interrogation and, in effect, making it easier for the police to work around the theoretical existence of those citizens' rights.

== Background of the case ==
=== Legal background ===
Under U.S. law and with rare exceptions, (Note: Three examples of potential exceptions are: 1. Grand jury witnesses may be given a grant of immunity and compelled to give testimony under oath. A grant of immunity removes the possibility of the jeopardy of self incrimination, and therefore removes the right to remain silent to avoid self incrimination.; 2. The right against self-incrimination does not prevent a self-regulatory organization (SRO), such as the National Association of Securities Dealers (NASD), from imposing otherwise valid sanctions when the privilege is validly asserted, since these organizations are generally not considered as state actors.; 3. In Raffel v. United States, 271 U.S. 494 (1926), the U.S. Supreme Court indicated that a criminal defendant who voluntarily testifies in his own behalf waives completely his privilege under the Fifth Amendment. ("The safeguards against self-incrimination are for the benefit of those who do not wish to become witnesses in their own behalf and not for those who do. There is a sound policy in requiring the accused who offers himself as a witness to do so without reservation")) people (whether criminal suspects or defendants or not) have the right to remain silent as part of their right not to incriminate themselves under the Fifth Amendment to the United States Constitution. Remaining silent is optional—they may speak or be silent as they wish. The Miranda warning concerns the duty of the police or other formal questioners to make sure that the suspect is aware they have that right prior to questioning, in case they want to be silent at some point or the suspect later pleads ignorance that they had the right (and would have relied upon it had they been aware). Miranda v. Arizona, 384 U.S. 436 (1966), and related cases contemplate that a suspect might invoke their rights (make clear they wish to rely on them), waive their rights (make clear they do not wish to rely on them), or do neither of these. A number of cases such as the present one, refine Miranda by addressing when and at what point a suspect, who is aware that they have the right to remain silent, is said to have begun to rely on that right, as opposed to when they were aware of the right but were not choosing to rely on it.

=== Interrogation and conviction ===
Police considered Van Chester Thompkins a suspect in a fatal shooting on January 10, 2000, in Southfield, Michigan. After advising Thompkins of his Miranda rights, police officers interrogated him. Thompkins did not state at any time that he wanted to rely on his right to remain silent, that he refused to talk to the police, or that he wanted an attorney. The court record suggested that he had been almost completely silent during the three-hour interrogation and the few sporadic comments he made had no bearing on the case (police described it as "nearly a monologue"). Towards the end, detectives tried a "spiritual" approach to "appeal to his conscience and religious beliefs". The police asked Thompkins three questions: did he believe in God, did he pray to God, and did he pray to God to forgive him for shooting the victim. He answered "yes" to each of these.

Thompkins made a motion to suppress the statements, claiming that he had invoked his Fifth Amendment right to remain silent by remaining silent, that he had not waived that right, and that his incriminating statements were involuntary. The trial court denied his motion, a jury found Thompkins guilty, and the court sentenced Thompkins to life imprisonment without the possibility of parole. Of note, there had been significant other evidence of guilt corroborating the conviction.

=== State court appeal and federal court habeas corpus proceedings ===
Thompkins appealed his conviction on grounds that included suppression of his admission—that he had invoked and not waived his right to remain silent—and deficient representation related to improper jury instructions, but the Michigan Court of Appeals rejected Thompkins' Miranda claim. Thompkins then filed a writ of habeas corpus in federal District Court but it denied his request. However, the United States Court of Appeals for the Sixth Circuit reversed the District Court's decision, holding that the state court was unreasonable in finding an implied waiver of Thompkins' right to remain silent.

=== Petition to the U.S. Supreme Court ===
The state's petition to the Supreme Court said the questioning in the case had not been coercive, and the state offered the Court theories to support the idea that extended silence should not be construed as an invocation. For example, it said that initial reluctance to talk was not inherently a communication by the suspect to the officer that they were terminating the interview, which is what an exercise of the right to silence is. If the suspect was terminating the interview, then the suspect would not be able to hear any of the evidence against them before making a decision. In other words, the state asserted that requiring the suspect to explicitly invoke the right to silence was actually in the suspect's best interest.

Opposing the state's position, the National Association of Criminal Defense Lawyers and American Civil Liberties Union filed a joint Amicus Curiae brief that argued the police officers strategically chose not to ask Thompkins if he would willingly waive his Miranda rights because that would have invited him to do so explicitly. In their view, a so-called "waiver-first" rule where the police must ask for a waiver was "the most effective way to avoid the very evil that [Miranda] sought to address, namely that the highly coercive and intimidating custodial environment compels unwilling suspects to speak." They warned that, if the Court embraced a so-called "waiver by confession" rule, Miranda would be directly undermined because the coercive effect of hours of pressure in the interrogation environment could be ignored by courts just because the police heard what they wanted to hear.

== The Court's decision ==
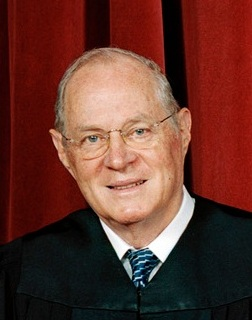
Justice Kennedy wrote the decision of the Court.

On June 1, 2010, by a vote of 5–4, the Supreme Court reversed the Sixth Circuit's decision. In the Opinion of the Court, written by Associate Justice Anthony Kennedy, the Court ruled that Thompkins's silence during the interrogation did not invoke his right to remain silent and that he had waived his right to remain silent when he knowingly and voluntarily made a statement to police.

The Court quickly dismissed Thompkins's ineffective assistance of counsel claim with the test from Strickland v. Washington: Thompkins needed to show that his lawyer's performance was objectively deficient and that he was prejudiced by the result. The Court said that it was "doubtful" that the lawyer's performance was objectively deficient because the lawyer neglected to request a jury instruction informing the jury of the acquittal of Thompkins's alleged accomplice. But, even if it had been deficient, the Court said there was enough other evidence of guilt corroborating the conviction that it was unlikely the jury instruction would have made a difference, so there was no prejudice.

=== Majority opinion ===
The Court reasoned as follows on Thompkins' various arguments:

There was no good reason why the standard for invoking the Miranda right to remain silent and the Miranda right to counsel should differ because both require the interrogation to end when the right is explicitly invoked. Making either of these statements would have ended the questions but Thompkins made neither of them.

The Court further concluded (in line with previous cases such as Davis v. United States) that there was good reason why invoking Miranda rights should require an unambiguous act of the accused and that courts should not look for implied invocations in the words of actions of the accused. These reasons included certainty for the police, the prosecutors, and the accused. The Court also cited social benefits from law enforcement.

The Court then considered whether the accused had taken action that waived those rights. Waiver must be a free choice with full awareness (Moran v. Burbine). Miranda v. Arizona (the Miranda ruling) states that "[A] heavy burden rests on the government to demonstrate that the defendant knowingly and intelligently waived his privilege against self-incrimination and his right to retained or appointed counsel." It was noted that the accused had read and expressed understanding of the rights, and had them read aloud, he had not pleaded lack of understanding, was given time, and therefore knew his rights. Specifically, having read the 5th warning ("you have the right to decide at any time before or during questioning to use your right to remain silent and your right to talk with a lawyer while you are being questioned") he was aware this right was enduring and could be applied at any time in the questioning if he chose, and the police would have to honor the invocation if he did so. The Court observed that "[p]olice are not required to rewarn suspects from time to time". That a question is linked to religious beliefs does not cause the reply to be "involuntary". The accused, understanding his rights and that they were capable of invocation at any point, had not chosen to invoke them.

The custodial interview ended about 15 minutes after the following. "Q: Do you believe in God. A: Yes Q: Do you pray to God? A: Yes Q: Do you pray to God to forgive you for shooting that boy down? A: Yes." {Berghuis v. Thompkins, 560 U.S. 370, 376, 130 S. Ct. 2250, 2257 L. Ed. 2d. 1098 (2010).}

The case of North Carolina v. Butler 441 U.S. 369 (1979) showed that a waiver of Miranda rights may be implied through "the defendant's silence, coupled with an understanding of his rights and a course of conduct indicating waiver". The Court held that where a Miranda warning had been given and was understood by the accused, an accused's uncoerced statement established an implied waiver of the right to remain silent. Thompkins' answer to the police question, having understood but not chosen to invoke his rights, was sufficient to show a course of conduct indicating waiver. Further corroboration was that he had sporadically made other comments as well.

The Court concluded that:

In sum, a suspect who has received and understood the Miranda warnings, and has not invoked his Miranda rights, waives the right to remain silent by making an uncoerced statement to the police. Thompkins did not invoke his right to remain silent and stop the questioning. Understanding his rights in full, he waived his right to remain silent by making a voluntary statement to the police.

=== Sotomayor's dissent ===
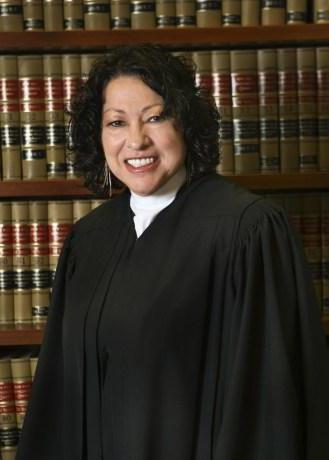
Justice Sotomayor wrote the dissenting opinion.

Associate Justice Sonia Sotomayor wrote the dissenting opinion for four Justices, her first major dissenting opinion on the Court. She wrote that the case represented "a substantial retreat from the protection against compelled self-incrimination that Miranda v. Arizona has long provided during custodial interrogation", and that "[S]uspects must now unambiguously invoke their right to remain silent—which, counterintuitively, requires them to speak. At the same time, suspects will be legally presumed to have waived their rights even if they have given no clear expression of their intent to do so."

The dissent noted that the government must satisfy the "high standar[d] of proof for the waiver of constitutional rights [set forth in] Johnson v. Zerbst." It cited from Miranda that:

[A] valid waiver will not be presumed simply from the silence of the accused after warnings are given or simply from the fact that a confession was in fact eventually obtained [...] the fact of lengthy interrogation... before a statement is made is strong evidence that the accused did not validly waive his rights. In these circumstances the fact that the individual eventually made a statement is consistent with the conclusion that the compelling influence of the interrogation finally forced him to do so. It is inconsistent with any notion of a voluntary relinquishment of the privilege.

and that Miranda and North Carolina v. Butler both agreed that:

[a] court 'must presume that a defendant did not waive his right[s]'; the prosecution bears a 'heavy burden' in attempting to demonstrate waiver; the fact of a 'lengthy interrogation' prior to obtaining statements is 'strong evidence' against a finding of valid waiver; 'mere silence' in response to questioning is 'not enough'; and waiver may not be presumed 'simply from the fact that a confession was in fact eventually obtained'.

The Court had previously observed that "while the privilege [against self-incrimination] is sometimes a shelter to the guilty, [it] is often a protection to the innocent" and that "[f]or these reasons, we have observed, a criminal law system which comes to depend on the 'confession' will, in the long run, be less reliable and more subject to abuses than a system relying on independent investigation."

Although giving "sporadic" comments during the interview, no answers had been given that touched upon the case. The Court had not previously considered "whether a suspect can invoke the right to remain silent by remaining uncooperative and nearly silent for 2 hours and 45 minutes" and the dissent considered that silence throughout a lengthy interrogation "long past the point when he could be deciding whether to respond[,] cannot reasonably be understood other than as an invocation of the right to remain silent". Butler also distinguished between a "sufficient course of conduct" and mere "inculpatory statements".

The dissent concluded that the ruling was unnecessary in the changes it established, "flatly contradicts" Miranda and Butler, and that "[e]ven if Thompkins did not invoke that right, he is entitled to relief because Michigan did not satisfy its burden of establishing waiver".

== Other views ==
=== Legal views and responses ===
Responses to the ruling were divided with a significant number of commentators focusing upon the erosion of Miranda, and others commenting upon the impact of the case on terrorism suspect interviews—a topic where Congress had recently attempted to legislate.

Cornell Law School professor Sherry F. Colb's discussion of the decision at Findlaw.com was one of the former. She called the decision "an alarming break with the philosophy of Miranda v. Arizona [that] leaves that decision to stand as an arbitrary disclosure requirement, rather than the protection against coercive interrogation that it was originally crafted to be". The author noted the purpose of Miranda was to address psychologically pressured interviews and that it had noted that adequate protection was essential in order "to dispel the compulsion inherent in custodial surroundings". The Miranda decision was intended to prevent coercion, not merely to require a "disclosure of legal facts". The present decision "allow[ed] a waiver of the right to occur after interrogation had commenced, through a response to that interrogation". As a result, two subtly different meanings of "right to remain silent" could be construed, and a suspect who was (in the words of Miranda v. Arizona) "vulnerable, unassertive, and in need of protection"—precisely the kind of suspect Miranda aimed at protecting—would be left unaware "that one must utter magic words to go from possessing only one of these rights (to remain silent while interrogation takes place) to possessing the other right (to avoid interrogation altogether). In that way, according to Colb, Berghuis transformed Miranda's guarantee of rights into a trap.

UC Berkeley law professor John Yoo, author of the Torture Memos for the Bush Administration, responded in a matching article in the same publication. Yoo said Berghuis provided interpretive guidance when a suspect says nothing for an extended period. More significantly, he wrote, Berghuis symbolized and paralleled the Obama administration's favoring of the pre-2001 "terrorism-as-crime" paradigm over the "terrorism-as-war" paradigm of the Bush era. (See anti-terrorism legislation and Bush Doctrine). Yoo predicted that this perspective could influence terrorism cases when the opponents were declared to be at war because "interrogation would seek actionable intelligence to stop attacks, not confessions for use in civilian trials". Yoo concluded that the court's "new flexibility" might allow it to "ease the burden" on military, intelligence and police" by permitting "more [flexible responses to] terrorism within the criminal-justice paradigm, though at the expense of weakening the civil rights of all Americans." Yoo speculated that Berghuis may have clarified that Miranda was not relevant where information was not being collected for use at a trial, allowing it to act in mitigation of "weak anti-terrorism policies."

Kent Scheidegger, legal director of the Criminal Justice Legal Foundation, stated that the Berghuis decision was an acknowledgement of practical realities during interactions between police and suspects. He praised the court for placing limits on Miranda's "artificial rule that is not really in the Constitution." He did not interpret the decision as damaging to the right against self-incrimination.

Emily Berman, counsel at the Brennan Center for Justice at the NYU School of Law predicted that "Police will interrogate criminal suspects who do not explicitly invoke their rights—often, those will be suspects who are unsophisticated, poorly educated or mentally ill—for hours on end. This will lead, just as inevitably, to more coerced—and therefore unreliable—confessions... the very phenomenon that Miranda aimed to eliminate." She noted the Attorney General's comment that Miranda warnings had not deterred terrorism suspects such as Umar Farouk Abdulmutallab and Faisal Shahzad from talking and providing "valuable intelligence". She was reflecting upon attempts by Congress to amend Miranda legislatively, which the Supreme Court had previously opposed. She concluded that, although the Supreme Court would not tolerate legislative change to Miranda, the Supreme Court itself was overly willing to narrow the rule itself.

Other legal responses included Stanford University law professor Robert Weisberg, who stated that "this decision authorizes lower courts to construe ambiguous situations in favor of police and prosecutors," and University of Michigan law professor Richard Friedman, who concluded, "This decision means that police can keep shooting questions at a suspect who refuses to talk as long as they want in hopes that the person will crack and give them some information." Steven Shapiro, legal director of the ACLU, stated on similar lines that Berghuis "seriously undermines" Miranda, in which the court had "recognized that a suspect in police custody can be worn down by prolonged questioning and other interrogation tactics". Charles Weisselberg, a professor at Berkeley Law School, argued that Berghuis effectively gutted Miranda, saying "the majority in [Berghuis] rejected the fundamental underpinnings of Miranda v. Arizona's prophylactic rule and established a new one that fails to protect the rights of suspects." He further observed that neither Michigan nor the Solicitor General cited any previous example of a court agreeing that a suspect had given an implied waiver after being questioned for over three hours. He concluded that Berghuis was "an implied waiver doctrine on steroids."

=== Media response ===
National and regional media outlets reported a range of views similar to the above:

- The Kansas City Star said that Berghuis was yet another decision that had "effectively nipped away at the Miranda ruling." The Star lamented that "few outside the legal community have taken note of the trend" because it had been happening gradually and the decisions favored the police over alleged criminals. The Star declared that "[z]eal for fighting crime shouldn't be allowed to undercut American standards like 'innocent until proven guilty'," and that "[g]ood policing is based on building cases, not on coercing confessions." It praised the dissent of Sotomayor, then the newest justice at the court.

- The Bakersfield Californian stated that "local attorneys [are] mixed on the decision," citing a variety of local attorneys. These included a defense attorney who said, "Time will tell whether this activist conservative-majority Supreme Court is doing the right thing in moving back the clock on Miranda rights," and a district attorney who said, "Miranda had been broadened over the years far beyond what was necessary for its original goal of protecting suspects from [coercion]. ...Police culture has dramatically changed for the better in the 40-plus years since it came into being". A second defense attorney complained that Berghuis put too much pressure on a person who was "already in an incredibly stressful situation" and would lead to false confessions. A county public defender opined that the ruling was not unfavorable, as a clear answer would be preferable to uncertainty. Local police stated the ruling did not affect how interrogations would be conducted.

- The Philadelphia Inquirer asked, "Since when do Americans have to declare their constitutional rights out loud in order to claim them?" Further, the Inquirer commented, "The fact that DNA exonerations often upend criminal confessions that turn out to have been coerced after lengthy interrogations demonstrates the risks of such police procedures. That's a key reason Miranda rights were established in the first place". It concluded that "[i]t may seem to some that the high court ruling will enable police to nab more bad guys and make the charges stick. But by setting up a 'gotcha' set of rules about a key constitutional protection, the high court has eroded individual liberty for all Americans."

A number of newspapers, including well known and national titles such as USA Today, The New York Times and The Washington Post, and titles such as Associated Press and The Washington Times, reported the facts on both sides without stating a strong editorial position in their coverage.

== Subsequent ruling in Salinas v. Texas ==
In Salinas v. Texas, 570 U.S. 178 (2013), the Supreme Court extended Berghuis by holding that, prior to any arrest, the police are not required to explicitly inform an interviewee that they have a right to remain silent under the Fifth Amendment.

In Salinas, Genevevo Salinas of Houston had voluntarily gone to a police station when officers asked him to accompany them to talk about the murder of two men. Salinas answered most of the officers' questions, but simply remained silent when they asked him whether shotgun casings found at the scene of the murders would match his gun. He shifted his feet, and otherwise acted nervously, but did not say anything. Later, at his trial, prosecutors told jurors that his silence in the face of that question showed that he was guilty, that he knew that the shotgun used to kill the victims was his. Salinas' lawyer wanted the Supreme Court to rule that the simple fact of silence during police questioning, when an individual was not under arrest, could not be used against that person at a criminal trial.

The Salinas Court held that a suspect's silence in response to a specific question posed during an interview with police when the suspect was not in custody and the suspect had been voluntarily answering other questions during that interview could be used against him in court where he did not explicitly invoke his Fifth Amendment right to silence in response to the specific question. Of the five justices who concluded that the suspect's silence could be used against him in these circumstances, Justices Alito and Kennedy and Chief Justice Roberts concluded that the defendant's Fifth Amendment claim failed because he did not expressly invoke the privilege. The other two Justices, Thomas and Scalia, concluded that the defendant's claim would fail even if he had invoked the privilege, on the theory that the prosecutor's comment at the trial—regarding the defendant's silence in response to a question during the police interview—did not compel the defendant to give self-incriminating testimony.

In essence the Supreme Court ruled the Fifth Amendment's Self-Incrimination Clause does not protect a defendant's refusal to answer questions asked by law enforcement before he has been arrested or read his Miranda rights. In the concrete case the court issued the following holding: When petitioner had not yet been placed in custody or received Miranda warnings, and voluntarily responded to some questions by police about a murder, the prosecution's use of his silence in response to another question as evidence of his guilt at trial did not violate the Fifth Amendment because petitioner failed to expressly invoke his privilege not to incriminate himself in response to the officer's question. Long-standing judicial precedent has held that any witness who desires protection against self-incrimination must explicitly claim that protection. This requirement ensures that the government is put on notice when a defendant intends to claim this privilege and allows the government to either argue that the testimony is not self-incriminating or offer immunity. The plurality opinion of Justices Alito, Roberts and Kennedy reiterated two exceptions to this principle: 1) that a criminal defendant does not need to take the stand at trial in order to explicitly claim this privilege; and 2) that failure to claim this privilege must be excused when that failure was due to government coercion. The plurality opinion declined to extend these exceptions to the situation in Salinas v. Texas. Notwithstanding popular misconceptions, the Court held that the Fifth Amendment does not establish a complete right to remain silent but only guarantees that a criminal defendant may not be forced to testify against himself or herself. Therefore, as long as police do not deprive defendants of the opportunity to claim a Fifth Amendment privilege, there is no Constitutional violation. The Court stated that there was no "ritualistic formula" necessary to assert the privilege against self-incrimination, but that a person could not do so "by simply standing mute." If an individual fails to invoke his right, and is later charged with a crime, at trial the prosecution may use his silence as evidence of his guilt.
