= List of United States Supreme Court cases, volume 121 =

Supreme Court of the United States
- Interactive map of Supreme Court of the United States
- 38°53′26″N 77°00′16″W
- Established: March 4, 1789; 236 years ago
- Location: Washington, D.C.
- Coordinates: 38°53′26″N 77°00′16″W
- Composition method: Presidential nomination with Senate confirmation
- Authorised by: Constitution of the United States, Art. III, § 1
- Judge term length: life tenure, subject to impeachment and removal
- Number of positions: 9 (by statute)
- Website: supremecourt.gov

This is a list of cases reported in volume 121 of United States Reports, decided by the Supreme Court of the United States in 1887.

== Justices of the Supreme Court at the time of volume 121 U.S. ==
The Supreme Court is established by Article III, Section 1 of the Constitution of the United States, which says: "The judicial Power of the United States, shall be vested in one supreme Court . . .". The size of the Court is not specified; the Constitution leaves it to Congress to set the number of justices. Under the Judiciary Act of 1789 Congress originally fixed the number of justices at six (one chief justice and five associate justices). Since 1789 Congress has varied the size of the Court from six to seven, nine, ten, and back to nine justices (always including one chief justice).

When the cases in volume 121 U.S. were decided the Court comprised the following nine members:

Portrait	Justice	Office	Home State	Succeeded	Date confirmed by the Senate (Vote)	Tenure on Supreme Court
	Morrison Waite	Chief Justice	Ohio	Salmon P. Chase	January 21, 1874 (63–0)	March 4, 1874 – March 23, 1888 (Died)
	Samuel Freeman Miller	Associate Justice	Iowa	Peter Vivian Daniel	July 16, 1862 (Acclamation)	July 21, 1862 – October 13, 1890 (Died)
	Stephen Johnson Field	Associate Justice	California	newly created seat	March 10, 1863 (Acclamation)	May 10, 1863 – December 1, 1897 (Retired)
	Joseph P. Bradley	Associate Justice	New Jersey	newly created seat	March 21, 1870 (46–9)	March 23, 1870 – January 22, 1892 (Died)
	John Marshall Harlan	Associate Justice	Kentucky	David Davis	November 29, 1877 (Acclamation)	December 10, 1877 – October 14, 1911 (Died)
	William Burnham Woods	Associate Justice	Georgia	William Strong	December 21, 1880 (39–8)	January 5, 1881 – May 14, 1887 (Died)
	Stanley Matthews	Associate Justice	Ohio	Noah Haynes Swayne	May 12, 1881 (24–23)	May 17, 1881 – March 22, 1889 (Died)
	Horace Gray	Associate Justice	Massachusetts	Nathan Clifford	December 20, 1881 (51–5)	January 9, 1882 – September 15, 1902 (Died)
	Samuel Blatchford	Associate Justice	New York	Ward Hunt	March 22, 1882 (Acclamation)	April 3, 1882 – July 7, 1893 (Died)

== Notable Case in 121 U.S. ==
=== Ex parte Bain ===
In Ex parte Bain, 121 U.S. 1 (1887), the Supreme Court held that when an indictment is filed with a federal court, no change can be made in the body of the instrument by order of the court or by the prosecuting attorney without resubmitting the case to the grand jury. Even though a court may deem a change immaterial, the instrument, as revised, is no longer the indictment of the grand jury which presented it. Bain was overruled in part by the Court in United States v. Cotton, 535 U.S. 625 (2002).

== Citation style ==
Under the Judiciary Act of 1789 the federal court structure at the time comprised District Courts, which had general trial jurisdiction; Circuit Courts, which had mixed trial and appellate (from the US District Courts) jurisdiction; and the United States Supreme Court, which had appellate jurisdiction over the federal District and Circuit courts—and for certain issues over state courts. The Supreme Court also had limited original jurisdiction (i.e., in which cases could be filed directly with the Supreme Court without first having been heard by a lower federal or state court). There were one or more federal District Courts and/or Circuit Courts in each state, territory, or other geographical region.

Bluebook citation style is used for case names, citations, and jurisdictions.

- "C.C.D." = United States Circuit Court for the District of . . .
  - e.g.,"C.C.D.N.J." = United States Circuit Court for the District of New Jersey
- "D." = United States District Court for the District of . . .
  - e.g.,"D. Mass." = United States District Court for the District of Massachusetts
- "E." = Eastern; "M." = Middle; "N." = Northern; "S." = Southern; "W." = Western
  - e.g.,"C.C.S.D.N.Y." = United States Circuit Court for the Southern District of New York
  - e.g.,"M.D. Ala." = United States District Court for the Middle District of Alabama
- "Ct. Cl." = United States Court of Claims
- The abbreviation of a state's name alone indicates the highest appellate court in that state's judiciary at the time.
  - e.g.,"Pa." = Supreme Court of Pennsylvania
  - e.g.,"Me." = Supreme Judicial Court of Maine

== List of cases in volume 121 U.S. ==
Case Name	Page and year	Opinion of the Court	Concurring opinion(s)	Dissenting opinion(s)	Lower Court	Disposition
Ex parte Bain	1 (1887)	Miller	None	None	C.C.E.D. Va.	habeas corpus granted
Worden v. Searls	14 (1887)	Blatchford	None	None	C.C.E.D. Mich.	reversed
Richmond v. Irons	27 (1887)	Matthews	None	None	C.C.N.D. Ill.	reversed
Merchants' Insurance Company v. Allen	67 (1887)	Waite	None	None	C.C.E.D. La.	affirmed
First National Bank v. Shedd	74 (1887)	Waite	None	None	C.C.W.D. Pa.	affirmed
Carper v. Fitzgerald	87 (1887)	Waite	None	None	C.C.E.D. Va.	dismissed
United States v. McDougall's Administrator	89 (1887)	Harlan	None	None	Ct. Cl.	reversed
Royall v. Virginia	102 (1887)	Waite	None	None	Va.	reversed
Grant v. Phoenix Life Insurance Company	118 (1887)	Blatchford	None	None	Sup. Ct. D.C.	affirmed
Town of Bloomfield v. Charter Oak National Bank	121 (1887)	Gray	None	None	C.C.D. Conn.	reversed
Mercantile National Bank v. City of New York	138 (1887)	Matthews	None	None	C.C.S.D.N.Y.	affirmed
National Newark Banking Company v. City of Newark	163 (1887)	Matthews	None	None	C.C.D.N.J.	affirmed
Town of Concord v. Robinson	165 (1887)	Harlan	None	None	C.C.N.D. Ill.	reversed
Katzenberger v. City of Aberdeen	172 (1887)	Waite	None	None	N.D. Miss.	affirmed
Laidly v. Huntington	179 (1887)	Waite	None	None	D.W. Va.	reversed
Burlington, Cedar Rapids and Northern Railway Company v. Dunn	182 (1887)	Waite	None	None	Minn.	case advanced
Estes and Doan v. Gunter	183 (1887)	Waite	None	None	N.D. Miss.	dismissed
Barron v. Burnside	186 (1887)	Blatchford	None	None	Iowa	reversed
McConihay v. Wright	201 (1887)	Matthews	None	None	D.W. Va.	affirmed
Francklyn v. A. & W. Sprague Manufacturing Company	215 (1887)	Bradley	None	None	C.C.D.R.I.	affirmed
City of Fargo v. Stevens	230 (1887)	Miller	None	None	Mich.	reversed
Covington Stockyards Company v. Keith	248 (1887)	Waite	None	None	C.C.D. Ky.	stay denied
Penn v. Calhoun	251 (1887)	Waite	None	None	C.C.S.D. Ill.	affirmed
Menard v. Goggan	253 (1887)	Waite	None	None	C.C.E.D. Tex.	reversed
United States v. Phillips	254 (1887)	Waite	None	None	C.C.W.D. Tex.	dismissed
Cleveland Rolling Mill Company v. Rhodes	255 (1887)	Gray	None	None	C.C.N.D. Ill.	reversed
Hinckley v. Pittsburgh Bessemer Steel Company	264 (1887)	Blatchford	None	None	C.C.N.D. Ill.	affirmed
United States v. Le Bris	278 (1887)	Waite	None	None	C.C.D. Minn.	certification
Parkinson v. United States	281 (1887)	Waite	None	None	C.C.D. Nev.	reversed
Church v. Kelsey	282 (1887)	Waite	None	None	Pa.	affirmed
Louisiana National Bank v. Whitney	284 (1887)	Waite	None	None	C.C.E.D. La.	dismissed
Dugger v. Tayloe	286 (1887)	Waite	None	None	Ala.	affirmed
Thatcher Heating Company v. Burtis	286 (1887)	Matthews	None	None	C.C.S.D.N.Y.	affirmed
Minneapolis Agricultural and Mechanical Association v. Canfield	295 (1887)	Matthews	None	None	C.C.D. Minn.	affirmed
Huiskamp Brothers v. Moline Wagon Company	310 (1887)	Blatchford	None	None	C.C.W.D. Mo.	reversed
Maxwell Land-Grant Case	325 (1887)	Miller	None	None	C.C.D. Colo.	affirmed
Fisher v. Kelsey	383 (1887)	Harlan	None	None	C.C.E.D. Mo.	affirmed
Lehigh Water Company v. Borough of Easton	388 (1887)	Harlan	None	None	Pa.	affirmed
Noonan v. Caledonia Gold Mining Company	393 (1887)	Field	None	None	Sup. Ct. Terr. Dakota	affirmed
Winslow, Lanier and Company v. Nash	404 (1887)	Waite	None	None	C.C.N.D. Ohio	affirmed
Laughlin v. Mitchell	411 (1887)	Blatchford	None	None	C.C.S.D. Miss.	affirmed
Carson v. Dunham	421 (1887)	Waite	None	None	C.C.D.S.C.	affirmed
Milwaukee and Northern Railway v. Brooks Locomotive Works	430 (1887)	Matthews	None	None	C.C.E.D. Wis.	affirmed
Ouachita Packet Company v. Aiken and Company	444 (1887)	Bradley	None	None	C.C.E.D. La.	affirmed
Albany and Rensselaer Company v. Lundberg	451 (1887)	Gray	None	None	C.C.S.D.N.Y.	reversed
Boynton v. Ball	457 (1887)	Miller	None	None	Ill.	reversed
The John H. Pearson	469 (1887)	Waite	None	None	C.C.D. Mass.	reversed
Carpenter v. Washington and Georgetown Railroad Company	474 (1887)	Miller	None	None	Sup. Ct. D.C.	affirmed
Bragg v. Fitch	478 (1887)	Bradley	None	None	C.C.D. Conn.	reversed
McCoy v. Nelson	484 (1887)	Blatchford	None	None	C.C.D. Colo.	reversed
Wright v. Roseberry	488 (1887)	Field	None	None	Cal.	reversed
Robinson v. Anderson	522 (1887)	Waite	None	None	C.C.D. Cal.	affirmed
Wilson's Executor v. Deen	525 (1887)	Field	None	None	C.C.S.D.N.Y.	reversed
Stanley v. Albany County	535 (1887)	Field	None	None	C.C.N.D.N.Y.	affirmed
Frost v. Spitley	552 (1887)	Gray	None	None	C.C.D. Neb.	reversed
Metropolitan Railroad Company v. Moore	558 (1887)	Matthews	None	None	Sup. Ct. D.C.	reversed
McGowan Pump Company v. American Pressed Tan Bark Company	575 (1887)	Blatchford	None	None	C.C.S.D. Ohio	affirmed
Hartranft, Collector of Customs for the District of Philadelphia v. J.H. Wiegmann and Son	609 (1887)	Blatchford	None	None	C.C.E.D. Pa.	affirmed
Hartranft, Collector of Customs for the District of Philadelphia v. Winters	616 (1887)	Blatchford	None	None	C.C.E.D. Pa.	affirmed
Snow v. Lake Shore and Michigan Southern Railway Company	617 (1887)	Matthews	None	None	C.C.N.D.N.Y.	affirmed
Peninsular Iron Company v. Stone	631 (1887)	Waite	None	None	C.C.S.D. Iowa	reversed
Lawrence v. Morgan's Railroad and Steamship Company	634 (1887)	Waite	None	None	C.C.E.D. La.	affirmed
New Jersey Steamboat Company v. Brockett	637 (1887)	Harlan	None	None	C.C.N.D.N.Y.	affirmed
