= United States v. Cotton =

- Supreme Court of the United States

Argued April 15, 2002 Decided May 20, 2002
- Full case name: United States v. Leonard Cotton, et al.
- Docket no.: 01-687
- Citations: 535 U.S. 625 (more)
- Argument: Oral argument
- Opinion announcement: Opinion announcement

Holding
- The court held that the omission from a federal indictment of a fact that enhances the statutory maximum sentence does not justify a Court of Appeals' vacating the enhanced sentence even if the defendant offered no objection at the trial court

Court membership
- Chief Justice William Rehnquist Associate Justices John P. Stevens · Sandra Day O'Connor; Antonin Scalia · Anthony Kennedy; David Souter · Clarence Thomas; Ruth Bader Ginsburg · Stephen Breyer

Case opinion
- Majority: Rehnquist, joined by unanimous

Laws applied
- Controlled Substances Act
- This case overturned a previous ruling or rulings
- Ex parte Bain (1887)

United States v. Cotton, 535 U.S. 625 (2002), is a United States Supreme Court case that held the omission of a fact in a federal indictment that would enhance the maximum sentence is not a jurisdictional error and thus is not justification for a vacation of the sentence.

== Background ==
Leonard Cotton was a drug dealer from Baltimore, Maryland who was charged by a federal grand jury with conspiracy to possess and conspiracy to possess with intent to distribute crack cocaine. The prosecution did not state the quantity of drugs in the indictment, however the court later found Cotton responsible for 1.5 kg (53 ounces) of cocaine.

Under federal sentencing guidelines, the maximum sentence for a conviction without a specified quantity is twenty years imprisonment. The Court of Appeals vacated the sentence on the grounds of a jurisdictional error by the amounts not being included in the grand jury indictments.

The United States was represented by Deputy Solicitor General Michael Dreeben.

== Decision ==
The court ruled unanimously 9-0 in favour of the United States. The opinion read as follows:

The fairness, integrity, and public reputation of the judicial system depends on meting out to those inflicting the greatest harm on society the most severe punishments. The real threat then to the "fairness, integrity, and public reputation of judicial proceedings" would be of respondents despite the overwhelming and uncontroverted evidence that they were involved in a vast drug conspiracy were to receive a sentence prescribed for those committing less substantial offenses because of an error that was never objected to in the Trial Court.

— Chief Justice William Rehnquist, (quoting R. Traynor, The Riddle of Harmless Error 50 (1970)), United States v. Cotton

This ruling in part overturned Ex parte Bain, 121 U.S 1 (1887).
