= West Africa Coast Initiative =

The West Africa Coast Initiative is an attempt from the United Nations to combat drug trafficking and transnational organized crime in West Africa. Initially,

- Guinea-Bissau
- Ivory Coast
- Liberia
- Sierra Leone

where $1 billion worth of cocaine is trafficked annually, are the first to accept and join the initiative; perhaps Guinea will join later. In some nations in the area, which are amongst the poorest in the world, drug trafficking profits actually outweigh the GDP. The Initiative will cover law enforcement, intelligence gathering, border management and corruption, among other crime prevention elements.

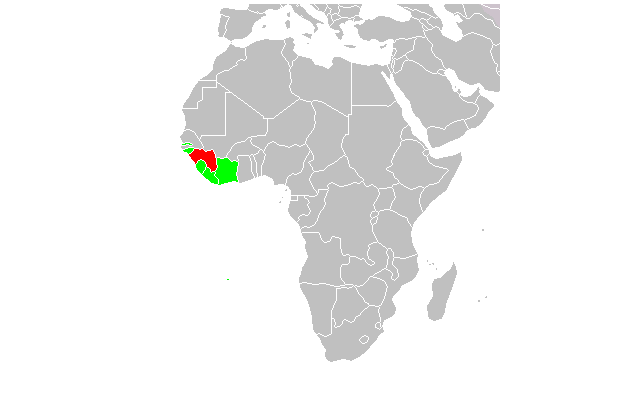
Green = Participants. Red = Potential Participants

== Plans ==
The initiative will address and resolve poorly defined national boundaries, and attempt to stop corruption, as both of these conditions make it easy for traffickers to smuggle their goods. Other items covered by the initiative include the stop of illegal toxic waste exports from Europe. The revenue from 45,000,000 fake anti-malarial pills, worth nearly $450 million, is greater than Guinea-Bissau’s GDP, while profits generated by cigarette smuggling, with a $775 million price tag, are more than Gambia’s entire GDP.

The UN has appealed for short-term technical and financial assistance to West Africa to help the region regain control of its air, sea and land space, and views long-term development assistance as the best safeguard against narcotics-trafficking and the creation of drug-dependent economies. Oil theft, or “bunkering”, in the Niger Delta is a key driver of pollution, as well as political instability, and the West Africa Coast Initiative will provide technical assistance to address it. In Nigeria, 55 million barrels of oil a year (a tenth of their entire production) are lost through theft and smuggling. Oil bunkering is a source of pollution, corruption, and revenue for insurgents and criminal groups, particularly in the Niger Delta.

== Partner organizations ==
The West Africa Coast Initiative is a collaboration of the

- UN Office on Drugs and Crime (UNODC)
- The UN Department of Peacekeeping Operations (DPKO)
- The UN Department of Political Affairs/UN Office for West Africa (DPA/UNOWA)
- Economic Community of West African States (ECOWAS) and
- Interpol.

== Other information ==
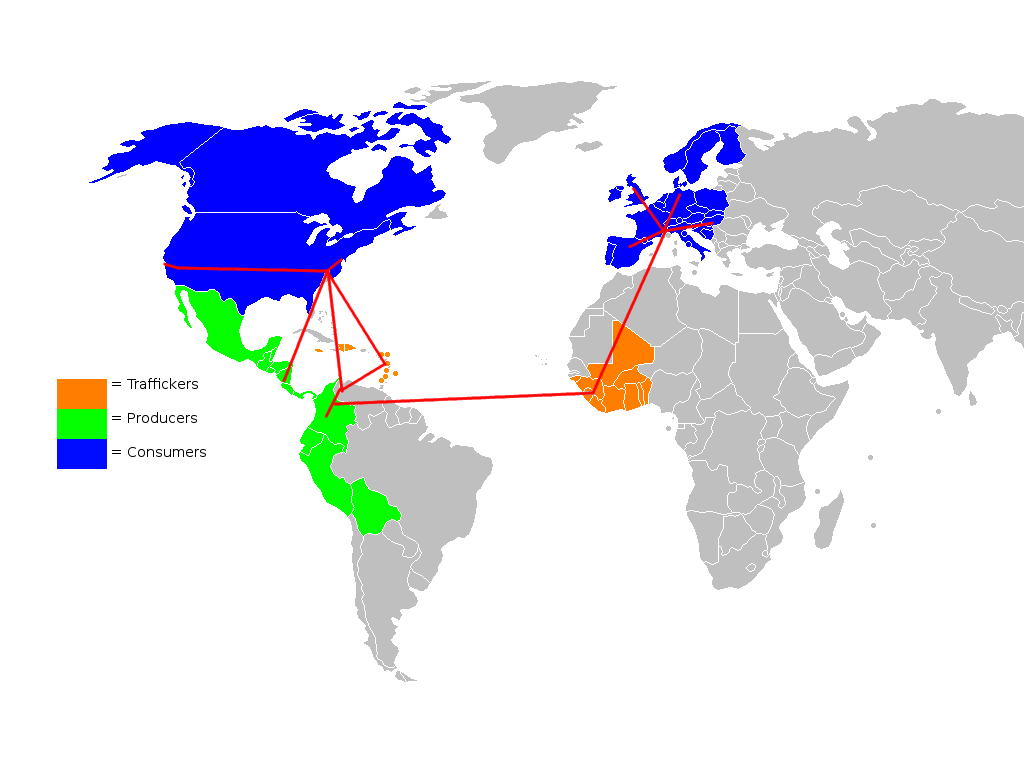
According to the UNODC, organized crime in West Africa is beginning to subside.

Only the major trading routes are shown, but there are many more in different areas in the world for different drugs. This map only shows the trading routes of cocaine, the most frequently trafficked drug in West Africa.

== See also ==
- Illegal fishing in Africa
- Drug trade in West Africa
- East African drug trade
- West Africa Commission on Drugs
- Illegal drug trade in Latin America
- Maritime drug trafficking in Latin America
- United Nations Commission on Narcotic Drugs
