= GRETA =

Council of Europe human rights group

- Council of Europe flag, 1953
- Company type: Monitoring mechanism
- Headquarters: Strasbourg
- Members: 10-15 independent and impartial experts
- Website: www.coe.int/en/web/anti-human-trafficking/greta

The Group of Experts on Action against Trafficking in Human Beings, more commonly known as GRETA, is the monitoring mechanism on human trafficking established by the Council of Europe Convention on Action against Trafficking in Human Beings in Article 36. It stipulates that GRETA can have from 10 to 15 members of independent and impartial experts from a variety of backgrounds. They have been chosen from amongst nationals of the States Parties to the Convention and are known for their competence and professional experience in the areas covered by the Convention; the term of office is four years, renewable once. The current composition of GRETA reflects a gender and geographical balance.

The Group is responsible for the monitoring and evaluation of the implementation of the Convention by the Parties, following a procedure divided in rounds. At the beginning of each round, GRETA defines autonomously the provisions to be monitored and determines the most appropriate means to carry out the evaluation, being guided by the Rules of Procedure for Evaluating Implementation of the Convention. In addition, GRETA regularly publishes general reports on its activities.

== History ==
The Convention was adopted by the Committee of Ministers of the Council of Europe on 3 May 2005 and entered into force on 1 February 2008. GRETA held its first meeting at the Council of Europe in Strasbourg from 24 to 27 February 2009. The meeting elected, for a first term of office of two years, a president and two vice-presidents.

The 10th anniversary of the entry into force of the Council of Europe Convention on Action against Trafficking in Human Beings was celebrated with the conference: "Ten years of implementation of the Convention on Action against Trafficking in Human Beings: impact and challenges ahead". It was held on 22 May 2018 at the Palais de l’Europe in Strasbourg, France. The conference brought together some 180 participants, including national anti-trafficking co-ordinators and rapporteurs, civil society representatives, survivors of human trafficking, representatives of international organizations, academia and business.

=== Legislation on Human Trafficking ===
There are three main legal instruments on Human Trafficking, one of which lead to the creation of GRETA:

1. The United Nations General Assembly on 15 November 2000 adopted a resolution that established the Convention against Transnational Organized Crime. The Convention had three supplementary protocols:

- Protocol to Prevent, Suppress and Punish Trafficking in Persons, especially Women and Children.
- Protocol against the Smuggling of Migrants by Land, Sea and Air.
- Protocol against the Illicit Manufacturing and Trafficking in Firearms.

2. The Council of Europe Convention on Action against Trafficking in Human Beings that established GRETA as the monitoring mechanism on Human Trafficking;

3. The Directive 2011/36/EU of the European Parliament and of the Council of 5 April 2011 on preventing and combating trafficking in human beings and protecting its victims.

== Structure ==
GRETA is composed of 15 independent members and impartial experts, who are selected by the Committee of the Parties for four years. The composition of GRETA consists of one president, two vice presidents, and thirteen experts.

The GRETA members are elected according to the Rules on the election procedure, which stipulates that the members "must have recognised competence in the fields of human rights, of assistance and protection of victims or of action against trafficking in human beings, or professional experience in the areas covered by the Convention. They must serve in their individual capacity, be independent and impartial, and be available to serve GRETA effectively".

The candidates are nominated by the States party to the Convention.

== Objective ==
GRETA's main objective is to evaluate the implementation of the Council of Europe Convention on Action against Trafficking in Human Beings by the parties, following a procedure divided in five parts as established by the Rules of Procedure for Evaluating Implementation of the Convention.

== Rules of Procedure for Evaluating Implementation of the Convention ==
The Rules of procedure for evaluating implementation of the Council of Europe Convention on Action against Trafficking in Human Beings by the parties were adopted on 17 June 2009 and amended on 21 November 2014; they finally entered into force on 1 January 2015.

They provided a specific structure to the evaluation mechanism, dividing it into five parts:

PART I: Evaluation Procedure; it's divided in rounds and the duration of each evaluation round shall be four years, unless otherwise decided by GRETA. The Group selects the specific provisions of the Convention on which each evaluation round shall be based.

PART II: Means of evaluation; for each evaluation round GRETA shall prepare a questionnaire on the implementation by the parties and it shall be public. The parties then respond to the questionnaire within the time-limit set by GRETA. The Group may decide to address the questionnaire or any other request for information to specific non-governmental organizations, other relevant organizations and members of civil society of the parties, which shell be active in the field of action against trafficking in human beings.

Subsidiarily to the information submitted in writing, GRETA may decide to carry out a country visit to the party concerned if it considers it necessary to complement this information or to evaluate the practical implementation of the measures taken.

PART III: Reports and conclusions; GRETA appoints Rapporteurs for each evaluating report. It consists of a descriptive part, an analytical part and conclusions. The draft report shall be examined, discussed and approved by GRETA in plenary, then transmitted to the party concerned for comments, to be provided within the time-limit set by GRETA.

The Group shall adopt its report and conclusions by 2/3 majority of the votes cast and then transmit them to the party, which shall be invited to submit any final comments within a month of adoption. GRETA's report and conclusions, together with eventual comments by the party concerned, shall be made public, at the expiry of the time-limit of one month to make comments, and sent to the Committee of the Parties.

PART IV: Information Technology; to contribute to the efficient functioning of the monitoring mechanism and to facilitate the work of stakeholders involved, information technology shall be used at every step of the procedure for evaluating the implementation of the Convention by the parties.

PART V: Amendments; it's specified that these rules may be amended by decision taken by a majority of the members of GRETA.

== Monitoring activities ==
According to the Internal rules of procedure, the monitoring is conducted in accordance with the procedure laid down in article 38 of the Convention and the Rules on the evaluation procedure and by GRETA's members. Annual reports are submitted to the Committee of the Parties and the Committee of Ministers.

As of January 2025, GRETA has produced 13 general reports on its activities, each covering distinct periods of time.

Apart from obtaining information from civil society, GRETA also conducts country monitoring activities; in this framework GRETA evaluates the measures taken by the parties (according to Article 36, paragraph 1 of the Convention). Therefore, GRETA designs and develops questionnaires, assesses and evaluates works of countries. The answers are submitted by the countries when requested by GRETA; the Group can also request additional information after receiving the questionnaire.

=== Other activities ===
GRETA helds activities in order to promote a better understanding and implementation of its reports and conclusions. Round-tables proposed to all of the countries evaluated by GRETA are a means to discuss the implementation of GRETA's recommendations since 2012. Other activities are conferences, capacity building, and meetings of National Coordinators.

== Criticism ==
According to the study conducted by Conny Rijken (INTERVICT, Tilburg University), GRETA does not comprehensively and consistently address child specific needs in accordance with the Convention, for example, as regards to children who are mentally less gifted but are able to function in society to a certain extent, especially young girls with limited capacities seem to be at heightened risk; GRETA, however, does not sufficiently focus on the needs of this group in the first evaluation round. It is also stated that GRETA should reinforce addressing attention to male victims in terms of assistance and protection measures and of awareness raising. In a broader perspective, according to Rijken, GRETA could/should:

- ask questions regarding how labour exploitation has been defined in national laws as the definition of labour exploitation needs to be further studied;
- be more consistent in how it evaluates reflection and recovery period for illegally residing migrants;
- use experience of other international monitoring bodies in order to ensure transparency in its evaluation criteria regarding recent developments in the States' obligations;
- follow the structure of the Convention on the Action against Trafficking in Human Beings;
- explain what GRETA expects from States regarding human rights based approach, with an explanation that only if States have implemented the Convention in line with all Convention obligations, it can claim it has implemented a human rights-based approach.

According to the research conducted by La Strada International regarding the first round of evaluations by GRETA, (i) when NGOs received questionnaires they wanted to be instructed what was expected from them in order to provide input; (ii) during country visits, there were not enough time reserved to discuss all the issues NGOs wanted to talk about.
