= Human trafficking in South Sudan =

Human trafficking in South Sudan remains a pressing human rights concern, driven by years of conflict, displacement, and economic instability. The country is both a source and destination for trafficking victims, with vulnerable groups including women, children, and migrants facing exploitation for forced labor, sexual abuse, and, in some cases, military recruitment.

The ongoing crisis in South Sudan has displaced millions of people, making them especially vulnerable to trafficking networks. Internally displaced persons (IDPs) and refugees often find themselves in precarious situations, where traffickers exploit their desperation. Victims are frequently forced to work in agriculture, construction, or domestic settings, sometimes under harsh or abusive conditions. Women and girls are particularly at risk of sexual exploitation, especially in urban areas or along migration routes. Some reports point to involvement or negligence by law enforcement officials in these abuses.

Another persistent problem is the use of child soldiers by both government and non-state armed groups. Boys are recruited or coerced into combat roles, while girls are often subjected to forced marriage or sexual slavery under the guise of being "wives" to soldiers. Migrants passing through South Sudan from neighboring countries also face risks, as some are trafficked en route or stranded without support.

Several factors contribute to the prevalence of trafficking in South Sudan. The legal system remains weak, with limited capacity to investigate and prosecute trafficking crimes. Poverty, lack of education, and ongoing insecurity make it difficult to implement effective preventive measures. Although South Sudan acceded to the United Nations Convention against Transnational Organized Crime (UNTOC) in October 2023 and began drafting an anti-trafficking bill in early 2024, enforcement remains limited.

The country continues to rank in "Tier 3" of the U.S. Department of State's annual Trafficking in Persons Report, which indicates that the government does not meet the minimum standards for combating trafficking and is not making significant efforts to do so.

Despite these challenges, several international and local organizations are working to address the issue. Agencies such as the International Organization for Migration (IOM) and the United Nations Office on Drugs and Crime (UNODC) offer support in the form of training, institutional development, and victim assistance. Local non-governmental organizations are also involved in victim rescue, rehabilitation, and awareness campaigns.

Still, many obstacles remain. Public understanding of human trafficking is low, and survivors often face stigma when trying to reintegrate into their communities. The broader humanitarian crisis in South Sudan makes it difficult to prioritize and sustain anti-trafficking initiatives.

== Prosecution ==
Certain forms of trafficking has been termed as criminal offence in South Sudan's legal framework but enforcement remains minimal. The 2008 Penal code, 2008 Child Act, and 2018 Labor Act prohibit child trafficking, forced labor, and the recruitment of children for armed conflict, prescribing penalties ranging from five to fourteen years’ imprisonment.

For the eleventh consecutive year, the government did not report any prosecutions or convictions related to human trafficking. Investigations into trafficking cases were also lacking, and there were no reported efforts to address official complicity, despite persistent concerns about corruption and the involvement of security forces in the unlawful recruitment of child soldiers.

Some training and awareness activities were conducted in collaboration with international organizations, but knowledge of trafficking remained limited among law enforcement and judicial officials. Customary courts handled most cases due to limited capacity in statutory courts, and the specialized Gender-Based Violence and Juvenile Court continued to operate, though its role in trafficking cases was not clearly documented.

== Protection ==
The government of South Sudan continued to demonstrate limited efforts to protect victims of human trafficking. No formal procedures were reported for the identification or referral of victims to care, and no trafficking victims were officially identified or assisted during the reporting period. In cooperation with an international organization, authorities reported the demobilization of 11 child soldiers, a decrease from the 20 reported in the previous year.

The government held stakeholder meetings on child protection and conducted limited training for officials on legal frameworks relevant to children in armed conflict . However, significant barriers remained. Victims, particularly those subjected to sex trafficking, were often deterred from reporting crimes due to social stigma and fear of punitive action. In the absence of formal screening processes, authorities likely detained unidentified victims, including children.

The government did not provide legal alternatives to removal for foreign victims facing potential hardship or retaliation in their home countries. Additionally, no victim-witness support mechanisms were available to facilitate participation in legal proceedings related to trafficking crimes.
