= Violence against women in Belarus =

Map of Belarus in Europe

Violence against women in Belarus is a significant issue in Belarusian society. Belarus is ranked 29th on the Gender Inequality Index and 36th on the Global Gender Gap Index. Despite this, the government of Belarus has been criticised by the United Nations and human rights activists for its active role in suppressing women's rights and perpetuating violence against women.

== Domestic violence ==
The government of Belarus does not maintain a record of domestic violence incidents. According to Amnesty International, the level of domestic violence in Belarus remains unknown due to underreporting. The Belarusian government stated in 2004 that 30 percent of women in the country had experienced domestic violence, while a 2001 report by the United Nations Development Fund for Women "concluded that 3.9 per cent of the women questioned in Belarus had been struck on the head or pushed frequently and that 20 per cent had been subjected to such treatment less frequently." Amnesty International has also claimed that the system of reporting domestic violence is flawed, citing the risks women face of losing parental rights and their children.

Belarusian President Alexander Lukashenko has resisted efforts to criminalise domestic violence, saying of a 2018 draft bill, "It's just nonsense taken from the West, [...] We will proceed exclusively from our own interests, our Belarusian Slavic traditions, and our life experience," and citing his own frequent usage of physical punishment against his eldest son. The Belarusian Orthodox Church and the Catholic Church in Belarus have both spoken out against proposals to criminalise domestic violence, with Tadeusz Kondrusiewicz (former archbishop of Minsk–Mohilev) calling on Lukashenko to "be guided by national interests and spiritual values of the Belarusian people and not to follow disastrous secularist trends and gender ideology leading to the destruction of traditional family." Non-governmental organizations supporting domestic violence victims have been liquidated by the Belarusian government as part of a broader crackdown on activism in the aftermath of the 2020–2021 Belarusian protests.

== Rape ==
Rape is common in Belarus: in 2004, over 20% of Belarusian women reported having been sexually abused at least once. As of 2006, spousal rape remains legal in Belarus. Forensic and police treatment of rape victims remains outdated, and according to Amnesty International and other non-governmental organizations, many forensic doctors are not adequately trained in identifying cases of rape.

== Human trafficking ==
Most victims of human trafficking in Belarus are women; between 2017 and 2021 the Ministry of Internal Affairs of Belarus identified 753 human trafficking victims, of whom 90% were female. Though it has ratified the United Nations Convention Against Transnational Organized Crime, the United Nations in 2009 claimed that Belarus was "on the verge of occupying the unenviable status of being a source, transit and destination country," though it also expressed positive views on efforts by the Belarusian government to fight human trafficking.

As a result of the 2021–2022 Belarus–European Union border crisis, the United States and the Council of Europe have accused the government of Belarus of actively aiding human trafficking, with GRETA citing the Belarusian government's ambivalence towards the matter amidst the mass transit of refugees into Belarus.

== State violence against women ==
According to a 2021 report by the United Nations, women in particular have been subject to suppressions during the 2020–2021 Belarusian protests, with female members of the Belarusian opposition being subject to enforced disappearances and torture. In a 2023 address on human rights abuses during the 2020–2021 Belarusian protests, Nada al-Nashif (Deputy High Commissioner for Human Rights) further revealed that over 100 cases of sexual and gender-based violence (including rape) were confirmed by UN authorities, with 36 of these cases being against women. Amnesty International has further accused the Belarusian government of threatening female protesters with sexual violence and taking their children into state custody. Belarusian women have also been the target of gunfire by security forces, and have been frequently detained for minor infractions and placed in overcrowded cells where they lack access to basic amenities such as food or water.
