= Drug trade in West Africa =

In the late 1950s and early 1960s, the drug trade in West Africa rapidly expanded amid dramatic increases in US and European demand for cocaine, cannabis, and other drugs. This resulted in the expansion of two distinct trade routes, both of which went through West Africa. One route exported domestically produced cannabis from West Africa to South Africa, Europe, and Asia. The other trade route moved cocaine from Latin America and heroin from Afghanistan and Southeast Asia to Europe and the United States. In both of these routes, drug traffickers took advantage of trading networks created by Malian and Berber traders in colonial times to move drugs through the region, as well as West Africa's broader geographical location as an intermediate stop from Latin America and Southwest Asia to Europe and the United States. This was due in part to West Africa's badly policed borders, endemic corruption, and economic inequalities.

At first, the drugs were only smuggled in small quantities; but as time progressed and the demand for drugs kept rising, countries in West Africa — notably Nigeria, Ghana, and Guinea-Bissau — were entrusted with cocaine loads as large as 135 to 200 tonnes (according to the UNODC). Since then West Africa has become a key component of the drug trading world, with increase in both variety and number of drugs trafficked through West Africa, and the expansion of the drug trade from West Africa to other parts of the continent. International pressure and prioritization by regional governments has fuelled the rise of drug control organizations in many West African countries, shifting the focal point of political, economic, and social domestic action.

== History ==
According to historian Emmanuel Akyeampong, cannabis products in West Africa existed before the mid-twentieth century. In 1934 colonial authorities were still testing the cultivation of the coca plant in Calabar and other places in Nigeria. By the mid-1950s police were arresting some Nigerian farmers for growing and selling small amounts of cannabis, which were being shipped to Europe and the United States. While this was going on, Nigerian cannabis smokers were buying some imported marijuana from South African and Belgian Congo dealers.

The first documented use of West Africa as a smuggling post was in 1952, when US officials noticed that a Lebanese syndicate was hiding heroin in West Africa in order to avoid getting caught by police and to avoid the scrutiny of officers on the European trade route.

West Africa's rise as a major drug smuggling transit point starts at around the 1960s, when the Beatles and Swinging London were popular, and young men and women in the UK and other parts of Europe wanted illegal drugs. Marijuana was particularly high in demand, and reports of the time stated that marijuana grown in West Africa was being exported from Nigeria to Europe in large quantities. The drug trade became a problem, and the Nigerian government issued a decree stating that anyone found guilty exporting cannabis would get a ten-year jail term. Until the 1980s, many Nigerians and some Ghanaian traders would go out and make trades on their own terms and conditions. The dealers went to places like Latin America or Asia and bought many small packages of drugs (usually cocaine or heroin), and then had couriers go out and sell their property. It has been speculated that the origins of mass drug exports started with West African students living in the EU and US who failed to receive payments of their study grants, and were then hired by Nigerian naval officers in training who were stationed in India to deliver the heroin they bought, and bring it back to the countries where they resided.

After 1982 the US and Europe noticed a rise in Nigerian drug traders in their countries. The US arrested 21 Nigerians for drug offenses, and then many more thereafter. In Europe an official of the West German Interior Ministry reportedly said the following year that Hamburg, Germany was importing a serious amount of drugs from West Africa, including one and a half tonnes of a mystery drug (presumably marijuana) from Ghana.

== Demand ==
From 1998 to 2009, cocaine consumption doubled in Europe, and as a result Latin American drug cartels and West African dealers formed an alliance in order to facilitate drug transportation by taking advantage of the airplanes and boats that enter and leave the coast of West Africa. Drugs were then spread through North America and Europe through localized West African ethnic communities that had the tools and resources to traffic drugs along established networks.

Domestic demand for illicit drugs varies for different regions and populations. Use of cheaper substances, like marijuana and a cannabis rooted drink called akpeteshie, falls heavily on working-class and poorer populations. In Ghana, groups like miners, agricultural laborers, and sailors use these substances as a way to cope with the demands of difficult lifestyles or grueling days of labor. Domestic demand for harder drugs such as cocaine and heroin, as well as Mandrax and amphetamines, was traditionally viewed as to be found only among wealthier populations. However, falling prices of more expensive illicit drugs as well as expanding methods of consumption have made such substances more readily accessible to working-class West Africans, particularly in city centers. The powerful energizing effects of substances like cocaine and amphetamines have made them more attractive to laborers with long, exhaustive workdays, as well as students who spend long nights studying. As a result of expanding trends in globalization in recent years, demand for substances, especially harder drugs, has spread to tourists and short-term residents of many West African countries.

The expansive drug trafficking routes through West Africa that fuel this high demand are sustained in some part by complicit governmental forces. Unlike routes from Latin America or Asia that have gained growing amounts of attention from international drug enforcers, traders face relatively fewer obstacles in trafficking illicit substances through West Africa. Corruption and political relationships to underground economies fuel a "shadow state" system, where money from drug trafficking funds government actors in their campaigns and financial holdings, and politicians gain power and influence based on how they can wield funds from drug trafficking. In this sense, capital and governmental resources generated from the drug trade are also in high demand.

=== Drug abuse ===
New markets for illicit substances and a growing acceptance of hard drugs has led to cases of drug abuse throughout West Africa. The United Nations found that in the 1980s and 1990s, drug consumption increased dramatically in youth populations and among the urban poor. Whereas before drug traffickers transported drugs through the West Africa, they now realized they could save money by selling their products within the region. As a result, countries central to West African drug routes—Nigeria, Ivory Coast, Ghana, Sierra Leone, and Guinea-Bissau—have all seen a rise in domestic drug consumption and abuse. In countries like Nigeria, there are few government health and rehabilitation services available, leaving addicts and their families to deal with adverse health effects and the socioeconomic consequences on their own.

As the locus of concern for drug control organizations has shifted to the supply of drugs to Western countries, less attention has been given to domestic demand and consumption. Most West African countries do not have sufficient services or policies put in place to properly run substance abuse and local anti-drug campaigns. Controlling the flow of drugs out of the region has taken priority over regulating drug trafficking within West African countries.

Increasing rates of substance abuse have intensified other issues within West Africa, including the spread of HIV and AIDS, higher rates of prostitution, and larger urban poor populations who are economically immobilized by a reliance on drugs. Drug abuse within families has shown lasting cross-generational effects on urban youth and catalyzed a quicker spread of drug addiction along with higher rates of depression and anxiety. The Casamance conflict in Senegal is an example of how the growing domestic demand for substances has additionally created financial opportunity for insurgent groups within the region, leading to further political instability.

== Supply ==
Due to the rising demand of illegal drugs and the rising profits from illicit drugs following the mid-1980s, West Africans branched out of Africa and created outposts in big cities all across the world in order to establish effective drug trading networks. An estimated quarter to two-thirds of the cocaine coming from Latin America to Europe passes through West Africa.

In terms of domestic drug cultivation, Nigeria and Ghana remain the largest producers of cannabis in West Africa. Cultivation takes place largely in partnership with local farmers, who plant crops such as okra and tomatoes along with the marijuana plants to reduce the risk of seizure of the plants or government destruction of their farms. Cannabis is also cultivated in remote areas or under cover of forestry to conceal the plants from authorities.

Growing fears about the expanding supply of illicit drugs in West Africa has created a focus on control of this growing supply as the preceding goal, over other issues such as drug use within the West African region and public health issues. Supply-centered drug control policies have negatively impacted different groups in West Africa that have experienced higher rates of demand for illicit substances with little to no government interference.

=== Transport ===
The World Drug Report stated, “The cocaine found in Africa originated mainly in Colombia and Peru and frequently transited through Brazil”. Heroin often travels through Southeast Asian regions, such as the Golden Triangle region of northern Thailand, and through Western Asian countries through a mix of overland routes and air transport by way of couriers. These substances are then transferred from West Africa to North America, Europe, and South Africa by employing direct transit routes and criminal network routes aided by the West African diaspora. In some cases, traffickers even used unsuspecting international travellers as couriers, by having them place unmarked bags in their luggage in exchange for payment.

Container ships and private yachts were originally used for transporting cocaine from Latin America to West Africa, but since overseas police began guarding the ocean more stringently, cartels started using second-hand cargo aircraft to deliver cocaine to West Africa. Airplanes can be easily obtained, and pilots willing to fly these planes are just as easy to hire. Due to West Africa's unreliable national radar networks and coverage, narco-flights are able to fly into the region without detection. Illegal drugs were smuggled into Europe from Guinea-Bissau using air freighters and commercial airliners that used “mules”, or human vessels, who would swallow condoms full of cocaine in order to bypass airline security.

Drugs are smuggled across West African countries using a variety of techniques. When traveling on overland routes, traders hide substances with other products such as charcoal, cocoa, and fruit, to conceal the smell and appearance at different police checkpoints. Products are also moved by way of taxis and individual vehicles during times when government posts and trade routes are unregulated, and the chance of detection is significantly lower. Lastly, drug traffickers will also pay law enforcement and border officials to move substances through land and sea routes freely and without punishment.

=== International Consequences ===
The US's enhanced border security along with the “war on drugs” in the 1970s and 1980s negatively impacted the Mexican drug cartel Los Zetas. This caused the Mexican drug cartel to branch out and seize control of a profitable smuggling route that goes through West Africa and ends up in Europe. The Mexican cartel's push into Europe is causing Colombian cartels to lose power in Europe. Colombia has been Europe's main source for cocaine, but since the capture and arrest of the cartels' leading figure in their supply routes, El Loco (Daniel Barrera Barrera), Colombian cartels have suffered great financial loss. Criminal networks from West Africa have, in turn, spread to other regions—namely South Africa. Certain individuals central to the drug trade in West Africa carried practices and organizations to the south of the continent, where transit costs and risk of detection are relatively lower and new markets exist for harder drugs.

Brazil and Venezuela have become major embarkation zones for illegal drugs that are headed for West Africa. Between 2005 and 2008 there were 46 metric tonnes of cocaine seized by police. This coincides with the Venezuelan government ceasing to work with the United States Drug Enforcement Administration (DEA). The lack of law enforcement in Venezuela, along with inadequate border control in both countries and insufficient coastline control in Brazil, allows the drug trade to thrive in the two countries and neighboring countries. Brazil and Venezuela are capable of shipping cocaine transnationally to West and South Africa due to the lack of security in both continents.

== Drug Control ==
The growing presence of both trafficking organizations operating on an international level and smaller-scale drug trafficking business operations in many West African countries has stimulated localized markets for a range of drugs. The local trade of imported cocaine and heroin has skyrocketed in recent years and, in some countries, has spread drug abuse to virtually every city. Within the last century, marijuana (primarily cultivated in its hashish form) has transitioned from a profitless drug to one that is sold locally and trafficked on the routes previously used for cocaine and heroin.

In the past, international organizations and governmental and nongovernmental groups established control measures against drug trafficking through a targeted lens. The main supply countries in the West African drug trade have historically put pressure on West African governments to institute punitive policies and practice harsher methods to control international routes. Related research has similarly focused on the number of arrests made or the amounts of drugs seized, rather than the more nuanced connections between drug trafficking and economic and political activity. This focus on arrests and seizures has been shown to have little effect on the size of the West African drug trade and has caused traffickers to simply employ new methods of subversion and concealment. This control methodology has, however, served to target small-scale cannabis growers and substance users, rather than larger traffickers that have the money and influence to avoid punishment.

The realized results of these enforcement policies have been stricter control at airports, seaports, and other borders in West African nations. International funding has been dispersed and relinquished in connection with the drug networks within countries in an attempt to crack down on corruption and government connections to drug traffickers. In countries like Nigeria, the death penalty was instituted as a way to severely punish those involved in the drug trade at any level and discourage any participation in the drug trade.

In Nigeria, this prioritization of strict drug control, exacerbated by patronage relationships between the National Drug Law Enforcement Agency and country leadership, has engendered a brutal and repressive internal drug war. These measures do not encompass the full effect of drug trafficking on West Africa, and ignore how trafficking has created a culture of drug consumption among certain communities and city centers.

=== Corruption and the Drug Trade ===
A driving factor in rapid growth of the drug trafficking network in West Africa has been deeply rooted corruption in many, if not all, West African countries. Many governmental organizations and politicians benefit from money embezzled through the drug trade and have little incentive to punish large-scale drug traffickers and criminal networks. At a more local level, drug traffickers pay border agents and law enforcement to pass substances through overland networks safely and at low risk. These negotiations and payments are done at little cost to trafficking groups as result of poverty and government debt that allows them to cheaply compensate corrupt government officials.

Civil wars, military coups, and other intergovernmental conflicts exacerbate corruption related to drug trafficking. Political actors in these unstable regimes exercise control of secondary, illegal markets to gain a tighter hold on power. In Guinea Bissau, military leaders that seized power under the pretense of reducing corruption have taken part in corrupt deals that facilitate the flow of drugs across the country's borders.

Facing mounting pressure from international institutions, some West African governments have created anti-corruption organizations to start reversing the trend of drug trafficking in their countries. Nigeria created both the Economic and Financial Crimes Commission and the Independent Corrupt Practices Commission to identify government officials tied to bribery and embezzlement in underground drug networks. These attempts at reducing corruption in Nigeria, as well as other West African countries, have largely been met with failure due to weak criminal justice systems and levels of corruption imbued in every level of government.

=== The Sahel ===
The Sahel has become a key hub for terrorism and transnational crime, with extremist groups increasingly relying on drug trafficking to fund their operations. According to the Global Terrorism Index (GTI), the region now accounts for over half of all terrorism-related deaths, with 3,885 fatalities in 2023 out of a global total of 7,555. The rise in violence is driven by the expansion of groups like ISIS-Sahel and Jama'at Nusrat al-Islam wal Muslimeen (JNIM), who compete for territorial control and impose strict Sharia-based governance. Weak governance, political instability, and military coups in Mali, Burkina Faso, Guinea, and Niger have further enabled these groups to thrive. A key source of their revenue is drug trafficking, particularly cocaine smuggling from South America to Europe, using the Sahel as a transit route. These networks operate alongside other illicit activities such as ransom kidnappings and illegal gold mining, creating a dangerous nexus of terrorism and organized crime. In response, some governments have turned to Russia and China for security support, relying on paramilitary groups like the Africa Corps (formerly Wagner), though with little success. The growing instability now threatens neighboring countries like Togo and Benin, raising fears of further regional destabilization.

=== Drug Policy Reform ===
In the scope of seeking new measures of control of the drug trade and reform of counter-drug measures, the African Union and West African Commission on Drugs have introduced policy measures that focus on shifting the focus of change from controlling the exports and trafficking of illicit drugs to combating drug use in West Africa, and reducing the internal consumption of drugs that have become more readily available as a result of the drug trade.

Several European countries and drug enforcement agencies have aimed to reduce the harm caused to users both in Africa and internationally. This shows a shift from older policies focused on eliminating the trade and consumption of illicit substances, in favour of trying to remedy their effects.

These changes have been realized through policy statements and initiatives that seek to strengthen research on the drug trade in West Africa, by improving data collection techniques and also by exploring other control methods outside of the current focus and other illicit drugs besides just cocaine and heroin. In response to the growing consumption within West Africa, the African Union and West African Commission on Drugs have also called for research on how best to treat drug addicts and substance abusers. From a reform standpoint, the objective of the organizations has been to recognize the violent and extrajudicial methods that have been used to control the drug trade in the past, and shift policy initiatives to instead facilitate control through researched and debated strategies.

== Locations in West Africa ==
=== Nigeria ===
- Local police and the United Nations Office on Drugs and Crime (UNODC) have noticed that the import, export, and traffic of many drugs including heroin, cannabis, and cocaine have been rising. The drugs originate from areas as far as Latin America and Afghanistan.
- The decline and subsequent break down of the oil industry, as well as new tariffs and restrictions on exported natural resources in the 1980s, incentivized many Nigerians to turn to the less restricted drug trade. Over time, this has led to a global presence of Nigerian criminal networks centered around the drug trade and the creation of Nigerian DTOs, or Drug Trade Organizations.
- Nigerian drug trafficking organizations are administered top down by drug barons who manage a mix of operators, or "strikers", who work as intermediaries in building foreign relationships, administering drug sales, and faking legal documentation. These strikers also recruit couriers, ensuring that they have little to no connection to the drug barons they work under.
- The reach of the international drug trade has had localized effects in Nigeria as well. As early as 1989, there were accounts of drug addiction centers in Nigeria that had a notably higher number of cases involving heroin or cocaine addiction. This trend is backed by anecdotal evidence of surges in adulterated cocaine and heroin in cities and urban centers throughout Nigeria and other West African Countries.
- Since the 1990s, Nigeria's drug control efforts have been identified as some of the most effective in the West African region, despite research that has shown mixed degrees of control. Nigerian drug agencies, led by the National Drug Law Enforcement Agency, have taken a larger role in working with other African countries in drug enforcement and playing a larger regional role. These Nigerian agencies are also known for their particularly punitive strategies in dealing with drug trafficking, with past extrajudicial executions of drug lords and attempts at completely eradicating cannabis. However, in the last ten years, government and domestic funding has decreased for the agencies that employ such strategies, implying a shift in methodology and an attempt at reform in Nigerian drug policy.
- The reputation of Nigeria as the source of international drug syndicates has incited gang violence and international violence against Nigerians who are mistakenly labeled as a part of Nigerian criminal networks. Detainment and death of alleged Nigerian drug dealers across the continent has led to health and human rights concerns.

=== Guinea-Bissau ===
- Since Guinea-Bissau used to be a Portuguese colony, the Portuguese do not require Bissau-Guineans visas in order to enter Portugal. This allows illegal drugs to be smuggled easily into Europe using “mules”, or human drug vessels.
- Guinea-Bissau's poverty makes illegal drug trading ideal in the country because the drug trade can earn the country an estimated $2 billion a year, which is nearly two times as much as Guinea-Bissau's GDP. In European cities the value of the cocaine and drugs could be as high as an estimated $20 billion.
- Guinea-Bissau's illegal international drug trade has led to an increase in criminal activity which has led to higher violence in the country.

=== Ghana ===
- Ghana was first exposed to cannabis through Ghanaian soldiers who came in contact with the substance in South Asia during World War II. Cultivation and consumption consequently spread quickly through larger cities such as Accra. Ghana is now the second largest West African producer of cannabis.
- Nigerian organizations and routes spread to Ghana in the early 1980s and quickly expanded as Nigerian drug traffickers began to be convicted and punished for drug trafficking and Ghana became a safer, alternative network. Many Ghanaians began as drug intermediaries or couriers in the region and quickly moved up to higher positions in criminal syndicates.
- Field research in Ghana has shown that the cannabis trade operates in way where product distributions are sold and transported in wholesale. Marijuana is bought from farmers of other crops and fruits and taken to other areas of Ghana and on to other countries like Gambia and Senegal.
- The Narcotics Control Board is the primary domestic drug enforcement agency and works to ensure detection of substances, drug searches and seizures, and sufficient cooperation with international organizations to make larger-scale seizures and arrests. The NCB has international approval for its drug enforcement policies, but many local Ghanaian police officers have a less reliable record and are known to take part in drug smuggling and consumption as one of the largest user groups.

== See also ==
- East African drug trade
- United Nations Office on Drugs and Crime
- United Nations Commission on Narcotic Drugs
