= Abu Trica =

Ghanaian businessman and alleged fraud suspect

Frederick Kumi
- Born: Frederick Kumi; Swedru, Ghana
- Status: On bail
- Other names: Abu Trica; Emmanuel Kojo Baah Obeng
- Occupations: Businessman (alleged); Internet fraud suspect
- Organization: Alleged international fraud network
- Criminal charges: Conspiracy to commit wire fraud; Conspiracy to commit money laundering
- Wanted by: United States of America
- Wanted since: 2025

Frederick Kumi popularly known as Abu Trica, is a Ghanaian businessman who was declared wanted by United States Department of Justice in connection with alleged international fraud and money laundering activities. He has been the subject of legal proceedings in Ghana and an extradition request from the United States.

== Early life ==
Abu Trica is from Swedru in the Central Region.

== Alleged fraud activities ==
According to prosecutors, Abu Trica is alleged to have been part of an international criminal network involved in romance fraud schemes targeting victims, particularly elderly individuals in the United States.

The alleged scheme reportedly involved the use of artificial intelligence tools to create fake identities and establish romantic relationships with victims via social media and online dating platforms. Victims were then persuaded to send money under false pretences, including medical emergencies, travel costs, and investment opportunities.

Investigators allege that Abu Trica played a role in facilitating the transfer of funds from victims in the United States to accomplices in Ghana and other jurisdictions. He was arrested on 11 December 2025 in Ghana during a joint operation involving Ghanaian authorities and the United States Federal Bureau of Investigation (FBI).

Following his arrest, he was arraigned before the Gbese District Court in Accra as part of extradition proceedings initiated by U.S. authorities.

== Legal proceedings ==
=== Arrest and detention ===
Abu Trica was arrested on 11 December 2025 by Ghanaian authorities following an extradition request from the United States, where he had been formally charged in connection with the alleged fraud network. He was subsequently remanded into custody by a district court in Ghana while legal proceedings were ongoing. Following court proceedings in 2026, Abu Trica was granted bail by the High Court in Accra. He was later re-arrested by the Narcotics Control Commission (NACOC) in connection with ongoing investigations.

=== Charges ===
Abu Trica is facing charges including conspiracy to commit wire fraud and conspiracy to commit money laundering.

=== Bail ===
In April 2026, the High Court in Accra granted Abu Trica bail in the sum of GH¢30 million with two sureties to be justified. The bail was granted after approximately four months in custody, following his arrest in December 2025.

=== Extradition ===
On 9 July 2026, Kumi was extradited to the United States to face trial on charges of conspiracy to commit wire fraud and money laundering, offences carrying a maximum sentence of 20 years' imprisonment if convicted. He has denied the allegations.

According to BBC News, Kumi's lawyer argued that the extradition proceeded before the court had delivered its decision and raised constitutional concerns. At the time of publication, the Ghanaian government had not publicly commented on the matter.
