= West Africa Commission on Drugs =

The West Africa Commission on Drugs was launched by the Kofi Annan Foundation in 2014. Olusegun Obasanjo chaired the commission.

Obasanjo urged strengthening law enforcement and refocussing efforts on "high-level criminals rather than the easy – and misleading – wins gained by arresting drug users and petty dealers."

It produced a report “Not Just in Transit: Drugs, the State and Society in West Africa” which was launched in Dakar, Senegal on 11 September 2018. The report urged West African governments to overhaul their drug laws to decriminalise personal use and prioritise treatment. Abuse of opioids, particularly Tramadol has become a major health crisis in the region.

The commission proposed a detailed Model Drug Law which would end all criminal penalties relating to personal drug use and possession. This would allow law enforcement efforts to focus on unauthorised drug production and trafficking offences.

It is suggested that Ghana may become the first Sub-Saharan country to decriminalise personal drug use and possession.

== See also ==
- Drug trade in West Africa
- East African drug trade
- Illegal drug trade in Latin America
- United Nations Office on Drugs and Crime
- United Nations Commission on Narcotic Drugs
