= Blue Heart Campaign =

Anti-trafficking program by the UNODC

- Logo of the Blue Heart Campaign
- Purpose: Anti-trafficking
- Parent organization: United Nations Office on Drugs and Crime
- Website: www.unodc.org/blueheart

The Blue Heart Campaign is an international anti-trafficking program started by the United Nations Office on Drugs and Crime (UNODC). Established in 1997, the UNODC supported countries in implementing three UN drug protocols. In 2000, after the UN General Assembly adopted the Protocol to Prevent, Suppress and Punish Trafficking in Persons, the UNODC became the "guardian" of that protocol and assumed the functions of fighting against human trafficking. The Blue Heart Campaign was launched in March 2009 by the Executive Director of the UNODC, Antonio Maria Costa, during his address to the World's Women's Conference meeting in Vienna. The campaign's symbol is a blue heart. The Blue Heart Campaign uses its website, as well as Facebook, Twitter, YouTube, and Flickr to communicate goals, objectives, and news with the public.

== Protocol to Prevent, Suppress and Punish Trafficking in Persons ==
The UN Protocol to Prevent, Suppress and Punish Trafficking in Persons, Especially Women and Children, which came into force on 25 December 2003, states that while there are rules and measures to combat the exploitation of persons, there is no universal instrument to combat all aspects of trafficking in persons. The protocol includes legislative provisions and protection, prevention and cooperation measures. To date, more than 147 countries have ratified and signed the protocol. However, according to the UNODC, "very few criminals are being brought to justice and most victims are never identified or assisted.

== Funding ==
To support the Blue Heart Campaign, the UN launched the UN Voluntary Trust Fund for Victims of Trafficking in Persons. The Fund was established following the adoption by the General Assembly in July 2010 of the UN Global Plan of Action to Combat Trafficking in Persons. The fund will also help Governments, as well as intergovernmental and non-governmental organizations, to protect and support victims of human trafficking so they can recover from their physical and psychological injuries.

== Trafficking in Persons Report ==
For the United States, the Trafficking in Persons (TIP) Report is the principal diplomatic tool to engage foreign governments on human trafficking. It is the world's most comprehensive resource of governmental anti-human trafficking efforts and represents an updated, global look at the nature and scope of trafficking in persons and the broad range of government actions to confront and eliminate it. The U.S. government uses the TIP Report to engage foreign governments in dialogues to advance anti-trafficking reforms and to combat trafficking and to target resources on prevention, protection, and prosecution programs. International organizations, foreign governments, and nongovernmental organizations use the report as a tool to examine where resources are most needed. Freeing victims, preventing trafficking, and bringing traffickers to justice are the ultimate goals of the report and of the U.S. Government's anti-human trafficking policy. In the TIP Report, the Department of State places each country onto one of three tiers based on the extent of their governments' efforts to comply with the "minimum standards for the elimination of trafficking" found in Section 108 of the Victims of Trafficking and Violence Protection Act (TVPA). While Tier 1 is the highest ranking, it does not mean that a country has no human trafficking problem. On the contrary, a Tier 1 ranking indicates that a government has acknowledged the existence of human trafficking, made efforts to address the problem, and complies with the TVPA's minimum standards. Each year, governments need to demonstrate appreciable progress in combating trafficking to maintain a Tier 1 ranking.

== National Slavery and Human Trafficking Prevention Month ==
On 31 December 2012 Barack Obama declared January the National Slavery and Human Trafficking Prevention Month. In his proclamation, President Obama explains that "trafficking networks operate both domestically and trans-nationally, and although abuses disproportionately affect women and girls, the victims of this ongoing global tragedy are men, women, and children of all ages. Around the world, we are monitoring the progress of governments in combating trafficking while supporting programs aimed at its eradication". On 29 December 2017, President Donald Trump proclaimed January 2018 as National Slavery and Human Trafficking Prevention Month.

== Involvement ==
Mexico was the first country in the world to join back in April 2010. Spain followed Mexico's example and joined the Campaign in June 2010, becoming the first European country to join. In April 2012, Portugal joined the list of countries supporting the campaign. It was launched by Teresa Morais, Secretary of State for Parliamentary Affairs and Equality, Manuel Albano, Portuguese National Rapporteur for Human Trafficking, and Pierre Lapaque, Chief of the UNODC Organized Crime Unit. Word about Blue Heart has spanned the globe and many organizations are getting involved. A student organization at the University of South Florida called N.I.T.E. (Necessary Improvements to Transform the Environment) participated in the campaign in February 2012 to support two fellow students that had survived human trafficking. In April 2009, the UK Human Trafficking Centre (UKHTC) and its Blue Blindfold Campaign entered into a strategic partnership with the UNODC and the Blue Heart Campaign to promote each other's campaigns, aiming specifically to present a clear public image of their complementary relationship while clarifying their two very distinct functions.

== Increased enforcement efforts in Europe ==
In 2011 the European Union adopted the legislation Directive 2011/36/EU on preventing and combating trafficking in human beings and protecting its victims. It aims to make legislation and penalties more effective, ensuring successful prevention and prosecution on trafficking as well as enhanced protection of, and assistance to, victims. In December 2011, the European Commission appointed Myria Vassilliadou as Anti-Trafficking Coordinator with a view to improving coordination and coherence between EU institutions and agencies as well as with Member States and international actors. The establishment of the coordinator also aims to provide for an overall strategic and policy orientation. By bringing together prevention, law enforcement, and victim protection, she will ensure that all appropriate means for EU action against trafficking are adequately used and mobilized. The European Police Office (Europol) assists EU Member States in their fight against serious and organized crime. Trafficking in human beings is one of Europol's mandated crime areas. In its 2011 report 'Trafficking in Human Beings in the European Union,' Europol concludes that "the positive steps taken by many Member States and the EU to prevent and combat trafficking in Europe have ensured that the current level of response in tackling this crime has never been higher. Lengthy prison sentences for convicted traffickers are now routine in some countries, the levels of awareness amongst law enforcement and the judiciary have been raised, victim protection and support is prioritized and national action plans provide clear examples of Member State strategy and intent. The investigation of labor exploitation is now firmly on the agenda of many countries and again indicates the willingness of countries to recognize, adapt to and combat new forms of trafficking. However, based on current reporting, intelligence, trends and patterns, it is unlikely that there will be any immediate reduction in the levels of trafficking of human beings in Europe. This crime will continue to have a major impact on the EU".
