= Ali bin Fetais Al-Marri =

Qatari lawyer

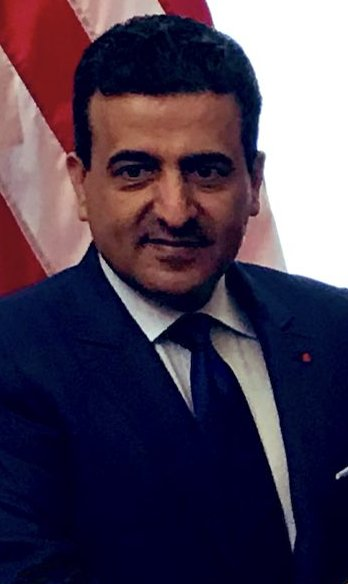
- Al-Marri in 2019

Former Attorney General of Qatar
- In office June 19, 2002 – Jun 19, 2021
- Monarch: Tamim bin Hamad Al Thani
- Prime Minister: Khalid bin Khalifa bin Abdulaziz Al Thani
- Preceded by: Position established
- Succeeded by: Issa Bin Saad Al-Jafali Al-Nuaimi

Personal details
- Born: February 8, 1965 (age 61) Doha, Qatar
- Spouse: Married
- Children: 2
- Education: Sorbonne University

Ali bin Mohsen bin Fetais Al-Marri (Arabic: علي بن محسن بن فطيس المري; born February 8, 1965) is a Senior Qatari official and magistrate.

He was the Attorney General of Qatar from 2002 to 2021.

Internationally, Ali Bin Fetais Al-Marri is United Nations Office on Drugs and Crime Special Advocate on the Prevention of Corruption.

He is the founder of the Rule of Law and Anti-Corruption Center (ROLACC), which was launched in Doha in 2012 and inaugurated by the former Secretary-General of United Nations Ban Ki-Moon.

== Biography ==
Born on February 8, 1965, in Doha, Ali Bin Fetais Al-Marri originates from the Bedouin Al-Marri tribe.

== Education ==
After completing his education in Qatar, Ali Bin Fetais Al-Marri earned a master's degree in Public Law at the University of Rennes, France, and PhD in International Law, Sorbonne University, France, 1997, on ‘Boundaries in the Arabic peninsula’.

Ali Bin Fetais Al-Marri speaks Arabic, French and English.

== Family ==
Ali Bin Fetais Al-Marri is married and father of two daughters.

== Professional career ==
=== Qatar University ===
Ali Bin Fetais Al-Marri began his career in 1997 as an assistant professor at Qatar University, where he taught international law.

=== Council of Ministers ===
In 1997, he was appointed Assistant Secretary-General of the Council of Ministers and attended weekly meetings.

=== Diwan of the Emir ===
From 1998, he headed the legal department of the Diwan of the Emir of Qatar, with the position of Under-Secretary.

In March 2001, Ali Bin Fetais Al-Marri represented Qatar before the International Court of Justice in the case of maritime delimitation and territorial issues between Qatar and Bahrain.

=== Attorney General ===
Ali Bin Fetais Al-Marri is appointed Attorney General of Qatar by a decree of the Emir on June 19, 2002.

== International nominations ==
=== United Nations ===
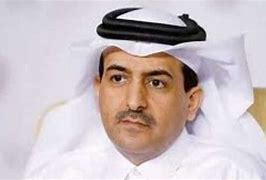
Dr. Al Marri attending a local event in Doha, Qatar

Ali Bin Fetais Al-Marri has been a member of the United Nations International Law Commission since 2002. In September 2012, he was appointed Special Regional Representative of the United Nations Office on Drugs and Crime (UNODC) for the recovery of stolen assets. His responsibilities included supporting the activities concerning the enhancement of international strategies for stolen funds recovery, offering counsel, and contributing to the definition of capacity-building and technical assistance activities for the establishment of national systems for the recovery of funds and prevention of restricted financial flows, and enhancing mutual judicial assistance.

His mandate was renewed in 2014, and his title was modified in UN UN Special Advocate on the Prevention of Corruption. Since then, Dr. Ali bin Fetais has ex officio contributed to the call to the reduction of corruption in governmental and academic institutions.

=== ROLACC ===
Ali Bin Fetais Al-Marri is the founder and Chairman of the Board of Trustees of the Rule of Law and Anti-Corruption Centre which aims to build specialized knowledge and raise individual capacity to strengthen the rule of law and fight corruption in accordance with international standards and national requirements. It also seeks to support the parties concerned in the Arab countries and other countries in the areas of upholding the rule of law, good governance, and fighting corruption. The Center conducted many activities locally, regionally and internationally, notable of which is the organization of conferences, workshops and signing of conventions to set up anti-corruption chair in various universities including Jordan University in Jordan, Neelain University in Sudan and Qatar University in Qatar in order to raise awareness and enhance the national capabilities to boost the concepts of the rule of law and anti-corruption.

=== UNITAR ===
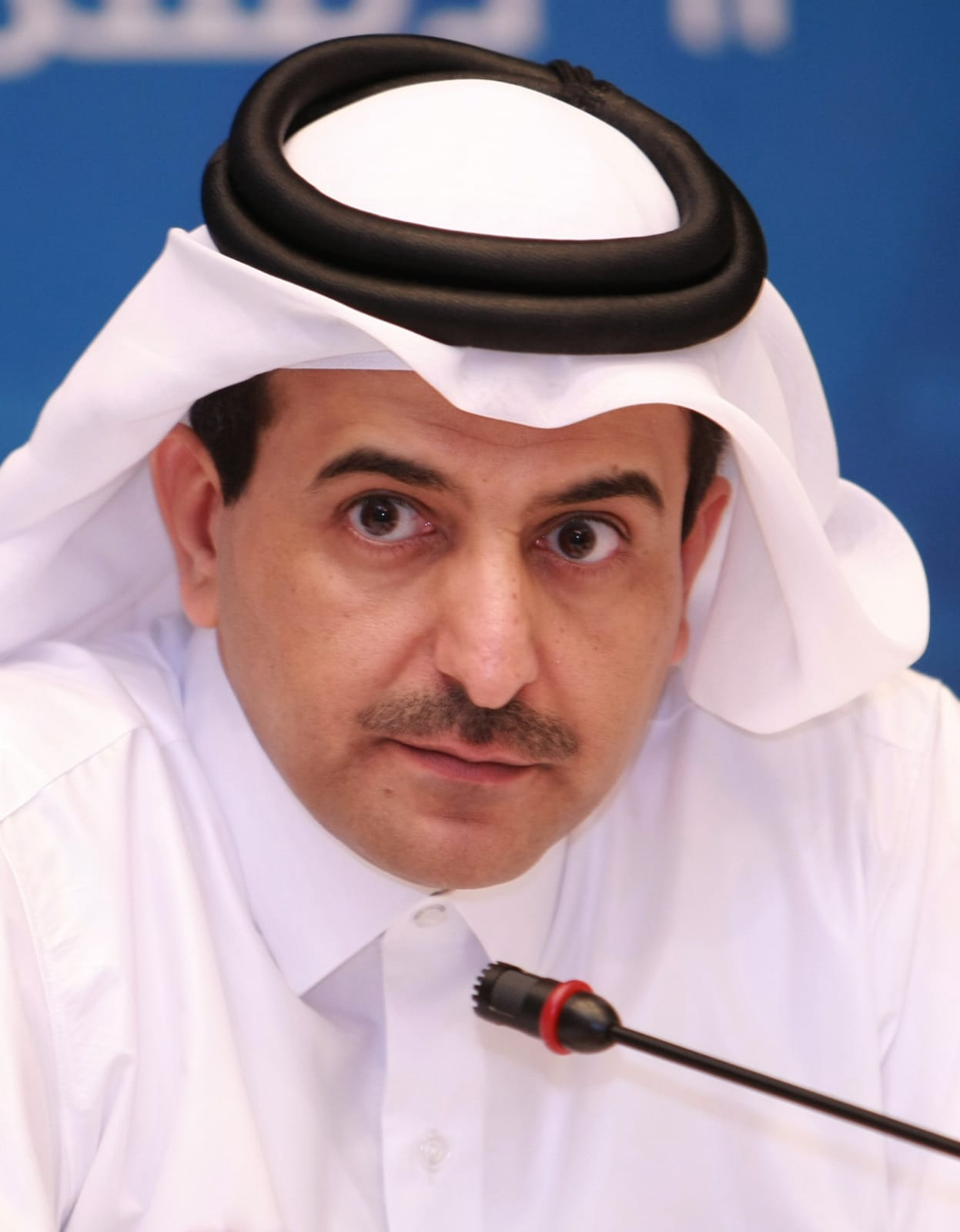
Dr. Al Marri presenting a lecture in Doha

The United Nations has chosen Attorney-General H E Dr. Ali bin Fetais Al Marri to be a member of the Peace Advisory Board of the United Nations Institute for Training and Research (UNITAR) in Geneva. The Advisory Board provides technical and critical analysis of the peacekeeping activities around the world to ensure that the quality standards adopted in compliance with the UNITAR mandate and UN guidelines are respected and well-integrated.

== Honorary distinctions and medals ==
=== France ===
- Knight – National Order of the Legion of Honor
- Officer – National Order of the Legion of Honor

=== Tunisia ===
- Grand Officer of the Order of the Republic (2013)

=== Senegal ===
- Legion of Honor with the rank of Commander
