= CARICC =

Central Asian anti-drug trafficking organization

Central Asian Regional Information and Coordination Centre – CARICC
- CARICC logo
- Abbreviation: CARICC (ЦАРИКЦ)

Agency overview
- Formed: 22 March 2009

Jurisdictional structure
- International agency
- Countries: 7 member states: Azerbaijan; Kazakhstan; Kyrgyzstan; Russia; Tajikistan; Turkmenistan; Uzbekistan
- Governing body: CARICC Council
- Constituting instrument: CARICC AGREEMENT

Operational structure
- Headquarters: 52, Abay Avenue, Almaty, Kazakhstan
- Agency executives: Mukhtarbek Madybayev, Deputy Director

Website
- www.caricc.org

The CARICC (Central Asian Regional Information and Coordination Centre for Combating Illicit Trafficking of Narcotic Drugs, Psychotropic Substances and their Precursors) is a Central Asian anti-drug trafficking organization.

In response to the need to improve inter-agency cooperation between law enforcement agencies at a national, regional and international level to counter the problem of drug trafficking from Afghanistan, in late 2004 the United Nations Office on Drugs and Crime (UNODC) together with the parties to a Memorandum of Understanding (MOU) on sub-regional drug control cooperation Azerbaijan, Kazakhstan, Kyrgyzstan, Russia, Turkmenistan, Tajikistan and Uzbekistan launched a project to establish a Central Asian Regional Information and Coordination Centre (CARICC).

On 7–8 February 2006, the institutional documents on the establishment of CARICC, developed by the experts of the participating countries and UNODC, were endorsed at the seventh ministerial review meeting of the parties to MOU held in Tashkent, Uzbekistan. Almaty, Kazakhstan was agreed as a location of the Centre.

The purpose of the Centre is to facilitate information exchange and analysis, and to assist in the coordination of operational activities of the various law enforcement agencies in the region – police, drug control agencies, customs, border guards, security services of the countries involved. These objectives have yet to be achieved.

Activities of the Centre are supported by core staff (selected on a competitive basis from the law enforcement agencies of the participating countries) and by liaison officers from each of the participating states attached to it. Provision is also made for other interested countries and international organisations such as Interpol, Europol, World Customs Organization to post liaison officers to CARICC to facilitate cooperation and information flow.

The institutional document of CARICC is the "Agreement on Establishment of CARICC", which was signed by the presidents of all member states.

The Agreement on Establishment of CARICC entered into force on 22 March 2009 following its ratification by the parliaments of Azerbaijan, Kazakhstan, Kyrgyzstan, Tajikistan and Turkmenistan. Russian Federation ratified CARICC Agreement on 9 March 2011.

On December 9, 2009 the Office of CARICC was officially inaugurated in Almaty.

Afghanistan, Austria, Canada, China, Finland, France, Germany, Italy, Pakistan, Romania, Turkey, Ukraine, USA, Interpol and SELEC, have observer status at CARICC.

The project on establishment of CARICC is implemented by the UNODC - its Regional Office for Central Asia (ROCA) with project staff based in Almaty, Kazakhstan.

The project is mainly funded the U.S. Other donors of the project were Canada, Czech Republic, Finland, France, Italy, Japan, Luxembourg, Turkey and UK.

== See also ==
- United Nations Office on Drugs and Crime
- United Nations Commission on Narcotic Drugs
