= Council of Europe Convention on Action Against Trafficking in Human Beings =

The Council of Europe Convention on Action Against Trafficking in Human Beings is a regional human rights treaty of international human rights law by the Council of Europe. The Convention aims to:

- prevent and combat all forms of human trafficking, including, but not limited to sexual exploitation and forced labour, whether national or transnational, whether or not connected with organised crime;
- to protect and assist victims and witnesses of trafficking;
- to ensure effective investigation and prosecution, and
- to promote international co-operation against trafficking.

In particular, the Convention requires national co-ordination measures, awareness raising, measures to identify and support victims and a "recovery and reflection period" during which trafficked persons will not be expelled from the receiving state.

The Convention establishes a monitoring mechanism (the Group of Experts on Action against Trafficking in Human Beings, or GRETA) consisting of 10 to 15 members elected by the states parties.

The Convention opened for signature on 16 May 2005, and entered into force on 1 February 2008. As of October 2023, it has been ratified by 47 European states and Israel. Every member state in the Council of Europe has ratified the treaty. Belarus, a non–Council of Europe state, acceded to the convention in 2013. The convention is also recalled by the Convention on preventing and combating violence against women and domestic violence.

In 2021, Israel, a non-member state of the Council of Europe, joined the convention, becoming the first country outside of Europe to do so.

== See also ==
- Protocol to Prevent, Suppress and Punish Trafficking in Persons, especially Women and Children
