= Protocol to Prevent, Suppress and Punish Trafficking in Persons, Especially Women and Children =

Protocol in the United Nations

Protocol to Prevent, Suppress and Punish Trafficking in Persons, Especially Women and Children, Supplementing the United Nations Convention Against Transnational Organized Crime
- Type: Organized crime; international criminal law
- Drafted: 15 November 2000
- Signed: 12 December 2000
- Location: New York City, United States
- Effective: 25 December 2003
- Condition: 40 ratifications
- Signatories: 117
- Parties: 185
- Depositary: Secretary-General of the United Nations
- Languages: Arabic, Chinese, English, French, Russian, and Spanish

The Protocol to Prevent, Suppress and Punish Trafficking in Persons, Especially Women and Children (also referred to as the Trafficking Protocol or UN TIP Protocol) is a protocol to the United Nations Convention Against Transnational Organized Crime. It is one of the three Palermo protocols, the others being the Protocol Against the Smuggling of Migrants by Land, Sea and Air and the Protocol Against the Illicit Manufacturing of and Trafficking in Firearms.

The protocol was adopted by the United Nations General Assembly in 2000 and entered into force on 25 December 2003. As of July 2025, it has been ratified by 185 parties.

The United Nations Office on Drugs and Crime (UNODC) is responsible for implementing the protocol. It offers practical help to states with drafting laws, creating comprehensive national anti-trafficking strategies, and assisting with resources to implement them. In March 2009, UNODC launched the Blue Heart Campaign to fight human trafficking, to raise awareness, and to encourage involvement and inspire action.

The protocol commits ratifying states to prevent and combat trafficking in persons, protecting and assisting victims of trafficking and promoting cooperation among states in order to meet those objectives.

== Content of the protocol ==
The protocol covers the following:

- Defining the trafficking in human beings and the scope of "exploitation": to be considered trafficking in persons, a situation must meet three conditions: act (i.e., recruitment), means (i.e., through the use of force or deception) and purpose (i.e., for the purpose of forced labour)
  "Trafficking in persons" shall mean the recruitment, transportation, transfer, harbouring or receipt of persons, by means of the threat or use of force or other forms of coercion, of abduction, of fraud, of deception, of the abuse of power or of a position of vulnerability or of the giving or receiving of payments or benefits to achieve the consent of a person having control over another person, for the purpose of exploitation. Exploitation shall include, at a minimum, the exploitation of the prostitution of others or other forms of sexual exploitation, forced labour or services, slavery or practices similar to slavery, servitude or the removal of organs... The consent of a victim of trafficking in persons to the intended exploitation set forth [above] shall be irrelevant where any of the means set forth [above] have been used.
  (Articles 3a, 3b)
- Requiring states to adopt legislation criminalising trafficking as so defined, acting as an accomplice to other traffickers and organizing trafficking by others (Article 5)
- Facilitating the return and acceptance of children who have been victims of cross-border trafficking, with due regard to their safety
- Prohibiting the trafficking of children (defined as being under 18 years of age) for purposes of commercial sexual exploitation of children (CSEC), exploitative labour practices, or the removal of body parts
- Ensuring that definitions of trafficking reflect the need for special safeguards and care for children, including appropriate legal protection
- Ensuring that trafficked persons are not punished for any offences or activities related to their having been trafficked, such as prostitution and immigration violations
- Ensuring that victims of trafficking are protected from deportation or return where there are reasonable grounds to suspect that such return would represent a significant security risk to the trafficked person or their family
- Considering temporary or permanent residence in countries of transit or destination for trafficking victims in exchange for testimony against alleged traffickers, or on humanitarian and compassionate grounds
- Providing for the confiscation of the instruments and proceeds of trafficking and related offences to be used for the benefit of trafficked persons
- Arrangements for dispute resolution between State Parties (Article 15).

== Regional action against trafficking in human beings ==
In Warsaw on 16 May 2005, the Council of Europe Convention on Action against Trafficking in Human Beings was opened for accession. The convention established a Group of Experts on Action against Trafficking in Human Beings (GRETA) which monitors the implementation of the convention through country reports. It has been ratified (as of January 2016) by 45 European states, while a further one state (Turkey) has signed but not yet ratified it.

Complementary protection is ensured through the Council of Europe Convention on the Protection of Children against Sexual Exploitation and Sexual Abuse (Lanzarote, 25 Oct 2007).

In addition, the European Court of Human Rights of the Council of Europe in Strasbourg has passed judgments involving trafficking in human beings which violated obligations under the European Convention on Human Rights: Siliadin v France, judgment of 26 July 2005, and Rantsev v Cyprus and Russia, judgment of 7 January 2010.

The Council of Europe co-operates closely with the United Nations.

== See also ==
- Child selling
- Child laundering
- Child harvesting
- Convention for the Suppression of the Traffic in Persons and of the Exploitation of the Prostitution of Others
- International Convention for the Suppression of the Traffic in Women and Children
- List of international adoption scandals
