= Rule of Law and Anti-Corruption Center =

- Rule of Law and Anti-Corruption Center - مركز حكم القانون ومكافحة الفساد
- Abbreviation: ROLACC
- Formation: 1 January 2009; 17 years ago
- Type: Anti-Corruption organization
- Purpose: Officially aimed at promoting "good governance practices".
- Headquarters: Doha, Qatar; Geneva, Switzerland
- Region served: Worldwide
- Official languages: English, Arabic
- Director-General: Ali Bin Fetais al-Marri
- Website: www.rolacc.qa

The Rule of Law and Anti-Corruption Centre (ROLACC) is an organisation founded in Doha in 2009 by Ali Bin Fetais al-Marri, attorney general of Qatar, which officially aims to promote "good governance practices". A subsidiary office of ROLACC was created in Geneva, Switzerland, on 28 March 2017.

The organisation has been subject to multiple controversies, in particular for its close ties with the Attorney General of Qatar and his family, who own the ROLACC offices in Geneva, and who are accused in the press of ill-gotten property acquired in Europe.

== Description ==
ROLACC organises conferences and training programs and contributes to the financing of research.

ROLACC is headed by Ali Bin Fetais al-Marri, Abdulmehsen Hamad Mr. A. Fetais, a member of his family, and Mohamad Khaled Al Koutob.

UN Secretary-General Ban Ki-moon attended the inauguration of the centre. In partnership with the University of Sussex, ROLACC also offers a master's degree in Corruption, Law and Governance.

In May 2018, the centre signed a partnership with the Foundation for Strategic Research to develop joint programs and exchange knowledge. This agreement between the foundation recognized for its public utility and the Qatari center have been subject to criticism in France, due to a possible conflict of interest.

== Controversies ==
=== Ill-gotten gains ===
Although the purpose of ROLACC is "to improve the rule of law", its founder and president has been accused by Le Point of secretly owning luxurious real estate in Paris and Geneva in inadequacy with his official income

In addition, GSG Immobilier SA, a Swiss company owned by the Attorney General of Qatar with his daughter Maha Ali M. A. Fetais, owns the ROLACC offices in Geneva. This scheme surprised various media.

The Attorney General of Qatar has also been criticized for having accounts at the National Bank of Kuwait and for having violated several human rights laws.

=== Reputation laundering ===
At an awards ceremony against corruption hosted in Geneva by the Attorney General of Qatar, the newspaper Le Temps reported "Qatar is awarding itself a prize against corruption," noting that shortly before, the country had funded renovations at the United Nations in Geneva.

The newspaper questioned if this award was not "a way of countering suspicions" of corruption against Qatar.

=== Corruption accusations ===
According to French journalists Georges Malbrunot and Christian Chesnot, authors of the book Our Dear Emirs, the Attorney General of Qatar and ROLACC Chairman tried to "offer" a luxurious watch to Bruno Dalles, the Director of TRACFIN, the French financial intelligence agency, who was scandalized. Bruno Dalles told the reporters: "I was both vexed and stuck by the process, while I had just explained him the purpose of my job is to increase transparency in the movement of funds."

=== Links with Karim Wade ===
Senegalese media have widely criticized the close ties between Ali Bin Fetais Al-Marri and Karim Wade, Senegalese politician, sentenced for corruption who is now living in exile in Qatar.

=== Swiss officials boycott ===
According to the prestigious Swiss newspaper NZZ, Simonetta Sommaruga, the Swiss federal justice minister refused to sign a Memorandum of Understanding with Ali Bin Fetais Al-Marri given his dubious reputation. The Swiss Federal Attorney was passed the file and he initially also refused to sign the document. He eventually did so, discreetly, the newspaper reveals. Qatari officials, including Ali Bin Fetais Al-Marri, have been unhelpful in investigating corruption for the next FIFA World Cup in Qatar, the NZZ reported.
