= East African drug trade =

Sale of illegal drugs in East African countries

East African drug trade refers to the sale and trafficking of illegal drugs that take place in East African countries like Kenya, Tanzania, Uganda, Somalia, and Ethiopia. The most prevalent types of drugs traded in East Africa are heroin, marijuana, cocaine, methamphetamine, and khat, all of which are strictly prohibited in East African countries.

The United Nations Office on Drugs and Crime reports that the number of reported seizures of illegal drugs between 1995 and 2006 is inadequate to conclude that the patterns of trafficking and possible drug abuse are alarming. Nevertheless, the low number of officially reported seizures is not a sign of minimal activity. Instead, it is an indication of the lack of border control, insufficient understanding of the drug trade, and a weak criminal justice system. Though research on the effects of drug trade in East Africa remains lower than that of other regions, trafficking of drugs have often been correlated with corruption, terrorism, HIVs and youth.

In fact, drug trafficking in East Africa has been sharply increasing in the past few decades. As the region experiences limited supply for its rising demand of drugs, East African countries have been involved in international drug trafficking as well. Due to popular trafficking routes to Europe and the United States like the Balkan Route experiencing increased surveillance, drugs from Asia have been traveling through East African countries into Africa or ultimately to Europe and the United States. The Journal of International Affairs stated in 2012 that the UNODC reported a four-fold increase in cocaine seizures in East Africa between 2005 and 2010. Similarly, the number of seizures of heroin at major ports in East Africa increased nearly ten times between 2009 and 2013. Such data shows that East African trade is constantly growing, and that countries have been increasingly responding to illicit drug trafficking.

== Background and History ==
Map of East Africa

Due to its history and geography, East Africa is an ideal port of entry for the transportation of drugs from Asia. Historical trade routes through the Indian Ocean to Asia and through sub-Saharan Africa have facilitated the flow of legal goods for many years. In the 1970s, however, due to negative effects of the African debt crisis and its associated structural adjustment programs, legitimate routes of commerce have increasingly become conduits of illicit substances with loosened interference from authorities.

The sociopolitical environment of many countries in East Africa has further encouraged illegal drug trafficking. Weak law enforcement operations and relative new exposure to illegal drug trade throughout the region have unequipped governments to prevent smuggling. Moreover, corruption has encouraged lucrative illegal operations, as elections in countries such as Kenya have been funded by profits from illicit drug trade to gain greater political power. Additionally, bribery to ignore criminal activities has become a more prominent concern in the region in the past decades.

Illegal drug trafficking in East Africa can be traced back to the mid-1980s, when drug traffickers started using East African countries as their transit sites. The drug trade in East Africa was originally organized and managed by Nigerian crime organizations. In more recent years, criminal organizations from Kenya and Tanzania have also begun to play major roles.

Initially, the illegal drug trade through East Africa overwhelmingly traded just two drugs: marijuana and brown sugar heroin. The latter was a type of heroin that was heated into vapor and inhaled, or combined with marijuana into a joint to be smoked. Since brown sugar heroin was administered without a needle, its status as a public health risk was downplayed. Drugs in the early East African drug trade were already being smuggled into Western countries and were present in tourist hubs throughout East Africa.

In the late 1990s, brown sugar heroin was replaced in the global drug trade by a new type of heroin. White crest heroin, also known as white powdered heroin, was significantly more potent than other forms of heroin and injectable. Unlike brown sugar heroin, it did not require a complex heating process and was therefore easy to use. Starting in the early 2000s, white crest heroin became very common in East Africa itself for both domestic use and international trafficking, especially in Kenya and Tanzania.

The domestic use and smuggling of marijuana and white crest heroin continued into the 2000s. Methamphetamines also became a common illicit drug soon; the first seizure of them was in 2008. There is a lack of data and scholarly research that covers methamphetamines in East Africa, although a growing number of seizures since the first have been recorded. Cocaine is another drug that has become prevalent in the East African drug trade more recently.

According to the United Nations Office on Drugs and Crime (UNODA), there are four main causes that have been contributing to the rise in illicit drug trade in East Africa. For one, the increasing demand in the broader African continent has created and expanded a market for drugs. Second, with more frequent international flights in and out of Africa, the transportation of goods have also helped the shipment of drugs. Third, East Africa lacks sufficient trafficking control measures, which have allowed actors of drug trade to travel in and out of the region with greater ease. Finally, the UNODC points corruption in customs and law enforcement as a factor for growing drug trade trends.

== Supply and Demand ==
=== Supply ===
Most African countries lack adequate infrastructure—the facilities and knowledge—to commercially domestically produce drugs to match international and domestic demands. Cannabis is one of the only drugs that has consistently been domestically produced. But, even cannabis production in East Africa has been inadequate to satisfy demands from Europe, the United States, and East African countries due to legal prohibition on production and consequent lack of a mass production system. Such a shortage in domestic supply of illicit drugs have made East African countries more reliant on international supplies.

The majority of the supply of illicit drugs traded in East Africa comes from Asia. East Africa's two main drug suppliers, Afghanistan and Southeast Asia, are also the two largest suppliers of illicit drugs in the world. In 2020, Afghan opium production accounted for approximately 85% of global production of opium as well as for 80% of opium consumers globally, part of which has been trafficked into East Africa.

=== Demand ===
The demand that fuels the East African drug trade comes from both international and domestic sources. Historically, demand came predominantly from Western countries, but in recent years East African countries have established themselves as consumers of illicit drugs. For instance, Tanzania—especially in the islands of Zanzibar—has seen a dramatic increase in domestic drug use. A staggering 7% of the Zanzibari population is considered to be addicted to illicit drugs. The increasing levels of drug use and addiction in East African countries show that domestic demand has also been constantly growing.

The origin of Western demand comes from centers of tourism that were developed before the 1980s. Coastal resorts in East Africa saw an influx of European, South African, and American tourists, who sparked demand for marijuana and heroin in the region. Beginning in the 1980s, the war on drugs in the United States greatly strengthened East Africa as a piece of the international drug trade because competing drug smuggling operations in Central and South America were closed or significantly impeded.

== Routes of Entry ==
=== Air ===
The Kenyan city Nairobi and the Ethiopian city Addis Ababa have become key points of entry for illegal drugs on the continent that are smuggled through air transport. The Jomo Kenyatta International Airport in Nairobi received a Category One status from the U.S. Federal Aviation Authority in 2017, allowing travelers from the U.S. to fly directly into Nairobi instead of having to transfer in Amsterdam or Heathrow. This change in status has made Kenya a major transfer point, especially for flights from neighboring East African countries like Uganda, Tanzania, Ethiopia, and Rwanda. As a result, the high volume of commercial flights flying in and out of Nairobi has made Nairobi a key point in air routes. Similarly, the Bole International Airport in Addis Ababa experiences more than 22 million passengers annually, being one of the most busy airports on the continent. Between 2019 and 2020, the Ethiopian police has arrested nearly 100 drug traffickers at Bole International Airport. In addition, the Federal Police Commission, drug seizures in the past three years amount to 402 kilograms of Latin American cocaine and 1377 kilograms of cannabis. Drug trafficking through the Bole International Airport is particularly high because the Counter Narcotics Operations Unit has significant infrastructural problems. The unit does not have trained officers, on-site scanning technology, sniffer dogs, on-site testing facilities, or an intelligence system that targets specific flights.

=== Sea ===
The most prominent route that has been responsible for the trafficking of illicit drugs from Afghanistan is the sea route. Discreetly packaged drugs, including opium, heroin, and methamphetamine from Afghanistan travels to ports on the Makran Coast, which lies along the southern borders of Iran and Pakistan. At the ports on the Makran Coast, the drugs are distributed into fishing vessels in small packages ranging from 3 kilograms to 6 kilograms. From there, the fishing vessels travel through the Indian Ocean, and arrive at popular tourist venues in East Africa such as Zanzibar in Tanzania, or Pemba and the Quirimbas islands in Mozambique. In the latter, low severity of tidal waves and extensive sand dunes in the area allow a conducive environment for smugglers to avoid searches. Larger quantities of heroin are also trafficked using the same routes, but are concealed in containers carrying motor vehicle parts, appliances, and agricultural products from Pakistan. Cocaine is also traffiqued from Brazil inside goods containers.

These drugs then make their way to the mainland, and are smuggled overland to other African countries such as South Africa. Drugs are also smuggled by sea from Dar es Salaam to the Comoros.

== Types of Drugs ==
Among the variety of drugs that are trafficked in and out of East Africa, the most popular exports include heroin, marijuana, cocaine, methamphetamine, and now khat.

=== Heroin ===
Since 2006, heroin usage in Africa has increased faster than on any other continent. As of today, Africa currently experiences its highest increase in drug use, further increasing its demand for heroin. In terms of consumption, East Africa receives about 9% of the heroin trade globally. Large seizures of heroin by the Combined Maritime Forces (CMF) reveal East Africa's growing involvement in the global heroin trade. Totaling over 674 kg in 2012, heroin is no longer traded at small quantities. The drug is mainly shipped from Afghanistan and Pakistan through maritime and aerial routes into East African countries such as Kenya and Ethiopia. Additionally, the International Narcotics Control Board (INCB) indicates that the East African region is a notable conduit for heroin smuggling from Southwest Asia to other parts of the globe.

=== Marijuana ===
Marijuana was first introduced in East Africa during the Middle Ages by Muslim traders from Egypt and the Arabian Peninsula. Marijuana has gained more attention as a topic of medical research across the continent, and many African countries began to discuss the legalization of the drug. Malawi is one of the major producers of the drug, and its government is currently allowing trial productions of high-quality strains of cannabis. The government of Malawi became the first in East Africa to legalize the cultivation, sale, and export of marijuana in February 2020. However, illicit cultivation and trade of marijuana is still common throughout East Africa because the growth of these crops allows farmers who face financial barriers to pursue new economic avenues.

=== Cocaine ===
Cocaine trafficking is most common in North Africa, but the drug has been attaining a growing presence in East Africa despite being a region far from conventional cocaine smuggling routes. Starting in 2004, there have been several high-profile seizures in East Africa. From 2005 and 2010, cocaine seizures in East Africa had increased by four times. As the emerging middle class in East Africa contributes to the increasing demand for cocaine, many East African governments are worried about the rising availability and prevalence of cocaine in the region. Along with heroin, cocaine has been involved in elections in countries such as Kenya, to which the profit derived from its sales has been used to fund campaigns and increase political power.

=== Methamphetamine ===
Methamphetamine has taken over the global drug market in recent decades. It can have devastating effects on communities of all economic situations because of the drug's widespread affordability and availability. While authorities in East Africa have not discovered any major operations to manufacture methamphetamine, they have reported minor confiscations of the drug in transit to Asia. In terms of production, Nigerian crime groups are the most well known and active actor in the region. Moreover, more illicit markets of methamphetamine are on the rise in East Africa as a rivalry between "Mexican meth" from Nigeria and "Pakistani meth" from Afghanistan has prompted each to seize control of the region's trade.

=== Khat ===
Khat is a plant-based drug native to Ethiopia that is widely consumed in East African countries including Ethiopia, Yemen, Somalia, Djibouti, Kenya, Tanzania, and Uganda. Consumers of khat consider its psychotropic effects to be stronger than that of marijuana. The Somali Civil War and the resulting dispersion of Somali people across not only Africa, but also other countries brought public attention to the consumption and trade of khat taking place in East Africa. In Kenya, domestically produced khat is sold across the country as well as exported to neighboring countries with high demands for khat. While khat consumption and trade is not illicit in countries like Kenya and Uganda, where producers of khat aim to sell for profit, the growing consumption, especially among the youth, has given rise to local movements and efforts to ban trade and consumption.

== Effects ==
Research on the effects of the drug trade on the countries and populations in East Africa is less common than that of other regions of the continent, but reveals that the impacts of the East African drug trade are widespread across numerous sectors. African police agencies have few resources and little capacity to record crime statistics; but when they do, they often do not differentiate between conventional and transnational criminal activity. Much of the scholarship that discusses the effects of the East African drug trade is derived from a small amount of qualitative data, and case studies that lack quantitative data to substantiate their claims.

=== Corruption ===
The illegal drug trade is a lucrative venture that affects corruption levels in governments. Countries are more vulnerable to corruption with weak states and insufficient frameworks of law enforcement. According to the International Journal of Drug Policy, there is considerable evidence that finds a relationship between drug trafficking and involvement of government officials. Corruption poses great concerns in East Africa as economic and institutional weaknesses can elicit significant levels of corruption among government officials and employees with just a small pool of financial resources. Moreover, the lack of parameters of drug-related offenses in criminal justice systems is problematic with complicit some involvement of authorities. It allows for the increased flow of drugs throughout East Africa and handicaps counter-narcotic efforts, ultimately strengthening the organizational structures of drug trafficking. The International Journal of Drug Policy reports that drug trafficking can hinder economic growth because it is rare for illegal drug profits to flow into long-term and sustainable capital investments. Corruption undermines the state's capacity to develop robust institutions that are essential for establishing the rule of law and strong economies. Moreover, the Journal of International Affairs states concerns about Kenya's growing proneness to corruption as the presence of organized crime groups have expanded.

=== Terrorism ===
Profits from the illegal drug trade in East Africa are being used to finance terrorist organizations and other insurgent movements; however, the degree to which said groups are funded by the drug trade is unknown. The United States Drug Enforcement Administration claims that a large portion of the organizations that are labeled as foreign terrorist organizations have direct ties to the illicit drug trade. Many groups incriminated in the drug smuggling industry have been tied to terrorist groups in East Africa, most notably Al-Shabaab. Other groups related to Al-Shabaab are prominent, such as the Muslim Youth Center of Kenya, which recruits young foreigners to fight for Al-Shabaab. Such terrorist groups have assisted in the smuggling of drugs as well as personnel both into East Africa and between African countries. The international nature of the drug trade means that those arrested in East Africa can be prosecuted by the US and other Western countries if a link is found with terrorist groups, even if the arrested people are not transporting the drugs to Western countries. The drugs fund these terrorist groups and allow them to continue operations. Additionally, these groups often smuggle black market sugar and resources such as charcoal in and out of the region.

=== HIV ===
Injecting drugs with needles is credited with the rise of HIV in East African countries. In particular, in the countries of Mozambique, Tanzania, Madagascar, and Kenya, those who partake in drugs are more likely to have HIV. Consumers of drugs are more likely to contract HIV before the age of 25 compared to the general population, and statistics point toward a higher rate of HIV infections compared to the general population.

The HIV epidemic has struck some countries harder than others; Kenya has been hit the hardest. Drug use among sex workers is a major cause of the issue. Sex workers inject drugs before or after intercourse. Due to lack of funds, they are forced to use contaminated needles. Combined with a lack of knowledge about the disease itself, contamination through injection has led to a spike in HIV rates among sex workers, which in turn has led to a proliferation of the disease across the country. Heroin is a particularly notable cause of HIV transmission through injection. In the 21st century, injection became the most popular method of inserting heroin into the body. There are approximately 10,000 heroin users in Nairobi and another 8,000 users along the coastal towns in Kenya. From this population, an estimate 68% to 88% have HIV, which connects injection drug use to the prevalence of HIV in Kenya. The International Journal of Drug Policy states that "drug use has been a major factor in the spread of HIV in developing countries, often as a result of syringe sharing and re-use." Few people are aware of the risks involved with the use and reuse of syringes. In addition, in the case of Kenya, 20% of the general population is estimated to be HIV-positive. The combination of the prevalence of HIV, the injection of drugs, and the lack of healthcare and awareness that exists around these dangerous practices suggest a hazardous environment that could contribute to a public health crisis. Researchers in Tanzania and Kenya found that the HIV rate among a sample of heroin users was more than 50%, which is well over the 13% average.

=== Youth ===
Africa is the most youthful continent in the world. While most of the world is experiencing an aging population, sixty percent of Africans are under the age of 25. Demand for drugs from youth has caused a proliferation of access to illegal drugs in East Africa. The International Journal of Drug Policy says that "according to World Bank data, illicit drug users in developing countries 'typically fall within the age group of 15–44, although most are in their mid-twenties.'" For example, in 2021, an estimated 11% of youth population aged between 18 and 24 years were reported to use illicit drugs in Kenya. Case studies have produced evidence to reaffirm the concern that links the proliferation of illegal drugs and the large youthful population. Also, the same journal describes that researchers working in the coastal and interior regions of Tanzania have found that "excluding cannabis, heroin was the most commonly used drug, and was concentrated among young men of working age." The use of drugs in youthful populations may lead to a decrease in productivity, and public health crises.

Currently, many countries in Africa, such as Tanzania and Mauritius, are developing methadone programs to stem the tide of drug injections, which are a major cause of HIV. These programs forgo abstinence by offering medicine to alleviate the symptoms of withdrawal. Thousands are now enrolling in these programs in order to overcome addiction, and avoid the threat of HIV infection due to injection by contaminated needles.

== Responses ==
In response to the increase in drug trade in East Africa, the role of the government has also grown over the past decades. While the response of each country varies, cases in Kenya, Tanzania, and Uganda are more commonly recorded and studied.

=== Kenya ===
Flag of Kenya

A high volume of heroin and cocaine are transited into Kenya from Pakistan, Iran and Latina America through aerial and sea routes to North America and Europe. Drug trafficking networks that involved Kenyans have developed ties with members of the judiciary and within law enforcement agencies in order to gain positions of power, most notably in politics, through drug profits. In response, Kenya had implemented the Narcotics Drug and Psychotropic Substances (Control) Act in 1994 and has since made public efforts to consolidate a stronger stance against drug trade. The policy helped seize 1000 kilograms of cocaine and 1.5 tons of heroine, some of the biggest seizures of the continent. In 2021, an amendment to the 1994 legislation was passed by the National Assembly of Kenya. It aims to clarify judicial parameters of penalties regarding the trafficking of illicit narcotics, update the list of substances that are allowed in the manufacture of drugs, strengthen penalties for law enforcement officers who aid or commit illegal trade and possession of drugs, and more. Kenya has further strengthened maritime security agencies, including the Kenya Coast Guard Service (KCGS) for increased prevention and enforcement of drug transportation into and outside of the country. In 2020, the KCGS has partnered with the United Nations on Drugs and Crime (UNODC) Global Maritime Crime Programme (GMCP) to focus on capacity building and help protect Kenyan waters from illicit drug trafficking.

=== Tanzania ===
Flag of Tanzania

The Tanzanian Parliament had created the Drug Control and Enforcement Authority through the Drug Control and Enforcement Act to tackle drug use and drug trafficking from a more coordinated and focused approach. The Drug Control and Enforcement Authority has collaborated with EU-ACT Project to host two major meetings with major participants being heads of law-enforcement agencies across Africa and Europe. During those meetings, participants actively discussed ways to enhance and share maritime intelligence. The Drug Control and Enforcement Authority is also facilitating a project named JODARI, which targets illegal fishing and trafficking of illicit drugs along the coasts of Tanzania in accordance with UNODC recommendations. In 2021, the Drug Control and Enforcement Authority received a global honor for being the best institution controlling the trafficking of narcotic drugs as its robust training programs in addition to a large number of seizures were recognized. Despite recent success and recognition, the Drug Control and Enforcement Authority plans to expand its strategies to address the growing rate of consumption and trafficking of marijuana in Tanzania.

=== Uganda ===
Flag of Uganda

The Ugandan government had adopted the Narcotic Drugs and Psychotropic Substances Act in 2016 in order to define a clearer and a more punitive measure to drug crime convictions. The legislation includes a number of punitive measures to put a halt to the rising rates of illicit drug consumption and trafficking in Uganda. For instance, possession of illicit drugs may result in a 10 to 25-year sentence, trafficking—defined to include even small amounts of smuggling—can be punished with a life sentence, and the failure to disclose prescriptions for narcotics can result in a 5-year sentence.

== See also ==
- Drug trade in West Africa
- United Nations Office on Drugs and Crime
- United Nations Commission on Narcotic Drugs
