= Narcotic =

Chemical substance with psychoactive properties

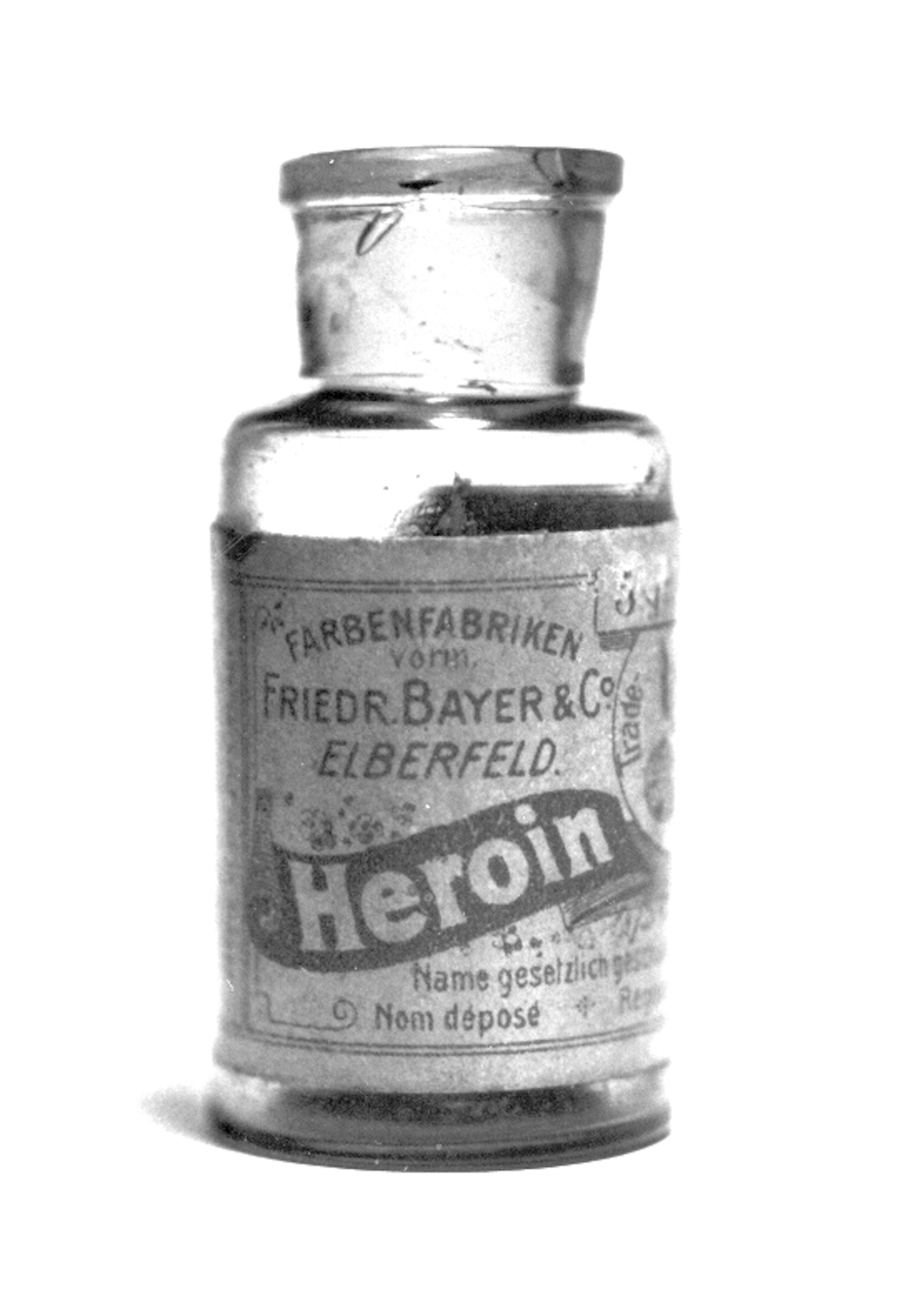
Heroin, a powerful opioid and narcotic

The term narcotic (/nɑːrˈkɒtɪk/, from ancient Greek ναρκῶ narkō, "I make numb") originally referred medically to any psychoactive compound with numbing or paralyzing properties. In the United States, it has since become associated with opiates and opioids, commonly morphine and heroin, as well as derivatives of many of the compounds found within raw opium latex.

Legally speaking, the term "narcotic" may be imprecisely defined and typically has negative connotations. When used in a legal context in the U.S., a narcotic drug is totally prohibited, such as heroin, or one that is used in violation of legal regulation (in this word sense, equal to any controlled substance or illicit drug).

In the medical community, the term is more precisely defined as a synonym of opioids and generally does not carry the same negative connotations.

Statutory classification of a drug as a narcotic often increases the penalties for violation of drug control statutes. For example, although U.S. federal law classifies both cocaine and amphetamines as "Schedule II" drugs, the penalty for possession of cocaine is greater than the penalty for possession of amphetamines because cocaine, unlike amphetamines, is classified as a narcotic.

Research acknowledges that alcohol can have similar effects to narcotics in head or trunk trauma situations.

== United Nations ==
=== Single Convention on Narcotic Drugs, 1961 ===
The adoption of this convention is regarded as a milestone in the history of the international drug ban. The Single Convention codified all existing multilateral treaties on drug control and extended the existing control systems to include the cultivation of plants that were grown as the raw material of narcotic drugs. The principal objectives of the convention are to limit the possession, use, trade, distribution, import, export, manufacture, and production of drugs exclusively for medical and scientific purposes, and to address drug trafficking through international cooperation to deter and discourage drug traffickers. The convention also established the International Narcotics Control Board, merging the Permanent Central Board and the Drug Supervisory Board.

The 1961 Convention seeks to control over 116 drugs that it classifies as narcotic. These include:

- plant-based products such as opium and its derivatives morphine, codeine, and heroin (the primary category of drug listed in the convention);
- synthetic narcotics such as methadone and pethidine; and
- cannabis, coca, and cocaine.

The Convention divides drugs into four groups, or schedules, to enforce a greater or lesser degree of control for the various substances and compounds. Opium smoking and eating, coca leaf chewing, cannabis resin smoking, and the non-medical use of cannabis are prohibited. The 1972 Protocol to this Convention calls for increased efforts to prevent illicit production of, traffic in, and use of narcotics as defined by the convention, while highlighting the need to provide treatment and rehabilitation services to drug abusers.

=== INCB Yellow List ===
This document contains the current list of narcotic drugs under international control and additional information to assist governments in filling in the International Narcotics Control Board questionnaires related to narcotic drugs, namely, form A, form B and form C.

In medicine, a chemical agent that induces stupor, coma, or insensibility to pain (also called narcotic analgesic).

In the context of international drug control, "narcotic drug" means any drug defined as such under the 1961 Convention.

== World Health Organization ==
=== Lexicon of alcohol and drug terms published by the World Health Organization ===
The term usually refers to opiates or opioids, which are called narcotic analgesics. In common parlance and legal usage, it is often used imprecisely to mean illicit drugs, irrespective of their pharmacology. For example, narcotics control legislation in Canada, the US, and certain other countries includes cocaine and cannabis as well as opioids (see also conventions, international drug). Because of this variation in usage, the term is best replaced by one with a more specific meaning (e.g. opioid).

== United States ==
Section 1300.01 Definitions relating to controlled substances:

(b) As used in parts 1301 through 1308 and part 1312 of this chapter, the following terms shall have the meanings specified:

(30) The term narcotic drug means any of the following whether produced directly or indirectly by extraction from substances of vegetable origin or independently using chemical synthesis or by a combination of extraction and chemical synthesis:

(i) Opium, opiates, derivatives of opium and opiates, including their isomers, esters, ethers, salts, and salts of isomers, esters, and ethers whenever the existence of such isomers, esters, ethers, and salts is possible within the specific chemical designation. Such a term does not include the isoquinoline alkaloids of opium.

(ii) Poppy straw and concentrate of poppy straw.

(iii) Coca leaves, except coca leaves and extracts of coca leaves from which cocaine, ecgonine and derivatives of ecgonine or their salts have been removed.

(iv) Cocaine, its salts, optical and geometric isomers, and salts of isomers.

(v) Ecgonine, its derivatives, their salts, isomers, and salts of isomers.

(vi) Any compound, mixture, or preparation which contains any quantity of any of the substances referred to in paragraphs (b)(31)(i) through (v) of this section.

A 1984 amendment to 21 USC (Controlled Substances Act), Section 802 expanded and revised definition of "narcotic drug", including within term poppy straw, cocaine, and ecgonine.

=== U.S. v. Stieren ===
608 F.2d 1135

United States Court of Appeals, Eighth Circuit. Decided Oct. 31, 1979. LAY, Circuit Judge.

John Arthur Stieren appeals from the judgment of conviction for possession of cocaine with intent to distribute and dispense under 21 U.S.C. § 841(a)(1). Stieren contends that the statute is unconstitutional because "cocaine is classified as a narcotic under Schedule II of 21 U.S.C. § 812(c) when as a matter of scientific and medical fact cocaine is not a narcotic but is a non-narcotic stimulant."

The sufficiency of the evidence is not disputed. Stieren was convicted after special agents testified that he had and attempted to sell them a large quantity of cocaine. Defendant urges that the testimony and reports by physicians and scientists demonstrate that cocaine is not a narcotic. He also cites cases that hold that cocaine is not a narcotic under the pharmacological definition of the term. State v. Erickson, 574 P.2d 1 (Alaska 1978).

It is within the legislative prerogative to classify cocaine, which is a non-narcotic central nervous system stimulant, as a narcotic for penalty and regulatory purposes. 21 U.S.C. § 802(16)(A). The use of cocaine poses serious problems for the community and has a high potential for abuse. Congress's choice of penalty reflects a societal policy that must be adhered to by the courts.2 Congress has the power to reclassify cocaine. This power has been delegated to the Attorney General. 21 U.S.C. § 811(a)(1). If cocaine is to be reclassified, the defendant's arguments should be made to the legislative branch, not the courts.

We hold that Congress had a rational legislative purpose when it classified cocaine as a Schedule II narcotic drug to impose penalties.

JUDGMENT AFFIRMED.

== History ==
The term "narcotic" is believed to have been coined by the Greek physician Galen to refer to agents that numb or deaden, causing paralysis or loss of feeling. It is based on the Greek word ναρκωσις (narcosis), the term used by Hippocrates for the process of numbing or the numbed state. Galen listed mandrake root, altercus (eclata), seeds, and poppy juice (opium) as the chief examples. It originally referred to any substance that relieved pain, dulled the senses, or induced sleep. Now, the term is used in many ways. Some people might define narcotics as substances that bind at opioid receptors (cellular membrane proteins activated by substances like heroin or morphine), while others refer to any illicit substance as a narcotic. From a U.S. legal perspective, narcotics refer to opium, opium derivatives, and their semi-synthetic substitutes, though in U.S. law, due to its numbing properties, cocaine is also considered a narcotic.

The definition encompassing "any illegal drug" was first recorded in 1926. Its first use as an adjective is first attested to c. 1600. There are many different types of narcotics. The two most common forms of narcotic drugs are morphine and codeine. Both are synthesized from opium for medicinal use. The most commonly used drug for recreational purposes created from opium is heroin. Synthesized drugs created with an opium base for use in pain management are fentanyl, oxycodone, tramadol, pethidine (Demerol), hydrocodone, methadone, and hydromorphone. New forms of existing pain medications are being created regularly. The newest formulation to come out was in 2014 when zohydro, an increased dosage formula of hydrocodone, was released; this is so far the strongest hydrocodone formulation created for pain management, on par with a moderate dose of oxycodone .

== Analgesics ==
Analgesics are drugs that relieve pain. There are two main types: non-narcotic analgesics for mild pain, and narcotic analgesics for severe pain.

=== Narcotic analgesics ===
Narcotic analgesics tend to be opioids. They bind to opioid receptors which are G protein-coupled receptors distributed in brain, spinal cord, digestive tract, peripheral neurons.

==== Mechanism ====
There are three types of opioid receptors: mu (μ-opioid receptors), delta, and kappa (κ-opioid receptor). Endogenous opioids (enkephalins, dynorphin, endorphin) do not bind specifically to any particular opioid receptor. Receptor binding of the opioid causes a cascade leading to the channel opening and hyperpolarization of the neuron. The opioid receptors have the following channel types: mu, K^{+} channel; l delta, K^{+} channel; kappa, Ca^{2+} channel. Hyperpolarization can lead to post-synaptic neural inhibition and presynaptic inhibition of neurotransmitter release. Post-synaptic neural inhibition can reduce analgesia and central hyperactivity may reduce its efficacy. The mechanism of kappa receptors is slightly different from mu and delta, in that Ca^{2+} channels close instead of K^{+} channels, and K^{+} channels open in mu and delta.

== See also ==
- Commission on Narcotic Drugs
- East African drug trade
- Equianalgesic
- Narcoculture
- Narcoterrorism
- Narcotics Anonymous
- Opioid
- Prohibition of drugs
- War on drugs
