= Narcotics Control Board (Ghana) =

Ghanaian law enforcement agency

Agency overview
- Formed: 1993
- Jurisdiction: Republic of Ghana
- Headquarters: Ghana
- Agency executive: Francis Torkornoo, Acting Executive Secretary
- Parent agency: Ministry of Interior (Ghana)

The Narcotics Control Board (NACOB) is a Ghanaian agency under the Ministry of Interior. It is the agency concerned with the formulation and enforcement of narcotics laws in the country. The board's work is aimed at preventing the use, import, and export of narcotics.

== Functions ==
The agency has three main functions, supervised by the Interior Ministry. The functions consist of the following:

1. Enforcement and control of narcotic control laws in the country
2. Education and prevention of the use of narcotics
3. Treatment, rehabilitation and social re-integration of narcotic addicts.

The board regularly has inspectorates at various entry points of the country, particularly airports and seaports. Regular sweeps are conducted on marine vessels and on passengers at airports as part of security checks.During these inspections, if any suspected narcotic products are found, they are confiscated by the board and tested to determine their substance. The offenders are then brought before the courts to face legal proceedings. The confiscated narcotic products are subsequently destroyed to prevent their redistribution. One such burning was done in June 2010 when the board destroyed 167 kilograms of seized cocaine at the Teshie Shooting Range in Accra.

In 2009, NACOB announced a one-year campaign "to raise public awareness of the harmful effects of illicit drugs on the economic, social, political and cultural aspects of the country and its security." The campaign's theme was "Do Drugs Control Your Life?", and it featured movie screenings, TV and radio discussions, and competitions for paintings and essays. The campaign was targeted primarily at high-school juniors and seniors.

== Collaborations with other agencies ==
NACOB forms partnerships with other agencies both in and outside of Ghana. One such collaboration led to the formation of the Operation West Bridge project in 2007, which was introduced at Ghana's Accra International Airport by the UK government. This collaboration has led to the interception of illicit drugs worth 214 million British pounds since its inception.

== Successes ==
NACOB in combating narcotic drug trafficking organizes training programmes for its staff and gathers intelligence on the illicit drug trade. The result of these has been a reduction in the illicit drug trade. One of the board's successes came in 2004 when the Customs Office of the United Kingdom commended the board for seizing 42 kilograms of cocaine concealed in sacks of rice imported from Guyana at Tema Port in two 20-foot containers in September 2003.

== Challenges ==
Problems that faces the board include the lack of adequate resources as well as remuneration for law enforcement personnel.

== See also ==
- Opioid addiction in Ghana
- Ministry of Interior (Ghana)
