= United Nations Office on Drugs and Crime =

United Nations agency

- Established: 1997
- Type: Secretariat office
- Legal status: Active
- Headquarters: Vienna, Austria
- Coordinates: 48°14′0″N 16°25′1″E
- Head: Monica Juma (since 2026)
- Parent organization: United Nations Secretariat
- Staff: 2,500
- Website: www.unodc.org

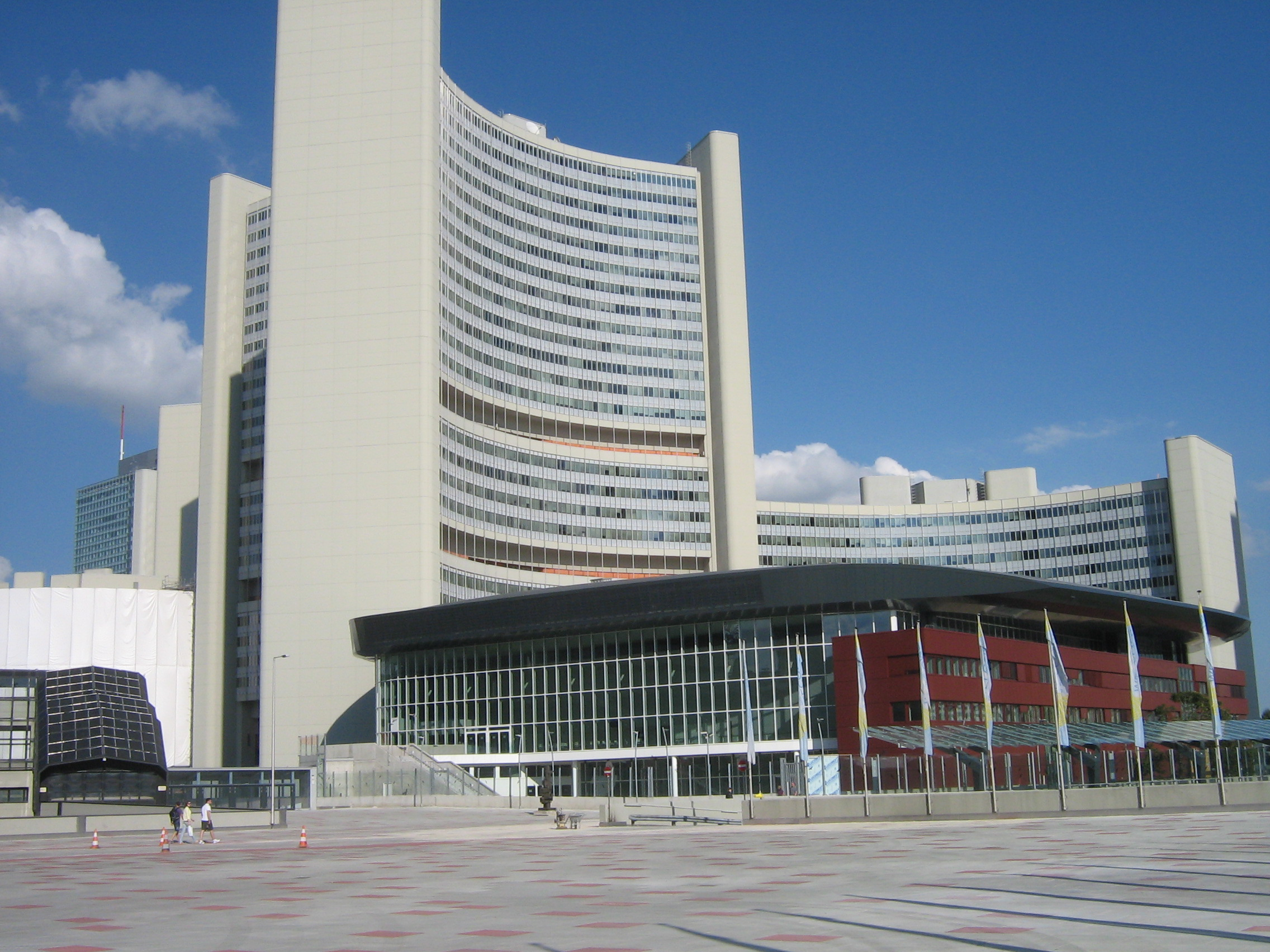
UNODC headquarters in Vienna

The United Nations Office on Drugs and Crime (UNODC; French: Office des Nations unies contre la drogue et le crime) is a United Nations office that was established in 1997 as the Office for Drug Control and Crime Prevention by combining the United Nations International Drug Control Program (UNDCP) and the Crime Prevention and Criminal Justice Division in the United Nations Office at Vienna, adopting the current name in 2002.

The agency's focus is the trafficking and abuse of illicit drugs, crime prevention and criminal justice, international terrorism, and political corruption. It is a member of the United Nations Development Group. In 2022–23, it had an estimated biannual budget of US$822 million.

== History ==
The United Nations International Drug Control Program (UNDCP) and the Crime Prevention and Criminal Justice Division in the United Nations Office at Vienna were merged to form the Office for Drug Control and Crime Prevention. This was renamed to the United Nations Office on Drugs and Crime (UNODC) in 2002.

== Organisational structure ==
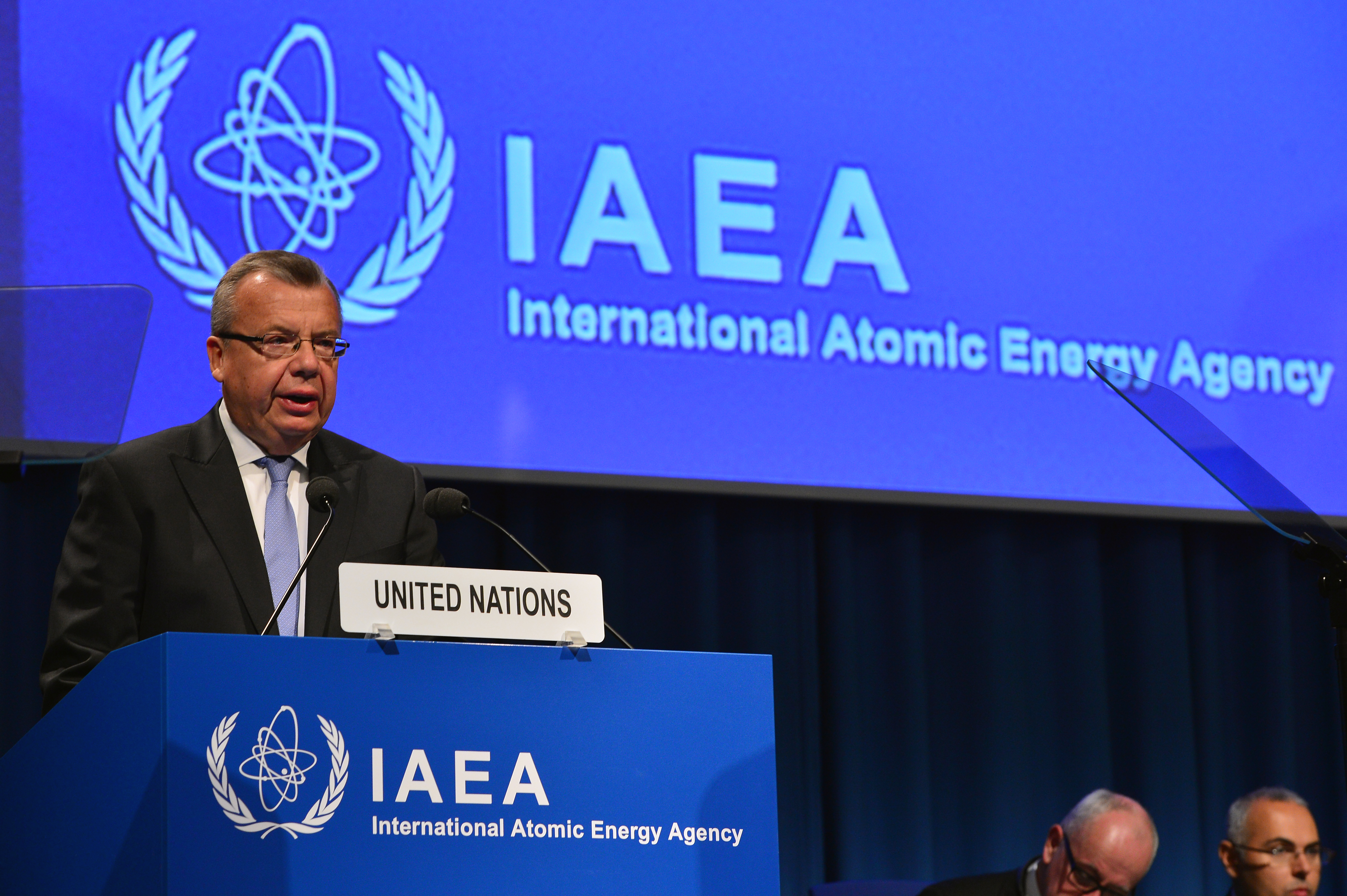
Yury Fedotov, former Director General of the United Nations Office in Vienna and former executive director of UNODC, delivers his welcome address at the first day of the 57th IAEA General Conference. M-Building, IAEA Headquarters, Vienna, Austria. 16 September 2013.

=== Locations ===
UNODC, which as of 2020 employs around 3400 people worldwide, has its headquarters in Vienna, Austria, with 115 field offices and two liaison offices in Brussels and in New York City. The United Nations Secretary-General appoints the agency's Executive Director. Yuri Fedotov, the former Russian Ambassador to the United Kingdom, held this position from 2010 until 2019, when the United Nations Secretary-General announced that Ms. Ghada Fathi Waly of Egypt would replace him as both executive director of UNODC and Director General of the United Nations Office at Vienna.

Main operating locations:

- Africa and Middle East
- Europe and West/Central Asia
- Latin America and the Caribbean
- Southeast Asia and the Pacific
- South Asia

Liaison Office(s) · Brussels · New York

=== Sub agencies ===
The United Nations Crime Prevention and Criminal Justice Programme Network (PNI) is a network consisting of UNODC as well as many crime-related institutes and other centres around the world. Its aim is to strengthen international co-operation in the areas of crime prevention and criminal justice. The network facilitates the "exchange of information, research, training and public education".

UNODC incorporates the secretariat of the International Narcotics Control Board (INCB).

UNODC's Terrorism Prevention Branch was headed by International terrorism studies expert Alex P. Schmid from 1999 to 2005.

The agency is a member of the United Nations Sustainable Development Group.

=== Budget ===
In 2022–2023 it had an estimated biannual budget of US$822 million.

== Aims and functions ==
UNODC was established to assist the UN in better addressing a coordinated, comprehensive response to the interrelated issues of illicit trafficking in and abuse of drugs, crime prevention and criminal justice, international terrorism, and political corruption. These goals are pursued through three primary functions: research, guidance and support to governments in the adoption and implementation of various crime-, drug-, terrorism-, and corruption-related conventions, treaties and protocols, as well as technical/financial assistance to said governments to face their respective situations and challenges in these fields.

The office aims long-term to better equip governments to handle drug-, crime-, terrorism-, and corruption-related issues, to maximise knowledge on these issues among governmental institutions and agencies, and also to maximise awareness of said matters in public opinion, globally, nationally and at community level. Approximately 90% of the Office's funding comes from voluntary contributions, mainly from governments.

These are the main themes that UNODC deals with: alternative development, anti-corruption, criminal justice, prison reform and crime prevention, drug prevention, treatment and care, HIV and AIDS, human trafficking and migrant smuggling, money laundering, organized crime, piracy, terrorism prevention.

== The World Drug Report ==
The World Drug Report is a yearly publication that presents a comprehensive assessment of the international drug problem, with detailed information on the illicit drug situation. It provides estimates and information on trends in the production, trafficking and use of opium/heroin, coca/cocaine, cannabis and amphetamine-type stimulants. The Report, based on data and estimates collected or prepared by Governments, UNODC and other international institutions, attempts to identify trends in the evolution of global illicit drug markets.

Through the World Drug Report, UNODC aims to enhance member states' understanding of global illicit drug trends and increase their awareness of the need for the more systematic collection and reporting of data relating to illicit drugs.

== Treaties ==
United Nations Conventions and their related Protocols underpin all the operational work of UNODC.

=== Crime-related treaties ===
==== United Nations Convention against Transnational Organized Crime ====
The convention is a legally binding instrument that entered into force on 29 September 2003, through which States parties commit to taking a series of measures against transnational organized crime. States that ratify the convention has the duty of creation of domestic offences to combat the problem, the adoption of new, sweeping frameworks for mutual legal assistance, extradition, law enforcement cooperation, technical assistance and training. The convention signifies an important stage in dealing with transnational crime by recognizing the seriousness of the problem that the crime poses, and gaining understanding from the member states of the importance of a cooperative measure. The convention is complemented by three different protocols:

- the Protocol to Prevent, Suppress and Punish Trafficking in Persons, especially Women and Children;
- the Protocol against the Smuggling of Migrants by Land, Sea and Air; and
- the Protocol against the Illicit Manufacturing of and Trafficking in Firearms, their Parts and Components and Ammunition.

The Protocol to Prevent, Suppress and Punish Trafficking in Persons, especially Women and Children aims to provide a convergence in the states' domestic offences in the investigation and the persecution process. Another objective of the protocol is to protect the victims of trafficking in persons with full respect.

The Protocol against the Smuggling of Migrants by Land, Sea and Air is concerned with the aggravating problem of organized crime groups for smuggling persons. The protocol aims to combat and prevent transnational smuggling as well as to promote cooperative measures for enhancing protective measures for victims.

The Protocol against the Illicit Manufacturing of and Trafficking in Firearms, their Parts and Components and Ammunition was adopted to prevent and provide a cooperative measure for illicit manufacturing of and trafficking in firearms, their parts and components and ammunition. By adopting the protocol, the member states commit to adopt domestic criminal offences for illegal manufacturing, providing governmental licensing ammunition, and keeping track of the ammunition.

==== United Nations Convention against Corruption ====
In its resolution 55/61, the General Assembly recognized that an effective international legal instrument against corruption, independent of the United Nations Convention against Transnational Organized Crime was desirable. The text of the convention was negotiated during seven sessions held between 21 January 2002 and 1 October 2003. The convention was adopted by the General Assembly on 31 October 2003. In 2003, the United Nations adopted the UN Convention against Corruption (UNCAC). The Convention came into force in December 2005. As of 9 November 2012, 140 countries had signed and 164 countries (States Parties) had ratified the UNCAC. UNODC serves as the Secretariat for the Conference of the States Parties (CoSP) to the UNCAC.

UNCAC is a legally binding instrument (perhaps the only anti-corruption legally binding global instrument). A highlight of UNCAC is the inclusion of a specific chapter on asset recovery which aimed at returning assets to their rightful owners including countries from which they had been taken illicitly.

UNODC, as the custodian of UNCAC, is also one of the main initiators of the establishment of the International Anti-Corruption Academy (IACA), whose main function is to, among other things, facilitate more effective implementation of the UNCAC.

=== Drug-related treaties ===
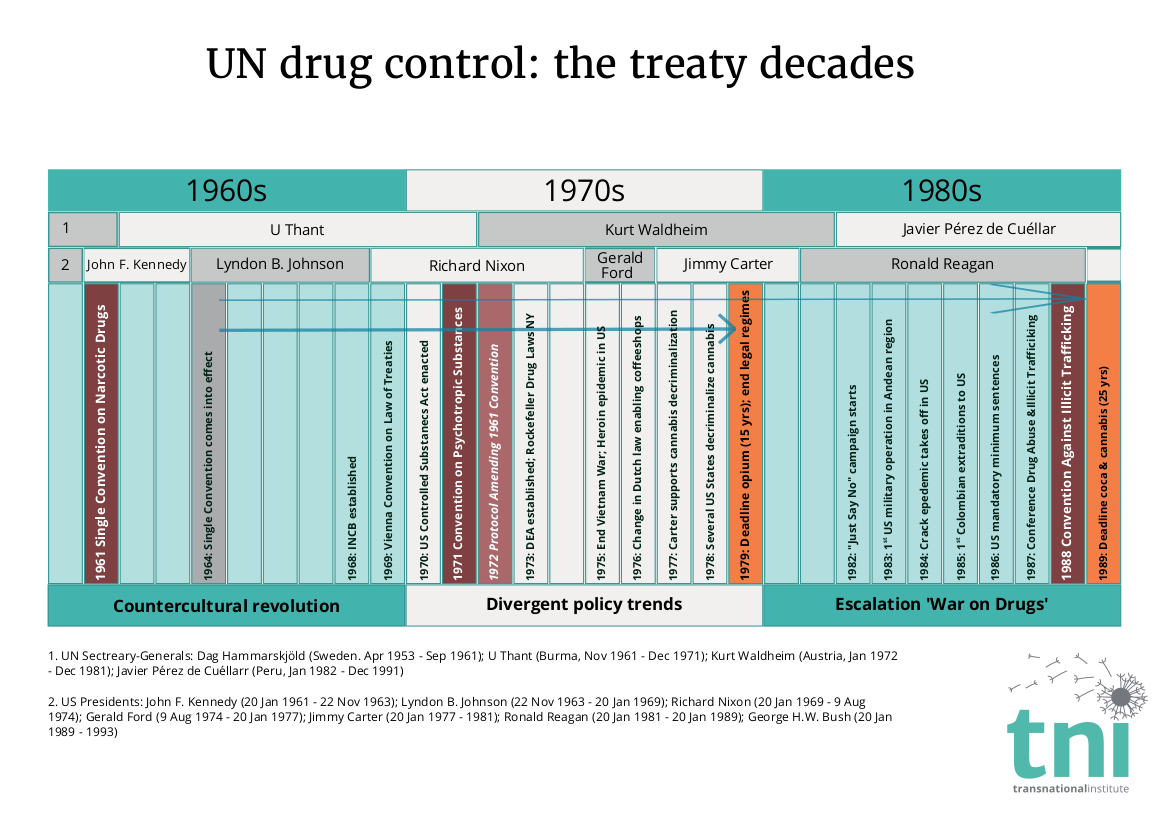
Timeline of the three drug-related treaties

There are three drug related treaties that guide UNODC's drug related programs. These are: The Single Convention on Narcotic Drugs of 1961 as amended by the 1972 Protocol; the Convention on Psychotropic Substances of 1971 and the United Nations Convention Against Illicit Traffic in Narcotic Drugs and Psychotropic Substances of 1988.

These three major international drug control treaties are mutually supportive and complementary. An important purpose of the first two treaties is to codify internationally applicable control measures in order to ensure the availability of narcotic drugs and psychotropic substances for medical and scientific purposes, and to prevent their diversion into illicit channels. They also include general provisions on trafficking and drug abuse.

== Campaigns ==
UNODC launches campaigns to raise awareness of drugs and crime problems. On 26 June every year, UNODC marks the International Day against Drug Abuse and Illicit Trafficking. On 9 December every year, UNODC commemorates the International Anti-Corruption Day.

=== "Do Drugs Control Your Life?" – World Drug Campaign ===
The United Nations Office on Drugs and Crime (UNODC) started this international campaign to raise awareness about the major challenge that illicit drugs represent to society as a whole, and especially to the young. The goal of the campaign is to mobilize support and to inspire people to act against drug abuse and trafficking. The campaign encourages young people to put their health first and not to take drugs.

=== "Your No Counts" – International Anti-Corruption Campaign ===
The United Nations Office on Drugs and Crime (UNODC) has teamed up with the United Nations Development Program (UNDP) to run this campaign as a focus on how corruption hinders efforts to achieve the internationally agreed upon MDGs, undermines democracy and the rule of law, leads to human rights violations, distorts markets, erodes quality of life and allows organized crime, terrorism and other threats to human security to flourish.

=== "Think AIDS" – World AIDS Campaign ===
Young people aged 15 to 24 account for an estimated 40 per cent of new adult (15+) HIV infections worldwide. In some parts of the world, and in some marginalized sub-groups, the most frequent modes of HIV transmission for these young people are unsafe injecting drug use and unsafe sexual activities.

Because young people are also often more likely to use drugs, The United Nations Office on Drugs and Crime (UNODC) targets this population with a campaign to raise awareness about drug use and its connection to the spread of HIV and AIDS. The slogan: "Think Before You Start ... Before You Shoot ... Before You Share" is used to provoke young people to consider the implications of using drugs, and particularly injecting drugs.

=== Blue Heart Campaign Against Human Trafficking ===
The Blue Heart Campaign seeks to encourage involvement and action to help stop trafficking in persons. The campaign also allows people to show solidarity with the victims of human trafficking by wearing the Blue Heart. The use of the blue UN colour demonstrates the commitment of the United Nations to combat this crime.

== Criticism ==
In 2007, the five largest donors to UNODC's budget in descending order were: European Union, Canada, United States, the UN itself, and Finland. According to the Transnational Institute this explains why, until recently, UNODC did not promote harm reduction policies like needle exchange and heroin-assisted treatment. (This despite the actions of the Organization's bodies that support these policies, such as the WHO and UNAIDS.) UNODC promotes other methods for drug use prevention, treatment and care that UNODC sees as "based on scientific evidence and on ethical standards". The UNODC has been criticized by human rights organizations such as Amnesty International for not promoting the inclusion of adherence to international human rights standards within its project in Iran, where there are "serious concerns regarding unfair trials and executions of those suspected of drug offences."

UNODC has signed a partnership with the controversial Rule of Law and Anti-Corruption Center, which was founded by Ali bin Fetais Al-Marri, the General-Prosecutor of Qatar.

== See also ==
- Blue Heart Campaign Against Human Trafficking
- CARICC, Central Asian Regional Information and Coordination Centre
- Convention against Transnational Organized Crime, 2000
- Convention on Psychotropic Substances, 1971
- Drug policy
- European Monitoring Centre for Drugs and Drug Addiction EMCDDA
- International Anti-Corruption Academy
- International Narcotics Control Board (INCB)
- ISO 37001 Anti-bribery management systems
- Illegal drug trade in Latin America (Maritime)
- Network Against Child Trafficking, Abuse and Labour
- Protocol against the Illicit Manufacturing and Trafficking in Firearms
- Protocol against the Smuggling of Migrants by Land, Sea and Air, 2004
- Protocol to Prevent, Suppress and Punish Trafficking in Persons, especially Women and Children, 2003
- Single Convention on Narcotic Drugs, 1961
- United Nations Congress on Crime Prevention and Criminal Justice
- United Nations Convention against Corruption
- United Nations Convention Against Illicit Traffic in Narcotic Drugs and Psychotropic Substances, 1988
- West Africa Coast Initiative
