= Protocol Against the Smuggling of Migrants by Land, Sea and Air =

Protocol Against the Smuggling of Migrants by Land, Sea and Air, supplementing the United Nations Convention against Transnational Organized Crime
- Type: Organized crime; international criminal law
- Drafted: 15 November 2000
- Signed: 12 December 2000
- Location: New York City, United States
- Effective: 28 January 2004
- Condition: 40 ratifications
- Signatories: 112
- Parties: 151
- Depositary: Secretary-General of the United Nations
- Languages: Arabic, Chinese, English, French, Russian, and Spanish

The Protocol Against the Smuggling of Migrants by Land, Sea and Air, supplementing the Convention against Transnational Organised Crime, was adopted by the United Nations General Assembly in 2000. It is also referred to as the Smuggling Protocol. It is one of the three Palermo protocols, the others being the Protocol to Prevent, Suppress and Punish Trafficking in Persons, especially Women and Children and the Protocol against the Illicit Manufacturing and Trafficking in Firearms, Their Parts and Components and Ammunition.

The Smuggling Protocol entered into force on 28 January 2004. As of October 2022, the protocol has been signed by 112 parties and ratified by 151.

The Protocol is aimed at the protection of rights of migrants and the reduction of the power and influence of organized criminal groups that abuse migrants. It emphasizes the need to provide migrants with humane treatment, and the need for comprehensive international approaches to combating people smuggling, including socio-economic measures that address the root causes of migration.

The Protocol requires States Parties that have ratified to ensure that migrant smuggling (also called people smuggling) is criminalised in accordance with its terms, and those set out in the Convention on Transnational Organised Crime.

Given the current political priority around people smuggling, it is perhaps surprising that a concerted international focus on defining and responding to migrant smuggling only occurred in the 1990s. This focus followed sharp rises in irregular migration to the United States, and to Europe in the 1980s and 90s. A focus on those who facilitate irregular migration – rather than migrants themselves – was seen as a critical element of any response. The resulting legal framework was the Protocol against the Smuggling of Migrants by Land, Sea and Air (Migrant Smuggling Protocol), that supplements the parent instrument, the United Nations Convention against Transnational Organized Crime.

The Migrant Smuggling Protocol does not provide a complete or self-contained legal regime but instead exists as part of a "dense web of rights, obligations and responsibilities drawn not just from the Protocol and Convention but also from the law of the sea, human rights law, and refugee law."

Unlike human trafficking, people smuggling is characterized by the consent between customer and smuggler – a contractual agreement that typically terminates upon arrival in the destination location. However, smuggling situations can nonetheless in reality descend into situations that can best be described as extreme human rights abuses, with smuggled migrants subject to threats, abuse, exploitation and torture, and even death at the hands of smugglers (see for example, case studies in Gallagher and David, International Law of Migrant Smuggling, 2014, 9–10).

== See also ==
- Human trafficking
- Illegal immigration
- People smuggling

== Notes ==
broken link
