= Protocol Against the Illicit Manufacturing of and Trafficking in Firearms =

Treaty on anti-arms trafficking

Protocol Against the Illicit Manufacturing of and Trafficking in Firearms, Their Parts and Components and Ammunition, supplementing the United Nations Convention against Transnational Organized Crime
- Signed and ratified or acceded Only signed Non-party
- Type: Organized crime; international criminal law
- Drafted: 31 May 2001
- Signed: 11 July 2001
- Location: New York, United States
- Effective: 3 July 2005
- Condition: 40 ratifications
- Signatories: 52
- Parties: 122
- Depositary: Secretary-General of the United Nations
- Languages: Arabic, Chinese, English, French, Russian, and Spanish

The Protocol Against the Illicit Manufacturing and Trafficking in Firearms, Their Parts and Components and Ammunition (Firearms Protocol) is a treaty on anti-arms trafficking including small arms and light weapons that is supplemental to the Convention against Transnational Organized Crime. It is one of the so-called Palermo protocols.

The Protocol was adopted by the United Nations General Assembly as Resolution 55/255 on 31 May 2001; the treaty entered into force on 3 July 2005. It was signed by 52 parties and as of October 2022 it has 122 parties, including the European Union.

The states that have signed the protocol but have not yet ratified it are Australia, Canada, China, Iceland, Japan, Monaco, Seychelles, and United Kingdom. As February 2022, among the top six arms exporting countries, only France (since February 2019) and Germany (since October 2021) have ratified the protocol. The other four—United States, Russia, China, and United Kingdom—have not.
