= United Nations Convention Against Transnational Organized Crime =

United Nations treaty against crime

- Signed and ratified or acceded Only signed Non-party
- Type: Organized crime; international criminal law
- Drafted: 15 November 2000
- Signed: 12 December 2000
- Location: Palermo, Italy
- Effective: 29 September 2003
- Condition: 40 ratifications
- Signatories: 147
- Parties: 193
- Depositary: Secretary-General of the United Nations
- Languages: Arabic, Chinese, English, French, Russian, and Spanish

The United Nations Convention Against Transnational Organized Crime (UNTOC, also called the Palermo Convention) is a 2000 United Nations-sponsored multilateral treaty against transnational organized crime.

== History ==
The convention was adopted by a resolution of the United Nations General Assembly on 15 November 2000.

The Convention came into force on 29 September 2003. According to Leoluca Orlando, Mayor of Palermo, the convention was the first international convention to fight transnational organized crime, trafficking of human beings, and terrorism.

In 2014, the UNTOC strengthened its policies regarding wildlife smuggling. Botswana signed the Anti-Human Trafficking Act of 2014 to comply with UNTOC on the human smuggling protocol.

In 2017, as Japan prepared the organization of the 2019 Rugby World Cup, and the 2020 Summer Olympics and Paralympics, it faced the issue of not being fully compliant with the UNTOC, thus jeopardizing its eligibility to organize those events.

In February 2018, Afghanistan introduced a new penal code which made the country's laws UNTOC-compliant for the first time.

== Description ==
UNTOC's three supplementary protocols (the Palermo Protocols) are:

- Protocol to Prevent, Suppress and Punish Trafficking in Persons, Especially Women and Children.
- Protocol Against the Smuggling of Migrants by Land, Sea and Air.
- Protocol Against the Illicit Manufacturing of and Trafficking in Firearms.

All four of these instruments contain elements of the current international law on human trafficking, arms trafficking and money laundering. The United Nations Office on Drugs and Crime (UNODC) acts as custodian of the UNTOC and its protocols.

The UNTOC is the main legal international instrument to fight organized crime, but its efficiency depends on each member's ability to implement the organization's framework. As an example, the UNTOC requires a minimum sentence of four years imprisonment for transnational organised criminal offences.

== Parties ==
As of July 2025, it has 193 parties, which includes 187 United Nations member states, the Cook Islands, the Holy See, Niue, the State of Palestine, and the European Union. The four UN member states that are not party to the convention are (* indicates that the state has signed but not ratified the convention):

- Republic of the Congo*
- Papua New Guinea
- Solomon Islands
- Tuvalu

In June 2018, the Iranian Parliament approved the bill to join the UNTOC. The bill was initially blocked by the country's Expediency Discernment Council, until May 2025 when it was eventually approved upon further review.

== See also ==
- European Public Prosecutor
- International Criminal Police Organization
- ISO 37001 Anti-bribery management systems
- United Nations Convention against Corruption
