= Optional Protocol on the Sale of Children, Child Prostitution and Child Pornography =

2002 protocol of the UN Convention on the Rights of the Child

- State parties States that have signed, but not ratified States that have not signed
- Signed: 25 May 2000
- Location: New York
- Effective: 18 January 2002
- Condition: 10 ratifications
- Signatories: 122
- Parties: 178
- Depositary: UN Secretary-General
- Languages: Arabic, Chinese, English, French, Russian & Spanish

The Optional Protocol on the Sale of Children, Child Prostitution and Child Pornography is a protocol to the Convention on the Rights of the Child and requires parties to prohibit the sale of children, child prostitution and child pornography.

The Protocol was adopted by the United Nations General Assembly in 2000 and entered into force on 18 January 2002. As of April 2024, 178 states are party to the protocol.

According to the preamble, the protocol is intended to achieve the purposes of certain articles in the Convention on the Rights of the Child, where the rights are defined with the provision that parties should take "appropriate measures" to protect them. Article 1 of the protocol requires parties to protect the rights and interests of child victims of trafficking, child prostitution and child pornography, child labour and especially the worst forms of child labour.

The remaining articles in the protocol outline the standards for international law enforcement covering diverse issues such as jurisdictional factors, extradition, mutual assistance in investigations, criminal or extradition proceedings and seizure and confiscation of assets as well.

It also obliges parties to pass laws within their own territories against these practices "punishable by appropriate penalties that take into account their grave nature."

== Definitions ==
The Protocol requires parties to prohibit the sale of children, child prostitution and child pornography. Article 2 defines the prohibition:

- Sale of children – Any act or transaction whereby a child is transferred by any person or group of persons to another for remuneration or any other consideration.
- Child prostitution – Use of a child in sexual activities for remuneration or any other form of consideration.
- Child pornography – Any representation, by whatever means, of a child engaged in real or simulated explicit sexual activities or any representation of the sexual parts of a child for primarily sexual purposes.

The Convention generally defines a child as any human being under the age of 18, unless an earlier age of majority is recognized by a country's law.

== Parties and reservations ==
List of countries that are parties to the protocol as of October 2022:

Afghanistan; Albania; Algeria; Andorra; Angola; Antigua and Barbuda; Argentina; Armenia; Australia; Austria; Azerbaijan; Bahamas; Bahrain; Bangladesh; Belarus; Belgium; Belize; Benin; Bhutan; Bolivia; Bosnia and Herzegovina; Botswana; Brazil; Brunei Darussalam; Bulgaria; Burkina Faso; Burundi; Cabo Verde; Cambodia; Cameroon; Canada; Central African Republic; Chad; Chile; China; Colombia; Comoros; Congo; Costa Rica; Côte d'Ivoire; Croatia; Cuba; Cyprus; Czech Republic; Democratic People's Republic of Korea; Democratic Republic of the Congo; Denmark; Djibouti; Dominica; Dominican Republic; Ecuador; Egypt; El Salvador; Equatorial Guinea; Eritrea; Estonia; Eswatini; Ethiopia; Fiji; Finland; France; Gabon; Gambia; Georgia; Germany; Ghana; Greece; Grenada; Guatemala; Guinea; Guinea-Bissau; Guyana; Haiti; Holy See; Honduras; Hungary; Iceland; India; Indonesia; Iran; Iraq; Israel; Italy; Jamaica; Japan; Jordan; Kazakhstan; Kenya; Kiribati; Kuwait; Kyrgyzstan; Lao People's Democratic Republic; Latvia; Lebanon; Lesotho; Liberia; Libya; Liechtenstein; Lithuania; Luxembourg; Madagascar; Malawi; Malaysia; Maldives; Mali; Malta; Marshall Islands; Mauritania; Mauritius; Mexico; Micronesia (Federated States of); Monaco; Mongolia; Montenegro; Morocco; Mozambique; Myanmar; Namibia; Nauru; Nepal; Netherlands; New Zealand; Nicaragua; Niger; Nigeria; North Macedonia; Norway; Oman; Pakistan; Panama; Paraguay; Peru; Philippines; Poland; Portugal; Qatar; Ireland; Republic of Korea; Republic of Moldova; Romania; Russian Federation; Rwanda; Samoa; San Marino; Saudi Arabia; Senegal; Serbia; Seychelles; Sierra Leone; Slovakia; Slovenia; Solomon Islands; South Africa; South Sudan; Spain; Sri Lanka; St. Lucia; St. Vincent and the Grenadines; State of Palestine; Sudan; Suriname; Sweden; Switzerland; Syrian Arab Republic; Tajikistan; Thailand; Timor-Leste; Togo; Tunisia; Turkey; Turkmenistan; Uganda; Ukraine; United Arab Emirates; United Kingdom of Great Britain and Northern Ireland; United Republic of Tanzania; United States of America; Uruguay; Uzbekistan; Vanuatu; Venezuela; Viet Nam; Yemen; Zambia; Zimbabwe

=== Reservations and territorial application ===
==== China ====
In China's ratification, the Hong Kong Special Administrative Region was excluded, but the Macao Special Administrative Region was included.

==== Denmark ====
On ratification on 24 July 2003, Denmark excluded the territories of the Faroe Islands and Greenland. This exclusion was withdrawn on 10 October 2016.

==== Netherlands ====
Initially the ratification only applied to the European part of the Netherlands. On 17 October 2006, it was extended to Aruba, on 10 October 2010, to the Caribbean part of the Netherlands (Bonaire, Sint Eustatius and Saba) and on 20 September 2022 to Curaçao. The convention does not apply to Sint Maarten.

==== New Zealand ====
New Zealand's ratification excluded the islands of Tokelau.

==== Qatar ====
Qatar added in its signing statement that it was "subject to a general reservation regarding any provisions in the protocol that are in conflict with the Islamic Shariah." Objections to this reservation were registered in the signing statements by Austria, France, Germany, Norway, Spain and Sweden. Qatar withdrew the reservation on 18 June 2008, and currently has no reservations to the Protocol.

==== United Kingdom ====
The United Kingdom's original ratification was only applicable to the UK and not the Crown dependencies or dependent territories. On 29 April 2014, the Bailiwick of Jersey and on 4 November 2020, Guernsey and Alderney were included.

==== Vietnam ====
On ratification, Vietnam included reservations regarding article 5 (1), (2), (3), and (4) of the protocol (which relate to the extradition of those who have offended under the protocol). The reservation were withdrawn on 26 March 2009.

=== Definitions of child pornography ===
Belgium and the US have defined child pornography in regards to the protocol as "visual representation of a child engaged in real or simulated sexual activities or of the genitalia of a child where the dominant characteristic is depiction for a sexual purpose".

Denmark and Malaysia's definition in their protocol declarations is "any visual representation".

Sweden has clarified its interpretation of child pornography as applying only to the visual representation of sexual acts with a minor, and not applying to adults acting, posing, or dressing, as a minor.

== See also ==
- Council of Europe Convention on the Protection of Children against Sexual Exploitation and Sexual Abuse
- Special Rapporteur on the sale of children, child prostitution and child pornography
