= Child exploitation =

Child exploitation may refer to:

- Crime#Child criminal exploitation
- Child labour
- Child sexual abuse
- Child sexual exploitation
