= Child trafficking =

Form of human trafficking

Child trafficking is a form of human trafficking and is defined by the United Nations as the "recruitment, transportation, harbouring, or receipt of a child" for the purpose of slavery, forced labour, and sexual exploitation. This definition is substantially broader than the same document's definition of "trafficking in persons". Children may also be trafficked for illegal adoption. Illegal adoptions violate multiple child rights norms and principles, including the best interests of the child, the principle of subsidiarity and the prohibition of improper financial gain. According to the anti-trafficking organization Love146, it is estimated that over three million children worldwide are being victimized in sex trafficking and child labour.

In 2012, the United Nations Office on Drugs and Crime (UNODC) reported the percentage of child victims had risen in 3 years from 20 percent to 27 percent. In 2014, research conducted by the anti-human trafficking organization Thorn, reported that internet sites like Craigslist are often used as tools for conducting business within the industry and that 70 percent of child sex trafficking survivors surveyed were at some point sold online. In 2016 NGO ERASE Child Trafficking estimated 300,000 children are taken from all around the world and sold by human traffickers as slaves.

In 2020, the United Nations noted that between 18,000 and 20,000 children were identified as trafficked globally (with regional variations); however, the challenges of lax reporting and accurate detection mean this number is certainly a bare minimum. Children in North and Sub-Saharan Africa make up the majority of trafficked victims with forced labour most common in Sub-Saharan Africa. Most child traffic victims in Central America and the Caribbean are girls, primarily consisting of teenagers trafficked for sexual exploitation, while in South Asia, nearly half of the victims are children, where the victims are exploited for labour or forced into marriage.

In 2022, the European Commission noted that just over 10,000 people were identified as being trafficked into the European Union in one year; of these 15% were children (approximately 75% are girls). This number represents a 41% increase from 2021, perhaps because of efforts to increase awareness of vulnerability to trafficking of those fleeing military aggression against Ukraine.

In 2022, the USA issued certification letters and assistance letters to 2,264 non-US children (a significant increase from 1,143 in FY 2021 and 672 in FY 2020, which may have been impacted by COVID); it noted that all of them had experienced labor trafficking, sex trafficking or both.

The trafficking of children has been internationally recognized as a serious crime that exists in every region of the world and which often has human rights implications. Yet, it is only since 2002 that the prevalence and ramifications of this practice have risen to international prominence, due to a dramatic increase in research and public action. Limited research has not yet identified all causes of child trafficking, however, it appears that poverty, humanitarian crisis, and lack of education contribute to high rates. A variety of potential solutions have accordingly been suggested and implemented, which can be categorized into four types of action: broad protection, prevention, law enforcement, and victim assistance.

The main international documents dealing with the trafficking of children are the 1989 UN Convention on the Rights of the Child, the 1999 ILO Worst Forms of Child Labour Convention, and the 2000 UN Protocol to Prevent, Suppress and Punish Trafficking in Persons, Especially Women and Children.

== Definition ==
The first major international instrument dealing with the trafficking of children is part of the 2000 UN Palermo protocols, titled the Protocol to Prevent, Suppress and Punish Trafficking in Persons, Especially Women and Children. Article 3(a) of this document defines child trafficking as the "recruitment, transportation, transfer, harboring and/or receipt" of a child for the purpose of exploitation. The definition for child trafficking given here applies only to cases of trafficking that are transnational and/or involve organized criminal groups; in spite of this, child trafficking is now typically recognized well outside these parameters. The ILO expands upon this definition by asserting that movement and exploitation are key aspects of child trafficking. The definition of "child" used here is that listed in the 1989 UN Convention on the Rights of the Child which states: "child means every human being below the age of 18 years, unless, under the law applicable to the child, majority is attained earlier." The distinction outlined in this definition is important, because some countries have chosen to set the "age of majority" lower than 18, thus influencing what exactly legally constitutes child trafficking.

=== Related legal instruments ===
Many international, regional, and national instruments deal with the trafficking of children. These instruments are used to define what legally constitutes trafficking of children, such that appropriate legal action can be taken against those who engage in and promote this practice. These legal instruments are called by a variety of terms, including conventions, protocols, memorandums, joint actions, recommendations, and declarations. The most significant instruments are listed below.

==== International human rights instruments ====
These legal instruments were developed by the UN in an effort to protect international human rights and, more specifically, children's rights.

- Universal Declaration of Human Rights, 1948
- Convention on the Rights of the Child, 1989

==== Labour and migration treaties ====
The trafficking of children often involves both labour and migration. As such, these international frameworks clarify instances in which these practices are illegal.

- ILO Minimum Age Convention, 1973
- ILO Worst Forms of Child Labour Convention, 1999
  - ILO Worst Forms of Child Labour Recommendation No. 190, 1999
- ILO Forced Labour Convention, 1930
- ILO Migration for Employment Convention (Revised), 1949
- United Nations Convention on the Protection of the Rights of All Migrant Workers and Members of Their Families, 1990

==== Trafficking-specific instruments ====
- Protocol to Prevent, Suppress and Punish Trafficking in Persons, Especially Women and Children, 2000
- The Recommended Principles and Guidelines on Human Rights and Human Trafficking, 2002
- Hague Convention on the Protection of Children and Cooperation in regard to Intercountry Adoption

==== Regional instruments ====
A variety of regional instruments have also been developed to guide countries in decisions regarding child trafficking. Below are some of the major instruments, though many others exist:

- Council of Europe Convention on Action against Trafficking in Human Beings (Treaty series No.197), 2005
- Communication to the European Parliament and the Council, COM(2005) 514 Final
- Multilateral cooperation agreement to combat trafficking in persons, especially women and children, in West and Central Africa, 2006
- Mekong sub regional cooperation agreement to fight human trafficking (COMMIT), 2004

==== National law ====
National laws pertaining to child trafficking continue to develop worldwide, based on the international principles that have been established. Anti-trafficking legislation has been lauded as critical by the United Nations Global Initiative to Fight Human Trafficking, because it ensures that traffickers and trafficking victims are treated accordingly: for example, "if migration laws are used to pursue traffickers, it is often the case that the victims too are prosecuted as illegal migrants, whereas if there is a specific category of 'trafficker' and 'trafficked person,' then it is more likely that the victim will be treated as such." The existence of national laws regarding child trafficking also enables trafficking victims and/or their families to take appropriate civil action.

== Types of child trafficking ==
The intended or actual after-sale use of the child is not always known.

=== Forced labour ===
The objective of child trafficking is often forced child labour. According to UNICEF approximately 160 million children were subjected to child labour at the beginning of 2020. This accounts for nearly 1 in 10 children worldwide with nearly 79 million involved in hazardous work directly endangering their health and development. Within this number, the ILO reports that 70% of child workers work in agriculture, an increase of 10% over the last decade. A comparative study between domestic child labour rates in urban and rural regions in sub-Saharan Africa revealed that in 2010 84.3% of child labourers were working in the rural sector. 99.8% of children age five to fourteen are engaged in child labour for some form of economic activity in these regions. The 2020 report found that in sub-Saharan Africa more than 81% of children in child labour were working for their own families, while 8% worked as employees for third parties and the remaining 10% for worked for their own account with greater impact on boys in every age group in the 2020 study. Overall, child labour can take many forms, including domestic servitude, work in agriculture, service, and manufacturing industries. Also, according to several researchers, most children are forced into cheap and controllable labour, and work in homes, farms, factories, restaurants, and much more. Children are cheap labour and additionally are able to complete jobs that adults cannot due to their size. One example for this is within the fishing industry in Ghana. Children can release fish easier from nets due to their small hands. Thereby their services are highly demanded and child labour remains a present consequence of child trafficking. Need citation

Trafficked children may be sexually exploited, used in the armed forces and drug trades, and in child begging. In terms of global trends, the ILO estimates that in 2004–2008, there was a 3% reduction in the incidence of child labour; this stands in contrast to a previous ILO report which found that in 2000–2004, there was a 10% reduction in child labour. The ILO contends that, globally, child labour is slowly declining, except in sub-Saharan Africa, where the number of child workers has remained relatively constant: 1 in 4 children aged 5–17 work in this region. In 2018 UNICEF reported that 31% of total child labour is located in West Africa. In this region, one in six children between the ages of six and fourteen is working. The report additionally finds that 43% of child labour in Sub-Saharan Africa is due to child migration and trafficking. Another major global trend concerns the number of child labourers in the 15–17 age group: in the past five years, a 20% increase in the number of these child workers has been reported. A surprising example occurred in the United States as McCabe indicates that in the 1990s, huge companies such as Gap and Nike were using industry "sweatshops" that used trafficked children to make their desired products. After further investigation of the child labour scandal the hazardous work conditions of the GAP company factories were exposed. Children were working in poorly maintained and dangerous factories, were victims of abuse and were paid far below minimum wage. In the years that followed similar scandals were revealed in other parts of Asia and Africa.

Responding to these cases members of the Secretary-General of the United Nations attempted to reduce the number of violations within corporate systems in 2011 by implementing the United Nations "Protect, Respect and Remedy" Framework, a report stating the guiding principles on transnational corporations and other business enterprises and human rights. Endorsed in Resolution 17/4 by the Human Rights Council on June 16, 2011, the report outlines three main principles. 1) The state's existing obligation to respect, protect and fulfill human rights and fundamental freedoms, 2) the role of business enterprises as specialized organs of society performing specialized functions, required to comply with all applicable laws and to respect human rights, and 3) the need for rights and obligations to be matched to appropriate and effective remedies when breached. The resolution attempted to establish a universal understanding of appropriate employment conditions and stated punishments for those firms who violate the guiding principles. In addition, research regarding the lasting consequences for labour whose rights were violated were revealed. Yet in 2018 it was found that still, 218 million children are working full-time, many of which are employed by factory owners to lower production costs.

=== Sexual exploitation ===
The Optional Protocol on the Sale of Children, Child Prostitution and Child Pornography is a protocol of the Convention on the Rights of the Child, formally adopted by the UN in 2000. Essentially, this protocol formally requires states to prohibit the sale of children, child prostitution, and child pornography. According to the ILO, sexual exploitation of children includes all of the following practices and activities:

- "The use of girls and boys in sexual activities remunerated in cash or in kind (commonly known as child prostitution) in the streets or indoors, in such places as brothels, discotheques, massage parlours, bars, hotels, restaurants, etc."
- "The trafficking of girls and boys and adolescents for the sex trade"
- "Child sex tourism"
- "The production, promotion and distribution of pornography involving children"
- "The use of children in sex shows (public or private)"

Though measuring the extent of this practice is difficult due to its criminal and covert nature, the ILO estimates that there are as many as 1.8 million children sexually trafficked worldwide, while UNICEF's 2006 State of the World's Children Report reports this number to be 2 million. The ILO has found that girls involved in other forms of child labour—such as domestic service or street vending—are at the highest risk of being pulled into commercial child sex trafficking. Likewise, Kendall and Funk justifies how "young girls age 12 and under are malleable and more easily trained into their prospective roles as prostitutes, and because virginity is highly prized by certain consumers willing to pay a premium".A variety of sources, including the ILO and scholars Erin Kunze and D.M. Hughes, also contend that the increased use and availability of the Internet has served as a major resource for traffickers, ultimately increasing the incidence of child sex trafficking. In fact, in 2009, Illinois Sheriff Thomas J. Dart sued the owners of Craigslist, a popular online classifieds website, for its "allowance" and "facilitation" of prostitution, particularly in children. In response to public and legal pressure, Craigslist has since blocked all access to its "Adult Services" section.

=== Children in armed forces ===
The Optional Protocol on the Involvement of Children in Armed Conflict is a protocol of the Convention on the Rights of the Child, formally adopted by the UN in 2000. Essentially, the protocol states that while volunteers below the age of 18 can voluntarily join the armed forces, they cannot be conscripted. As the protocol reads, "State parties shall take all feasible measures to ensure that member of their armed forces who have not attained the age of 18 years do not take a direct part in hostilities." Despite this, the ILO estimated in 2012 that "tens of thousands" of girls and boys were forcibly enlisted in the armed forces in at least 17 countries around the world. Children conscripted into the armed forces can then be used in three distinct ways:

- Direct roles in hostilities (combat roles)
- Supporting roles (such as messengers or spies)
- For political advantage (such as for propaganda purposes)

Recent research conducted by the Coalition to Stop the Use of Child Soldiers has also noted that girl soldiers must be uniquely recognized, in that they are especially vulnerable to acts of sexual violence. The incidence of child soldiers was the focus of the Kony 2012 movement, that aimed to arrest Joseph Kony, a Ugandan war criminal who is responsible for the trafficking of thousands of child soldiers and sex slaves.

=== Children in drug trades ===
Children are also used in drug trades in all regions of the world. Specifically, children are often trafficked into exploitation as either drug couriers or dealers, and then 'paid' in drugs, such that they become addicted and further entrapped. Due to the illicit nature of drug trafficking, children who are apprehended are often treated as criminals, when in reality they are often the ones in need of legal assistance. While comprehensive worldwide statistics regarding the prevalence of this practice are unknown, several useful regional studies have been conducted. For example, the ILO has investigated the use of Afghan children in the heroin trade and child involvement in the drug trades of Brazil. Scholar Luke Dowdney specifically studied children in the drug trade in Rio de Janeiro, Brazil; he found that children involved in the drug trades are at significantly higher risk of engaging in violence, particularly murder.

=== Adoption ===
Children may be trafficked for the purposes of adoption, particularly international adoption. Children are sourced from orphanages or kidnapped, or parents may be tricked, cajoled or coerced into relinquishing custody.

Former Georgia State Senator Nancy Schaefer criticized the Adoption and Safe Families Act for incentivizing child protection organizations to be corrupt. She argued that the thousands of dollars in adoption bonuses for every child adopted out rewarded such organizations with seizing children from and thwarting reunification efforts with the children's parents.

=== Medical research ===
It is often difficult to recruit pediatric cases for phase 1 toxicity trials of experimental drugs. Because international adoptees are vulnerable and because medical personnel have authority over legal guardians, facilitation of international adoption to effectively traffic children for enrollment in pharmaceutical clinical trials is a practice by many medical research universities.

Disreputable international adoption agencies then arrange international adoptions, charging high fees to prospective adoptive parents. The Hague Convention on the Protection of Children and Cooperation in regard to Intercountry Adoption is an international agreement designed to protect children from such exploitation and to assist in preventing such illegal intercountry adoptions.

=== Child begging ===
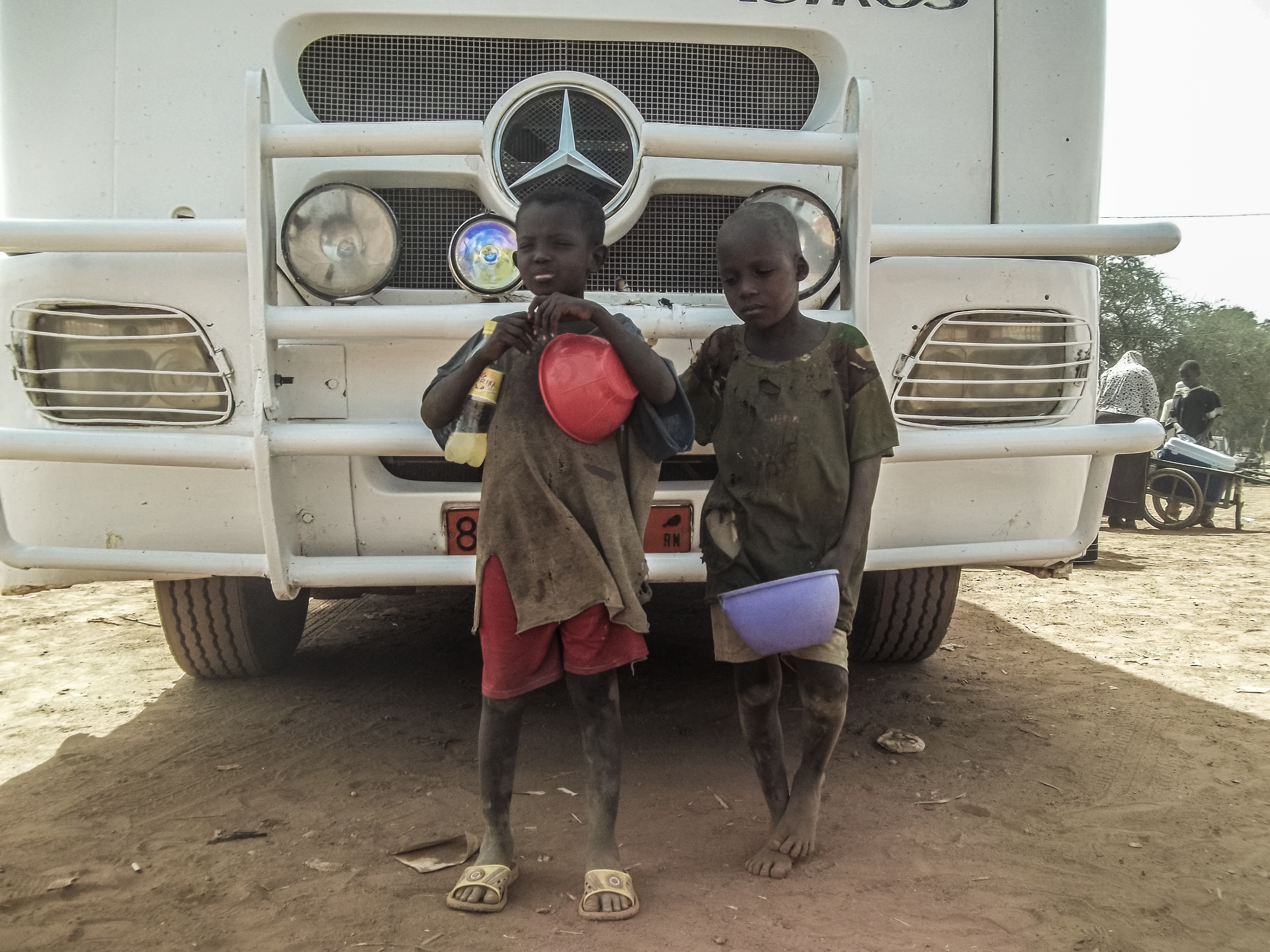
Forced child beggars in Niger

Forced child begging is a type of begging in which boys and girls under the age of eighteen are forced to beg through psychological and physical coercion. Begging is defined by the Buffalo Human Rights Law Review as "the activity of asking for money as charity on the street". There is evidence to suggest that forced begging is one industry that children are trafficked into, with a recent UNICEF study reporting that 13% of trafficking victims in South Eastern Europe have been trafficked for the purpose of forced begging. The UN protocol affirms that "the recruitment, transportation, transfer, harboring or receipt of a child for the purpose of exploitation shall be considered 'trafficking in persons' even if this does not involve any of the means set forth in subparagraph (a) of this article." With this definition the transportation of a child to an urban center for the purposes of begging constitutes trafficking regardless of whether this process was enforced by a third party or family member. The severity of this form of trafficking is starting to gain global recognition, with the International Organization for Migration (IOM), the European Union, the ILO, and the UN, among others, beginning to emphasize its pertinence. The European Union's Brussels Declaration on Preventing and Combating Trafficking includes child begging as one form of trafficking, stating "trafficking in human beings is an abhorrent and worrying phenomenon involving coercive sexual exploitation, labour exploitation in conditions akin to slavery, exploitation in begging and juvenile delinquency as well as domestic servitude." This issue is especially difficult to regulate given that forced begging is often imposed by family members, with parental power leveraged over a child to ensure that begging is carried out.

==== Demographics ====
By definition child begging occurs in persons younger than eighteen, though forced begging has been found by UNICEF to exist among children as young as the age of two. Instances of this practice have been recorded by the World Bank in South and Central Asia, Europe, Latin America, the Caribbean, the Middle East, and West Africa.

Most research, such as studies done by UNICEF, suggests that boys are much more likely than girls to be trafficked for the purposes of begging; experts presume this is because there is a greater female presence in trafficking for the purposes of sexual exploitation. In Albania, where forced begging is a common practice, seventy percent of victims are male.

While concrete figures are difficult to determine, the ILO recently reported that there are at least 600,000 children involved in forced begging. The problem may be much more extensive, however, with China's Ministry of Civil Affairs reporting that as many as 1.5 million children are forced into begging. Additionally, a 2012 study carried out in Senegal by Human Rights Watch projected that a minimum of 50,000 children within the country and neighboring nations had been trafficked for the purposes of begging. Begging is often the primary source of income for street children in a number of countries, with a 2011 study conducted by UNICEF finding that 45.7% of children who work on the streets of Zimbabwe engaged in begging, though there is no way of knowing whether it was through forced means.

Gang networks involving forced begging have been found to occur in populations of 500 or greater.

==== Motivations ====
===== Economic factors =====
Forced begging is a profitable practice in which exploiters are motivated by economic incentives. The business structures of major rings of children trafficked for the purpose of begging have been examined as comparable to a medium-size business enterprise. In the most severe cases networks of children forced to beg may generate $30–40,000 USD for the profiteer. Though family networks are not nearly as extensive, a study conducted in Albania showed that a family with multiple children begging can earn up to fifteen euros a day, an amount greater than the average national teacher salary. Anti-Slavery International asserts that because this income is relatively high many families believe it is the best option available given the lack of existing capabilities. Capability deprivation, meaning the routine absence of adequate resources that serve in facilitating opportunities, may account for cross-generational begging practices within families. UNICEF studies have found that begging is especially prevalent among families in which parents are incapacitated in some way, leading children to be the sole providers.

A necessary component of the fight against child trafficking in Africa is an increase in resources among impoverished communities. Many families have lost the ability to care for their children, so they feel that they must place them in care facilities, which often leads to the trafficking of these children. According to Addo, before the implementation of institutional care facilities in Sub-Saharan Africa, families practiced kinship fostering to care for one another’s children in cases of extreme poverty and orphanhood. Currently, many African countries are undergoing community development to provide resources for the extended family of orphaned children to help care for them (Addo). In his article about human trafficking in Africa, Blessing tells a story of children in the Democratic Republic of the Congo whose impoverished parents sent them to a camp that was advertised as a free place for children to spend their holidays. In reality, there was no camp, and all of these children were sucked into human trafficking. Despite their best efforts, the parents of these children could not locate them for two years due to a lack of resources. Once the children were found, the parents ended up in the midst of a legal battle for their child’s custody (Blessing). Child trafficking in areas of Africa such as the DRC would be drastically reduced with the increase of resources for their parents to make a better life, and escape poverty.

An increase in law enforcement is another important factor in working towards the reduction of orphanage trafficking. “Under international human right law, the obligation to protect the victims of human trafficking derives from a general duty to secure, ensure or restore rights as well as to provide remedies” (Obokata 542). In his book titled The African Court of Justice and Human Peoples’ Rights in Context, Obokata explains how law enforcement should handle situations of trafficking based on commonly accepted human rights. Often governments of developing countries are slow to intervene in cases of human trafficking because the system benefits that country’s economy. According to Van Doore, “The largest predictor of human trafficking is governmental corruption” (Van Doore 79). Governments are responsible for ensuring that minimal standards of residential care are met by residential care facilities which include government licensing, but many choose to be too lenient in regards to these standards, resulting in the unsafe living conditions created by the human trafficking industry that have saturated many orphanages across Sub-Saharan Africa.

The final essential element to eradicate orphanage trafficking is the restriction of voluntourism. As defined by Pippa Biddle, voluntourism is volunteer work done by a foreigner in a developing country for a short period of time with the presumption of positive outcomes (Biddle 46). Voluntourism is generally performed by well-meaning volunteers from rich and predominantly white countries, but it can create highly unstable and unsafe living conditions for orphaned children. The voluntourists live and work in the same space as these young children, but no background checks are required (Biddle 134). The majority of funding for orphanage trafficking comes from voluntourism, missions trips, and private donations, so children are trafficked into orphanages to fill the space and create a perfect volunteer environment to keep the funding coming. The shocking reality is that these children barely see a penny of all the money donated to them. Nigerian orphanages have been connected with baby factories where trafficked women are detained, raped, and forced to carry and deliver a child for the purpose of selling it into these “orphanages”.

===== Political factors =====
According to the World Bank forced begging is most commonly found in the Middle East and countries of West Africa, where laws prohibiting begging are scarce and heavy regulation of trafficking absent. In Zimbabwe, where child begging is especially prominent, the United Nations has indicated many contradictions between the Labour Act of Zimbabwe and the United Nations Convention on the Rights of the Child. Many nations, such as Indonesia, have laws against begging on the books, but the repercussions for such entail temporary detainment and eventual release back onto the streets, which does little to combat the issue.

===== Cultural factors =====
There are several cultural factors that support begging. In Europe begging is found in a number of minority cultures, especially popular within Roma and nomadic communities. In Turkey familial networks of beggars have been documented across three generations, making it deeply ingrained within their survival schemas. It is important to note that while these may be culturally rooted practices, juvenile begging by way of familial pressure still falls under the realm of forced begging. The transport of children, even one's own, for the purposes of exploitation through begging is a form of trafficking outlined by the United Nations.

Another cultural practice is the resolution of familial debts through the kidnapping and exploitation of one of their children.

==== General abuses ====
UNICEF has found that children who are forced to beg by third parties are often removed from their families, surrender the majority of their income to their exploiter, endure unsafe work and living conditions, and are at times maimed to increase profits. The process of maiming, popularized by the film Slumdog Millionaire, is common given that according to the Buffalo Human Rights Law Review children with apparent special needs often make upwards of three times as much as other children who beg. In addition to inflictions such as blindness and loss of limbs, other physical abuses for the purposes of heightening profits include pouring chili pepper on a child's tongue to give the appearance of impeded speech, the use of opium to elicit cries, and administering forced injections of drugs that will increase a child's energy and alertness. Testimonies against trafficking ring gang leaders have discussed the detainment of individuals in small cells devoid of food, water, and light to make victims weak and feeble, and thus more likely to elicit donations.

The conditions in which begging takes place commonly expose children to further physical and verbal abuse, including sexual victimization and police brutality. Research completed by Human Rights Watch revealed that when begging hours are completed for the day children often do not have proper shelter, adequate food, or access to healthcare where they reside. Furthermore, many of the gangs which run networks of forced begging have heavy drug involvement, thus the children under their control are often turned into drug addicts in order for them to become further reliant on their exploiters.

==== Long-term implications ====
Studies have shown that children forced into begging primarily receive little to no education, with upwards of sixteen hours a day dedicated to time on the streets. With education being a leading method in escaping poverty child beggars have been shown to engage in a cyclical process of continuing this practice cross-generationally. Interviews conducted by UNICEF show that children who beg have little hope for the future and do not believe their circumstances will improve. Children who work on the streets typically have little or no knowledge of their rights, leaving them especially susceptible to exploitation both as juveniles and later as adults. Children who beg have also been found by UNICEF to have much higher instances of HIV infection due to lack of awareness and supervision on the streets.

==== Solutions ====
===== International action =====
A victim-centered human rights approach to combating trafficking has been internationally renowned as the best possible strategy when addressing this issue, with recourse focusing on punishing the exploiter and rehabilitating the child. Some countries who emphasize this method include the United States, with the Victims of Trafficking and Violence Protection Act of 2000 affirming "victims of severe forms of trafficking should not be inappropriately incarcerated, fined, or otherwise penalized solely for unlawful acts committed as a direct result of being trafficked."

Other supported methods, such as those outlined by the Buffalo Human Rights Center, include relying on three Ps: protection, prosecution, and prevention. Protection starts with enforcing strict measures on the matters of both trafficking and begging. For many nations the first step is the criminalization of begging and trafficking. Prosecution should be instituted in the form of greater legal ramifications for traffickers, with punishment focused on the exploiter rather than the exploited. This becomes difficult with respect to victims of familial trafficking, considering this would require changes in care placement and strict monitoring of each displaced child's welfare. Many organizations affirm that prevention begins with discouraging donations and improving services so that children, and families as a whole, have greater capabilities. Though well-intentioned, by giving child beggars money, individuals only make this practice more profitable, and soon these funds find their way into the hands of the child's abuser.

===== Government response =====
In Senegal, where the abuses against talibes are extensive, there have been several initiatives with the help of the World Bank to put an end this exploitation. First, there is intervention on a community level with education on the validity of some of these Quranic institutions provided to rural villages that typically send their children there. This is supplemented by improved regulation of schools within the nation to ensure that they remain places of education, followed by a greater enforcement of preexisting laws banning trafficking and exploitative begging. Finally, rehabilitation services have been provided with the help of CSOs to recovered children to provide them with the capabilities they have been denied.

In Zimbabwe policy has adapted to ensure the safety of all persons under the age of sixteen with the Children's Protection and Adoption Act, however, the government admits that a lack of resources and capital play a critical role in inadequate enforcement.

In Bangladesh, where there are an estimated 700,000 beggars, a law passed in 2009 banning the practice, though officials report some trouble with enforcement.

In China, the Ministry of Public Security has established a department that solely focuses on child trafficking. The department has a hotline where the public dials 110 to report suspected instance of forced begging, which law enforcement officials are expected to investigate further. The police are trained to take the children into custody if a blood relationship with their guardian cannot be established, and educate parents on the illegality and dangers of begging if they are those responsible for the child's action. This policy instituted in April 2009 has since led to the recovery of 9,300 children.

===== NGO initiatives =====
Many NGOs have initiated movements focusing on informing the public on the dangers of donations. As UNICEF reported in 2006, "certain behaviors, such as giving money to child beggars can also indirectly motivate traffickers and controller to demand children." The Mirror Foundation's Stop Child Begging Project of Thailand is one such organization that emphasizes eliminating the demand. Their initiatives are focused on educating passersby on the forced begging of trafficked Cambodians within their country to decrease the likelihood of donations.

===== Other methods =====
In China, where the kidnapping and forced begging of children has been routinely documented, a multi-media movement has begun. Here, blogs are utilized to publicize over 3,000 photos of children whose families believe have been abducted for the purpose of begging, with hundreds of thousands of followers who remain on the look out for these children in major urban centers. This campaign has enabled at least six children to be recovered and reunited with their families.

In instances where begging is religiously sanctioned it has been suggested by the United States Agency for International Development (USAID) that religious leaders should outwardly condemn this practice. For talibes religious leaders have been asked to take a stance against begging using passages cited from the Quran, such as, "Except paradise, you should not beg anything for the sake of Allah" (8:23), which would help strip the practice of its religious foundation. In addition, former US President Clinton took the responsibility of providing protection against child abuse through Internet Service Providers (ISP) that can help law enforcement track any suspicious activities including child pornography.

=== Sales motivated by cash ===
In ancient Rome, according to Keith Bradley, Augustine wrote that "there were indigent parents selling their children because they needed the cash."

In contemporary Nepal, parents of poor families sell their children to orphanages (or sometimes simply hand them over without any payment). The orphanage then misrepresent them as "orphans", ensuring an income for the orphanages.

== Mechanisms ==
In general, child trafficking takes place in three stages: recruitment, movement, and exploitation. Recruitment occurs when a child is approached by a recruiter, or in some cases, directly approaches a recruiter themselves. Recruitment is initiated in many different ways: adolescents may be under pressure to contribute to their families, children may be kidnapped or abducted into trafficking, or families may be trafficked together. Then, movement will occur—locally, regionally, and/or internationally—through a variety of transportation types, including by car, train, boat, or foot. Ultimately, the final goal of child trafficking is exploitation, whereby traffickers use the services of children to garner illegal profit. Exploitation can take place in a variety of forms, including forced labour, sexual exploitation, and child begging, among other practices.

=== Supply and demand framework ===
Child trafficking is often conceptualized using the economic model of supply and demand. Specifically, those who are trafficked constitute the "supply", while the traffickers, and all those who profit from the exploitation, provide the "demand". Two types of demand are defined: consumer demand and derived demand. Consumer demand is generated by people who actively or passively buy the products or services of trafficked labour. An example of this would be a tourist purchasing a T-shirt that has been made by a trafficked child. Derived demand, on the other hand, is generated by people who directly profit from the practice of trafficking, such as pimps or corrupt factory owners. Scholar Kevin Bales has extensively studied the application of this economic framework to instances of human trafficking; he contends that it is central to an accurate understanding of how trafficking is initiated and sustained. Bales, along with scholars Elizabeth M. Wheaton, Edward J. Schauer, and Thomas V. Galli, have asserted that national governments should more actively implement policies that reduce both types of demand, thus working towards the elimination of trafficking.

=== Social mechanisms ===
Various international organizations, including the ILO and UN.GIFT, have linked child trafficking to poverty, reporting that living in poverty has been found to increase children's vulnerability to trafficking. However, poverty is only one of many social "risk factors" that can lead to trafficking. As UNICEF and the World Bank note, "Often children experience several risk factors at the same time, and one of them may act as a trigger that sets the trafficking event in motion. This is sometimes called 'poverty plus,' a situation in which poverty does not by itself lead to a person being trafficked, but where a 'plus' factor such as illness combines with poverty to increase vulnerability." UNICEF, UN.GIFT, and several scholars, including Una Murray and Mike Dottridge, also contend that an accurate understanding of child trafficking must incorporate an analysis of gender inequality. Specifically, in many countries, girls are at a higher risk of being trafficked, particularly into sexual exploitation. In addition, these international agencies and scholars contend that giving women and men an equal voice in anti-trafficking policy is critical to reducing the incidence of child trafficking.

Studies throughout Europe have identified risks that make children vulnerable to exploitation that are also causes and contributing factors of child trafficking. These include social and economic marginalisation, dysfunctional family backgrounds, experiences of neglect, abuse or violence within the family or in institutions, exploitative relationships, gender-based violence and discrimination, experiences of living or working on the streets, precarious and irregular migration situations, aspirations to work and to earn money and limited opportunities to enter or remain in school, vocational training or regular employment. As the efforts of national governments to improve social safety nets can lessen many of these risks, child trafficking is considered not only a result of criminal activities but also as indicating weaknesses in the national government's ability to effectively safeguard children's rights to a safe and healthy development.

== Identification ==
The complex definition of child trafficking and the differences in national laws and interpretations makes the identification of child victims of trafficking challenging. For example, the European debate on child trafficking lacks consensus on how child trafficking is to be distinguished from other contexts of exploitation, from social dumping of migrants, the sale of children and the smuggling of migrants. People smugglers are also known to exploit children to transport migrants across international borders.

Once a potential victim has come into contact with state authorities, identifying the child as a victim of trafficking takes time. The process often benefits from a thorough understanding of the child's story. For a child who is in trouble with the law, hearing the child's full story helps caseworkers and officers determine if the child is actually a victim of a crime herself, such as exploitation, abuse, or trafficking. For a child in an administrative process, such as an asylum procedure, hearing the child's full story helps caseworkers to detect cases of trafficking. Children may be hesitant to share their complete stories with authorities and appointed child welfare professionals. Some service providers have found that establishing trust and a stable relationship with the child encourages increased disclosure of experiences of exploitation and trafficking that might otherwise not be detected. The trust building process can include granting assistance and support services to ensure safety, well-being and development.

Identified victims of child trafficking are entitled to special safeguards that all child victims of crimes are entitled to under international law. These safeguards include the right to guardianship, legal assistance and representation, safety and protection, support for physical and psychological recovery and social reintegration, regularisation of immigration status, the right to compensation, and the right to act as a party, or plaintiff, in criminal proceedings. An important safeguard for trafficked children who have been exploited in illegal or criminal activities is the ‘non-punishment clause’. It means that child victims of criminal offences, including human trafficking, are to be protected from sanctions or prosecution for acts that they committed in relation to their situation as victims.

Articles 19 and 32-36 of the UN Convention on the Rights of the Child prohibits the exploitation of children in any form and in any context. Any child who is exposed to violence, exploitation or abuse can be considered a victim of crime and enjoys the correlated rights and entitlements, including access to assistance, protection and support, services for recovery and rehabilitation, access to justice, with due procedural safeguards in any related legal or administrative proceedings. Children at risk of exploitation have to be identified and recognised as being at risk. This implies that they have a right to assistance and support in order to prevent their exploitation or any other harm resulting from the risks. Considering the difficulties of identifying children who have been trafficked and the broad protection against all forms and contexts of exploitation afforded under the Convention, a child rights-based approach prioritises the identification of child victims of exploitation or other crime and children at risk. Whether or not exploitation takes place in a context of trafficking is of subordinate relevance for the child rights and protection context. It may interest primarily the law enforcement investigations and the prosecution.

== Prevalence ==
It is difficult to obtain reliable estimates concerning the number of children trafficked each year, primarily due to the covert and criminal nature of this practice. It often takes years to gather and compile estimates regarding child trafficking and, as a result, data can seem both inadequate and outdated. This process of gathering data is only complicated by the fact that very few countries publish national estimates of child trafficking. As a result, the available statistics are widely thought to underestimate the actual scope of the problem.

Perpetrator

In the United States of America, from 2010-2015 approximately 1,400 individuals were arrested for the specific charge of sex trafficking of a minor. The average age of the perpetrator's are 28.5 years old, and 45.1% of victims knew their trafficker prior to being trafficked. Federal prosecution has increased significantly, 17% from 2019-2020 and children made up 69% of the victims in charged sex trafficking cases in 2020.

=== Worldwide ===
Trafficking of children has been documented in every region of the world. A widely used figure regarding the prevalence of this practice in 2012 was that 1.2 million children were trafficked each year, while current figures estimates the number is closer to 3 million in 2024. There has been a 25% increase in detection reported.

=== Regional ===
Regionally, The 2024 UNODC Global Report on Trafficking in Persons provides estimates for child trafficking by region per year:

Central America and the Caribbean, Sub-Saharan Africa and North Africa recorded the highest share of children out of total detected victims (around 60%), followed by East Asia and the Pacific and South Asia. Child trafficking is the most prevalent in developing countries, though it does occur in developed and industrialized economies as well. Notably, the US Department of State publishes an annual "Trafficking in Persons" report which provides data regarding the prevalence of human and child trafficking in the majority of countries. As many as 300,000 American youth may be at risk of commercial sexual exploitation at any time.

=== History (England) ===
According to anthropologist Samuel Pyeatt Menefee, in late 17th and 18th century Britain, parents in poverty "sold their children (actually, their children's services, but to all intents and purposes their persons as well)". Sale motivations were more economic than for wife sales and prices, drawing from limited data, "appear to have been fairly high". Many of the boys sold were climbing boys for chimney sweeps until they were no longer small enough. Prostitution was another reason for selling a child, usually a girl. One sale was of a niece; another was the sale by a man of the daughter of a woman domestic partner who also ran his business. Some children were stolen and then sold.

== Causes ==
Scholarly research has indicated that there is no root cause for child trafficking. There are, however, multiple reasons which contribute to high numbers such as poverty, humanitarian crisis and lack of education. Migration can also be voluntary.

=== Poverty ===
Poverty is the leading cause for child trafficking worldwide.

Often parents are not able to provide for their families and consequentially exploit their children for financial reasons. These influencers lead to children being more inclined to take riskier jobs in order to sustain life for themselves and their families. The decision for parents to expose their children for child trafficking, due to poverty, is not always for money incentives, but also because a lack of education causes them to believe that migration elsewhere will provide their children with more opportunities, which will help them escape chronic poverty. Sometimes children are orphaned as a result of poverty, leaving them in the hands of child traffickers. There are estimated to be around 120 million children living on the streets in the world (30 million in Africa, 30 million in Asia, and 60 million in South America), making children vulnerable and thus easy targets.

=== Humanitarian crisis ===
Child trafficking is 20-30% higher after natural disasters. This was seen after the 2015 earthquake and 2010 earthquake in Haiti. The increase of sex trafficking after natural disasters results in the victimization of girls under the age of 18, specifically 33%. of girls under the age of 18 in such areas. The reason is increased vulnerability and financial instability which arises after natural disasters hit.

=== Lack of education ===
A lack of education and literacy furthermore makes families more vulnerable to traffickers. Parents are often unaware of the negative consequences of child trafficking and voluntarily send their children away. Additionally, children are often not aware of their rights and lack understanding regarding which of their rights are violated. There is a need to educate children of their rights, because it will reduce the likelihood of manipulation and forced industry work. Informing children of their right to education will increase the net enrollment and grade completion rate.

=== Voluntary migration ===
In 2013 youth migrants, ages 15–24 made up 12% of total migration. The term "child trafficking" is often misused when migration is voluntary. "Youth migration" refers to youth choosing to leave homes to access opportunities elsewhere. Opportunities such as quality education, employment, and adventure are often scarce in rural areas, which is why migration often occurs from rural to urban areas. The ILO stated that 27 million young people leave their countries of birth to seek employment abroad as international migrants. In order to make migration safer for youth the UN adopted "Addressing migration opportunities and challenges is central to achieving sustainable economic and social development" to their new development goals, which are to be released in 2030.

== Impacts ==
=== Children and families ===
According to UN.GIFT, child trafficking has the most significant impact on trafficked children and their families. First, trafficking can result in the death or permanent injury of the trafficked child. This can stem from a dangerous "movement" stage of trafficking or from specific aspects of the "exploitation" stage, such as hazardous working conditions. Moreover, trafficked children are often denied access to healthcare, effectively increasing their chances of serious injury and death. Trafficked children are also often subject to domestic violence; they may be beaten or starved in order to ensure obedience. In addition, these children frequently encounter substance abuse; they may be given drugs as "payment" or to ensure that they become addicted and thus dependent on their trafficker(s). As opposed to many other forms of crime, the trauma experienced by children who are trafficked is often prolonged and repeated, leading to severe psychological impacts. UN.GIFT reports that trafficked children often suffer from depression, anxiety, and post-traumatic stress disorder, among other conditions.

Effects on families are also severe. Some families believe that sending or allowing their children to relocate in order to find work will bring in additional income, while in reality many families will never see their trafficked children again. In addition, UN.GIFT has found that certain forms of trafficking, particularly sexual exploitation in girls, bring "shame" to families. Thus, in certain cases, children who are able to escape trafficking may return to their families only to find that they are rejected and ostracized.

=== Communities ===
Child trafficking has also been shown to have a major effect on communities. If multiple children in a community are trafficked, it can result in the entire community being corrupted, and thus devastated, by trafficking. Social development efforts are hindered, as trafficked children's educations are cut short. As a result of this lack of education, children who escape trafficking may be less able to secure employment later in life. In addition, trafficked girls face special obstacles, in that their prospects for marriage might be diminished if the community becomes aware that they have been trafficked, particularly into sexual exploitation.

=== Nations ===
On a national level, economic development is severely hindered by the lack of education of trafficked children; this results in a major loss of potentially productive future workers. Children who are able to successfully return to their families often pose a significant financial burden, due to their lack of education, and the illnesses and injuries they may have incurred during trafficking work. There are major costs associated with the rehabilitation of these trafficked children, so that they are able to successfully participate in their communities. Furthermore, the persistence of child trafficking indicates the presence of sustained criminal activity and criminal networks, which, in most cases, are also associated with drugs and violence. As a result, UN.GIFT has cited child trafficking as a significant indicator of national and global security threats.

== Proposed solutions ==
Solutions to child trafficking, or "anti-trafficking actions", can be roughly classified into four categories:

- Broad protection: "To prevent children and former victims from being (re)trafficked"
- Prevention: "Of the crime of child trafficking and the exploitation that is its end result"
- Law enforcement: "In particular within a labour context and relating to labour laws and regulations"
- Protection: "All steps towards the redress of their grievance, rehabilitation and helping to establish her/him."

Broad protection actions are geared towards children who could potentially be trafficked, and include raising awareness about child trafficking, particularly in vulnerable communities. This type of outreach also includes policies geared towards improving the economic statuses of vulnerable families, so that reasonable alternatives are available to them, other than sending their children to work. Examples of this include increasing employment opportunities for adults and conditional cash transfer programs. Another major broad protection program that has been readily endorsed by UN.GIFT, the ILO, and UNICEF involves facilitating gender equality, specifically by enhancing both boys' and girls' access to affordable, quality education. Other forms of protection and resources are conveniently located clinics, clean water, sustainable environments, and financial literacy.

Preventative actions are more focused on addressing the actual practice of child trafficking, specifically by implementing legal frameworks that are aimed to both deter and prosecute traffickers. This involves the adoption and implementation of the ILO's international labour standards, as well as the development of safe and legal migration practices.

Law enforcement refers to the actual prosecution of traffickers; UNICEF maintains that successful prosecution of child traffickers is the surest way to send a message that child trafficking will not be tolerated. Traffickers can be "caught" at any one of the three steps of trafficking: recruitment, movement, and/or exploitation; anti-trafficking laws as well as child labour laws must then be appropriately enforced and having them properly implemented. The development of grassroots surveillance systems has also been suggested by UNICEF which would enable communities to immediately report signs of child trafficking to legal authorities. However, some anti-trafficking groups, such as the Young Women's Empowerment Project, are against working with law enforcement due to cases where law enforcement officials played roles in the exploitation of the victim. In June 2016, 14 Oakland Police officers were alleged to have been involved in a sex scandal involving a teenaged prostitute, including some while she was allegedly a minor.

Protection begins first with victim identification; child trafficking laws must specifically and appropriately define what constitutes a "trafficking victim". Legal processes must then be in place for removing children from trafficking situations, and returning them either to their families or other appropriate settings. Victims should also be provided with individualized and supportive physical and psychological rehabilitation in order to establish themselves. Trauma-informed programs, prevention education programs, survivor-led centers, and other recovery and community integration programs are options as well. Youth-specific vulnerabilities such as homelessness, lack of family, mistrust, lack of socialization, coercive relationships, substance abuse, and lack of education can cause challenges for in the process of rehabilitation for some children. Some scholars advocate for rights-based development, where the victims, survivors, and youth at-risk should be able to participate in the planning of projects and have continued involvement in order to build autonomy and leadership. This recuperation can take quite a length of time but, with the individual having the correct support, they can work towards a functional life.

Finally, steps should be taken to avoid "double victimization"—in other words, to ensure that formerly trafficked children are treated as victims, and not as criminals. An example of "double victimization" would be a child who was illegally trafficked into sexual exploitation in the United States, and then, once free from trafficking, is prosecuted for being an illegal migrant. The End Trafficking Project is the initiative to raise awareness about child trafficking and help people take action to protect children. The UNICEF has come up with ways to help children from child exploitation and the risk factors that need to be addressed. These include:

- Helping parents provide a living wage, so the children will not have to support the family
- Lobbying governments and others to develop laws and strengthen child protection systems to prevent violence and abuse
- Supporting the training of professionals working with children, and police and border officials to help stop trafficking.
- Working with communities and organizations to change societal norms that make children more vulnerable to exploitation

=== Relevant organizations ===
Many organizations have proposed potential solutions to child trafficking. These organizations continue to conduct research concerning this practice and policies that can be implemented to work towards its eradication. The most internationally recognized of these organizations include:

- United Nations
- UNICEF
- Office of the United Nations High Commissioner for Human Rights
- United Nations Global Initiative to Fight Human Trafficking
- International Labour Organization
- United States Department of State
- ECPAT International
- International Justice Mission
- Child Recovery Agency

== See also ==
- Adoption fraud
- Bon Secours Mother and Baby Home
- Child-selling
- Child grooming
- Child trafficking in India
- Children in emergencies and conflicts
- Chu Li-ching infant trafficking case
- Debt bondage
- Exploitation of labour
- Forced prostitution
- Human trafficking in Georgia (country)
- International child abduction
- List of international instruments relevant to the worst forms of child labour
- Refugee children

== Works cited ==
- Beyrer, Chris (2004). "Global Child Trafficking". The Lancet. 364: S16–17. doi:10.1016/s0140-6736(04)17624-1. PMID 15967136. S2CID 43451141.
- Bradley, Keith (1994). Slavery and Society at Rome. Cambridge: Cambridge University Press. ISBN 0-521-37887-7.
- Gozdziak, Elzbieta; MacDonnell, Margaret (2007). "Closing the Gaps: The Need to Improve Identification and Services to Child Victims of Trafficking". Human Organization. 66 (2): 171–184. doi:10.17730/humo.66.2.y767h78360721702 (inactive 17 January 2026). S2CID 145578026.
- Kendall, Virginia; Funk, T. (2012). Child Exploitation and Trafficking: Examining the Global Challenges and U.S. Responses. Plymouth, UK: Rowman & Littlefield. ISBN 978-1442264793.
- Menefee, Samuel Pyeatt (1981). Wives for Sale: An Ethnographic Study of British Popular Divorce. New York: St. Martin's Press. ISBN 9780312886295.
- Meredith, Robyn (2007). The Elephant and the Dragon: The Rise of India and China and What It Means For All of Us (1st ed.). New York: W.W. Norton. ISBN 978-0-393-06236-6.
- Vinkovic, Mario (2010). "The 'Unbroken Marriage' - Trafficking and Child Labour in Europe". Journal of Money Laundering Control. 13 (2): 87–102. doi:10.1108/13685201011034032.
- Child Trafficking in the Nordic Countries, Rethinking strategies and national responses, A Technical Report (Report). UNICEF Innocenti Research Centre. 2012.
