= Human trafficking in Georgia =

Human trafficking in Georgia may refer to:

- Human trafficking in Georgia (country)
- Human trafficking in Georgia (U.S. state)
