= Commercial sexual exploitation of children =

Form of child sexual abuse

Commercial Sexual Exploitation of Children (CSEC) defines the "umbrella" of crimes and activities that involve inflicting sexual abuse on to a child as a financial or personal opportunity. Commercial Sexual Exploitation consists of forcing a child into prostitution, sex trafficking, early marriage, child sex tourism and any other venture of exploiting children into sexual activities. According to the Office of Juvenile Justice and Delinquency Prevention, the lack of reporting the crime and "the difficulties associated with identifying and measuring victims and perpetrators" has made it almost impossible to create a national estimate of the prevalence of Commercial Sexual Exploitation of Children in the United States. There is an estimated one million children that are exploited for commercial sex globally; of the one million children that are exploited, the majority are girls.

== CSEC in the United States ==
According to the Office of the Assistant Secretary for Planning and Evaluation, "Between 244,000 and 325,000 American youth are considered at risk for sexual exploitation, and an estimated 199,000 incidents of sexual exploitation of minors occur each year in the United States." Within the United States, schools are one of the biggest targets of children becoming trafficked.

Due to the COVID-19 pandemic in 2021, the most recent year for which national data is available, "the actual number of children abused is likely underreported".

== Terminology ==
The Declaration and Agenda for Action, adopted during the First World Congress against Commercial Sexual Exploitation of Children, held in Stockholm, Sweden, in 1996, formally defines CSEC as:

a fundamental violation of children's rights. It comprises sexual abuse by the adult and remuneration in cash or kind to the child or a third person or persons. The child is treated as a sexual object and as a commercial object. The commercial sexual exploitation of children constitutes a form of coercion and violence against children, and amounts to forced labour and a contemporary form of slavery.

CSEC is often associated with child trafficking, which is defined as "the recruitment, transportation, transfer, harbouring or receipt of a child for the purpose of exploitation", and a child as any person under the age of 18. However, not all trafficked children are trafficked for the purposes of CSEC. Furthermore, the sexual abuse of child trafficking victims at work may not necessarily constitute CSEC. Likewise, CSEC is also part of, but distinct from other forms of child abuse and child sexual abuse, including child rape and domestic violence.

In 2016, the exploration of child sexual abuse (CSA) effects in Eastern Trinidad was conducted, as it was suggested that children may be at risk of experiencing sexual abuse. Child trafficking is a form of modern-day slavery that is rapidly growing in the United States. A mutating and multifaceted system of severe human exploitation, violent crimes against children followed by child abuse, and violations of their rights. Child slavery and human trafficking are global public health concerns with profound risks to life-course trauma and health. Globally, over 50% of child trafficking victims are recruited by family and friends, and children account for 27% of all human trafficking victims happening worldwide, with two out of every three child victims being girls.

== Types ==
=== Prostitution ===
There is an estimated 1–2 million minors that are exploited sexually through prostitution every year. Most children in the U.S. become a part of the prostitution industry around the ages 12–14 years old. These children are typically "trafficked by someone they know, such as a friend, family member, or romantic partner", though the trafficker is sometimes a pimp or a gang.

=== Child sex tourism ===
Child sex tourism (CST) involves predators that travel from their homeland to a different country to engage in sexual relations with a trafficked child The prevalence of travel and tourism has increased the accessibility for traffickers to have access to trafficked children from other countries. Traffickers often travel to underdeveloped countries to take advantage of the lack of laws surrounding the crime of child prostitution, corruption within government, high levels of poverty, and other various factors.

=== Pornography ===
Child pornography is the "representation of a child engaged in explicit sexual activities or any representation of the sexual parts of a child for primarily sexual purposes" whether in real life or simulated. When it comes to the representations of child pornography they include and come in many forms being photographs, audiotapes, and especially videos that portray children performing sexual acts with objects, adults even other children. The children are subjected to exploitation, rape, pedophilia, and in extreme cases, murder.

Pornography is often used as a gateway into the sex trade industry. Many pimps force children into pornography as a way of conditioning them to believe that what they are doing is acceptable. Pimps may then use the pornography to blackmail the child and extort money from clients.

The production, possession and distribution of child pornography are prohibited by law and are harshly punished. Child pornography generally involves egregious acts of criminal sexual abuse and exploitation towards children, which are profoundly harmful to the child victims, being a form of child abuse. Those who seek to or are currently participating in the exploitation of children are currently connecting on Internet networks in order to sell, share, and trade material.

Fig.1 Child Pornography Points of Production
	International	National	Regional	Local
Production format	State-of-art technology in audiovisual equipment, development, and mass reproduction process.	Essentially the same as international.	Private developing studios and labs; lower quality material.	Lowest quality of all the markets; relies on retail level technology (instant cameras. Photostats). Direct purchase or exchange, mail.
Distribution methods	Mail, courier, direct sale.	Adult bookstores, mail (commercial and Postal Service), direct sale.	Mail (commercial, U.S.), direct purchase or exchange, adult bookstores.	Direct purchase or exchange, mail.
Producers	Syndicated sex rings, entrepreneurs, and freelance photographers.	Organized crime and freelance pornographers.	Primarily freelance pornographers, with some work hired out on contractual basis by local pimps or pedophiles.	Community or neighborhood pedophiles, sex rings, and pimps.
Evasion techniques	Mobile production and development sites, false identities, multiple disguised mailings of merchandise.	Use of middleman to arrange routine purchases, parental release form, and mobile production and developmental sites.	Transient identities and locations of pornographers, rapid turnover in children used as models, and parental release forms.	Victims coerced or blackmailed into silence; offender's mobility and good reputation often insulate from any suspicion.
Status	Still available, with emphasis on use of Third World youths as models; periodic inroads into traffic by foreign police and U.S. federal law enforcement agencies; reactive nature of police investigations precludes permanent abolition of production and distribution.	Extremely resilient, despite harsh federal laws occasional disruption of the flow of merchandise. Resold in neighboring countries and exported to Asia, Europe, and Africa.	Extremely difficult to intercept on proactive basis. Pimps and pornographers use juvenile hustlers and molested children as subjects. May later emerge in foreign publications. Parental consent binds guilty parties to secrecy; increasing emphasis on suggestive materials.	Pornography made at the local level is the mainstay of the pedophilic subculture; typically discovered during police search or accidentally via postal investigations.

=== Live streaming sexual abuse ===
The emergence of these online communities has also boosted and promoted communication between local offenders, both bonding over and normalizing their interest in children, desensitizing them to the physical and psychological damages sometimes anonymously that way they can share without fear of being caught. The advancement of technology has led sex traffickers to "adopt and adapt new online capabilities to target and exploit victims and create 'market' opportunities". Technology is available in almost every aspect of the world, giving sex traffickers easier access entirely.

The growth of the Internet has allowed sex traffickers to make a bigger profit from their illegal activities. For example, cybersex traffickers have the power to share a victim with other sex buyers, opening up a bigger pool of dangerous individuals. Virtual platforms create a more cost-effective approach for sex traffickers, as they don't have to physically transport victims or obtain a physical location.

== Causes ==
It is difficult to pinpoint specific causes of commercial sexual exploitation of children because of the underlying issues weaved in to sexual exploitation as a whole such as, the secrecy and hidden acts that occur within this organized crime. Due to the complexity of commercial sexual exploitation governments and organizations have little understanding as to what the causes are; however, there are factors that can influence the prevalence of commercial sexual exploitation of children. Some of those factors are the following:

=== Poverty ===
"Over 35% of the world's population lives on less than $2.00 a day" with around 2.5 billion humans being at risk for human trafficking. The parents are promised by traffickers that their children will become educated or be properly nourished, or even a possible money trade between groomer and parents. Some parents trade their child for money as a way to pay off debt. Due to the lack of education, many of these parents living in poverty are unaware of the dangers surrounding commercial exploitation of children and view it as a chance for a better life for their child.

=== Lack of education ===
Schools provide protection and stability for children while learning life skills and increasing their confidence in the world and themselves. When this is not available children become more vulnerable to being trafficked. With the lack of funding of schools within lower-income areas it is difficult to get students engaged with school leading to dropouts. With the lack of education and financial stability, children become lured into commercial sexual exploitation.

=== Corrupt law enforcement ===
A study conducted on the correlation between corruption in law enforcement and within the government is strongly related to commercial sexual exploitation specifically, human trafficking. However, it is nearly impossible for research to be conducted in this area due to significant challenges that are faced such as the lack of information available on corruption within societies.

=== Gender-specific and cultural aspects ===
Many cultures and governments have biased views on the value of a man versus a woman. There are many societies for example, Chinese and Cambodian cultures that believe "that having sex with virgins rejuvenates a man". Unfortunately, due to this belief, the market for underage girls in the prostitution or trafficking is greatly demanded. Children that belong to cultural minorities are often discriminated as well; leading to a significant disproportionate number of children belonging to minorities becoming victims of commercial sexual exploitation.

== Dangers and consequences ==
Whether the children be in pornography, brothels, or trafficked, they are all at risk for sexually transmitted infections, physical violence, and psychological deterioration. Research has shown that "fifty to ninety percent of children in brothels in Southeast Asia are infected with HIV". In many cases, when children are brought into the sex trade industry, they are beaten and raped until they are so broken they no longer try to escape. Physical hazards can also include infertility, cervical cancer, assault, and sometimes murder. Pregnancy is also a physical risk factor for many children. Much like if they are found to have HIV or AIDS, the girls are thrown out of the brothels with nowhere to go. Many of the children "break the conscious link between mind and body" in order to function in these situations (Bales 221). By doing so, many children begin to think they are nothing more than "whores" and some develop suicidal thoughts. Other psychological risk factors include sleep and eating disorders, hysteria, and even homicidal rage.

Outside physical and psychological dangers lies fear of the law. Many girls and women are illegally trafficked across borders. If they manage to escape from the brothel or pimp, the women and children quickly come to the attention of the authorities. Because they do not have proper documentation they are detained by the authorities. If they are held in local jails, the women and children often suffer further abuse and exploitation by the police.

Child exploitation involves various forms of harm, as children are classified as a vulnerable population within social structures. Abuse extends beyond physical violence such as bodily injury to include sexual abuse, emotional abuse, and neglect.

The effects of children used in child pornography can have psychological, emotional, and physical effects on a survivor. These are inescapable repercussions which can include general symptoms of flashbacks, as well as post-traumatic stress disorder that could lead a child to sink into a deep depression. Sexual abuse can lead to other results of self-harm, substance abuse, eating disorders, pregnancy, sleep disorders, suicide, and multiple other sexually transmitted infections (STIs). Experiencing sexual abuse is not something any child should endure or would choose for themselves at all, yet due to their young nature and innocence they are forced to cope with unavoidable situations and symptoms from the trauma they have endured.

== Prevalence ==
While it is impossible to know the true extent of the problem, given its illegal nature, the International Labour Organization (ILO) global child labour figures "...worldwide that there are 246 million exploited children aged between 5 and 17 involved in debt bondage, forced recruitment for armed conflict, prostitution, pornography, the illegal drug trade, the illegal arms trade and other illicit activities around the world".

The Rapid Assessment survey, developed by the ILO's International Programme for the Elimination of Child Labour (IPEC) and United Nations Children's Fund (UNICEF), relies on interviews and other, mainly qualitative, techniques, to provide a picture of a specific activity in a limited geographic area.

UNICEF and the United Nations Population Fund (UNFPA) estimate that 2 million children are exploited in prostitution or pornography every year.

== International Fight Against Commercial Sexual Exploitation of Children ==
The first world meeting to fight globally against the commercial sexual exploitation of children was held in Stockholm, Sweden in 1996. The idea was first proposed by End Child Prostitution in Asian Tourism (ECPAT) in 1994. ECPAT then worked collaboratively with the United Nations International Children's Emergency Fund (UNICEF) and other nongovernmental organizations to create the world Congress that fights to bring awareness to the problem of commercial sexual exploitation of children.

There has been multiple agreements and works of actions put in place to fight against the commercial sexual exploitation of children. One of the actions being taken is the United Nations Convention against Transnational Organized Crime which was "adopted by General Assembly resolution 55/25 of 15 November 2000". This convention is meant to target three areas of organized crime one of those areas being "the protocol to prevent, suppress and punish trafficking in persons, especially women and children". The purpose is to encourage participants to cooperate in the actions needed to prevent and transactional crimes.

"The World Congress III against Sexual Exploitation of Children and Adolescents took place in Rio de Janeiro, Brazil" on November 25 through 28th in 2008. The Congress was composed of UNICEF, ECPAT, the NGO Group for the Convention on the Rights of the Child, and lastly, the Brazilian Government. This Congress' turnout for advocating and speaking out against the sexual exploitation of children was incredible. There was over 3,000 attendees coming from over 135 government, institutions, and civil communities. 300 of these participants were adolescents.

== Prevention ==
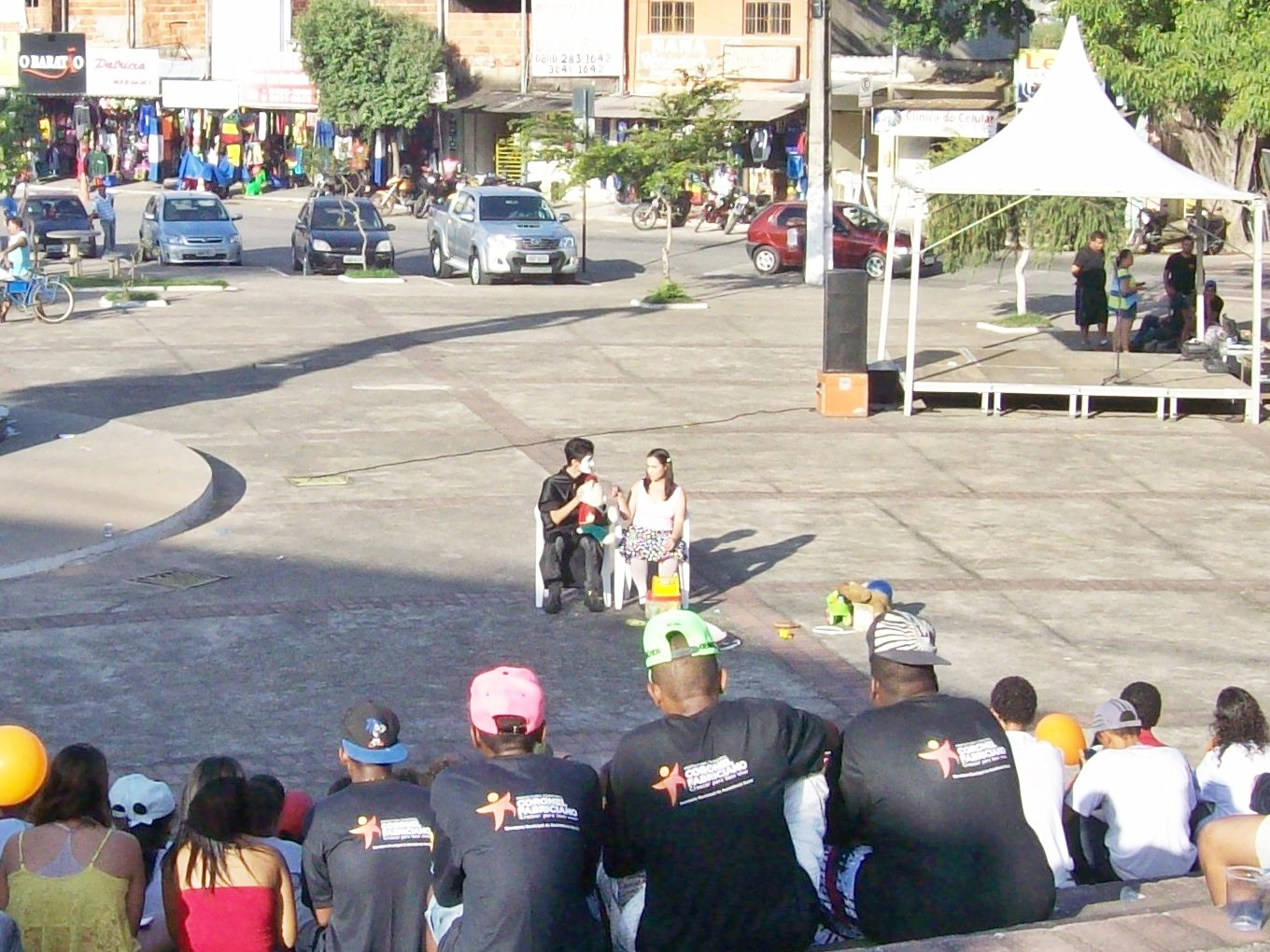
Theater about sexual violence against children in Coronel Fabriciano, Brazil

=== Education ===
One of the many ways to aid in CSEC prevention is through education. The previously mentioned Protocol requires members to provide preventative measures against child sexual exploitation; among these preventative measures is educating the public, especially families, on the dangers of sex tourism and trafficking. Other efforts involve educating police, medical, and school personnel on how to identify CSEC victims and respond in a situation involving CSEC, and educating potential CSEC victims about the tactics recruiters often use to reach at-risk individuals.

Several organizations make a conscious effort to contribute to CSEC prevention. We Are Pact, for example, has three educational initiatives where they actively advocate different individuals to contribute to prevention. These initiatives include the Y-ACT Program, the CSAM Prevention Program, and the PACT Training Institute. The Y-ACT Program contains a series of workshops that aim to discuss child trafficking, healthy relationships, healthy virtual identities, and community as a resource. Y-ACT offers both standalone and series workshops, tailored to the needs of participants in terms of length, curriculum, and age ranges, with a focus on creating a student-centered environment that promotes safety, empowerment, and inclusivity. The CSAM Prevention Program offers a safe environment for parents to learn about identifying trafficking and exploitation warning signs, covering topics such as online safety, managing discussions with youth, and utilizing community resources, with programs available in both English and Spanish at no cost. The PACT Training Institute provides training for professionals working with children on human trafficking, covering red flags and steps to take when concerns arise, aiming to equip staff with confidence in addressing complex issues, ultimately fostering environments where children feel safe to seek help.

Another effort taking great stride in CSEC prevention is the Interdiction for the Protection of Children program, which employs proactive policing tactics aimed at preventing criminal offenses, with a focus on rescuing child victims of sexual abuse and exploitation, as well as those at risk of victimization. Additionally, it conducts investigations to identify offenders and individuals posing a high risk to children, while also gathering intelligence on offender methodologies to inform law enforcement intervention efforts.

==== What Parents Can Contribute ====
Prevention starts with early instillment throughout childhood. Children need to be knowledgeable of their bodily autonomy, which parents can instill from an early age. "Body autonomy begins with simple things you can teach your child, starting in their toddler years and reaffirming the lessons as they grow."

There are many ways to start these methods and reaffirm them as a child grows. For example, parents can teach their children the different body parts, emphasizing that it is normal and healthy to talk about this openly. Also, parents can teach them the importance of saying "no" whenever they are in an uncomfortable situation. Last but not least, it is key for parents to emphasize that secrets "should always be shared with a trusted adult".

==== Safety Measures ====
Prevention can drastically improve with safety measures, such as the following:

1. Thoroughly get to know the adults present in children's lives. "Any adult that seems more interested in children than anyone does should raise a cautionary flag in one's mind."
2. Know where someone's children are and who they are with. "Make it a family rule that if your children's plans change, they must notify you before they do something or go somewhere you don't know about."
3. Ensure any social media accounts that children have are private.
4. Teach one's own children, when the appropriate age arrives, about the National Sexual Assault Hotline, as well as the National Child Abuse Hotline, 800.4.A.CHILD (422-4453). Educate them on the importance of knowing these resources.

==== Privacy ====
The best form of preventing commercial sexual exploitation of children is privacy. Preventing unknown adults from being around a child can prevent potential groomers from being around a child. INHOPE claims, "Many groomers perceive the presence of parents as an increased risk of being detected." In today's time, many groomers approach children online due to the feeling of protection. Creating privacy settings on children's technology can protect from potential traffickers coming in to contact with minors. Monitoring children's online friendships and knowing the signs of a risky friendship can prevent the exposure of sexual exploitation. Being clear with children about the harms that can be inflicted due to the invasion of privacy is critical. Many children are often confused by the current privacy education provided to them due to the lack of "specific privacy rules or actions".

== See also ==
- Child sexual abuse
- Demons of Eden
- Pedophilia
- International Programme on the Elimination of Child Labour
- Trafficking in human beings
- Trafficking of children

Groups, organizations and programmes against child sexual abuse and child labour

- ECPAT
- FBI
- Cybertip.ca
- Immigration and Customs Enforcement (ICE)
- International Programme on the Elimination of Child Labour
- Mongolian Gender Equality Center
- United States Postal Inspection Service
- OneChild
- Towards the Elimination of the worst forms of Child Labour

Relevant ILO conventions and recommendations

- Worst Forms of Child Labour Convention
- Worst Forms of Child Labour Recommendation
