= Child labour law =

Child labour laws are statutes placing restrictions and regulations on the work of minors.

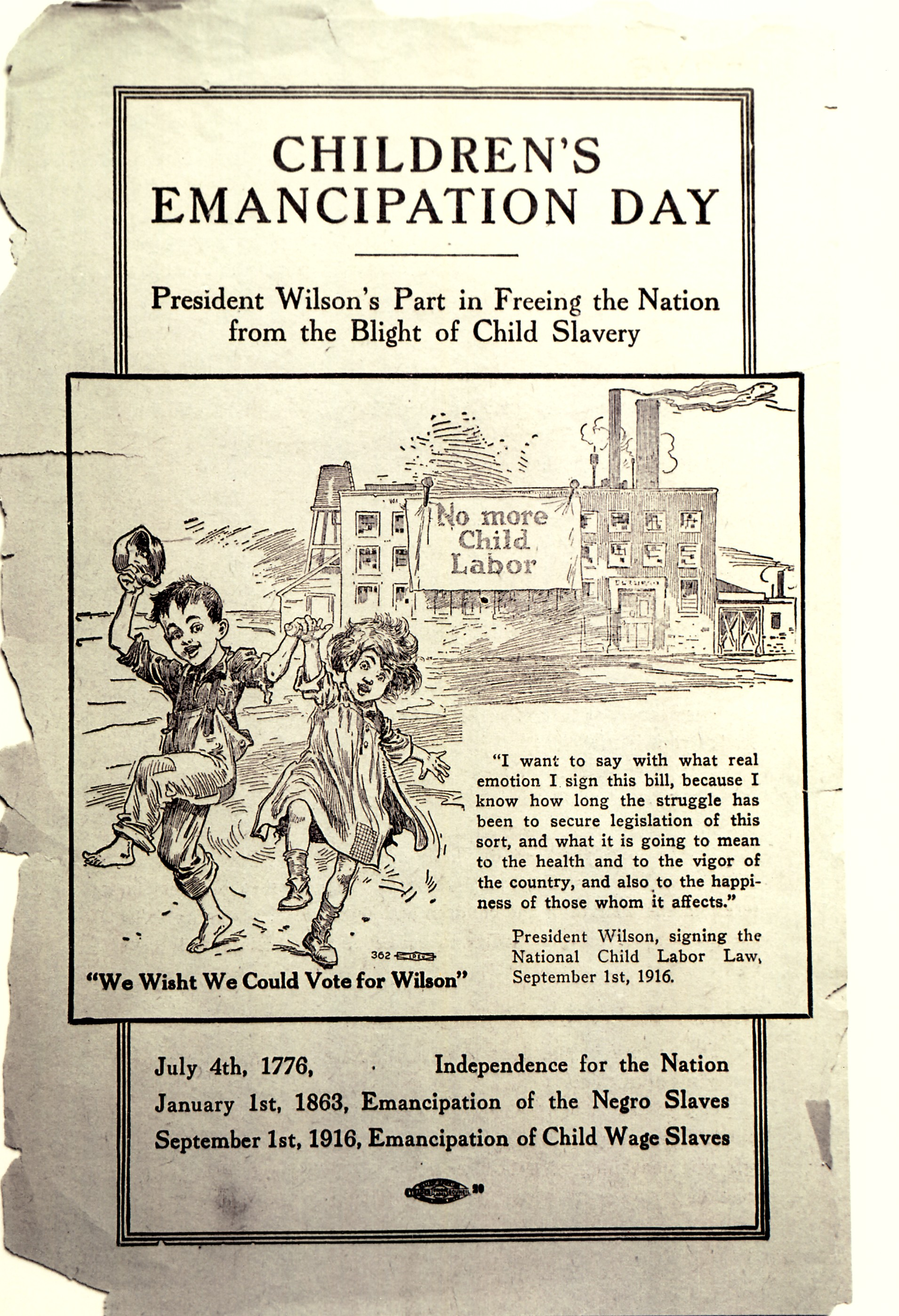
Political cartoon celebrating the newly signed National Child Labor Law in 1916.

Child labour increased during the Industrial Revolution due to the children's abilities to access smaller spaces and the ability to pay children less wages. In 1839 Prussia was the first country to pass laws restricting child labor in factories and setting the number of hours a child could work, although a child labour law was passed was in 1836 in the state of Massachusetts. Almost the entirety of Europe had child labour laws in place by 1890.

The International Labour Organization (ILO) works to set global minimum standards of labour. The United Nations declared 2021 as the International Year for the Elimination of Child Labour.

== History ==
Child labour has existed since the start of civilized society. Early history showed children were used to pick berries and do small maintenance in nomadic tribes. Once people started setting areas, children were used to help on the farmlands. This is a practice that continues even to today. Child labour expanded during the Industrial Revolution. Children were able to work in smaller places that adults could not access, such as chimney sweeps, behind cotton machines, and in small places in mining. This work was dangerous and children often lost their lives while working.

[Next Paragraph opening statement may be incorrect. Uk passed the 1833 Factory Act ]

In 1839 Prussia was the first country to pass laws restricting child labor in factories and setting the number of hours a child could work. Though the reasons behind why these laws were passed were to expand working conditions for adults, it did lead to laws being passed across Europe. In 1839 Britain enacted its Factory Act which restricted child labour and in 1841 France adopted its first child labour laws. Almost the entirety of Europe had child labor laws in place by 1890. Although individual states had adopted laws starting with Massachusetts in 1844, the United States did not enact federal laws until the Fair Labor Standards Act was passed in 1938. This law set minimum wages to 40 cents per hour (equivalent to $9.15 in 2025), restricted the child work week to 40 hours a week, and restricted children under 16 from working in manufacturing plants and mining. In 1941 the U.S. Supreme Court mandated that the law was constitutional.

Much of the labour laws enacted started either shortly before or after World War I. The International Labour Organization (ILO) and UNICEF were created with the Treaty of Versailles after the end of World War I as a way to bring safer working conditions for adults, institute minimum age labour limits, enhance working conditions for children, and eliminate child labour around the globe. In 1919 members of the ILO consisted of countries from the League of Nations. In total 41 countries brought together the ILO. In 1926, the United States joined the ILO. After World War II, the ILO was adopted, and then funded, by the United Nations. After World War II, the ILO set out to change the child labour standards not just with the countries in the United Nations, but also expanded around the globe. In 1992 the ILO created the International Programme on the Elimination of Child Labour (IPEC) which is an organization that works exclusively on the elimination of child labour and exploitation.

A global North–South divide is a divide indicative of economic and political standings. Prior to the year 1990, most child labour laws were enacted in what has been termed the Global North. With the creation of many agencies, the promotion of child labour laws has expanded into what is termed the Global South. In 2014 there were many changes and laws passed in several Asian and Pacific Island countries. Thailand, the Philippines, Kazakhstan, Indonesia, Papua New Guinea, the Solomon Islands, Bangladesh, Timor-Leste, Sri Lanka, Nepal, the Maldives, India, Kiribati, Mongolia, Pakistan, Afghanistan, Fiji, and Cambodia have seen laws passed limited the age of children laborers, increases in schools, and harsher punishments for those caught sexually exploiting children.

By 2014, there were an increase in child labour laws in many Sub-Saharan African countries. Ethiopia, Ghana, Guinea-Bissau, Angola, Botswana, Burundi, Comoros, Madagascar, Seychelles, Zimbabwe, Chad, Cameroon, Cabo Verde, Lesotho, South Africa, Djibouti, Guinea, and Sierra Leone have produced plans to increase child education, set age limits on child labor, and enacted laws to eliminate child trafficking and sexual exploitation. Côte d'Ivoire, Ghana, Kenya, Mozambique, Niger, São Tomé and Príncipe, Tanzania, and Uganda have conducted individual research on child labor and child trafficking but have not enacted any laws.

== Current global laws ==
Since its induction, the International Labour Organization currently has 23 conventions, or laws, within its constitution that regulate the labor of adults and children. These laws include the minimum age restriction, protection against forced labor, holiday/vacation time granted, conditions of the workforce, safety standards, protections for pregnant women, and night time working conditions. Within these conditions are stricter standards set for the safety of children. Most of the conventions and recommendations for child labour fall under Article 3, The Elimination of child labour and the protection of children and young persons.

The first convention listed is the Minimum Age Convention, 1973. This convention states that a person under 18 cannot work in a facility that may jeopardize their safety, health, or morals. This work includes mining, operation of heavy machinery, and heavy manual labor. Minors ages 13–15 May perform light work as long as the work does not bring any harm or hinder their education. Children under 13 are restricted from working. The Worst Forms of Child Labor conventions mandates that persons under 18 cannot be used in work as slaves, prostitution, pornography, or drug trafficking. The Medical Examination conventions hold that anyone under 18 cannot work in an industrialized or non-industrialized position without being deemed fit by medical professional. Person's under the age of 18 are not permitted to work underground such as in a mine. Persons aged 18–21 are required to be supervised when working in an underground environment. Lastly, persons over the age of 14 but younger than 18 must have at least 12 hours off, 14 if currently engaged in school, and these hours must include the hours of 10 pm through 6 am. These conventions and recommendations are in place to provide children with a safe working environment and promote their education. Since its start in 1919, 186 countries have become members of ILO. As a member of the ILO, countries vow to keep the minimum conventions held in the ILO constitution.

== Changes taking place ==
Since the start of these organizations, there has been a decrease in the number of child laborers. Between 2008 and 2012 there was a reduction of 78 million child laborers. This was nearly one third of child laborers since 2008, with the highest number of reduction in Asian countries. Even with the reduction, there is an estimated 168 million children ages 5–17 still in the labor force. Sub-Saharan Africa has the highest number of child laborers. Sub-Saharan Africa are enslaving child workers and exploiting their labour in the production of cocoa and mining. The ILO and IPEC are concentrating their efforts in Sub-African to reduce and eliminate child labour in the regions.

One way to ensure that products bought were not produced by child labour or through unsafe labour practices is by purchasing items through the World Fair Trade Organization, WTFO. The WTFO set 10 core principles which includes that any products registered could not have been produced by forced child labour and if any child labour was provided it remained within the conventions of the ILO.

== Global organizations promoting change ==
The International Labour Organization, or ILO, is the leading organization advocating against child labour. The ILO mission is to promote the rights of workers, encourage decent employment opportunities, enhance social protection and increase awareness of work-related issues. Founded in 1919 after World War One. Since its inception, the ILO has promoted safe working environments. In 1973, the ILO drafted its first conventions. Since then it has had several modifications. Currently, the ILO contains 186 nations that have vowed to maintain the minimum labour requirements in these conventions. The ILO continues to push for global labour laws and restrictions on child labour.

The International Programme on the Elimination of Child Labour (IPEC) is an organization established in 1992 by the International Labour Organization. Where the ILO is centered on reform in all forms of labour, both adult and child, the IPEC primarily focuses on the elimination of all forms of child labour. The IPEC uses programs to remove children from working environments and places the children in an educational setting. The IPEC provides job training for the parents to enhance their economic position to reduce the reliance of income from the child. The IPEC currently has operations in 88 countries and is the largest operation in the world working to reduce child labour, it makes sure conditions are met and children are safe.

UNICEF, or the United Nation Children's Fund, was founded in 1919 after World War I. UNICEF promotes the safety and well-being of children and actively works to change harsh conditions that children live in. UNICEF promotes education for all children. UNICEF also works against to reduce and eliminate child labour and the exploitation of children. Currently UNICEF has programs in 190 countries and programs.

The International Initiative to End Child Labor (IIECL) is a not-for-profit organization based out of the United States that actively works around the world to end child labor. The IIECL uses education and training programs to enable children and adults to gain an education and promote adult based labor skills. The organization also monitors and evaluates public and private sector, non-government organizations, organizational research, and development institutions to eliminate child labor.

The Child Labor Coalition was founded in 1989. The Child Labor Coalition uses its Stop Child Labor campaign to promote the education and well-being of working minors as well as actively work to eliminate the exploitation of children.
