= Child prostitution =

Form of child sexual exploitation

Child prostitution is prostitution involving a child, and it is a form of commercial sexual exploitation of children. The term normally refers to prostitution of a minor, or person under the legal age of consent. In most jurisdictions, child prostitution is illegal as part of a general prohibition on prostitution and child sexual abuse.

Child prostitution usually manifests in the form of sex trafficking, in which a child is kidnapped or tricked into becoming involved in the sex trade, or survival sex, in which the child engages in sexual activities to procure basic essentials such as food and shelter. Prostitution of children is commonly associated with child pornography, and they often overlap. Some people travel to foreign countries to engage in child sex tourism. Research suggests that there may be as many as 10 million children involved in prostitution worldwide. The practice is most widespread in South America and Asia, but prostitution of children exists globally, in undeveloped countries as well as developed. Most of the children involved with prostitution are girls, despite an increase in the number of young boys in the trade.

All member countries of the United Nations have committed to prohibiting child prostitution, either under the Convention on the Rights of the Child or the Optional Protocol on the Sale of Children, Child Prostitution and Child Pornography. Various campaigns and organizations have been created to try to stop the practice.

== Definitions ==
Several definitions have been proposed for prostitution of children. The United Nations defines it as "the act of engaging or offering the services of a child to perform sexual acts for money or other consideration with that person or any other person". The Convention on the Rights of the Child's Optional Protocol on the Sale of Children, Child Prostitution, and Child Pornography defines the practice as "the act of obtaining, procuring or offering the services of a child or inducing a child to perform sexual acts for any form of compensation or reward". Both emphasize that the child is a victim of exploitation, even if apparent consent is given. The Worst Forms of Child Labour Convention, 1999, (Convention No 182) of the International Labour Organization (ILO), describes it as the "use, procuring or offering of a child for prostitution".

According to the International Labour Office in Geneva, prostitution of children and child pornography are two primary forms of child sexual exploitation, which often overlap. The former is sometimes used to describe the wider concept of commercial sexual exploitation of children (CSEC). It excludes other identifiable manifestations of CSEC, such as commercial sexual exploitation through child marriage, domestic child labor, and the trafficking of children for sexual purposes.

The terminology applied to the practice is a subject of dispute. The United States Department of Justice states, "The term itself implies the idea of choice, when in fact that is not the case." Groups that oppose the practice believe that the terms child prostitution and child prostitute carry problematic connotations because children are generally not expected to be able to make informed decisions about prostitution. As an alternative, they use the terms prostituted children and the commercial sexual exploitation of children. Other groups use the term child sex worker to imply that the children are not always "passive victims".

== Causes and types ==
Children are often forced by social structures and individual agents into situations in which adults take advantage of their vulnerability and sexually exploit and abuse them by selling them or selling their bodies. Structure and agency commonly combine to force a child into commercial sex: for example, the prostitution of a child frequently follows from prior sexual abuse, often in the child's home. Many believe that the majority of prostituted children are from Southeast Asia and the majority of their clients are Western sex tourists, but sociologist Louise Brown argues that, while Westerners contribute to the growth of the industry, most of the children's customers are Asian locals.

Prostitution of children usually occurs in environments such as brothels, bars and clubs, homes, or particular streets and areas (usually in socially run down places). According to one study, only about 10% of prostituted children have a pimp and over 45% entered the business through friends. Maureen Jaffe and Sonia Rosen from the International Child Labor Study Office write that cases vary widely:

Some victims are runaways from home or State institutions, others are sold by their parents or forced or tricked into prostitution, and others are street children. Some are amateurs and others professionals. Although one tends to think first and foremost of young girls in the trade, there is an increase in the number of young boys involved in prostitution. The most disquieting cases are those children who are forced into the trade and then incarcerated. These children run the possible further risk of torture and subsequent death.

Deputy Attorney General James Cole, of the United States Department of Justice, stated,

Most of the victimized children who face prostitution are vulnerable children who are exploited. Many predators target runaways, sexual assault victims, and children who have been harshly neglected by their biological parents. Not only have they faced traumatic violence that affects their physical being, but become intertwined into the violent life of prostitution.

=== Human trafficking ===
Human trafficking is defined by the United Nations Office on Drugs and Crime (UNODC) as "the recruitment, transport, transfer, harbouring or receipt of a person by such means as threat or use of force or other forms of coercion, of abduction, of fraud or deception for the purpose of exploitation". The UNODC approximates the number of victims worldwide to be around 2.5 million. UNICEF reports that since 1982 about 30 million children have been trafficked. Trafficking for sexual slavery accounts for 79% of cases, with the majority of victims being female, of which an estimated 20% are children. Women are also often perpetrators as well.

In 2007, the UN founded United Nations Global Initiative to Fight Human Trafficking (UN.GIFT). In cooperation with UNICEF, the Organization for Security and Cooperation in Europe (OSCE), and the United Nations Development Fund for Women (UNIFEM) the United Nations took a grant from the United Arab Emirates to establish UN.GIFT. UN.GIFT aims to fight human trafficking through a mutual support from its stakeholders which includes governments, businesses, and other large global actors. Their first initiative is to spread the word that human trafficking is immoral and has become a growing problem and that it will take a global cooperation to cease its continuation. UN.GIFT strives to lower the demand for this exploitation and create a safe environment for potential victims.

In some cases, victims of sex trafficking are kidnapped by strangers, either by force or by being tricked into becoming involved through lies and false promises. They may also be lured through the internet, as child victims of cybersex trafficking are transported and then coerced to perform sexual acts and or raped in front of a webcam on commercialized live streams. In these incidents, consumers use cryptocurrencies and other digital technologies to hide their identities. In other cases, the children's families allow or force them to enter the industry as a result of severe poverty. In cases where they are taken out of the country, traffickers prey on the fact that the children are often unable to understand the language of their new location and are unaware of their legal rights.

Research indicates that traffickers have a preference for females age 12 and under because young children are more easily molded into the role assigned to them and because they are assumed to be virgins, which is valuable to consumers. The girls are then made to appear older, and documents are forged as protection against law enforcement. Victims tend to share similar backgrounds, often coming from communities with high crime rates and lack of access to education. However, victimology is not limited to this, and males and females coming from various backgrounds have become involved in sex trafficking.

Psychotherapist Mary De Chesnay identifies five stages in the process of sex trafficking: vulnerability, recruitment, transportation, exploitation, and liberation. The final stage, De Chesnay writes, is rarely completed. Murder and accidental death rates are high, as are suicides, and very few trafficking victims are rescued or escape.

=== Survival sex ===
The other primary form of prostitution of children is survival sex. The US Department of Justice states:

"Survival sex" occurs when a child engages in sex acts in order to obtain money, food, shelter, clothing, or other items needed in order to survive. In these situations, the transaction typically only involves the child and the customer; children engaged in survival sex are usually not controlled or directed by pimps, madams, or other traffickers. Any individual who pays for sex with a child, whether the child is controlled by a pimp or is engaged in survival sex, can be prosecuted.

A study commissioned by UNICEF and Save the Children and headed by sociologist Annjanette Rosga conducted research on prostitution of children in post-war Bosnia and Herzegovina. Rosga reported that poverty was a strong contributing factor. She stated,

The global sex trade is as much a product of everyday people struggling to survive in dire economic straits as it is an organized crime problem. Attacking the crime and not the poverty is treating the symptom but not the disease...It's not uncommon for girls to know what they're entering into, and to enter voluntarily to some degree. Maybe they think they'll be different and able to escape, or maybe they'd rather take the risk than feel powerless staying at home in poverty.

Jaffe and Rosen disagree and argue that poverty alone does not often force children into prostitution, as it does not exist in a large scale in several impoverished societies. Rather, a number of external influences, such as poor family situations and domestic violence, factor into the problem.

Prostitution of children in the form of survival sex occurs in both undeveloped and developed countries. In Asia, underage girls sometimes work in brothels to support their families. In Sri Lanka, parents will more often have their sons prostitute themselves rather than their daughters, as the society places more weight on sexual purity among females than males. Jaffe and Rosen write that prostitution of children in North America often results from "economic considerations, domestic violence and abuse, family disintegration and drug addiction". In Canada, a young man was convicted of charges relating to the prostitution of a 15-year-old girl online in 2012; he had encouraged her to prostitute herself as a means of making money, kept all of her earnings, and threatened her with violence if she did not continue.

In the United States, where many prostituted children are homeless and runaways, the view of adolescent prostitution as primarily driven by pimp-exploiters and other "sex traffickers" was challenged by SNRG-NYC in their 2008 New York City study which interviewed over 300 under-age prostitutes and found that only 10% reported having pimps. A 2012 study done in Atlantic City, New Jersey, by the same group incorporated an extended qualitative ethnographic component that looked specifically at the relationship between pimps and adolescents engaged with street based sex markets. This study found the percentage of adolescents who had pimps to be only 14% and that those relationships were typically far more complex, mutual, and companionate than has been reported by social service providers, not-for-profits, and much of the news media. On the other hand, youths' status as being a runaway, homeless, or in the foster care system greatly increases their likelihood of being involved in commercial sex, according to the National Runaway Switchboard and the New York State Office of Children, with one-third of runaway youths in America being lured into prostitution within 48 hours on the streets.

== Consequences ==
=== Treatment of prostituted children ===
Prostituted children are often forced to work in hazardous environments without proper hygiene. They face threats of violence and are sometimes raped and beaten. Researchers Robin E. Clark, Judith Freeman Clark, and Christine A. Adamec write that they "suffer a great deal of abuse, unhappiness, and poor health" in general. For example, Derrick Jensen, an environmental activist known for his critiques of modern civilization, reports that female sex trafficking victims from Nepal are "'broken in' through a process of rapes and beatings, and then rented out up to thirty-five times per night for one to two dollars per man". Another example involved mostly Nepalese boys who were lured to India and sold to brothels in Mumbai, Hyderabad, New Delhi, Lucknow, and Gorakhpur. One victim left Nepal at the age of 14 and was sold into slavery, locked up, beaten, starved, and forcibly circumcised. He reported that he was held in a brothel with 40 to 50 other boys, many of whom were castrated, before escaping and returning to Nepal.

Criminologist Ronald Flowers writes that prostitution of children and child pornography are closely linked; up to one in three prostituted children have been involved in pornography, often through films or literature. Runaway teenagers, he states, are frequently used for "porn flicks" and photographs. In addition to pornography, Flowers writes that, "Children caught up in this dual world of sexual exploitation are often victims of sexual assaults, sexual perversions, sexually transmitted diseases, and inescapable memories of sexual misuse and bodies that have been compromised, brutalized, and left forever tarnished."

=== Physical and psychological effects ===
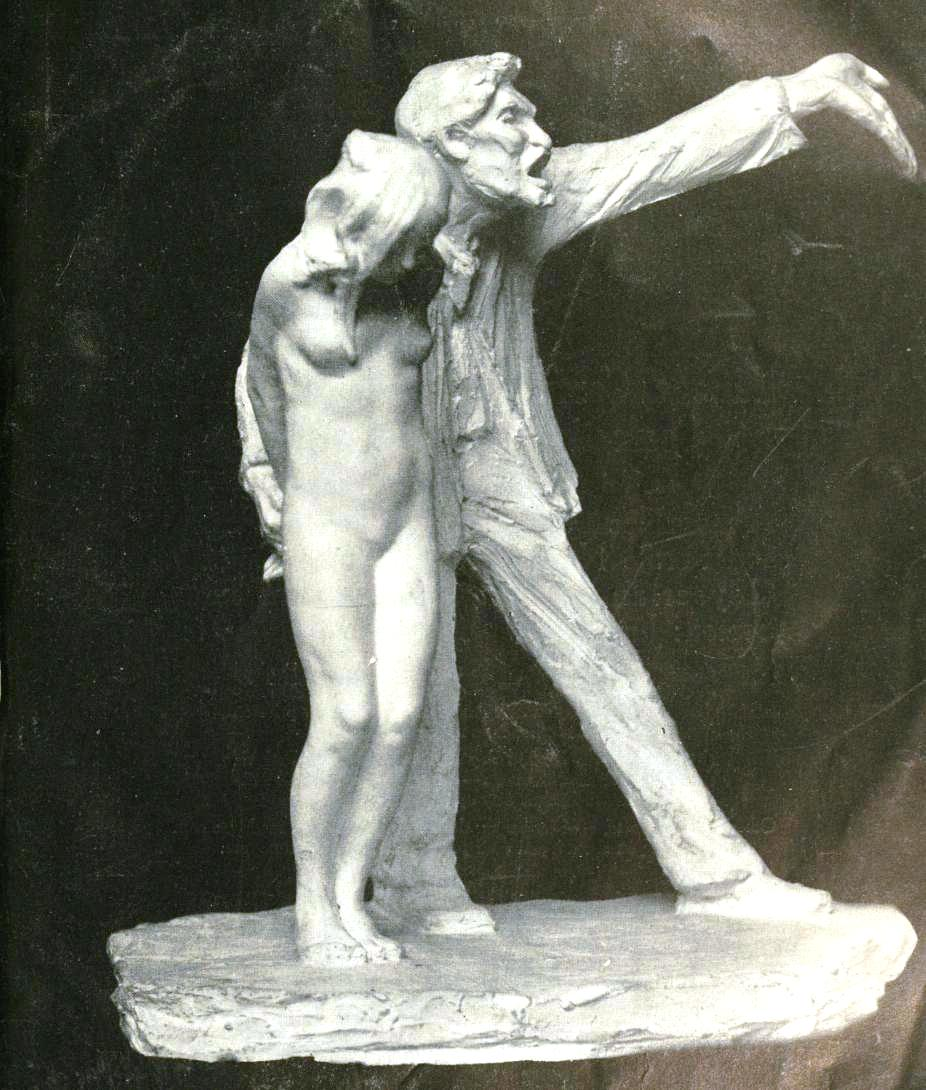
Statue of a young 19th-century prostituted child The White Slave by Abastenia St. Leger Eberle (1878–1942)

According to Humanium, an NGO that opposes the prostitution of children, the practice causes injuries such as "vaginal tearing, physical after-effects of torture, pain, infection, or unwanted pregnancy". As clients seldom take precautions against the spread of HIV, prostituted children face a high risk of contracting the disease, and the majority of them in certain locations contract it. Other sexually transmitted diseases pose a threat as well, such as syphilis and herpes. High levels of tuberculosis have also been found among prostituted children. These illnesses are often fatal.

Children are often medicated to make them appear more mature. Corticosteroids like Oradexon (a glucocorticoid) are commonly provided to prostituted children in places such as Bangladesh, to help make them look and feel more robust (i.e. less frail) and healthier, which in turn helps to keep them going. When use of these drugs is not monitored through bloodwork by a healthcare professional they can cause diabetes and high blood pressure, can weaken the immune system leaving patients more susceptible to illnesses, and can be highly psychologically addictive. In India, some girls are injected with oxytocin to make their breasts grow faster.

Former prostituted children often deal with psychological trauma, including depression and posttraumatic stress disorder (PTSD). Other psychological effects include anger, insomnia, sexual and personality confusion, inability to trust adults, and loss of confidence. Drug-related health problems included dental problems, hepatitis B and C, and serious liver and kidney problems. Other medical complications included reproductive problems and injuries from sexual assaults; physical and neurological problems from violent physical attacks; and other general health issues including respiratory problems and joint pains.

== Prohibition ==
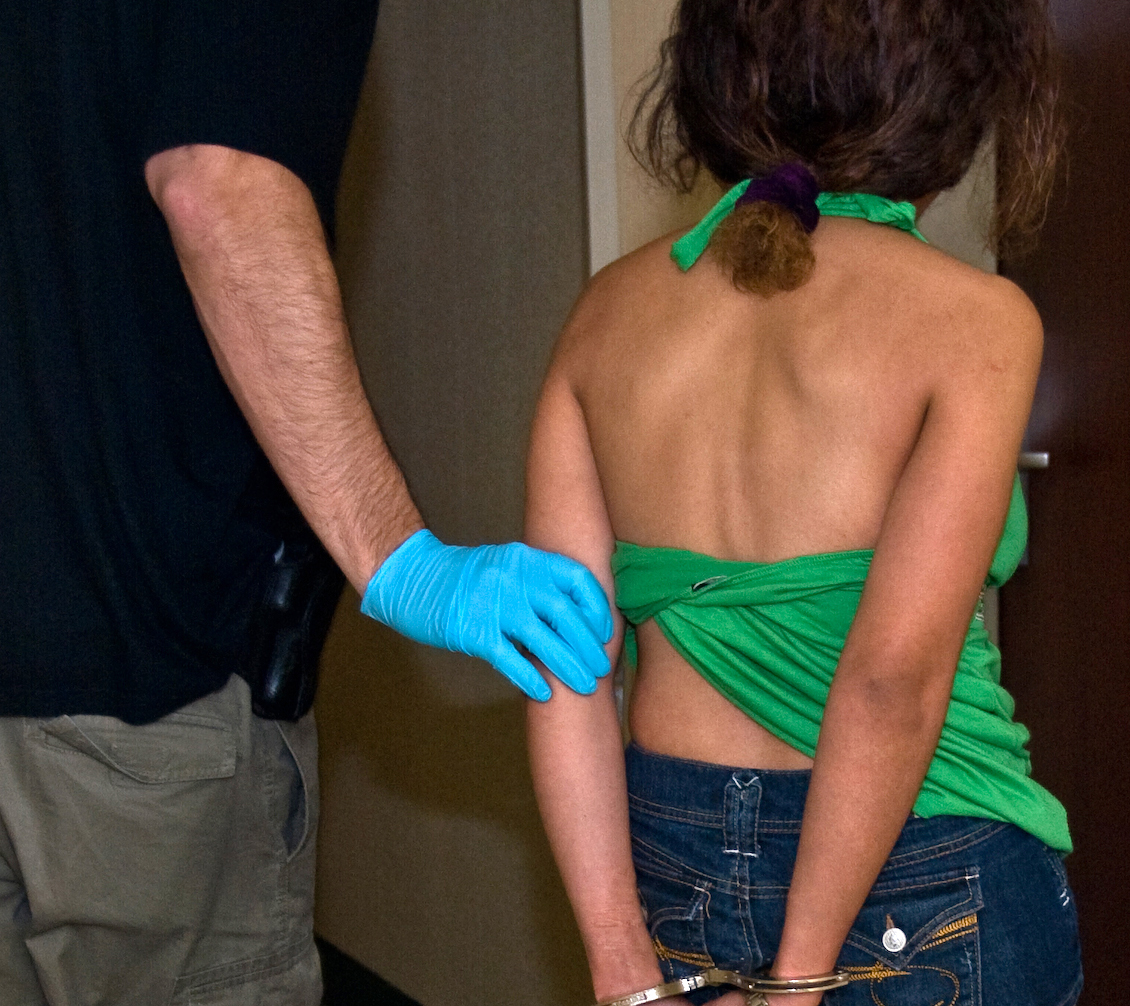
An FBI agent leading away an adult suspect arrested in the Operation Cross Country II, when 105 children were rescued from forced prostitution in October 2008

Prostitution of children is illegal under international law, and the United Nations Convention on the Rights of the Child, Article 34, states, "the State shall protect children from sexual exploitation and abuse, including prostitution and involvement in pornography." The convention was first held in 1989 and has been ratified by 193 countries. In 1990, the United Nations appointed a Special Rapporteur on the sale of children, child prostitution, and child pornography. Over at least the last decade, the international community has increasingly acknowledged the importance of addressing problems posed by the trafficking of children, child prostitution, and child pornography; activities that undermine the rights of children and are frequently linked to organized crime. While the legality of adult prostitution varies between different parts of the world, the prostitution of minors is illegal in most countries, and all countries have some form of restrictions against it.

There is a dispute surrounding what constitutes a prostituted child. International law defines a child as any individual below the age of 18, but a number of countries legally recognize lower ages of consent and adulthood, usually ranging from 13 to 17 years of age. In the Czech Republic, for example, prostitution is legal for children older than 14. Thus, law enforcement officers are sometimes hesitant to investigate cases because of the differences in age of consent; however, the laws of some countries distinguish between prostituted teenagers and prostituted children. For example, the Japanese government defines the category as referring to minors between 13 and 18, although it is defined as being under the age of 18.

Consequences for offenders vary from country to country. In the People's Republic of China, all forms of prostitution are illegal, but having sexual contact with anyone under the age of 14, regardless of consent, will result in a more serious punishment than raping an adult. By contrast, Argentina's Criminal Code criminalizes the prostitution of minors, but only sanctions those who "promote or facilitate" prostitution, not the client who exploits the minor. In the United States, the legal penalty for participating in the prostitution of children includes five to twenty years in prison. The FBI established "Innocence Lost", a new department working to free children from prostitution, in response to the strong public reaction across the country to the news of Operation Stormy Nights, in which 23 minors were released from forced prostitution.

== Prevalence ==
=== Statistical summary ===
Prostitution of children exists in every country, though the problem is most severe in South America and Asia. The number of prostituted children is rising in other parts of the world, including North America, Africa, and Europe. Exact statistics are difficult to obtain, and in some cases, such as that of Argentina, child prostitution is considered to be on the rise but without reliable statistics. However, it is estimated that there are around 10 million children involved in prostitution worldwide.

Note: this is a list of examples; it does not cover every country where child prostitution exists.

Country/location	Number of children involved in prostitution	Notes	Ref(s).
Worldwide	Up to 10,000,000		
Australia	4,000		
Bangladesh	10,000–29,000	In Bangladesh, child prostitutes are known to take the drug Oradexon, an over-the-counter steroid, to make child prostitutes look larger and older. Charities say that 90% of prostitutes in the country's legalized brothels use the drug. See also: Prostitution in Bangladesh	
Brazil	250,000–500,000	Brazil has a high level of child sex trafficking within South America	
Cambodia	30,000		
Chile	3,700	The number of children involved in prostitution is believed to be on the decline.	
Colombia	35,000	Between 5,000 and 10,000 are on the streets of Bogotá.	
Dominican Republic	30,000		
Ecuador	5,200		
Estonia	1,200		
Greece	2,900	Over 200 are believed to be below the age of 12.	
Hungary	500		
India	1,000,000–1,200,000	In 1998, it was estimated that 60% of prostitutes in India were underage. Reuters estimates that thousands of Indian children enter prostitution through trafficking each year. See also: Prostitution in India	
Indonesia	40,000–70,000	UNICEF states that 30% of the females in prostitution are below 18.	
Malaysia	43,000–142,000		
Mexico	16,000–20,000	Out of Mexico City's 13,000 street children, 95% have already had at least one sexual encounter with an adult (many of them through prostitution). In 2005, Lydia Cacho, a Mexican journalist, exposed several Mexican politicians and businessmen in the book The Demons of Eden for having a large role in a child sex slavery and prostitution ring. Main article: Child prostitution in Mexico	
Nepal	200,000	An estimated 12,000–15,000 Nepalese children are trafficked for sexual commercial exploitation each year, mainly to brothels in India and other countries.	
New Zealand	210		
Peru	500,000		
Philippines	60,000–100,000	UNICEF estimates that there are 200 brothels in Angeles City, many of which offer minors for sex.	
Sri Lanka	40,000	UNICEF states that 30% of the females in prostitution are below 18, with children often being trafficked through friends and relatives. The prevalence of boys in prostitution is strongly related to foreign tourism.	
Taiwan	1,879		
Thailand	200,000–800,000	Thailand's Health System Research Institute reports that children in prostitution make up 40% of prostitutes in Thailand. Main article: Child prostitution in Thailand	
Ukraine	at least 15,000 girls aged 14–19	Main article: Child prostitution in Ukraine	
United States	100,000–1,000,000	In 2001, the University of Pennsylvania School of Social Work suggested that as many as 300,000 American youth may be at risk of commercial sexual exploitation at any time. However, over 10 years only approximately 827 cases a year had been reported to police departments. Thus, the Center for Court Innovation in New York City estimated in 2008 that there were far fewer commercially sexually exploited children than the 300,000 and far more than the 827 suggested by these two most widely read sources. Later, in 2013, the National Center for Missing & Exploited Children (NCMEC) documented over 10,000 reports of child sex trafficking, reporting that this only represents a "tiny percentage" of the actual child sex trafficking. See also: Sex trafficking in the United States § Commercial sexual exploitation of children	
Zambia	70,000		

== Demographics ==
The people who buy sex from minors are most often men who try to "rationalize their sexual involvement with children."

Though most child prostitutes are girls, advocates point out that boys are also exploited, and that this is often overlooked and more strongly stigmatized. An ECPAT-USA study found that though gay, bisexual, and questioning boys were represented at higher percentage than the general population, the majority of boys in prostitution were heterosexual in sexual orientation despite typically performing homosexual acts.

== Views ==
=== Public perception ===
Anthropologist Heather Montgomery writes that society has a largely negative perception of prostitution of children, in part because the children are often viewed as having been abandoned or sold by their parents and families. The International Labour Organization includes the prostitution of children in its list of the "worst forms of child labour". At the 1996 World Congress Against the Commercial Sexual Exploitation of Children it was called "a crime against humanity", "torture", and "slavery". Virginia Kendall, a district judge and expert on child exploitation and human trafficking, and T. Markus Funk, an attorney and law professor, write that the subject is an emotional one and that there are various perspectives about its prevention:

The topic of proscribing and punishing child exploitation triggers intense emotions. While there is general consensus that child sexual exploitation, whether through the Internet, forced prostitution, the international or domestic trafficking of children for sex, or molestation, is on the rise, observers in the United States and elsewhere find little common ground on the questions of how serious such conduct is, or what, if anything, must be done to address it.

Investigative journalist Julian Sher states that widespread stereotypes about the prostitution of children continued into the 1990s, when the first organized opposition arose and police officers began working to dispel common misconceptions. Criminologist Roger Matthews writes that concerns over pedophilia and child sexual abuse, as well as shifting perceptions of youth, led the public to see a sharp difference between prostitution of children and adult prostitution. While the latter is generally frowned upon, the former is seen as intolerable. Additionally, he states, children are increasingly viewed as "innocent" and "pure" and their prostitution as paramount to slavery. Through the shift in attitude, the public began to see minors involved in the sex trade as victims rather than as perpetrators of a crime, needing rehabilitation rather than punishment.

=== Opposition ===
Though campaigns against prostitution of children originated in the 1800s, the first mass protests against the practice occurred in the 1990s in the United States, led largely by ECPAT (End Child Prostitution in Asian Tourism). The group, which historian Junius P. Rodriguez describes as "the most significant of the campaigning groups against child prostitution", originally focused on the issue of children being exploited in Southeast Asia by Western tourists. Women's rights groups and anti-tourism groups joined to protest the practice of sex tourism in Bangkok, Thailand. The opposition to sex tourism was spurred on by an image of a Thai youth in prostitution, published in Time and by the publication of a dictionary in the United Kingdom describing Bangkok as "a place where there are a lot of prostitutes". Cultural anthropologists Susan Dewey and Patty Kelly write that though they were unable to inhibit sex tourism and rates of prostitution of children continued to rise, the groups "galvanized public opinion nationally and internationally" and succeeded in getting the media to cover the topic extensively for the first time. ECPAT later expanded its focus to protest child prostitution globally.

The late 1990s and early 2000s also saw the creation of a number of shelters and rehabilitation programs for prostituted children, and the police began to actively investigate the issue. The National Human Trafficking Resource Center (NHTRC) was later established by the Polaris Project as a national, toll-free hotline, available to answer calls from anywhere in the United States, 24 hours a day, seven days a week, every day of the year. The hotline was designed to allow callers to report tips and receive information on human trafficking.

The opposition to prostitution of children and sexual slavery spread to Europe and elsewhere, and organizations pushed for prostituted children to be recognized as victims rather than offenders. The issue remained prominent in the following years, and various campaigns and organizations continued into the 2000s and 2010s.

== History ==
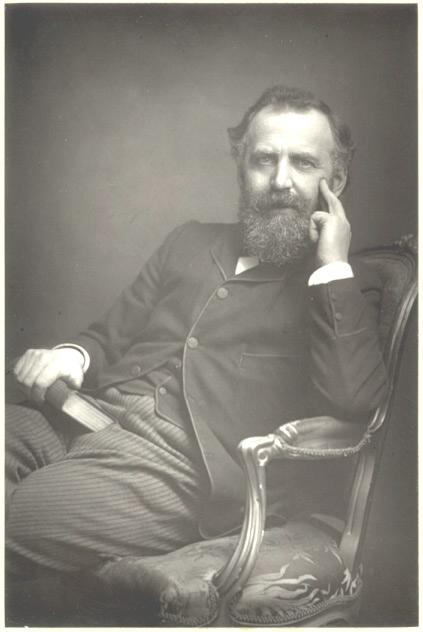
William Thomas Stead in 1881

Prostitution of children dates to antiquity. Prepubescent boys were commonly prostituted in brothels in ancient Greece and Rome. According to Ronald Flowers, the "most beautiful and highest born Egyptian maidens were forced into prostitution... and they continued as prostitutes until their first menstruation." Chinese and Indian children were commonly sold by their parents into prostitution. Parents in India sometimes dedicated their female children to the Hindu temples, where they became "devadasis". Traditionally a high status in society, the devadasis were originally tasked with maintaining and cleaning the temples of the Hindu deity to which they were assigned (usually the goddess Renuka) and learning skills such as music and dancing. However, as the system evolved, their role became that of a temple prostitute, and the girls, who were "dedicated" before puberty, were required to prostitute themselves to upper-class men. The practice has since been outlawed but still exists.

In Europe, child prostitution flourished until the late 1800s; minors accounted for 50% of individuals involved in prostitution in Paris. A scandal in 19th-century England caused the government there to raise the age of consent. In July 1885, William Thomas Stead, editor of The Pall Mall Gazette, published "The Maiden Tribute of Modern Babylon", four articles describing an extensive underground sex trafficking ring that reportedly sold children to adults. Stead's reports focused on a 13-year-old girl, Eliza Armstrong, who was sold for £5 (the equivalent of around £500 in 2012), then taken to a midwife to have her virginity verified. The age of consent was raised from 13 to 16 within a week of publication. During this period, the term white slavery came to be used throughout Europe and the United States to describe prostituted children.

== See also ==
- Child grooming
- Commercial sexual exploitation of children
- International instruments relevant to prostitution of children
- OneChild
- Prostitution in Sweden ("Swedish model" that criminalizes buying sex but not selling it)
- Honor killing § Victims of rape

== Bibliography ==
- Bagley, Christopher; King, Kathleen (2004). Child Sexual Abuse: The Search for Healing. Routledge. ISBN 978-0203392591.
- Brown, Louise (2001). Sex Slaves: The Trafficking of Women in Asia. Virago Press. ISBN 978-1860499036.
- Chan, Jennifer (2004). Gender and Human Rights Politics in Japan: Global Norms and Domestic Networks. Stanford University Press. ISBN 978-0804750226.
- Clark, Robin; Freeman Clark, Judith; Adamec, Christine A. (2007). The Encyclopedia of Child Abuse. Infobase Publishing. ISBN 978-0788146060.
- Cossins, Anne (2000). Masculinities, Sexualities and Child Sexual Abuse. Martinus Nijhoff Publishers. ISBN 978-9041113559.
- Cowan, Jane K.; Wilson, Richard J. (2001). Culture and Rights: Anthropological Perspectives. Cambridge University Press. ISBN 978-0521797351.
- De Chesnay, Mary (2013). Sex Trafficking: A Clinical Guide for Nurses. Springer Publishing Company. ISBN 978-0826171160.
- Dewey, Susan; Kelly, Patty (2011). Policing Pleasure: Sex Work, Policy, and the State in Global Perspective. Cambridge University Press. ISBN 978-0521797351.
- Fine, Gary Alan; Ellis, Bill (2011). The Global Grapevine: Why Rumors of Terrorism, Immigration, and Trade Matter. NYU Press. ISBN 978-0814785119.
- Flowers, Ronald (1998). The Prostitution of Women and Girls. McFarland. ISBN 978-0786404902.
- Flowers, Ronald (1994). The Victimization and Exploitation of Women and Children: A Study of Physical, Mental and Sexual Maltreatment in the United States. McFarland. ISBN 978-0899509785.
- Institute of Social Sciences (New Delhi, India); National Human Rights Commission (2005). Trafficking in Women and Children in India. Orient Blackswan. ISBN 978-8125028451.
- Jaffe, Maureen; Rosen, Sonia (1997). Forced Labor: The Prostitution of Children: Symposium Proceedings. Diane Publishing. ISBN 978-0788146060.
- Jensen, Derrick (2004). The Culture of Make Believe. Chelsea Green Publishing. ISBN 978-1603581837.
- Kendall, Virginia M.; Funk, Markus T. (2012). Child Exploitation and Trafficking: Examining the Global Challenges and U.S Responses. Rowman & Littlefield. ISBN 978-1442209800.
- Lim, Lin Lean (1998). The Sex Sector: The Economic and Social Bases of Prostitution in Southeast Asia. International Labour Organization. ISBN 978-9221095224.
- Madsen, Richard; Strong, Tracy B. (2009). The Many and the One: Religious and Secular Perspectives on Ethical Pluralism in the Modern World. Princeton University Press. ISBN 978-1400825592.
- Matthews, Roger (2008). Prostitution, Politics & Policy. Routledge. ISBN 978-0203930878.
- Narayan, O.P. (2005). Harnessing Child Development: Children and the culture of human. Gyan Publishing House. ISBN 978-8182053007.
- O'Connor, Vivienne M.; Rausch, Colette; Klemenčič, Goran; Albrecht, Hans-Jörg (2007). Model Codes for Post-conflict Criminal Justice: Model criminal code. US Institute of Peace Press. ISBN 978-1601270122.
- Panter-Brick, Catherine; Smith, Malcolm T. (2000). Abandoned Children. Cambridge University Press. ISBN 978-0521775557.
- Penn, Michael L. (2003). Overcoming Violence Against Women and Girls: The International Campaign to Eradicate a Worldwide Problem. Rowman & Littlefield. ISBN 978-0742525009.
- Regehr, Cheryl; Roberts, Albert R.; Wolbert Burgess, Ann (2012). Victimology: Theories and Applications. Jones & Bartlett Publishers. ISBN 978-1449665333.
- Rodriguez, Junius P. (2011). Slavery in the Modern World: A History of Political, Social, and Economic Oppression. ABC-CLIO. ISBN 978-1851097883.
- Sher, Julian (2011). Somebody's Daughter: The Hidden Story of America's Prostituted Children and the Battle to Save Them. Chicago Review Press. ISBN 978-1569768334.
- Whetsell-Mitchell, Juliann (1995). Rape of the Innocent: Understanding and Preventing Child Sexual Abuse. Taylor and Francis. ISBN 978-1560323945.
