= Worst Forms of Hazards faced by Children at Work =

Child labor assessment framework

The Worst Forms of Hazards faced by Children at Work is a provision in the Worst Forms of Child Labour Recommendation (No. 190) adopted by the International Labour Organization (ILO) in 1999. It sets out the framework for examining and assessing, "work which, by its nature or the circumstances in which it is carried out, is likely to harm the health, safety, or morals or children" (C182, Article 3d).

This effort is an attempt to complement the earlier list of worst forms of child labour. According to the ILO, "hazardous" child labour is the largest category of the "worst forms" of child labour. An estimated 115 million children, aged 5–17, work in dangerous conditions in sectors including agriculture, mining, construction, manufacturing, service industries and domestic service. It is found in both industrialised and developing countries. Kids can take on hazardous work at very early ages. The ILO estimates that some 22,000 children are killed at work every year worldwide. The numbers of those injured or made ill because of their work are not known.

== General guidelines ==
The ILO provides the following guidelines for work considered unsafe for children, such as:

- Involving toxic chemicals or fumes, high-powered equipment or vehicles, cutting, pounding or blasting
- Taking place underground, under water, at heights, in isolation, at night or in direct sunlight
- Involving long hours without breaks
- Carrying heavy loads
- In the presence of alcohol, drugs or crime
- In the presence of dangerous animals or insects
- Absent easy access to safe water or food
- In jobs with high injury rates

== Examples ==
- Hauling wagons in underground mining
- Contact with solvents and glues in the leather industry
- Glassworks (potential lead poisoning)
- Gold-mining (potential mercury poisoning)
- Underwater jobs without protective equipment, such as a wetsuit or air supply, in the fishing industry
- Agriculture (potential pesticide exposure)
- Bearing heavy loads in the construction industry
- Exposure to radioactive materials in the nuclear power plant

== See also ==
- Child labour
- Worst Forms of Child Labour Convention (Convention No. 182)
- International Programme on the Elimination of Child Labour (IPEC)
- Time-Bound Programmes for the Eradication of the Worst forms of Child Labour
