= Cheryl Perera =

Canadian children's rights activist

- Occupation: Children's rights activist

Cheryl Perera (born 1986) is a Canadian children's rights activist. As a teenager, she founded OneChild, a non-governmental organization which seeks to eliminate the commercial sexual exploitation of children abroad. For her work, and in particular her achievements at a young age, Perera has received several accolades.

== Advocacy ==
Perera first became involved in children's rights advocacy work after researching child sexual exploitation and sex tourism in Thailand for a high school class project. In 2002, at 17, she took three-and-a-half months off from school to continue her research in her parents' home country, Sri Lanka. Shocked at the ease with which children could be exploited, she met with a Sri Lankan Presidential Advisor and the National Child Protection Authority to discuss the problems she saw.

The meeting led her to serve as bait herself in a sting operation to catch a sexual predator. Perera met with a man who had posted a solicitation for a 15-year-old girl on the Internet. After leading him to talk about his intentions on tape, they went to a nearby hotel where police were waiting to make the arrest.

Sri Lankan government invited her to serve as an adviser on child protection, but then she declined. Perera returned to Canada, caught up on homework, graduated and enrolled at the University of Toronto. In 2005, she founded OneChild, a youth-driven and youth-run non-profit organization, in 2005. She was successful in lobbying the Canadian Tourism Board and the travel industry to take measures against child sexual tourism abroad, like showing a video about child sex tourism on some Air Canada flights.

Perera has taken her advocacy to several countries struggling with sex tourism and human trafficking. In 2006 she went with a group to the Philippines to meet with the People's Recovery, Empowerment and Development Assistance Foundation (PREDA), an organization which provides support for former sex workers, and to provide monetary support for the creation of a rehabilitation center for rescued children. In 2010 she traveled to Pattaya, Thailand and other sex tourism destinations in Thailand and Southeast Asia, meeting with agencies to learn more about local issues, efforts, and where help is needed.

For her activism and role in the law enforcement operation, Perera was given the title "President's Nominee on Child Protection", a permanent placement in the Presidential Secretariat. Perera has been recognized as one of "Canada's Top 20 Under 20", received the 2005 Impact Entrepreneur of the Year award, and was named a BRICK Award Winner in 2007.

In 2016 the World Economic Forum named Perera one of its Young Global Leaders. In April 2017, Perera was among 10 Canadian women recognized by L'Oreal Paris "Women of Worth" program. In December 2018, she participated in the UN-sponsored The Global Compact on Migration conference in Marrakesh.

== See also ==
- Human trafficking in Canada
- Prostitution of children
