= Worst Forms of Child Labour Convention =

International Labour Organization Convention

Worst Forms of Child Labour Convention, 1999
Convention Concerning the Prohibition and Immediate Action for the Elimination of the Worst Forms of Child Labour
- Party Convention not in force Convention not applied (dependent territory) Non ILO-member
- Signed: 17 June 1999
- Location: Geneva
- Effective: 19 November 2000
- Condition: universal ratification by all 187 members of the UN International Labour Organization (ILO)
- Parties: 187
- Depositary: Director-General of the International Labour Office
- Languages: English and French (Article 16)

The Convention Concerning the Prohibition and Immediate Action for the Elimination of the Worst Forms of Child Labour, known in short as the Worst Forms of Child Labour Convention, was adopted by the International Labour Organization (ILO) in 1999 as ILO Convention No 182. It is one of eight ILO fundamental conventions.

By ratifying this Convention No. 182, a country commits itself to taking immediate action to prohibit and eliminate the worst forms of child labour, including slavery, child prostitution, use of children in criminal activities, and dangerous labour. The convention is enjoying the fastest pace of ratifications in the ILO's history since 1919.

The ILO's International Programme on the Elimination of Child Labour (IPEC) is responsible for assisting countries in this regard as well as monitoring compliance. One of the methods used by IPEC to assist countries in this regard are Time-bound Programmes.

The ILO also adopted the Worst Forms of Child Labour Recommendation No 190 in 1999. This recommendation contains, among others, recommendations on the types of hazards that should be considered for inclusion within a country-based definition of Worst Forms of Hazards faced by Children at Work.

Convention No 182 has been signed by all ILO Member States by 4 August 2020. This has become the fastest ratified agreement in the UN's 101-year history.

== Purpose of the Convention ==
The elimination of child labour was one of the main goals of the ILO. According to the UN agency, 152 million children worldwide are affected by the convention, almost half of which do dangerous work. Most child labour is carried out in the agricultural sector, mainly due to poverty and the difficulties faced by parents. The convention supports the prohibition and elimination of the worst forms of child labour, including slavery, forced labour and trafficking in human beings. It prohibits the use of children in armed conflicts, prostitution and pornography, illegal activities such as drug trafficking and dangerous work. According to the ILO, the proportion of child labour fell by almost 40 percent between 2000 and 2016 as the ratification rate increased and countries passed laws and policies, including the minimum age of employment.

== Ratifications ==
On 4 August 2020, the High Commissioner for Tonga in the United Kingdom, Hon. Titilupe Fanetupouvava'u Tuita-Tu'ivakanō, formally deposited the ratification instruments for this convention together with ILO Director-General, Guy Ryder. This is a historic event as it is the first time for an International Labor Convention to be ratified by all member states.

The convention has also not been extended to several non-metropolitan territories of states that ratified the convention:

State	Non-metropolitan territory
Australia	Norfolk Island
Denmark	Faroe Islands, Greenland
France	French Polynesia, New Caledonia, French Southern and Antarctic Territories
Kingdom of the Netherlands	Sint Maarten and the Caribbean Netherlands
New Zealand	Tokelau
United States	American Samoa, Guam, Northern Mariana Islands, Puerto Rico, United States Virgin Islands
United Kingdom	Anguilla, Bermuda, British Virgin Islands, Gibraltar, Isle of Man, Jersey, Montserrat

== Predefined worst forms of child labour ==
Article 3 of the International Labor Organization's Convention 182 includes forms of child labour, which are predefined as the worst forms of child labour, including the following:. They are also sometimes referred to as automatic worst forms of child labour.

The predefined worst forms of child labour are:

- all forms of slavery or practices similar to slavery, such as
  - the sale of a child;
  - trafficking of children, meaning the recruitment of children to do work far away from home and from the care of their families, in circumstances within which they are exploited;
  - debt bondage or any other form of bonded labour or serfdom;
  - forced or compulsory labour, including forced or compulsory recruitment of children for use in armed conflict;
- Commercial sexual exploitation of children (CSEC), including the use, procuring or offering of a child for:
  - prostitution, or
  - the production of pornography or for pornographic performances;
- use, procuring or offering of a child by others for illegal activities, also known as children used by adults in the commission of crime (CUBAC), including the trafficking or production of drugs
- work by its nature that is likely to harm the health, safety or morals of children

== Worst form hazards: To be defined by each ratifying country ==
The last category of worst form of child labour is work which by its nature or the circumstances is likely to harm the health, safety or morals of children, or Worst Forms of Hazards faced by Children at Work. Here the Convention recommended that the circumstances should be determined in consultation with organisations of employers and workers within a specific country. The Convention recommends that programmes of action should attend specifically to younger children, the girl child, hidden work situation in which girls are at special risk, and other groups of children with special vulnerabilities or needs. Worst Forms of Child Labour Recommendation No 190 contains recommendations on the types of hazards that should be considered to be included within a country-based definition of worst form hazards. This could lead to many deaths.

The worst forms of child labour that should be prohibited in ILO Recommendation No. 190 are:

- "Any work that exposes children to sexual abuse (physically or psychologically).
- Any work that is done underground, under water, at dangerous heights or in confined spaces.
- Any work that is done with dangerous machinery, equipment and tools.
- Any work that involves the manual handling or transport of heavy loads.
- Any work that is done in an unhealthy environment which may, for example, expose children to hazardous substances, agents or processes, or to temperatures, noise levels, or vibrations damaging to their health.
- Any work that is done under particularly difficult conditions such as work for long hours or during the night or work where the child is unreasonably confined to the premises of the employer."

== Country programmes on WFCL ==
Several programs exist (coordinated by the ILO or other UN organisations) to stimulate adherence to the convention:

- Programmes of the International Labour Organization addressing the worst forms of child labour
  - Time-Bound Programmes for the Eradication of the Worst forms of Child Labour;
  - International Programme on the Elimination of Child Labour;
  - Country programmes on Commercial sexual exploitation of children.

The Special Rapporteur on the sale of children, child prostitution and child pornography plays a role in the co-ordination of activities.
