= Human trafficking in Georgia (country) =

Forced prostitution and forced labor

Projection map of Georgia highlighting the disputed territories of Abkhazia and South Ossetia

Georgia ratified the 2000 UN TIP Protocol in September 2006.

== Background in 2010 ==
Human trafficking in Georgia was common, with people being subjected to forced prostitution and forced labor. In 2009, women and girls from Georgia were forced into prostitution in Georgia, Turkey, the United Arab Emirates, and Greece, and in recent years, cases of forced prostitution of Georgian victims have also been documented in Russia, Germany, and Austria. Men and women have been forced into labor in Georgia, Libya and Turkey. Men from Turkey were also forced into labor in the breakaway region of Abkhazia, which was outside the Georgian government's control.

The government of Georgia fully complied with the minimum standards for the elimination of trafficking. The government demonstrated strong efforts to identify and assist victims of trafficking and again increased its victim assistance funding to $312,000. The government also demonstrated impressive law enforcement success, significantly increasing the number of individuals convicted of trafficking, and again ensuring all convicted trafficking offenders served some time in prison. The Georgian government also demonstrated strong prevention efforts and continued its close partnership with anti-trafficking NGOs in both victim assistance and prevention efforts.

== International response ==
The U.S. State Department's Office to Monitor and Combat Trafficking in Persons placed the country in "Tier 1" in 2017 and 2023.

In 2023, the Organised Crime Index gave the country 5.5 out of 10 for human trafficking. It noted that this crime was mainly run by organised crime groups.

== Youth trafficking and sex work in 2012 ==
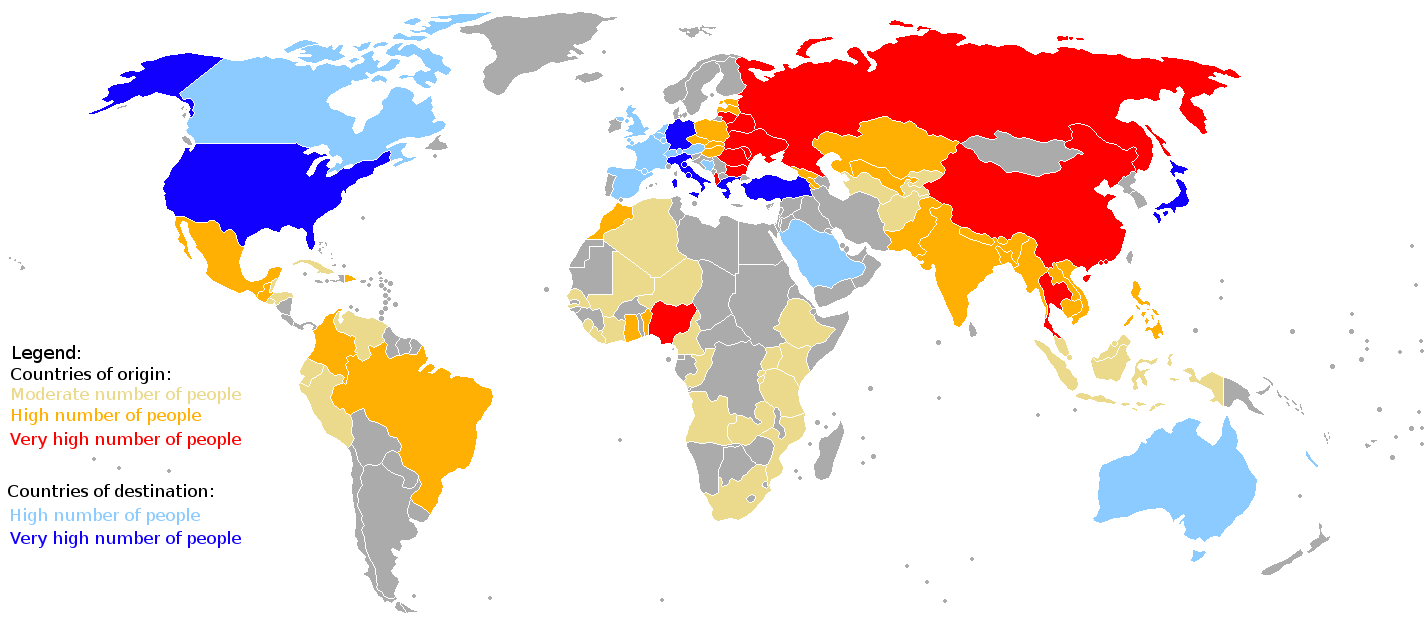
A schematic showing global human trafficking, with specific focus to women and children. Georgia is labelled on the map as being the trafficking origin for a 'high number of people'.

In 2012, Street children in Georgia, were particularly susceptible to exploitation through means of trafficking. Whether it be through begging or theft by third parties, including their parents, this subcategory of the population was considered to be at risk. Children working in agriculture and in the informal urban economy were especially vulnerable to forced labor.

Trafficking of children was a large concern within this area. Thousands of children living in the streets and in orphanages were trafficked annually. Some families experiencing economic hardship were forced to separate, which directly increased the number of children living on the streets in Georgia. This was a direct result of familial stress on the children, which often led to youth feeling responsible to take on means of supporting the family in hard times, by then bringing in money through illegal means.

As a large portion of children, who were susceptible to be drawn into the realm of trafficking, were first noted as high-risk youth and street children, it was noted that UNICEF estimated that 28.8 percent of children ages 5 to 14 years in Georgia were working in 1999. While the majority of working children worked in family businesses, and in agriculture in rural areas, there were reports of significant numbers of children, some as young as 5 years old, engaged in begging or working on the streets. Children as young as 9 years old were found working in markets, sometimes at night, and involved in carrying or loading wares. Children also worked in cafes, bistros, gas stations, and for street photographers. The relevance of these statistics annotated the sense that a majority of these working children were out in the community, as opposed to working within the safer confines of their homes. Having to go outside the home to work within the community at a young age played a role in the risk of being a youth in this area. According to the UN Committee on the Rights of the Child, police violence against street children was a problem. In general, there was a lack of social safety services for children living on the street, with disabilities or from dysfunctional households.

Children, especially young girls were commonly trafficked for the purposes of Commercial sexual exploitation of children, particularly for prostitution and pornography. In 2003, the statistical bureau of the Supreme Court reported 24 registered cases of the use of children in the drug trade and trafficking. This burden can then lead to negative impacts the female as they mature on both their sexual health, as well as concerns about their mental stability.

The government of Georgia fully complied with the minimum standards for the elimination of trafficking where children are involved. During 2012, however, local experts expressed serious concerns about the government's view of its trafficking problem and its lack of effective efforts in the first half of the reporting period to proactively identify victims of this serious crime. In 2012, the government increased the number of trafficking cases investigated and the percentage of prosecutions that resulted in convictions of trafficking offenders. The government also significantly increased funding for anti-trafficking training and trafficking prevention activities, including in the budgets of its shelters for victims. The government significantly increased the number of Georgian officials provided training on victim identification.

== Prosecution (2010) ==
The Government of Georgia demonstrated increased law enforcement efforts during the reporting period. Georgia prohibits all forms of trafficking in persons through Article 143 of its criminal code, which prescribes penalties ranging from seven to 20 years’ imprisonment. These penalties are sufficiently stringent and are commensurate with those for other serious crimes, such as rape. In 2009, the government investigated 33 trafficking cases, compared with 14 investigations in 2008. Authorities prosecuted 40 individuals for trafficking - including three individuals for forced labor - compared with 10 individuals prosecuted for sex trafficking in 2008.

Thirty-seven trafficking offenders were convicted in 2009, a significant increase from 10 convicted offenders in 2008. All 37 convicted trafficking offenders were sentenced to time in prison; none received a suspended sentence. The average sentence was 21 years’ imprisonment. There were no reports of trafficking-related complicity of law enforcement personnel from either NGOs or the government. In 2009, the government relied on partnerships with local NGOs and international organizations to provide trafficking training to approximately 170 prosecutors and judges. The training concentrated on mechanisms for proactive victim identification, special methods for investigation and the collection of evidence, and prosecution techniques, and highlighted the importance of partnerships with NGOs, social workers, and psychologists during victim interviews.

== Protection (2010) ==
The Georgian government maintained its significant victim assistance efforts over the reporting period. The government allocated a total of $312,000 for victim assistance during the reporting period; of that, it provided $150,000 to fully fund two government-run trafficking shelters, the same amount as funded in 2008. These shelters provided comprehensive victim assistance, including medical aid, psychological counseling, and legal assistance. Victim assistance was not conditional upon cooperating with law enforcement. The government continued to implement a formal mechanism for its officials to identify and refer victims for assistance. The government identified 48 victims in 2009 and referred 15 victims for assistance, an increase from 21 trafficking victims identified in 2008. The government provided shelter and comprehensive assistance to 15 victims, compared with 10 victims in 2008. The government also made available one-time compensation payments of $650 to trafficking victims in 2009. However, no victims applied for the funds during the reporting period. Five victims were given $600 each in 2008. Georgian authorities provided foreign victims legal alternatives to their removal to countries where they would face hardship or retribution; the Law on Legal Status of Foreigners provided a foreign person suspected of being a victim of trafficking the right to a residence permit even if authorities could not prove beyond a reasonable doubt that the person was a victim. In 2009, no foreign victims requested a residence permit. The government cooperated with IOM and fully funded the repatriation of one foreign victim during the reporting period. Victims were encouraged to assist law enforcement with trafficking investigations and prosecutions; 18 victims assisted law enforcement during the reporting period. There were no reports that victims were penalized for unlawful acts committed as a direct result of being trafficked.

== Prevention (2012) ==
The Government of Georgia sustained its efforts to prevent trafficking during the reporting period. The government produced and broadcast during the first six months of 2009 a short television public service announcement explaining the nature and danger of human trafficking. The Ministry of Education and Science produced a short television announcement targeting school-age children entitled “Do Not Trade Freedom for Slavery,” which was regularly aired on television.

The Government of Georgia improved its anti-trafficking prevention activities in 2011 and significantly increased cooperation with NGOs to conduct prevention campaigns. The government began enacting legislation in December 2011. They did this by authorizing the executive branch for the first time to make grants to NGOs. Pursuant to this legislation, the government provided small grants to two NGOs in early 2012 to work on projects related to public awareness of trafficking and information pertaining to victim identification. It also entered into memoranda of understanding with leading NGOs to expand and coordinate cooperation in addressing trafficking.

During the year the government conducted multiple information campaigns utilizing a broad array of media, including public service announcements, seminars, and television broadcasts throughout the country. The Civil Registry Agency continued its practice of distributing over 20,000 anti-trafficking related pamphlets when it issued new passports to citizens. The government also conducted numerous outreach events including some focused on specific high risk segments of the population, such as university and high schools students, internally displaced persons, and ethnic minorities living in the regions, would were more likely to be recognized as high-risk groups. Events included numerous panel discussions, a film screening, a peer education campaign, and an essay contest, all which provided research as well as preventative ideas regarding human trafficking in the country. The government distributed 10,000 donor-funded trafficking indicator cards to front-line responders, including law enforcement and border officials. In coordination with NGOs, the government posted anti-trafficking posters on cross-border buses and distributed multilingual leaflets to cross-border truck drivers and others. In November 2011, authorities created a high-level, steering committee to oversee the implementation of an EU-funded project to address street children. In March 2011, the government approved its new anti-trafficking National Action Plan for 2011–2012, produced with extensive collaboration with the NGO community. Because their focus was on human and child trafficking specifically, during the reporting period, the government did not initiate any campaigns to reduce demand for commercial sex acts.

== See also ==
- Human rights in Georgia (country)
- Human trafficking in Europe
