= International Programme on the Elimination of Child Labour =

The International Programme on the Elimination of Child Labour (IPEC) is a programme that the International Labour Organization has run since 1992. IPEC's aim is to work towards the progressive elimination of child labour by strengthening national capacities to address child labour problems, and by creating a worldwide movement to combat it.

== About ==
IPEC's priority target groups are children in worst forms of child labour such as slavery and practices similar to slavery, such as bonded child labour and children in hazardous working conditions and occupations. IPEC also focuses on children who are particularly vulnerable, i.e. very young working children (below 12 years of age), and working girl children.

The political will and commitment of individual governments to address child labour in cooperation with employers' and workers' organizations, other non-governmental organizations and relevant parties in society – such as universities and the media – is the starting point for all IPEC action. Sustainability is built in from the start through an emphasis on in-country "ownership". Support is given to partner organizations to develop and implement measures which aim at preventing child labour, withdrawing children from hazardous work and providing alternatives, and improving the working conditions as a transitional measure towards the elimination of child labour.

== Strategy ==
A phased and multi-sectoral strategy is applied consisting of the following steps:

- Motivating an alliance of partners to acknowledge and act against child labour.
- Carrying out a situational analysis to find out about child labour problems in a country.
- Assisting with developing and implementing national policies on child labour problems.
- Strengthening existing organizations and setting up institutional mechanisms.
- Creating awareness on the problem nationwide, in communities and workplaces.
- Promoting the development and application of protective legislation.
- Supporting direct action with (potential) child workers for demonstration purposes, including Time-bound Programmes to address Worst Forms of Child Labour Convention.
- Replicating and expanding successful projects into the programmes of partners.
- Mainstreaming child labour issues into socio-economic policies, programmes and budgets.

== See also ==
- Children's rights movement
- Evolving capacities
- World Day Against Child Labour
- Worst Forms of Hazards faced by Children at Work
