= Worst Forms of Child Labour Recommendation =

Convention

The Worst Forms of Child Labour Recommendation was adopted by the International Labour Organization (ILO) in 1999 as ILO Recommendation No 190. The provisions of this Recommendation supplement those of the Worst Forms of Child Labour Convention (Convention No 182, referred to below as ‘the Convention’) and should be applied in conjunction with them. This article should be read together with that on the convention.

The provisions of the Recommendation include the following:

- What programmes of action referred to in Article 6 of the Worst Forms of Child Labour Convention should aim at (Article I);
- What should be considered when ratifying countries determine in terms of Article 3(d) of the Convention what the Worst Forms of Hazards faced by Children at Work in those countries are (Article II);
- That detailed information and statistical data on the nature and extent of child labour should be compiled and kept up to date (Article III(5) to (7);
- That ratifying countries should establish or designate appropriate national mechanisms to monitor the implementation of national provisions for the prohibition and elimination of the worst forms of child labour (Article III(8));
- That ratifying countries should, in so far as it is compatible with national law, cooperate with international efforts aimed at the prohibition and elimination of the worst forms of child labour (Article III(11));
- That ratifying countries should provide that the pre-defined worst forms of child labour are criminal offences and also provide for other criminal, civil or administrative remedies to ensure the effective enforcement of national provisions for the prohibition and elimination of the worst forms of child labour (Article III(12) to (14));
- A list of other measures that could be used to prohibit and eliminate the worst forms of child labour (Article III(15));
- That enhanced international cooperation and/or assistance among ratifying countries for the prohibition and effective elimination of the worst forms of child labour should complement national efforts (Article III(16)).
