= Child labour in Africa =

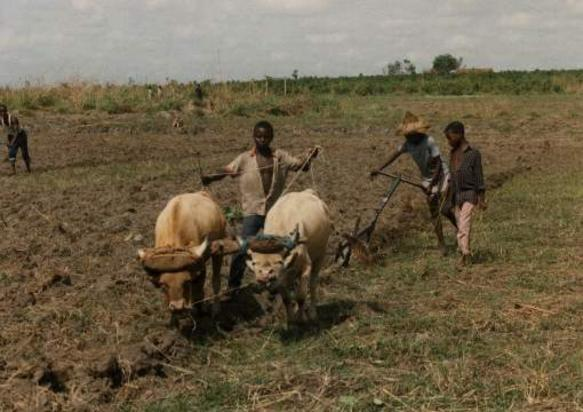
In Africa, children work with their families and communities as part of training and aiding production, and this is not defined as harmful or exploitative child labour. The training includes ploughing (above), weeding, herding livestock, fertilizer, pesticide application and harvesting under supervision and local regulations.

Child labour in Africa is generally defined based on two factors: type of work and minimum appropriate age of the work. If a child is involved in an activity that is harmful to his/her physical and mental development, he/she is generally considered as a child labourer. That is, any work that is mentally, physically, socially or morally dangerous and harmful to children, and interferes with their schooling by depriving them of the opportunity to attend school or requiring them to attempt to combine school attendance with excessively long and heavy work. Appropriate minimum age for each work depends on the effects of the work on the physical health and mental development of children. ILO Convention No. 138 suggests the following minimum age for admission to employment under which, if a child works, he/she is considered as a child laborer: 18 years old for hazardous works (Any work that jeopardizes children's physical, mental or moral health), and 13–15 years old for light works (any work that does not threaten children's health and safety, or prevent them from schooling or vocational orientation and training), although 12–14 years old may be permitted for light works under strict conditions in very poor countries. Another definition proposed by ILO's Statistical Information and Monitoring Program on Child Labor (SIMPOC) defines a child as a child labourer if he/she is involved in an economic activity, and is under 12 years old and works one or more hours per week, or is 14 years old or under and works at least 14 hours per week, or is 14 years old or under and works at least one hour per week in activities that are hazardous, or is 17 or under and works in an "unconditional worst form of child labor" (prostitution, children in bondage or forced labor, armed conflict, trafficked children, pornography, and other illicit activities).

Africa has the world's highest incidence rates of child labour. A report by the United Nations' International Labour Organization reveals that in 2016 nearly 1 out of every 5 children partakes in child labor. The problem is severe in Sub-Saharan Africa where more than 40% of all children aged 5–14 labour for survival, or about 48 million children.

Although poverty is generally considered as the primary cause of child labour in Africa, recent studies show that the relationship between child labour and poverty is not as simple as a downward linear relationship. A study published in 2016 "Understanding child labour beyond the standard economic assumption of monetary poverty" illustrates that a broad range of factors – on the demand- and supply-side and at the micro and macro levels – can affect child labour; it argues that structural, geographic, demographic, cultural, seasonal and school-supply factors can also simultaneously influence whether children work or not, questioning thereby the common assumption that monetary poverty is always the most important cause. In another study, Oryoie, Alwang, and Tideman (2017) show that child labour generally decreases as per capita land holding (as an indicator of a household's wealth in rural areas) increases, but there can be an upward bump in the relationship between child labour and landholding near the middle of the range of land per capita. In addition to poverty, Lack of resources, together with other factors such as credit constraints, income shocks, school quality, and parental attitudes toward education are all associated with child labour.

The International Labour Organization estimates that agriculture is the largest employer of child labour in Africa. Vast majority are unpaid family workers.

The United Nations declared 2021 as the International Year for the Elimination of Child Labour.

== Cultural history ==
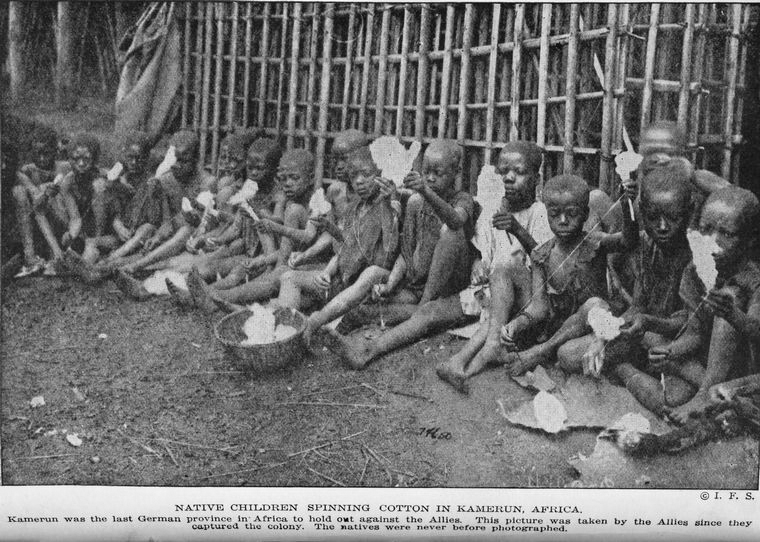
Africa has a long history of child labour. Above, colonial Cameroon children weaving in 1919.

Children in Africa have worked in farms and at home over a long history. This is not unique to Africa; large number of children have worked in agriculture and domestic situations in America, Europe and every other human society, throughout history, prior to 1950s. Scholars suggest that this work, especially in rural areas, is a form of schooling and vocational education, where children learned the arts and skills from their parents, and as adults continued to work in the same hereditary occupation. Even after retirement from formal work, Africans often revert to the skills they learnt when they were young, for example farming, for a living or enterprise. Bass claims this is particularly true in the African context.

Africa is a highly diverse and culturally continent. In parts of this continent, farming societies adhere to a system of patrilineal lineages and clans. The young train with the adults. The family and kinsfolk provide a cultural routine that help children learn useful practical skills and enables these societies to provide for itself in the next generation. Historically, there were no formal schools, instead, children were informally schooled by working informally with their family and kin from a very early age. Child labor in Africa, as in other parts of the world, was also viewed as a way to instill a sense of responsibility and a way of life in children particularly in rural, subsistence agricultural communities. In rural Pare people of northern Tanzania, for example, five-year-olds would assist adults in tending crops, nine-year-olds help carry fodder for animals and responsibilities scaled with age.

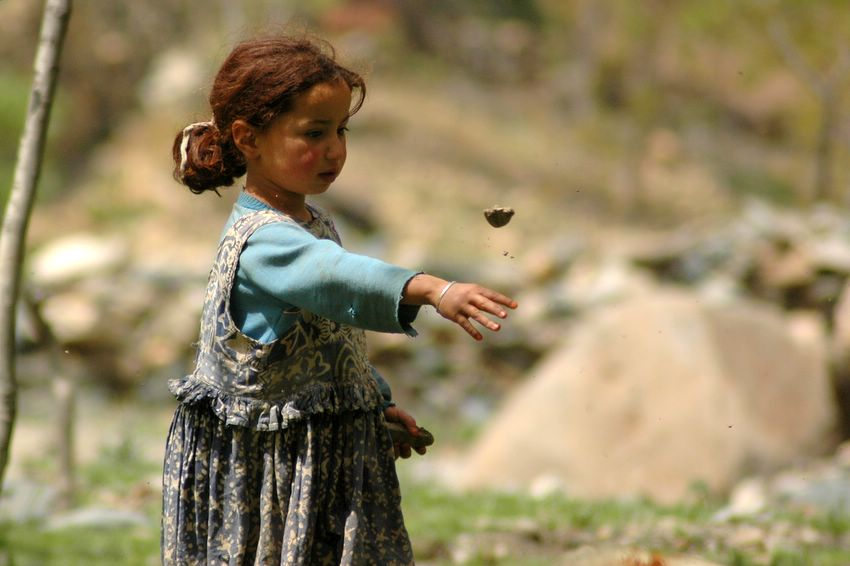
A Berber shepherd girl in the Atlas Mountains of Morocco

In northern parts of sub-Saharan Africa, Islam is a major influence. Begging and child labour was considered as a service in exchange for Quranic education, and in some cases continues to this day. These children aged 7–13, for example, were called almudos in Gambia, or talibés in Senegal. The parents placed their children with marabout or serin, a cleric or Quranic teacher. Here, they would split their time between begging and studying the Quran. This practice fit with one of the five pillars of Islam, the responsibility to engage in zakat, or almsgiving.

The growth of colonial rule in Africa, from 1650 to 1950, by powers such as Britain, France, Belgium, Germany and Netherlands encouraged and continued the practice of child labour. Colonial administrators preferred Africa's traditional kin-ordered modes of production, that is hiring a household for work not just the adults. Millions of children worked in colonial agricultural plantations, mines and domestic service industries. Children in these colonies between the ages of 5–14 were hired as apprentice without pay in exchange for learning a craft. Colonial British laws, for example, offered the native people ownership to some of the native land in exchange for making labor of wife and children available to colonial government's needs such as in farms and as picannins.

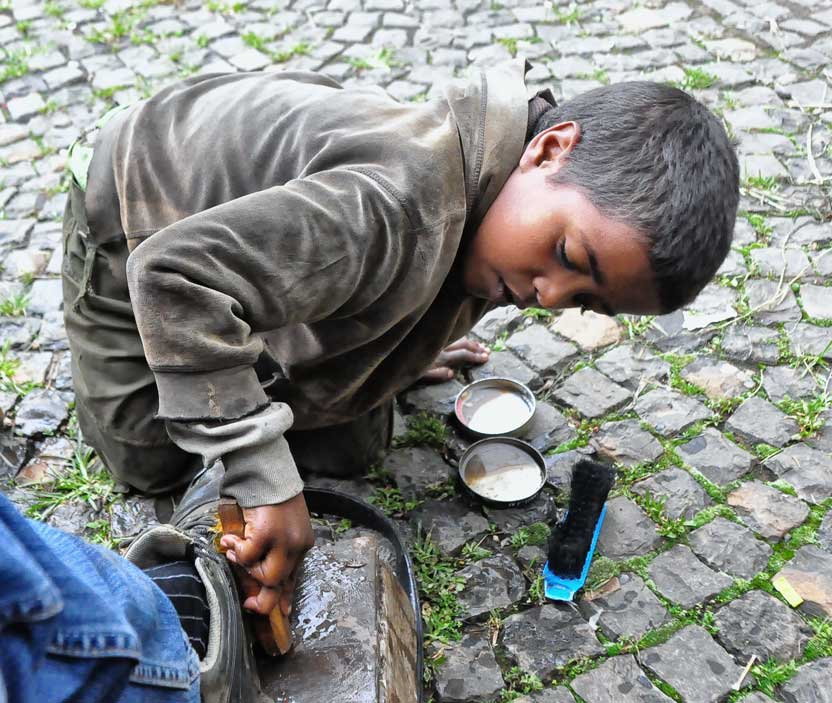
A boy shoeshiner in Gondar, Ethiopia

Child labour was also encouraged by new tax laws. British and French colonial empires introduced new taxes to help pay for the local colonial government expenses. One of these, called the Head Tax, imposed a tax payable by every person, in some cases as young as 8-year-old. Regional populations rebelled against such taxes, hid their children, and in most part had to ensure their children were involved in economic activity to pay such taxes and pay their living expenses. Christian mission schools in Africa stretching from Zambia to Nigeria too required work from children, and in exchange provided religious education, not secular education.

In late colonial period, colonial governments attempted to run schools and educate children in parts of Africa. These effort were generally unsuccessful both in terms of enrollment and impact. Few children enrolled. Even when children enrolled, it did not necessarily mean regular attendance. Chronic absenteeism, or children dropped out of the schools to instead "go to sea with the fishermen." Jack Lord claims in his reviews of scholarly papers of African colonial history, that late colonial era experience suggests children and families made decisions based on complex combination of economic factors such as household income, state of the family, and cultural factors that considered working with families as a form of education and a form of developing social and human capital.

== Contemporary child labour ==
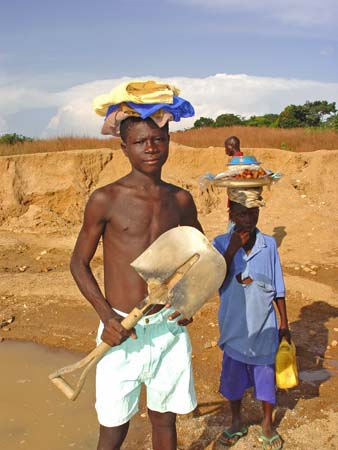
Child labour is common in informal mining industry of Africa. Above, children engaged in diamond mining in Sierra Leone.

Agriculture alone employs more than 30% of all African children aged 10–14. Informal economy such as small scale artisanal mines is another significant employer of child labour.

=== Burkina Faso ===
According to the United States Department of Labor in 2012, 37.8% of children in Burkina Faso aged 5-14 were working, while another 13.6% were both going to school and working.

Children working in granite quarries and gold mines were working 6 to 7 days a week for up to 14 hours per day. So-called "payment" is in the form of food to eat and a place to sleep. Since that time, the government has adopted a National Action Plan, and in collaboration with Interpol, have since have rescued many children from child trafficking.

By 2023, the percentage of children working in Burkina Faso had dropped slightly to 35.7%, according to the United States' Department of Labor.

Christian Children's Fund of Canada (CCFC) has partnered with EDUCO, a fellow member of the ChildFund Alliance, to implement a European Union-funded project in north Burkina to prevent children from working in mines.

=== Democratic Republic of the Congo ===
In 2008, Bloomberg claimed child labour in copper and cobalt mines of DR Congo that supplied Chinese companies. The children dig the ore by hand, carry sacks of ores on their backs, and these are then purchased by these companies. Over 60 of Katanga's 75 processing plants are owned by Chinese companies and 90 percent of the region's minerals go to China. An African NGO report claimed 80,000 child labourers under the age of 15, or about 40% of all miners, were supplying ore to Chinese companies in this African region.

BBC, in 2012, accused Glencore of using child labour in its mining and smelting operations of Africa. Glencore denied it used child labour, and said it has strict policy of not using child labour. Glencore claimed being aware of child miners who it claimed were part of a group of artisanal miners. They had without authorisation raided Glencore's concession since 2010, and the company claimed it has been pleading with the government to remove the artisanal miners from its concession.

About 4.7 million children aged 5–14 work in Congo. In addition to copper mines, children with their families participate in illegal artisanal mining of cobalt, wolframite, cassiterite, columbite-tantalite, gold, diamonds. As of 2024, an estimated 40,000 children work in artisanal mining in the Congo. Many of these use hammers to break free the ore, pour harsh chemicals with no protective equipment, and manually transport rocks from deep pit or open pit mines. Workers including children suffer injuries, amputations and death as the result of the hazardous working conditions and mine tunnel collapses during artisanal mining of cobalt which is used in cell phones. Children also work in agriculture and continue to be recruited as child soldiers for Congolese National Army and various rebel groups. Child labour is commonly visible on the streets of Kinshasa region.

=== Egypt ===
In 2013, the U.S. Department of Labor's report Findings on the Worst Forms of Child Labor in Egypt stated that "children in Egypt are engaged in child labor, including in agriculture and domestic service" and that "the Government has not addressed gaps in its legal and enforcement framework to protect children". Statistics in the report show that 6.7% of Egyptian children aged 5 to 14 are working children and that 55% of them work in agriculture. In December 2014, the department's List of Goods Produced by Child Labor or Forced Labor mentioned 2 goods produced under such working conditions: cotton and limestone. Quarrying limestone has been determined by national law as a hazardous activity. Efforts to reduce child labor have increased. For example, from April 1, 2016, to April 30, 2018, the International Labor Organization embarked on a project combating child labor in Egypt. In 2018, the Ministry of Social Solidarity provided financial aid to over 1.6 million people to help fund childhood education in order to decrease the amount of child labor.

=== Ghana ===
The 2010 United States Department of Labor estimated over 2.7 million child laborers in Ghana, or about 43% of all children aged 5–14. 78.7% of these children work in agriculture, 17.6% in fishing and transportation services, and 3.7% in industry, which includes manufacturing work and mining. In Ghana 64% of children seek work for financial reasons, making it the leading driver for child labor in the region. Most children working in rural areas are working on family farms and often combine schooling with their work. In Urban areas, such as Accra and Ashanti children are often not enrolled in school and are often engaged in artisanal fishing and domestic services. Child porters, locally called kayaye, work in urban areas and some of them are as young as 6 years.

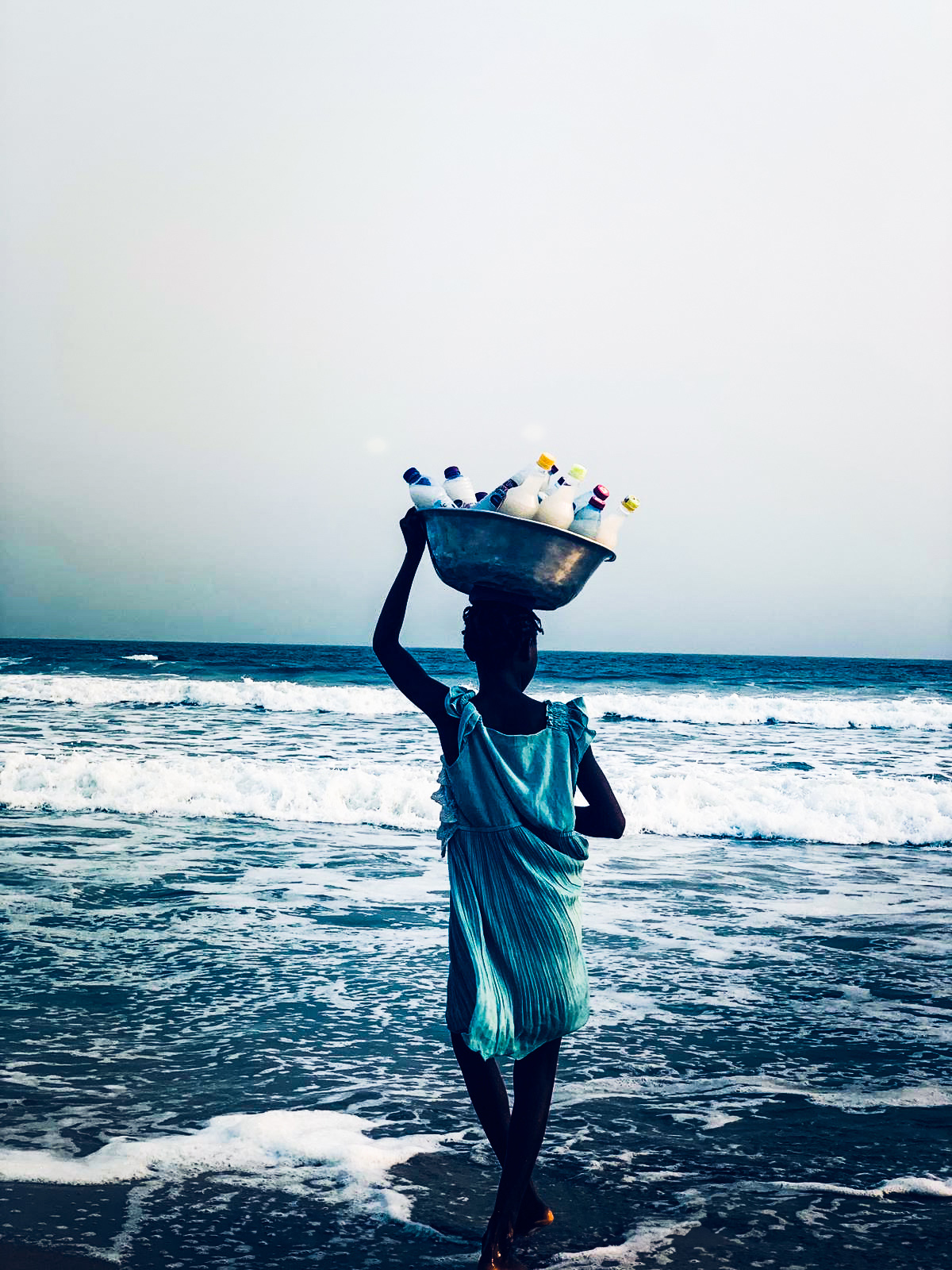
A young 'kayaye' girl engaged in selling palm wine in Ghana

Agriculture, fishing and artisan mining were the largest employers.

In southern Volta region, children work in religious servitude for a period ranging between few months to three years. They are known as trokosi (literally: wife of a god), fiashidi, or vudusi. This practice requires young girls to work and serve the religious order, in order to atone for family members’ alleged sins or as an offering for the family's good fortune. This practice is claimed to be also present in neighboring countries, even though it has been outlawed and carries a prison term under the laws of Ghana and neighboring countries.

In 2013, statistics on children's work have not changed much and according to the DOL's Findings on the Worst Forms of Child Labor in Ghana, the majority of working children engage in hazardous activities like pesticide spraying in the production of cocoa, fishing and gold mining. The Department's 2014 List of Goods Produced by Child Labor or Forced Labor includes fish and tilapia in particular, cocoa and gold as goods produced in such working conditions in Ghana.

=== Kenya ===
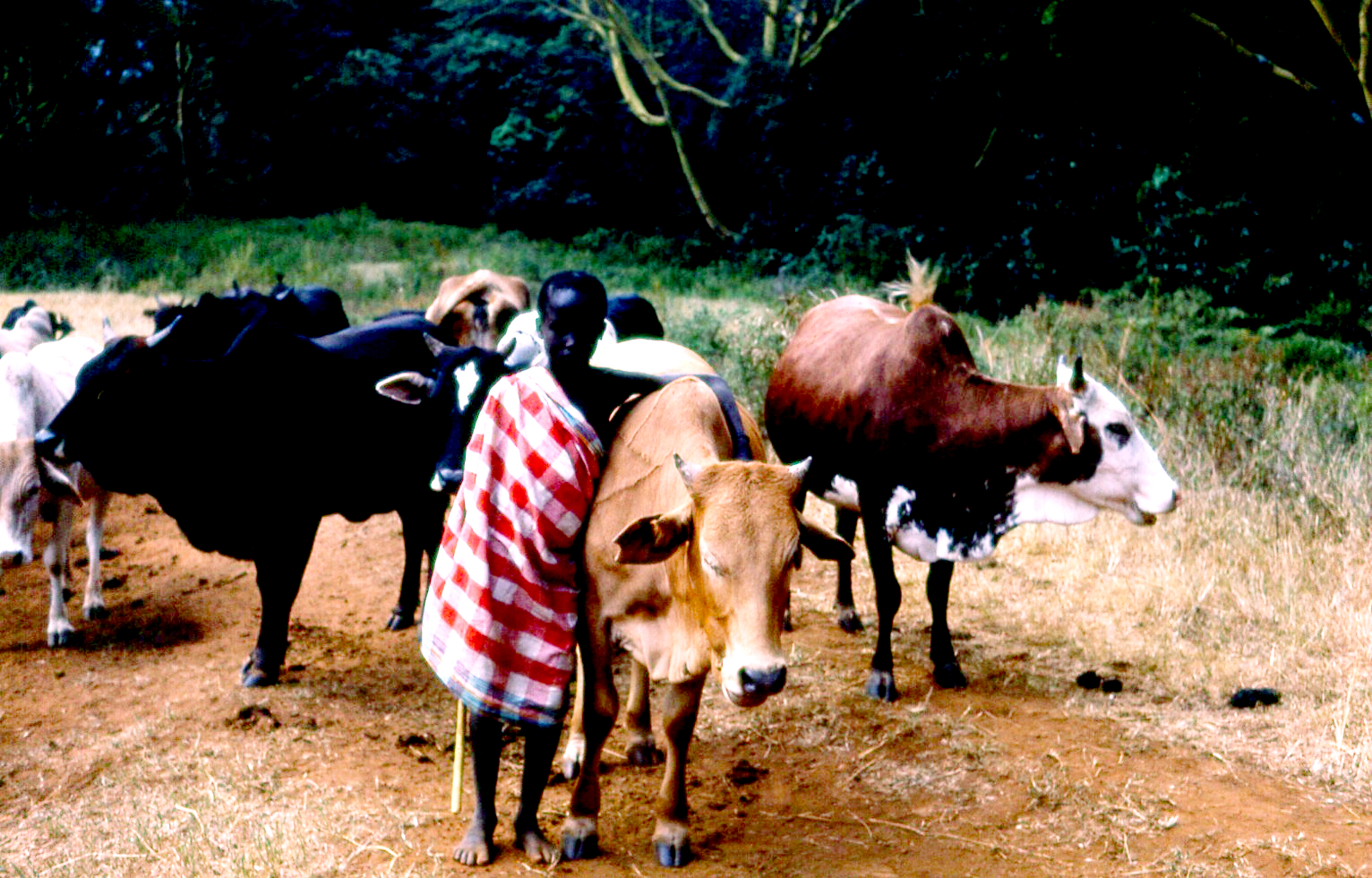
A child as a Maasai herder in Kenya

Suda, in 2001, estimated that Kenya had 3 million children working in intolerable conditions and who were visible. The number of invisible child workers, claims Suda, were much larger. The visible child labour in Kenya were engaged in agriculture, tourism industry, quarries and mines, pastoral labour, mining, garbage collection, fishing industry, and the transport sector where they move from place to place as "Matatu" touts.

The government of Kenya estimates there are 8.9 million children aged 5–13 who work, most of whom miss schooling. Agriculture is a major employer; of all labourers employed in coffee plantations, for example, 30% are people younger than age 27.

United Nations, in its country profile report for Kenya in 2009, estimated about one third of all children aged 5–14 were working. Agriculture and fishing were the largest employers, with former accounting for roughly 79% of child labour.

The United States Department of Labor estimated, in its 2010 report, about 32% of all Kenyan children aged 5–14 work, or over 2.9 million. Agriculture and fishing are the predominant employers. The informal sectors witnessing the worst form of child labour include sugarcane plantations, pastoral ranches, tea, coffee, miraa (a stimulant plant), rice, sisal, tobacco, tilapia and sardines fishing. Other economic activities of children in Kenya include scavenging dumpsites, collecting and selling scrap materials, glass and metal, street vending, herding and begging. Forced exploitation of children in sex tourism, the report claims, is prevalent in major cities such as Nairobi, Kisumu, Eldoret and coastal cities of Kenya.

Poverty and lack of schooling opportunities are major causes of child labour in Kenya. The country faces shortages of teachers and schools, overcrowding in schools, and procedural complications from children’s unregistered status. Kenyan law prevents access to schools to a child if he or she is unregistered as a citizen with Kenyan authorities. Currently, 44% of Kenyan children in rural areas remain unregistered. Thus, even when schools may be available, rural children are unable to prove citizenship, and these unregistered children risk losing the opportunity for schooling.

=== Madagascar ===
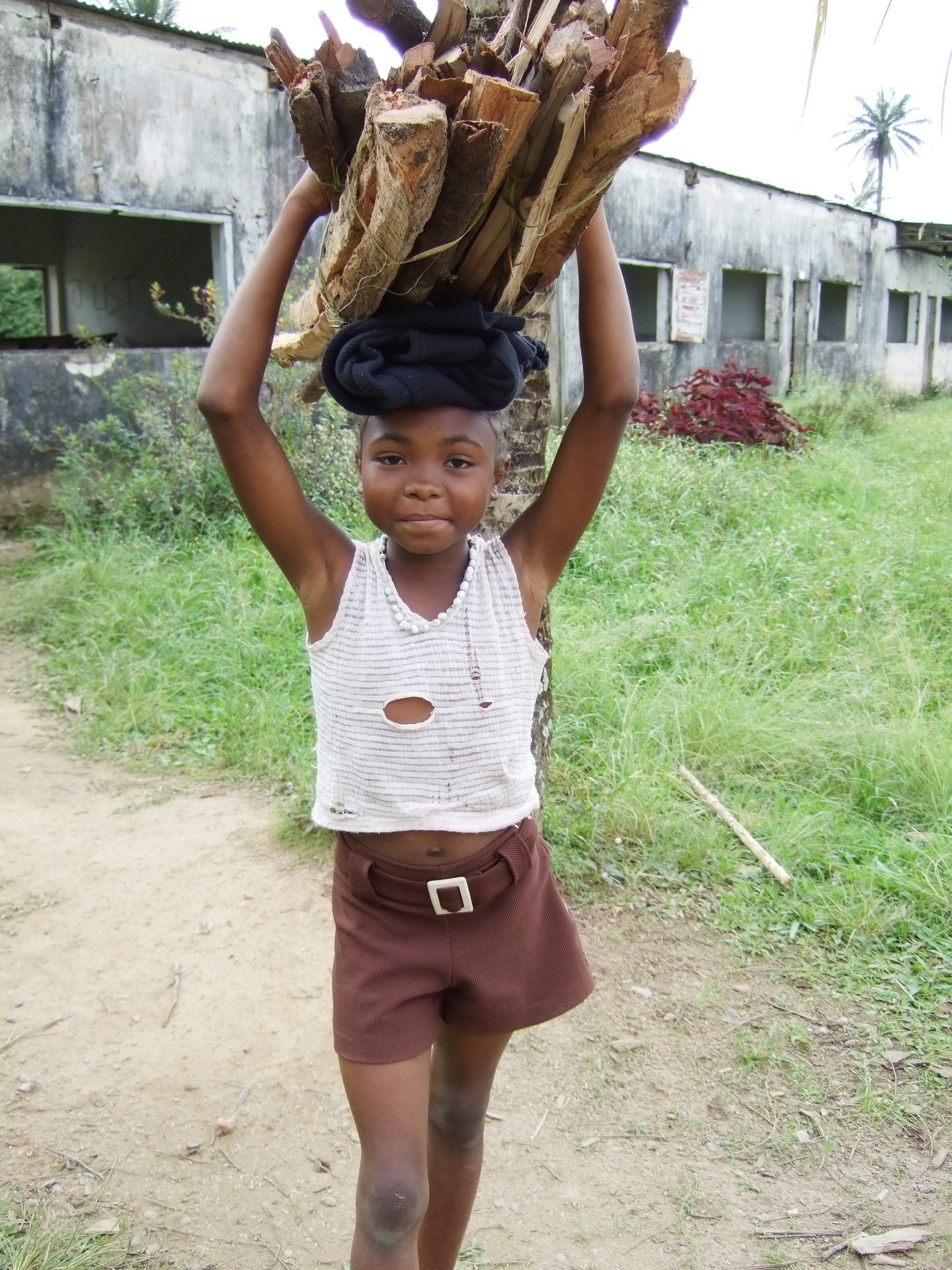
Child labour in Brickaville, a city in Atsinanana region of Madagascar

Children are common in small scale mines of Madagascar. Some are involved in salt mining, quarry work, gem and gold ore collection. About 58% of children in these mines are younger than age 12. According to IPEC, Child labourers in these mines usually come from families who are in precarious economic situation.

According to a United States-based 2010 report, about 22% of Madagascar children aged 5–14, or over 1.2 million work. Another French based group suggests Madagascar child labour exceeds 2.4 million, with over 540,000 children aged 5–9 working. About 87% of the child labour is in agriculture, mainly in the production of vanilla, tea, cotton, cocoa, copra (dried meat of coconut), sisal, shrimp harvest and fishing. Malagasy children engaged in domestic service work an average of 12 hours per day.

Several internationally funded efforts were involved in Madagascar to help reduce and prevent child labour. However these stopped, after the government change following 2009 coup, because much of the funding from international donors, including the African Union, European Union, World Bank and the United States, was suspended.

=== Morocco ===
A 2010 report estimates about 150,000 children aged between 5 and 14 were working in Morocco. Agriculture and domestic services are the predominant employers. Young girls, locally called as petites bonnes (little maids), are sent to work as live in domestic servants, many aged 10 or less. These petites bonnes come from very poor families, face conditions of involuntary servitude, including long hours without breaks, absence of holidays, physical, verbal and sexual abuse, withheld wages and even restrictions on their movement. They are denied education.

More visible forms of child labour includes street children in Casablanca, Marrakech, Fès and Mèknes. These children survive by selling cigarettes, begging, shining shoes, washing cars and working as porters and packers in ports.

The Ministry of Planning in Morocco estimates that there are between 60,000 and 100,000 petites bonnes in the country. Studies commissioned by the Morocco government finds poverty and lack of school, often in combination, are primary causes of the little maids phenomenon in Morocco. Additionally, rural parents do not believe that an education or a diploma of any sort can help their girls find a job.

=== Nigeria ===
In 2006, there were about 15 million child labourers younger than age 14 in Nigeria. Many of these worked in hazardous conditions and for long hours. Poverty was the main driver of child labour, and the income of these children was a major part of their impoverished families income. Vast majority of child labour in Nigeria worked in agriculture and semi-formal or informal economy. Domestic servants were the least visible form of child labour, and often sexually harassed. Amongst informal economy and public places, street vending employed 64%. Midst informal enterprises in semipublic places, children were often observed as mechanics and bus conductors.

About 6 million of Nigeria's children do not go to school at all. In the current conditions, these children do not have the time, energy or resources to go to school.

=== Rwanda ===
ILO estimates Rwanda has 400,000 child workers. Of these, 120,000 are thought to be involved in the worst forms of child labour and 60,000 are child domestic workers.

=== Swaziland ===
Child labour in Eswatini is a controversial issue that affects a large portion of the country's population. Child labour is often seen as a human rights concern because it is "work that deprives children of their childhood, their potential and their dignity, and that is harmful to physical and mental development," as defined by the International Labour Organization (ILO). Additionally, child labour is harmful in that it restricts a child's ability to attend school or receive an education. The ILO recognizes that not all forms of children working are harmful, but this article will focus on the type of child labour that is generally accepted as harmful to the child involved.

=== Tanzania ===
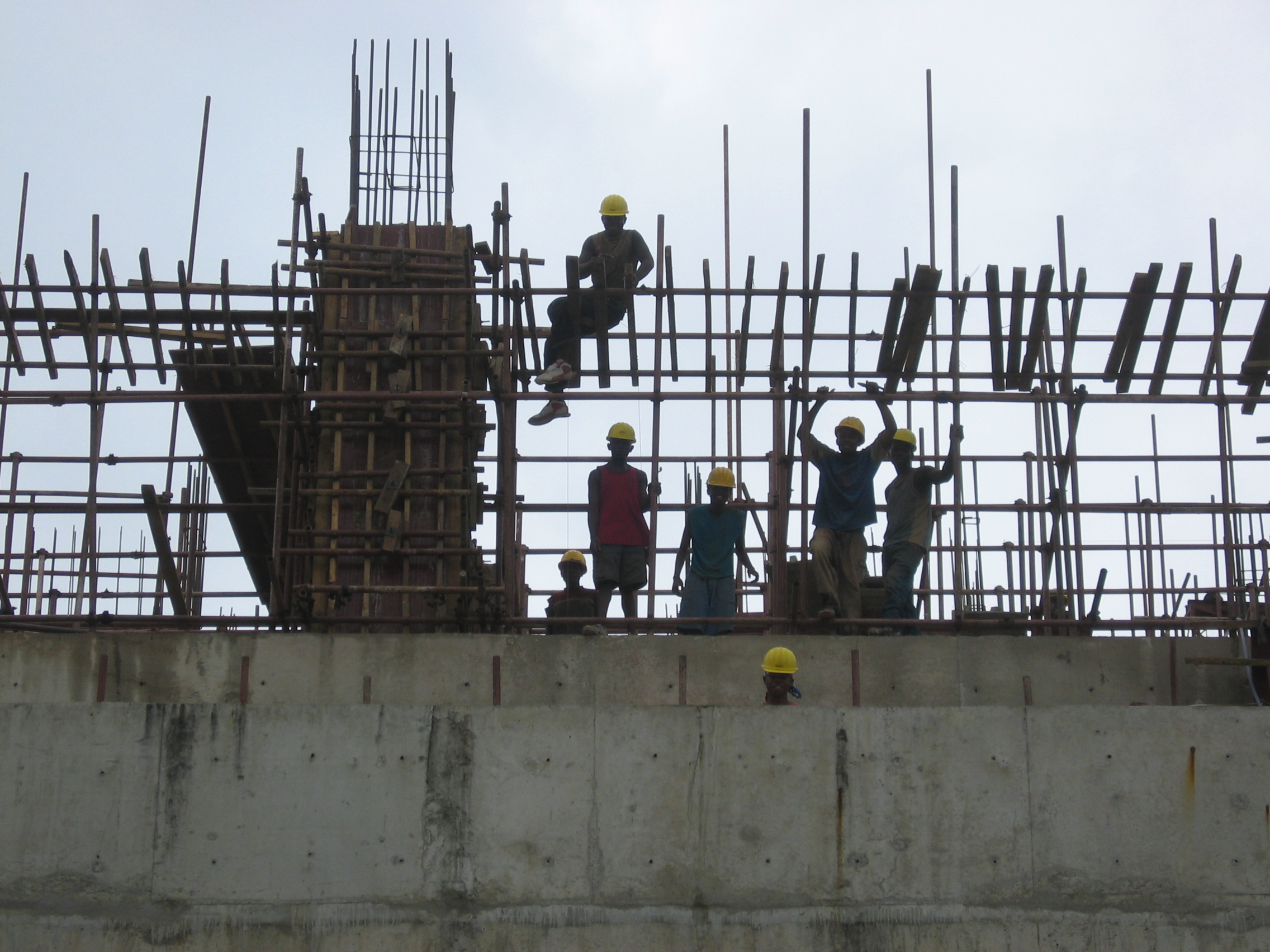
Children and teens working on a building yard in Dar Es Salaam, 2006

Child labour is common in Tanzania with millions working. It is more common with girls rather than boys. Girls are commonly employed as domestic servants, sometimes by force. Poor children in particular are trafficked internally for commercial sexual exploitation. Tanzania ratified the Convention on the Rights of the Child in 1991 and the African Charter on the Rights and Welfare of the Child in 2003. Tanzania then enacted the Law of the Child Act, 2009. To help implement that Act and provide a mechanism for the reporting of children's rights violations, a free-of-charge helpline is available throughout the country.

In 2013, the U.S. Department of Labor reported in its Findings on the Worst Forms of Child Labor study that 25% of children aged 5 to 14 are working children. This percentage corresponds to around 3.1 million children. According to the report, despite the Government's moderate advancement in eliminating child labor, children in Tanzania still engage in agricultural and mining activities as indentured labourers. In December 2014, an ILAB List of Goods Produced by Child Labor or Forced Labor reported 8 goods produced in such working conditions in Tanzania, 6 of them are agricultural goods (most importantly coffee, sisal, tea and tobacco). The remaining items are gold and tanzanite.

=== Zambia ===
The government of Zambia estimated there were some 595,000 child workers in the country. Of these, 58% were aged 14 or less. Many were employed in informal mining operations.

The United States Department of Labor estimated, in its 2010 report, about 33% of Zambian children aged 5–14 work. Agriculture is the dominant employer, and with mining employs 98% of all child labour in Zambia. The informal sectors witnessing the worst form of child labour include cotton plantations, tobacco, fishing, tea, coffee and charcoal. Child labour is common in mining. However, this is witnessed in small artisanal and traditional mines, where the children extract emeralds, amethyst, aquamarines, tourmalines and garnets. Child labour is also present in mines of lead, zinc and copper ores. They do not wear any protective equipment to protect their eyes or face or body; injuries are common.

Child trafficking for purposes of hazardous labour is prevalent in Zambia. Children in agriculture and domestic service are exchanged for money, goods and gifts to family members. Zambia has strict laws against trafficking and child labour. However, implementation and enforcement of its laws has proven to be difficult.

According to ILO, child labour in Zambia is a coping strategy for the children and families when adult breadwinners die, fall ill, or when families are simply unable to make ends meet.

== Dynamics ==
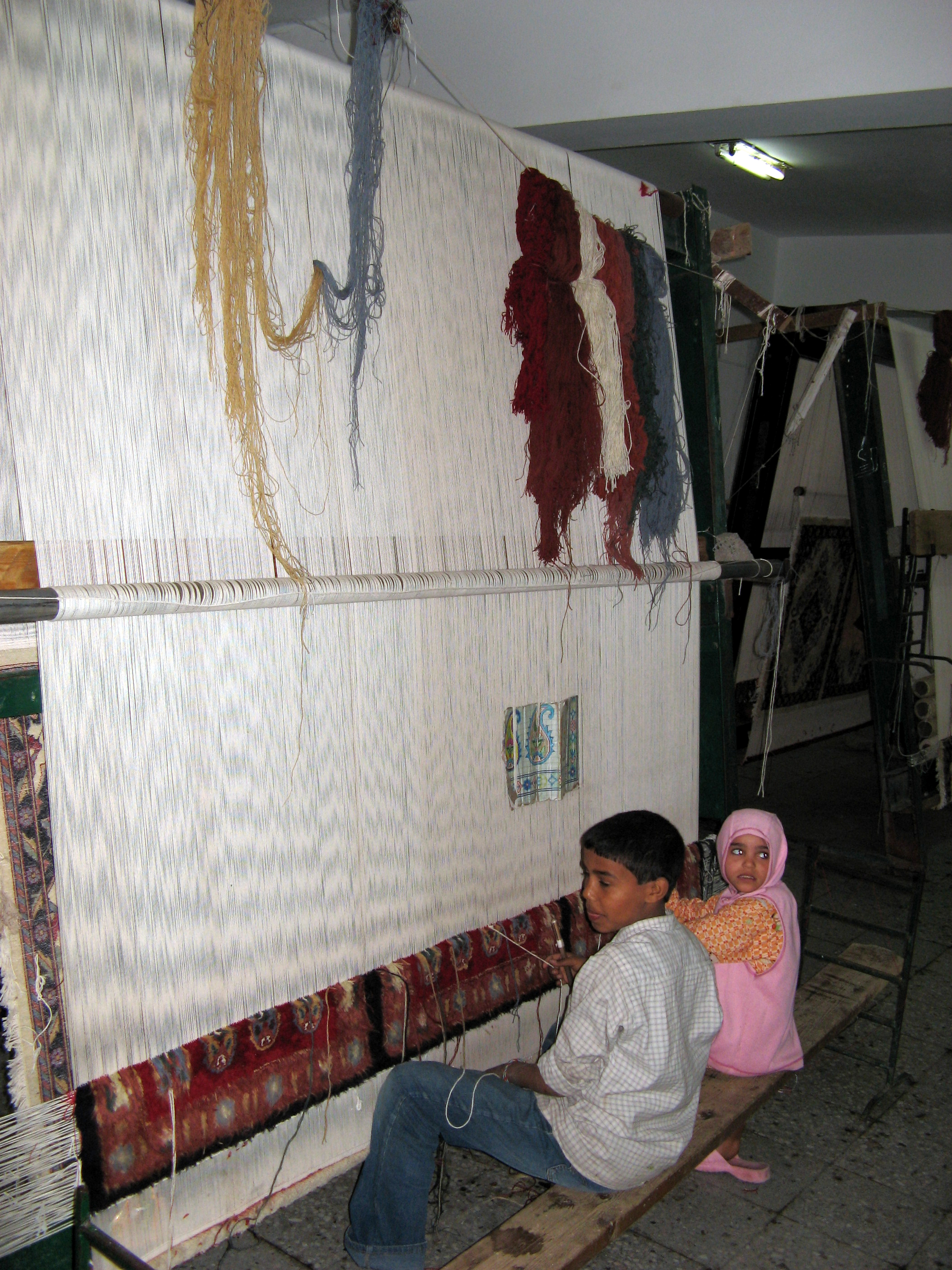
Home-based carpet weaving enterprise in Egypt deploying child labour

International Labor Organization (ILO) stated that first of all, poverty is the greatest single force driving children into the workplace. Another major factor driving children to harmful labor is the lack of schools and poor quality of schooling.

=== Child labour laws in Africa ===
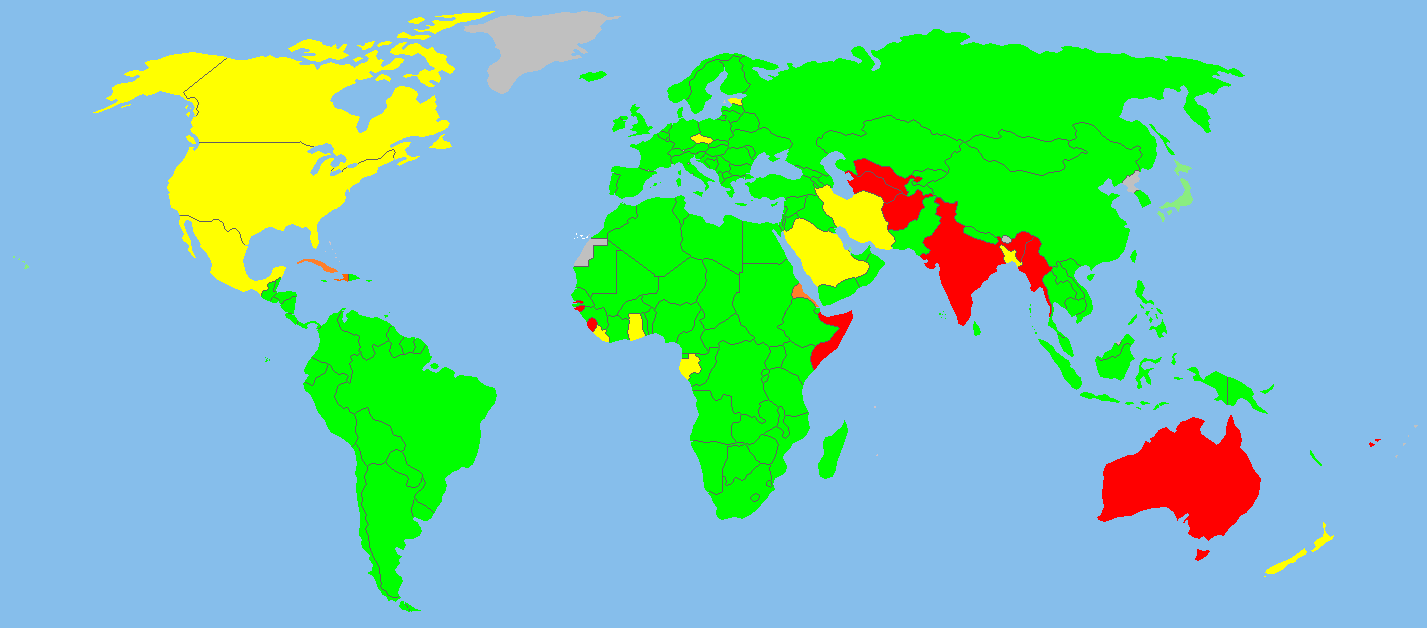
Most African nations have ratified worldwide child labour-related conventions. African countries coloured in green had national laws, as of 2006, equivalent to ILO Conventions 138 and 182. Additional countries, except South Sudan and Somalia, to have ratified ILO Conventions since then.

Most African governments have formally adopted the three International Labour Organization (ILO) Conventions. In addition, many have signed a memorandum of understanding with ILO to launch a programme under the International Programme for the Elimination of Child Labour (IPEC).

Nigeria, for example, is now an active member of IPEC. It is also implementing the West Africa Cocoa Agriculture Project. Nigeria's Child Rights Act is now part of its Labour Act, and it prohibits exploitative labour from children. Some states, like Anambra, have also banned children from working during school hours.

South Africa has made it a criminal offence to employ a child under the age of 15, except with a permit from the Department of Labour to employ children in the performing arts. Sections 43 through 47 of its Employment Act also makes it illegal to employ children aged 15 to 18 if the work is inappropriate for their age or something that places them at risk.

Kenya passed a Children's Act in 2001. Section 10 of this Act protects children and youth below age 18 from economic exploitation and any work that is likely to be hazardous or to interfere with the child's education, or to be harmful to the child spiritual, moral or social development. The law also forbids hiring anyone less than the age of 18 for military or in any armed conflict.

Ghana, as another example, forbids child labour. Section 87 of its Children's Act 1998 forbids any person from employing a child in exploitative labour, or in any engagement that deprives the child of its health, education or development. Section 88 prohibits anyone from employing any child at night, that is between the hours of eight o'clock in the evening and six o'clock in the morning. The Act's section 89 to 90 allow children above the age of 13 to engage in light work, and those aged over 15 non-hazardous work. In 2018 only three individuals were fined in Ghana for employing children under the legal age and depriving them of their right to education and no employer has served a prison sentence so far, thereby illustrating that law enforcement is limited in Ghana.

While substantial legislation is now in place in almost all of Africa, legal enforcement remains a challenge. Due to a lack of government intervention, these child labor rates continue to increase. 14.2% of children additionally work under know hazardous conditions since over three years. A lack of consequences for employers, has resulted in children choosing to remain employed out of fear of violence and/or need to provide for their families forces them to remain employed.

=== Non-governmental organizations ===
ILO has a number of projects in Africa that seek to reduce, and ultimately eliminate child labour in Africa. One such project, launched in 2006 is focussed on west African nations of Benin, Burkina Faso, Cape Verde, Ivory Coast, Gambia, Ghana, Guinea, Guinea-Bissau, Liberia, Mali, Niger, Nigeria, Senegal, Sierra Leone, and Togo. This project, started in 2009, aims at worst forms of child labour in west Africa. It has two main components: the first will support national efforts to eliminate the worst forms of child labour, while the second aims at mobilizing sub-regional policy makers and improving sub-regional cooperation for the elimination of the worst forms of child labour among all fifteen member States of the Economic Community of West African States (ECOWAS).

KURET project, which is an acronym for Combating Exploitive Child Labor Through Education in Kenya, Uganda, Rwanda, and Ethiopia Together, is a regional effort to prevent exploitive child labor through education. Funded by the United States Department of Labor and implemented by World Vision, the Academy for Educational Development, and the International Rescue Committee, KURET began in September 2004. The regional office is located in Kampala, Uganda. A report in 2009 claims it made a difference in the lives of thousands of children in this region of Africa.

Patriots Ghana is another non-governmental organization which is located in Ghana. The organization's vision is a nation full of empowered patriots contributing to Ghana's development. The organization focuses on achieving development through a variety of local actions. Their mission is to empower Ghanaian citizens to undertake meaningful projects regarding eliminating child trafficking and labor, health, education, human rights, and economic development, to improve the lives of the less privileged Ghanaian citizens. Patriots Ghana therefore aims to achieve their mission through a rights-based approach which is reflected in their activities. The organization emphasizes a need for a rights-based approach due to the consequences of rapid population growth in Ghana, which results from a lack of health care for the poor. Having to supply for a large family has led to long-term financial instability, especially in rural regions. Because of the need to provide for their families, children are often deprived of their right to education and have to work. To eliminate a long-term poverty spiral, the organization focuses on actions which empower communities to reestablishing human rights by reducing child labor in Ghana.

== See also ==
- Child labour in Botswana
- Child labour in Lesotho
- Child labour in Namibia
- Child labour in Swaziland
- Children in cocoa production
- Child Labour Programme of Action (South Africa)
- International Programme on the Elimination of Child Labour, IPEC
- International Research on Working Children

South Asia:

- Child labour in Bangladesh
- Child labour in India

General:

- Slavery in contemporary Africa
- Child labour
- Child slavery
- Child soldiers
