= Towards the Elimination of the worst forms of Child Labour =

The programme Towards the Elimination of the worst forms of Child Labour (TECL) is a programme on child labour and related issues that is run in all the countries of the Southern African Customs Union (SACU), namely Botswana, Lesotho, Namibia, South Africa and Swaziland.

Funding for the TECL programme was sourced by the International Programme on the Elimination of Child Labour (IPEC) of the International Labour Organization (ILO), from the US Department of Labor. The first phase of the programme (referred to as TECL I) ran from 2004 to June 2008. The second phase (TECL II) started in March 2009 and ran for three years.

== South Africa ==
In South Africa the TECL I was essentially an executing agency for key elements of the national Child Labour Programme of Action, as partner to relevant government Departments, and in collaboration with organised employers, organised labour and NGOs.

TECL II involves more limited programme activities with a limited set of government departments and other stakeholder.

=== Pilot projects ===
Key projects of TECL I in South Africa were four sets of pilot projects aimed at addressing work-related activities of children that are likely to affect their development detrimentally.

The pilot projects address the following three issues or groups of issues, one of which is addressed in this report:

- Commercial sexual exploitation of children (CSEC), Child trafficking and educational rehabilitation of children found in Worst Forms of Child Labour (WFCL).
- Children Used By Adults in the Commission of crime (CUBAC).
- Delivery of water to households far from sources of safe water. By delivering water to such households, the extremely long periods spent by some children in collecting water could be reduced, thereby making more time available for schooling and other activities. It should also reduce the hazards they are exposed to.

The implementation of these pilot projects commenced in late 2005, and they were all concluded in 2007 or 2008.

=== Other projects ===
Education policy and child labour

Researching child labour in commercial agriculture

== BLNS Countries: Formulating Action Programmes on the Elimination of Child labour ==
Recent studies have shown that Botswana, Lesotho, Namibia and Swaziland (referred to as the BLNS Countries) all have cases of child labour, although the nature and incidence differ between the countries. See in this regard:

- Child labour in Botswana
- Child labour in Lesotho
- Child labour in Namibia
- Child labour in Swaziland.

All these countries have ratified the Worst Forms of Child Labour Convention, 1999, which identifies worst forms of child labour, including the commercial sexual exploitation of children, forced labour, children used by adults in the commission of crime, child trafficking and other forms of very hazardous work. The Convention requires of states that ratify the convention to take immediate ‘time-bound measures’ to secure the prohibition and elimination of the worst forms of child labour.

The countries have some policies and programmes in place to help eliminate child labour, but none of them as yet have comprehensive strategies to address these issues specifically.

In 2006-2008 the BLNS countries plan to put in place national Action Programmes on the Elimination of Child Labour (APECs). The process is expected to involve extensive consultation with stakeholders at national level and also in the regions or districts, and is described in more detail below. It is led by the various Ministries responsible for labour and is assisted by the programme Towards the Elimination of the worst forms of Child Labour (TECL).

Programme Advisory Committees on Child Labour, representing government departments, organised labour and business, and civil society guide the development and implementation of the programme.

=== Analysing existing policies ===
The second phase of the programme will involve the publication of a discussion document on child labour in these countries. It will consolidate information available on child labour in these countries and include an analysis of existing policy and identification of any possible policy gaps.

=== Consulting stakeholders ===
The discussion document will form the basis of a detailed consultation process, the third phase of the programme. This will be on what action steps should be put in place in a concerted effort to eliminate child labour, focusing on worst forms of child labour.

After having obtained input on suggested actions that should be taken, these proposals will be negotiated directly with the suggested implementing department. The aim will be to draw up a list of actions that will be taken, which implementing agencies have agreed to.

=== Adopting APECs ===
All these activities culminated in early 2008 in the national endorsement of Action Programmes on the Elimination of Child Labour (APEC) in Botswana, Namibia and Swaziland. Although endorsed by national forums of stakeholders, including representatives of key government ministries, these programmes are expected to be tabled at cabinet level during 2008.

Adoption of the Lesotho APEC is also expected during 2008. Implementation of the action programmes will follow their adoption.

== See also ==
- International Labour Organization
- Commercial sexual exploitation of children
