= Child Labour Programme of Action =

National programmes against child labour

A Child Labour Programme of Action, sometimes called a Child Labour Action Programme or Action Programme on the Elimination of Child Labour (APEC) is a national programme aimed at addressing child labour within a given country. It includes, but is not restricted to, the Worst Forms of Child Labour.

The following countries have adopted, or plan to adopt, such a programme:

- Botswana
- Lesotho
- Namibia
- Swaziland
