= Child Labour Programme of Action (South Africa) =

National plan on elimination of child labour

The Child Labour Programme of Action (or CLPA) is the national plan on elimination of child labour in South Africa. It was provisionally adopted by a large group of key stakeholders in September 2003. These stakeholders include key government departments, including those responsible for labour, provincial and local government, water service, justice, policing, prosecution, social development, and education. The lead department is the Department of Labour. It was previously known as the Child Labour Action Programme, but was renamed in February 2006 because of the negative connotation attached to the abbreviation CLAP.

The first phase was from 2004 to March 2008 and referred to as the CLPA-1.

Many departments and other stakeholders have been implementing aspects of the Child Labour Programme of Action since 2004. However, the Minister of Labour plans to submit it for formal cabinet approval only once a costing study has been done. This study aims at calculating the additional cost to government of key elements of this programme.

In September 2007 key stakeholders adopted the national plan for the second five-year-phase of implementation, April 2008 to March 2013. This is referred to as CLPA-2.

The programme Towards the Elimination of the worst forms of Child Labour (TECL) was, regarding its activities in South Africa during its first phase (2004–2008), essentially an executing agency for key elements of the Child Labour Programme of Action.

== Background ==
The South African Constitution provides that children under 18 have a right to be protected from work that is exploitative, hazardous, inappropriate for their age, detrimental to their schooling, or detrimental to their social, physical, mental, spiritual, or moral development. The term 'work' is not limited to work in economic activities (e.g. paid employment) but includes chores or household activities in the child's household (such as collecting wood and fuel), where such work is exploitative, hazardous, inappropriate for their age, or detrimental to their development. The term 'child labour' as used in the Child Labour Programme of Action covers all these forms of child work.

The labour department estimates that there were about one million of South Africa's children who are working as child labourers.

South Africa has ratified the ILO Minimum Age Convention, 1973 (C138). This Convention requires ratifying states to pursue a national policy designed to ensure the effective abolition of child labour and to progressively raise the minimum age for admission to employment or work. South Africa also assisted in drafting the Worst Forms of Child Labour Convention, 1999 (C182), which it ratified in 2000. In terms of this convention South Africa must take time-bound measures to eliminate the worst forms of child labour (WFCL). These include forms of bonded labour, commercial sexual exploitation of children, trafficking of children, and the use of children by others in illegal activities, including drug trafficking.

Since 1996 the Government of South Africa has been involved in a process towards the formulation of appropriate policies and a national action programme to combat child labour. The Department of Labour is the lead department in the process.

The South African Government has a wide range of existing programmes that are directly and indirectly improving the situation of children. Many are aimed at addressing poverty, for example, the public works programmes, the provision of basic infrastructure, access to basic services and the roll out of social grants that benefit children. The programmes are funded for the most part from the government budget. The Child Labour Programme of Action is intended to complement and strengthen the existing programmes where they are not adequately preventing child labour.

The first step in the development of the South African programme was the establishment of a reliable and credible database on child work in the country. In 1999, Statistics South Africa conducted the first national household-based survey of child work in South Africa, the Survey of Activities of Young People (SAYP).

In addition to the SAYP, as part of the development of the Child Labour programme of Action, all known qualitative research conducted within South Africa on areas relevant to this policy was reviewed. This review was used, in particular, to inform those elements of the policy that deal with forms of work and employment that survey methodologies cannot address and was published as Discussion document towards a National Child Labour Action Programme.

The SAYP and review of qualitative research confirmed that South Africa does not seem to have as serious a problem in regard to child labour as some other countries. In particular, the extent of child labour in the formal sectors of the economy is limited. However, the SAYP also confirmed that there indeed are children in the country who are doing unacceptable amounts of work, or work of an unacceptable nature. South Africa clearly needs to address these if it is to fulfill its commitment in terms of the Constitution and international conventions. Addressing the problems sooner rather than later should also help to avoid their multiplying and becoming more serious and difficult to address in the future.

== National consultations that led towards the Child Labour Programme of Action ==
Following the process of gathering information, the Government of South Africa began formulating appropriate policies and a national action programme to combat child labour. This was done through a process of extensive consultation with the South African public and engagement with key stakeholders. Stakeholders consulted included government departments, organised labour, organised business and relevant non-governmental organisations (NGOs). The consultation process included focus groups with affected children, who were asked about their experiences and subsequently asked for their opinion on proposed policy measures aimed at addressing their specific circumstances. Exercises were also conducted with children in grade seven in schools throughout the country.

The consultative process has culminated in the drafting of a national CLAP for South Africa. The process of developing the Child Labour Programme of Action was overseen and guided by an inter-sectoral National Steering Committee involving key departments, employers' and workers organisations, NGOs and the community constituency of South Africa's NEDLAC (National Economic Development & Labour Council). The National Steering Committee was coordinated and chaired by the Department of Labour.

== Guiding principles ==
The following principles were applied in the drafting of the Child Labour Programme of Action:

- Need for prioritisation: Because of limited resources the programme identified the forms of child work that should be prioritised. These were identified primarily on the basis of the number of children involved and the degree of harm of particular forms of work. The country also needed to take action first, and urgently, on the worst forms of child labour identified in the convention.
- Learn from others where appropriate: South Africa has developed an indigenous programme that suits the local context, but has borrowed, where appropriate, best practices from other countries. It has also learnt from the mistakes of others.
- The programme of action must be as realistic as possible, and take into account existing financial and human capacity and the extent to which capacity can be further developed within the time and resources available.
- The programme must be sustainable. To achieve sustainability, it must be able to be funded from government funds after a possible initial injection of donor funds which the International Labour Organisation (ILO) has undertaken to help government access to assist with once-off expenditures that can kick-start ongoing, sustainable activities.
- The programme must build on and fit in with existing programmes of government.

The Child Labour Programme of Action identifies a wide range of activities falling within the mandates of a wide range of government departments and agencies. For each activity, the programme identifies the lead department as well as other departments and agencies, including non-governmental agencies, which would be involved. The views of the government agencies involved were canvassed during the formulation of the programme, and modifications introduced where necessary. Treasury's budget officers were also consulted to ensure that the proposals would mesh with budgetary plans.

The majority of the activities making up the Child Labour Programme of Action already forms part of government policy. In these cases the programme confirms that these activities contribute to addressing child labour. Where appropriate, it proposes that implementation be strengthened. In some cases, the programme suggests a variation of an existing programme or policy which will allow it to combat child labour more effectively. Neither of the above two types of proposals will involve significant expenditure or other resources from government.

In a few cases, the Child Labour Programme of Action proposes new activities, some of which will necessitate new expenditures. These are clearly identified in the programme document. For each activity – whether existing, a variation of existing, or new – the programme identifies whether once-off and ongoing costs will be minimal, moderate or significant. The Department of Labour will undertake a costing exercise regarding at least those items identified as being moderately or significantly costly.

== Key elements ==
- Targeting the rollout of government and other stakeholders' programmes and policies on poverty, employment, labour and social matters more effectively in areas where the work that children do has serious negative effects on them;
- Promoting new legislative measure against worst forms of child labour;
- Strengthening of national capacity to enforce legislative measures;
- Increasing public awareness and social mobilisation against the worst forms of child labour.

Large-scale projects with significant financial demands and substantial human resource requirements have been avoided since they will not be realistic or sustainable. In a few cases, however, action steps have been included which may have significant cost implications. The most important of these is the proposed extension of the qualifying age for the Child Support Grant by 2006 from 13 years to the end of the school year the child turns 15 so as to avoid the current contradiction with the Basic Conditions of Employment Act prohibiting child work below that age, as well as the provisions on compulsory schooling. The programme also proposes a further roll out of the child support grant up to the age of 17 by 2008. This will encourage children to remain in school and so help to avoid children's engagement in hazardous works activities and other WFCL.

== See also ==
The Child Labour Programme of Action is called an Action Programme on the Elimination of Child Labour in the BLNS Countries.

== Links to documents ==
The Child Labour Programme of Action document
