= National Action Plan on the Elimination of Child Labour =

A National Action Plan on the elimination of child labour (or NAP) is a national strategy, plan or programme aimed at addressing child labour within a given country, usually with an emphasis on worst forms of child labour. Some countries also refer to this as an Action Programme on the Elimination of Child Labour (APEC).

The following countries have adopted, or plan to adopt, such a programme:

- Botswana: the National Action Programme towards the Elimination of Child Labour in Botswana was nationally endorsed in February 2008;
- Lesotho;
- Namibia: the Action Programme on the Elimination of Child Labour in Namibia was nationally endorsed in January 2008;
- South Africa: the first Child Labour Programme of Action (CLPA) was adopted in 2003; and the phase two CLPA (or CLPA-2), for implementation from 2008 to 2012, in September 2007;
- Swaziland: Child Labour, the Strategy and Action Programme on the Elimination of Child Labour was nationally endorsed on 1 April 2008.
