= Pilot Project on Children used by adults in the commission of crime =

Pilot project

The South African Child Labour Programme of Action has identified Children used by adults in the commission of crime (CUBAC), one of the Worst Forms of Child Labour, as a priority area for action on child labour in South Africa.

Accordingly the Programme Towards the Elimination of the worst forms of Child Labour (TECL), a programme to kickstart action on the Child Labour Programme of Action, commissioned the Children’s Rights Project of the Community Law Centre, University of the Western Cape, to do research and design pilot projects with a focus on CUBAC. The purpose of the overall project is to investigate the phenomenon, to design and run pilot projects, and to develop and implement policy to combat the use of children by others in the commission of crimes.

This project is run in the stages listed in the table of contents.

This project is currently in Stage 1: research and design.

== Stage 1: Research and design ==
The research and design stage of this pilot includes three processes:

- Environmental scan of stakeholders, policies and literature on the relevant pilot project focus area, including: (a) a report on stakeholder consultations and analysis; (b) a literature survey, including analysis of relevant quantitative surveys and qualitative research; (c) recommended sites for possible implementation of the project, where a baseline study is then conducted; and (d) initial suggestions on how the project could be implemented.
- Baseline study: A baseline study is conducted within each of the selected candidate sites, to inform the final choice of sites and to assist with the design of the pilot.
- Project design for pilots in each selected sites.

The environmental scan was aimed at identifying the prevalence, location and nature of offences where children are used by others to commit crime in order to provide a credible basis for initiating the work in phase two, which will centre on more in-depth research around programme design and situational analysis in 4 potential pilot sites.

== Stage 2: Implementation of the pilot project ==
The pilot project was run in two of the sites where the baseline study was conducted, in Mitchell's Plain in the Western Cape, and in mamelodi in Gauteng, from late 2005 until April 2007.

== Stage 3: Development and implementation of policy ==
Policy will be developed during the pilot design and implementation stages. During the third stage a process through which the main implementing agencies, such as relevant government departments, will consider and possibly adopt key recommendations, operationalise measures, including budgeting for them. During this stage the pilot projects will be closed, or handed to government departments, agencies or NGOs.

== Participating institutions ==
The following institutions are involved in the project:

- Department of Labour, acting as the lead department of the Child Labour Programme of Action;
- Department of Correctional Services
- Department of Justice and Constitutional Development;
- Department of Social Development;
- National Prosecuting Authority.
