= Survey of Activities of Young People =

The Survey of Activities of Young People (SAYP) is a national household-based survey of work-related activities among South African children, conducted for the first time in 1999 by Statistics South Africa.

== History ==
The official results were released in October 2002, and provides a national, quantitative picture. It also gives an indication of the different categories of working children who are most in need or who are at the greatest risk of exploitation in work and employment.

The survey constituted the first step in the development of the South African Child Labour Programme of Action which was provisionally adopted in September 2003.

A household-based survey cannot pick up some of the worst forms of child labour — for this reason, qualitative research projects are undertaken or planned by the "Towards the Elimination of the worst forms of Child Labour" (TECL) Programme.
