= Child labour in the diamond industry =

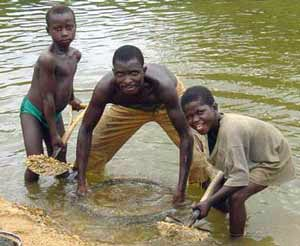
A man and two children sifting for diamonds in Sierra Leone in 2004.

Child labour in the diamond industry is a widely reported and criticized issue on diamond industry for using child labour in diamond mines and polishing procedures in poor conditions mainly in India and African countries. The largest producers of diamonds in Africa in terms of volume are Botswana, Angola, and the Democratic Republic of the Congo, with other countries producing significant amounts of diamonds as well. In these mines, children come into contact with minerals, oil and machinery exhaust. In many of these countries, the lack of mining and labour regulations is considered a result of early colonisation. In 1997, The International Confederation of Free Trade Unions claimed that child labour was prospering in the diamond industry in Western India, where the majority of the world's diamonds are cut and polished while workers are often paid only a fraction of 1% of the value of the stones they cut. It is argued that economic growth in Western India in the 1980s–90s was associated with an increase in the number of child workers who do simple, repetitive manual tasks that do not require long years of training or experience in low-paying, hazardous working conditions that involve drudgery, negative impact on health, and foreclose the option of school education for most of them.

There are organisations and people who try to create public awareness about the issue, including the Anti-Slavery Society, Survival International, IndianNGO, Child Labour News Service (CLNS) managed by the Global March Against Child Labour, and IHS Child Slave Labour News.

The United Nations declared 2021 as the International Year for the Elimination of Child Labour.

== History of the diamond industry in India and Africa ==
=== India ===
According to historical records, diamonds were first discovered in India, with indirect evidence of diamond products dating back to around 100 C.E. The diamond trade was detailed in many writings by traders from the 13th to 17th centuries, including Marco Polo. After this period, the English and Dutch East India Companies controlled a majority of the diamond and precious stone industry. Colonial gem mining and processing groups turned the focus from mining to processing gems to make jewellery. Processing diamonds to make jewellery remains a major sector of the diamond and gem industry in India today. After gaining independence in the mid-20th century, the Indian government implemented the National Diamond Project in the 1980s to evaluate the potential for diamond mining. The following decades included the implementation of the National Mineral Policy and subsequent amendments, which were aimed at growing the private mining sector.

=== Southern Africa ===
The diamond industry in Africa began to boom in the late 19th century, specifically in Southern Africa when diamonds were first discovered here in 1867. A total of 8408 British companies registered for mining rights in this region in a period from 1880 to 1913. Diamond mining and the railroads that sprang up as a result led to rapid economic growth in the Cape, but this growth was confined to the mining sector and ultimately went back to the British Empire, rather than the local population. Other economic sectors were harmed, as colonial policies stripped farmers’ rights away from their land to access minerals below their farmland.

South Africa was the first country in this region to gain independence, which led to the birth of the Union of South Africa in 1910. In 1927, the Precious Stones Act was enacted to regulate the prospecting and mining of diamonds, as well as to determine who had rights to the diamonds. Despite gaining independence, Britain still retained the rights to some land in South Africa. This “Crown Land” allowed the Crown to maintain a majority share of the diamonds found on this land. This law remained until it was repealed in 1964 with the Precious Stones Act, enacted by the now Republic of South Africa. This new law did not reserve rights to precious minerals to the Crown; instead, the state maintained the mining rights and disposed of these minerals. Any private citizen who wished to mine had to obtain the proper licensing. The Precious Stones Act was repealed in 1991 with the newly enacted Minerals Act. The state was no longer entitled to a share in newly discovered diamonds in most cases, and prospecting and mining rights were determined by who owned said land. The Minerals Act lasted just over a decade until the Mineral and Petroleum Resources Development Act (MPRDA) came into effect in 2004. Still in effect today, its purpose is to separate land ownership from the rights to diamonds, given how Apartheid South Africa created land inequality between the white and black populations. A private citizen will need to obtain mining or prospecting rights to minerals regardless of land ownership.

The impacts of colonialism on the diamond industry persisted after the independence of South Africa in the form of the Apartheid government, which relied on cheap labour and revenue from the mining sector; the mining industry was largely supported by the De Beers company, which maintained influence all over Southern Africa. Even after the 1994 election, which marked the end of Apartheid, economic restructuring was slow. Most of the mines were owned by white South Africans, while the labourers were mostly black.

=== Western Africa ===
Unlike southern Africa, diamonds were discovered in the western area of Africa much later, in the early 20th century. However, extraction at a large scale did not begin until after WWII. In the few decades after, the industry was well maintained and organised in countries like Sierra Leone, Liberia, Guinea, and Côte d'Ivoire. However, subsequent decades saw a sharp decrease in production as mineral reserves began to run dry, and political instability in the region led to more criminal trading. For example, Sierra Leone, which at its peak was exporting 2 million carats per year, saw that number fall to just 50 thousand in under a decade due to foreign mafia influence and corrupt leaders like Siaka Stevens. Armed conflicts between Liberia and Sierra Leone in the early 21st century also allowed for illegal miners and traders to supply the black market with diamonds. Armed conflicts keep these countries politically and economically unstable, and black-market diamonds do not contribute to the country's economy. These factors limit economic development and keep miners in poverty, forcing them to continue working in the mines.

== Reports ==
=== India ===
In 1997, the International Labour Organization published a report titled Child Labour in the Diamond Industry claiming that child labour is highly prevalent in the Indian diamond industry. Child labourers constitute nearly 3% of the total workforce, and the percentage of child labourers is as high as 25% in the diamond industry of Surat. The ICFTU further claimed that child labour was prospering in the diamond industry in western India, where the majority of the world's diamonds are cut and polished. Workers are often paid only a fraction of 1% of the value of the stones they cut.

Pravin Nanavati, a Surat-based diamond businessman argued that, since high cost diamonds could easily be lost or broken while cutting or polishing, employing a child labourer would mean risking "lakhs of rupees." Some western countries have called for a boycott against the diamond industry for establishing a monopoly in the sector. Mohan Dhabuwala, secretary of The South Gujarat Diamond Workers Association, argued that while child labour is highly prevalent in the construction and hotel industries, there are few child labourers in the diamond industry of Surat, less than 1% according to their surveys, mainly because of stern punishments and penalties for violation of child labour laws.

In 1998, Madhura Swaminathan from the Indira Gandhi Institute of Development Research argued that economic growth in western India had been associated with an increase in the number of child workers over the previous 15 years and that children worked at simple repetitive manual tasks in low-paying hazardous jobs, foreclosing the option of school education.

In 2005, an India-based management consultancy firm, A. F. Ferguson & Co., commissioned a study titled Child Labour from the Gem and Jewellery Industry "to spread awareness about child labour among the people connected with the industry". They studied 663 manufacturing units at 21 different locations in Gujarat, Maharashtra, Rajasthan, West Bengal and Tamil Nadu, as an initiative of the Gem & Jewelry Export Promotion Council. On 12 February, the study was presented at a seminar held by the GJEPC and the Surat Diamond Association, in Surat, India. The report argued that the use of child labour in India's diamond processing industry has been reduced from 0.55% in 1998 to 0.31% in 2005, "while for the synthetic stone industry it is estimated to be two-thirds less".

GJEPC chairman Bakul Mehta claimed that, "some 500 diamond factory owners took an oath in the city of Palanpur, Gujarat, (home town of leading Gujarati diamond merchants) not to employ children in their factories. Similarly, in Surat, 200 factory owners took the oath," and that GJEPC "remain committed to eradicating child labour from the Indian diamond industry". He argued that "...the gem and jewelry industry cannot even think of employing children, not only for moral reasons, but that a child could be injured while polishing or cutting the diamonds."

A 2009 study compared respiratory health issues in over 500 child laborers within the gem polishing industry in Jaipur, India to a similar number of children who had never worked. This study also considered sex, duration of work per day, work experience, and split each group into two age groups. The results showed that, with statistical significance, child laborers in this industry were at higher risk for tuberculosis, and hilar gland enlargement and calcification due to mycobacterial origin. These factors contribute to a higher mortality rate compared to the control group of children who had never worked.

The results of this study also showed that girls were more prevalent in the workforce compared to boys. Statistical analysis showed a significant difference in “respiratory morbid conditions” between the sexes. However, this is more likely due to higher rates of medical neglect, rather than physical differences between the sexes. Those in the higher age group (above the age of 14) also showed a higher risk for respiratory issues.

=== Africa ===
On 28 August 2003, BBC News reported that during the 10-year civil war in Sierra Leone children were used as combatants and child labourers in the diamond mines of Koidu in the north-eastern district of Kono. Children aged between 5 and 16 were used in hard labour, for ten hours a day, "digging in soil and gravel, before sifting with a pan for gemstones and shifting heavy mud believed to contain diamonds." In collaboration with World Vision and Aim Sierra Leone, the Ministry of Gender and Children's Affairs registered 1,200 child miners to get them out of the mines.

On 26 June 2009, Human Rights Watch published a 62-page report titled Diamonds in the Rough. Human Rights Abuses in the Marange Diamond Fields of Zimbabwe, based on its researchers' "more than 100 one-on-one interviews with witnesses, local miners, police officers, soldiers, local community leaders, victims and relatives, medical staff, human rights lawyers, and activists in Harare, Mutare, and Marange district in eastern Zimbabwe", conducted in February 2009.

According to the report, "following the discovery of diamonds in Marange in June 2006, the police and army have used brutal force to control access to the diamond fields and to take over unlicensed diamond mining and trading. Some income from the fields has been funnelled to high-level party members of ZANU-PF, which is now part of a power-sharing government that urgently needs revenue as the country faces a dire economic crisis." According to the report, some children work up to eleven hours per day with no pay, and by the estimate of a local lawyer, up to 300 children continue to work for soldiers in the Marange diamond fields.

In December 2014, the U.S. Department of Labor issued a List of Goods Produced by Child Labor or Forced Labor that mentioned Angola, the Central African Republic, the Democratic Republic of the Congo, Guinea, Liberia, and Sierra Leone as part of the 74 countries with significant incidence of child labor and forced labor as far as the diamond industry is concerned.

== Working conditions ==
Child Slave Labor News argued that it is reported that in the late 1980s, about 11% and in 1994, 16% of the workforce was underage in diamond industry. "Currently there are over 171 million children that work in hazardous work sites such as factories and mines."

CSLN further argued the diamond mines are dangerous work sites, "open pits of heavy minerals, oil, machinery exhaust, and any other rubbish seeps into". It is reported that diamond miners are exposed health risks and hazards, including malaria, dysentery, cholera and sexual diseases. In addition to those diseases, child labourers who are subjected to working in poor conditions including overcrowding, abuse, long work hours and cheap pay in diamond mines suffer from eye strain, headaches, malnutrition, and respiratory problems. While they are paid for how many diamonds they can polish or cut per day. The ordinary amount of money a worker will get for polishing the uppermost section of a diamond is two rupees, which is below eight US cents, while workers who make smaller diamonds, might be paid 15 to 20 US dollars per week. Child slaves in Surat sleep in their workplace or in a small hovel instead of a home. The International Confederation of Free Trade Unions has claimed that child labour was prospering in the diamond industry in Western India, where the majority of the world's diamonds are cut and polished while workers are often paid only a fraction of 1% of the value of the stones they cut in 1997.

Child workers are used as slaves since business owners exploit them as cheap employment to raise more profit and diamond industry is "an infamous venue of exploitation towards youth workers" like mines and sweatshops in South Africa or India while the diamond is overpriced and funded for wars. The majority of the third world country families are poor therefore rely on their children's income to survive. Additionally since most children do not have the opportunity to gain an education from their local school system, working at a sweatshop is their only option in life. In other instances, employers pays the family in advance and in turn, the child works to pay off the debt, which is called bonding, yet bonded children cannot pay their family's debt because of interest. With the increase in owed money, bonded children are forced into a life of servitude which will pass onto their descendants.

On the other hand, Civil wars usually shut down all government services. Countries like Sierra Leone, which depend on diamonds for much of its economic activity, not only face disruption in production (which reduces the supply), but also a thriving black market in conflict diamonds, which drives down the price for what diamonds are produced.

== Cultural depictions ==
On 4 July 2005 American rap star Kanye West, released a song titled Diamonds from Sierra Leone as the lead single of his second studio album, Late Registration, containing a repeated sample of the theme song for the 1971 James Bond film, Diamonds Are Forever as performed by Shirley Bassey. The song focuses on the hard life of child workers in Sierra Leone, like other West African nations who since 1991 having been forced to mine conflict diamonds and die in civil wars financed by them: "Good Morning! This ain't Vietnam. Still, people lose hands, legs, arms for real/Little was known of Sierra Leone, and how it connect to the diamonds we own...". The music video was directed by Hype Williams and shot entirely in black-and-white in Prague, features visuals of young African children toiling away in mines under the careful watch of their wardens with juxtaposed with scenes of wealthy Westerners shopping in boutiques and trying on jewelry.

== Forceful relocation of indigenous Bushman people by De Beers ==
When mines are located on the land indigenous people including children, they had to be moved to a different area to construct a mine to collect gems. In Botswana, a long dispute has existed between the interests of the mining company, De Beers, and the relocation of the Bushman tribe from the land to explore diamond resources. The Bushmen have been facing threats from government policies since at least 1980, when the diamond resources were discovered. A campaign is being fought in an attempt to bring an end to what Survival International considers to be a "genocide" of a tribe that has been living in those lands for tens of thousands of years. On the grounds that their hunting and gathering has become "obsolete" and their presence is no longer compatible with "preserving wildlife resources", they were persecuted by the government to make them leave the reserve. To get rid of them, they have had their water supplies cut off, they have been taxed, fined, beaten and tortured. Several international supermodels, including Iman, Lily Cole and Erin O'Connor, who were previously involved with advertising for the companies' diamonds, have backed down after realizing the consequences raised by this scandal, and now support the campaign. De Beers sold its Botswana mine to Gem Diamonds in 2007.

In a two-year long court case ending in 2006, the Botswana High Court reached a decision to allow the Bushman people to return to their land in the Central Kalahari Game Reserve. There were six issues in this case regarding 189 Bushmen applicants; the court ruled that the 2002 decision to halt services to the tribe was not unlawful, the government is not responsible to restore those services, the applicants had legally possessed the Central Kalahari Game Preserve land, the tribe had been removed from that land without consent, the government's decision to deny game licensing was unlawful, and most importantly, the government's refusal to allow the applicants to enter the game reserve land was unlawful. While the courts did not rule in favor of the Bushman people on all points, the applicants were allowed to return to their land.

== Current initiative to combat child labor in the diamond industry ==
Reducing and eliminating children in the workforce, and the pressures that force children into labor is not a simple task. This problem is being tackled by non-government organizations (NGOs), government organizations, and intergovernmental organizations. One such intergovernmental organization, the Organization for Economic Co-operation and Development (OECD) has laid out steps to begin the reduce child labor in Africa, India, and other parts of the world. These steps include raising global awareness, establishing child monitoring and social protection systems, providing education, and promoting financial literacy.

The funding and resources for these initiatives come from government and non-government organizations, both within a given country or from abroad. For example, the United States bureau of International Labor Affairs has provided funding to countries like the Democratic Republic of the Congo to reduce the number of children in the workforce by providing the monitoring and remediation infrastructure that the local government cannot. Similarly, grassroot NGOs such as Child Rights and You (CRY) are focused on rescuing children directly from the workforce in India and re-enrolling them in school.

Investigations from news networks and local NGOs have helped bring the attention of the local governments to the issue of child labor by interacting with these children directly and bringing their stories to light. These children are outspoken in their families’ financial struggles, lack of education, and lack of other opportunities for their older family members to work. This has spurred action from local government bodies, but tangible progress is slow. In 2011, the Democratic Republic of the Congo drafted a project aimed at raising awareness and enforcing child labor laws, but this plan was never officially implemented. Similarly, South Africa had implemented the Child Labour Programme of Action (CLPA) in 2003, though the government struggled to implement policies and more strictly monitor labor across the country. However, more recently, South Africa has been gaining momentum with this project since 2024, hosting workshops around the country that focus on monitoring and data collection.

== See also ==
- Blood diamond
  - Blood Diamonds (documentary)
  - Blood Diamond
- Mining industry of Angola
- Child labour in India#Diamond industry
