= Child labour in Lesotho =

There are significant levels of child labour in Lesotho. The 1997 Lesotho Labour Force Survey found that 4.6% of males who were working full-time, 14.1% of males who were working part-time and 1.3% of male job seekers in Lesotho were aged between 10 and 15 years. Many of these would have been involved in herding and those with part-time work were not necessarily earning an income but may well have been working on family land in subsistence agriculture (i.e. they were economically active but not earning an income).

Boys are most likely to be engaged in paid work, usually herding as reported in the U.S. Department of Labor's List of Goods Produced by Child Labor or Forced Labor. Girls who are paid are primarily engaged in domestic work. It is likely that both boys and girls are engaged in seasonal agricultural work across the border in South Africa, but no data on the extent of this phenomenon is available.

Lesotho is in the process of formulating an Action Programme on the Elimination of Child Labour (APEC), with the assistance of the International Labour Organization's (ILO) programme Towards the Elimination of the worst forms of Child Labour.

A Programme Advisory Committee on Child Labour (PACC), representing government departments, organised labour and business, and civil society guides the development and implementation of the programme.

The different elements of process are described in this article.

Lesotho ratified both the ILO Minimum Age Convention (C138) and the ILO Worst Forms of Child Labour Convention (C182) in 2001. In addition, the country has also ratified the UN Convention on the Rights of the Child in 1992 and the African Charter on the Rights and Welfare of the Child (in 1990).

Lesotho’s Labour Code is the principal law governing employment-related matters in Lesotho. This law defines a “child” as a person under the age of 15, and a “young person” as a person over the age of 15 but under the age of 18.
