= Child labour in Botswana =

Child labour in Botswana is defined as the exploitation of children through any form of work which is harmful to their physical, mental, social and moral development. Child labour in Botswana is characterised by the type of forced work at an associated age, as a result of reasons such as poverty and household-resource allocations. Child labour in Botswana is not of higher percentage according to studies. The United States Department of Labor states that due to the gaps in the national frameworks, scarce economy, and lack of initiatives, "children in Botswana engage in the worst forms of child labour". The International Labour Organization is a body of the United Nations which engages to develop labour policies and promote social justice issues. The International Labour Organization (ILO) in convention 138 states the minimum required age for employment to act as the method for "effective abolition of child labour" through establishing minimum age requirements and policies for countries when ratified. Botswana ratified the Minimum Age Convention in 1995, establishing a national policy allowing children at least fourteen-years old to work in specified conditions. Botswana further ratified the ILO's Worst Forms of Child Labour Convention, convention 182, in 2000.

The ILO's International Programme on the Elimination of Child Labour (IPEC) funded the country in regard to the Towards the Elimination of the Worst Forms of Child Labour programme (TECL) in Botswana. In 2004 the Programme Advisory Committee on Child Labour (PACC) was founded to overlook the Towards the Elimination of the Worst Forms of Child Labour (TECL) in Botswana . Some studies have argumentative stances upon the dealing of child labour in Botswana. As stated by Eva Procek in her 2006 Discussion document on Child Labour in Botswana "explicit time-bound strategies to address child labour and worst forms of child labour specifically have not been developed".

== Current findings of child labour in Botswana ==
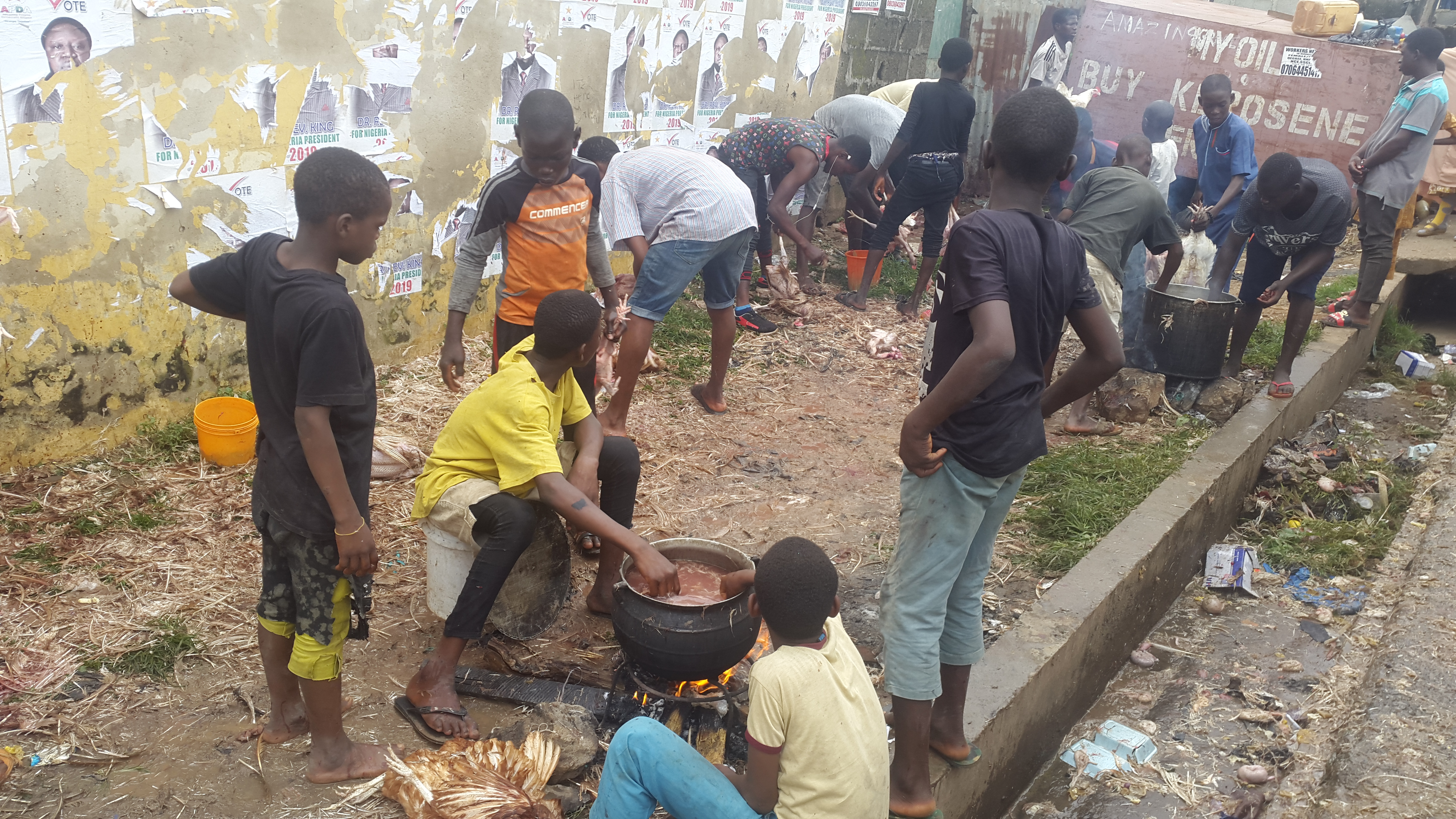
Child labour is any form of work harmful to the well-being of a child. It can impact ability to participate in other activities such as schooling.

The United States of Labour has carried out a study into the issue of child labour in Botswana and has reported findings. The United States Department of Labor in their 2018 Child Labor and Forced Labor Reports, for Botswana, has stated that "Botswana has made minimal advancement towards eliminating child labour in 2018". The United States Department of Labor further states that "Botswana engages in the worst forms of child labor, including in commercial sexual exploitation, forced labor in cattle herding, and forced domestic work, each sometimes as a result of human trafficking". Gaps in the legal system alongside poorly directed social initiatives, as stated by The United States Department of Labor have resulted in contemporary accounts of child labour in Botswana.

== Causes ==
The International Labour Organization accounts that Children "work for survival" and for other reasons which have repressed their ability to act freely. Underlying factors such as geographic location, demographics and poverty are some causes of child labour in Botswana.

=== Geographic ===
Botswana is a landlocked country situated in the south-west division of Africa. Sonia Bhalotra in her OECD SOCIAL, EMPLOYMENT AND MIGRATION WORKING PAPERS study states that due to "stagnated economic growth, HIV/AIDS, conflict, famine and poor hygiene has escalated the issue of child labour in Sub-Saharan Africa". The 2016 Global Estimates of Child Labour ILO report states that "one in five African Children face child labour". The report states that in the continent 72.1 million children work as labourers and 31.5 million work in hazardous conditions, with this being more than-twice the amount in comparison to other regions. Findings from the 2016 Global Estimates of Child Labour ILO report show that the agriculture sector across the continent accounts for 85% of child labourers, of many working in family enterprises and farms, primarily engaging in commercial farming or livestock herding. Further, traditional approaches in African communities have seen children leaving schooling to enter the workforce. This is seen in an African context to promote the development of life and physical skills contrary to western methodologies . An example of this can be seen through the rural Pare people of Tanzania, Sub-Saharan Africa, involving 5 year olds to tend crops.

==== Transmission to Botswana ====
A transmission of the child labour issues from an overall African context can be seen in Botswana. The United States Department of Labor states in their 2010 Worst Forms of Child Labour Report that a poor economic outlook for families and resource allocations influences the integration of Children in the labour force in many instances such where "parents from rural areas send their children to the city to live with wealthier families and to work as domestic servants". The report further establishes that many children are heavily engaged in hazardous forms of agriculture, where children "manage herds of livestock in isolated areas for days without proper food and shelter". Botswana is a key source and destination for commercial sexual exploitation of children. Impoverished children are forced as workers and trafficked to clientele through high-ways and truck drivers.

==== Communities ====
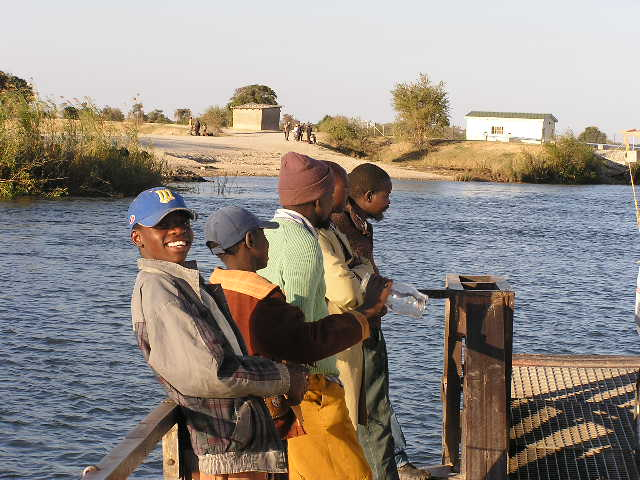
Children from the Okavango Delta community

Botswana is home to many ethnic groups such to the San people and the Okavango Delta people. Matyas Baan in his article Realising Children's Rights in Botswana states that these communities are "disadvantaged and vulnerable due to being displaced remotely or considered as outcasts". The San community is a minority ethnic group, which is remotely located, distant from main-land services, which has led to social-protection issues in regards to children. Children of these communities have reduced access to services such as education and are open to take upon roles primarily in family enterprises and farms or to be exploited into sexual exploitation and trafficking.

=== Changing Demographics ===
Changes in demographics reflect changing social behaviours and actions of people to satisfy specific circumstances. Changes in demographics through intra-household resource allocation, parental investment and household requirements in Botswana has seen children work for individual and household needs, being excluded from schooling and uptaking "small scale entrepreneurship". The Caldwell theory of wealth (1982), reflects how countries with upward net flow wealth, such through peasant farmers, are inclined for higher rates of reproduction to satisfy for old age care and political status. Higher reproduction rates greatly influence the investment of parents towards their children and their activities such as schooling. The limited distribution for household resources and wealth towards children gives rise to child labour. The impact of intra-household resource allocation can be investigated in the Okavango Delta People of Botswana. A 1992 study into five ethnic groups of the community reflect that out of 122 children 20 attended school, of which 15 had to travel 30 km or further, resulting in trade-offs to the local economies of herding, milking and graining. A study by John Bock in his Evolutionary demography and intra-household time allocation, has resulted in findings for the correlation of time and resource allocation in relation to Children education and participation in labour. The study shows how changing parental investment, marital status, availability of alternative productivity tasks, birth order and sex of children "have implications to understand child labour and time allocations and consequent welfare".

=== Poverty ===
Poverty is the condition where a community or individuals lack the access to basic necessities and financial resources to sustain a minimum standard of living. Botswana accounts for 36.7% of families living under the poverty datum line, which has seen the youth to be vulnerable. In 2012 the Minister of Labour and Home Affairs, Peter Siele, visited and talked to a 12 year old out-of-school worker about not attending school. The response recorded was "lehuma ke lone le le ntireleng gore ke tlogele sekolo, ke bolawa ke tlala" (poverty forced me out of school, I suffer from hunger). Negative macroeconomic indicators have influenced the inefficiencies of budget allocations towards children-based initiatives. Eva Procek in her 2006 Discussion document on child labour in Botswana investigates that children in rural and remote area's are vulnerable. Procek states that children of rural groups such as from the San community experience high levels of poverty due to high illiteracy rates, being prone to join the labour force early to support their households as they are "caught between conflicting cultural expectations". Issues of debt and financial constrains also result in children to uptake roles in the labour force.

== Extent and Scope ==
The United States Department of State in their 2017 Botswana Human Rights report states that the widespread scale of the issue sees "children within the country engaging in the worst forms of labour" including: commercial sexual exploitation, agriculture and forced domestic work. The Ministry of Labour and Health accounts for 25000 Children under the age of 15 working on farms. A further 1500 are accounted for domestic work in wealthy households. Botswana further engages to be a source and destination for commercial trafficking of children, specifically through truck and highway clientele.

=== 2005/2006 Labour Force Survey ===
The 2005/2006 labour force survey from the Central Statistics Office is an early study analysing the trends of the labour force in relation to children employment status in Botswana. The survey of 415,751 children saw that 72.4 percent were engaged in full time schooling, 21.2 percent were involved in the labour force alongside schooling and 2.6 percent were primarily working. A gender based analysis in the study shows that only 69.2% of males at the time were participating in schooling in comparison to the 75.1% of females. 39,170 children explicitly stated the reason for their employment with the two most prevalent reasons accounting for family assistance (62.8%), and personal financial needs (12.8%).

Child Employment and Schooling Status by Gender of Child
Child employment and schooling status	Gender		Total % (N= 415,751)
Child employment and schooling status	Male % (N=207,713)	Female % (208,038)	Total % (N= 415,751)
Working and schooling	24.1	18.3	21.2
Working and not schooling	3.5	1.8	2.6
Not working and schooling	69.2	75.1	72.0
Not working and not schooling	3.2	4.8	4.0
Total	100.0	100.0	100.0

Source: Authors' calculations based on CSO Labour Force Survey (2005/06)

=== Impacts ===
The impacts of child labour can be seen interlinked in affecting the welfare of many involved children . Impacts are seen through education and the consequences of poverty.

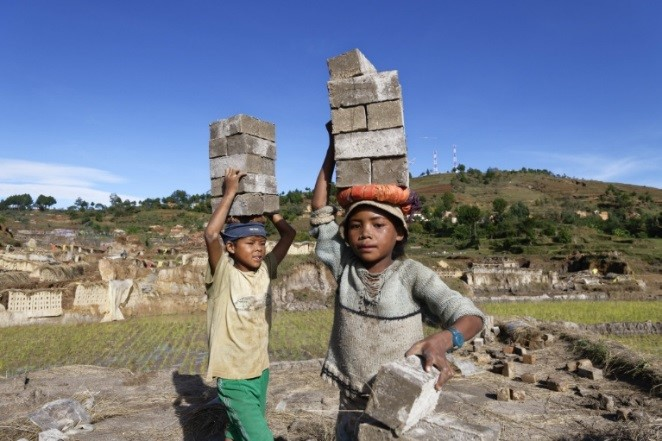
Child labour sees children engaging in hazardous and harmful working conditions.

==== Education ====
In Botswana child labour "shares a negative correlation with education", as established by the Determinants of Child Labour and Schooling in Botswana report through the analysis of the labour force survey findings in 2005/2006. Further, 2016 UNICEF findings account for 9% of the child population of Botswana to be engaged in child labour, further showing that 16% of primary school aged kids are not attending school. Demographic impacts such as parental investment and location of residence further impact the ability to engage in schooling of children. School attendance is affected as secondary education rates are declining due to the tuition costs. For example, this is seen through a 35.7% net attendance out of 56.7% enrolled males.

==== Consequents of Poverty ====
The transmission of intergenerational poverty through the degraded economic outlook of Botswana, sees 2 out of 3 children missing secondary school. Emmanuel Bothale in his The Case for Children's Budgeting in Botswana uses The Poverty Map (Moseki, 2009) and UNDP Human development Reports (2009,2010) to account for a high cumulative poverty index of 22.9% in Botswana. Sexual exploitation and hygiene issues are a consequent of long-term poverty, as seen in the 2010 findings from the Botswana Press Agency. The agency carried out a 'sex-study' which established that girls resort to prostitution out of economic need and "to put food on the table. Further, communal poverty, has resulted in poor hygiene and health; for example, under 5 youth mortality, has increased by 0.5% (1990–2012). The prevalence of the poor hygiene has further seen the spread of diseases such as HIV/AIDS. Poor preventative measures sees a 15.7% prevalence rate of HIV in 0-18 year old orphans.

== Dynamics ==
There are government body and frameworks alongside social initiatives in place to address the issue.

=== Government Outlook ===
Between 2006 and 2008 the country had been in the process of formulating the National Action Programme towards the Elimination of Child Labour in Botswana, which was nationally endorsed in February 2008. This was drafted with the assistance of the International Labour Organization's (ILO) programme, Towards the Elimination of the worst forms of Child Labour. A Programme Advisory Committee on Child Labour (PACC), representing government departments, organised labour and business, and civil society, guides the development and implementation of the programme. The national government has developed policies in order to coordinate their response to the issue. The National Action Programme towards the Elimination of Child Labour in Botswana outline the governments approach to create legislation and policies around the issue to create awareness. The Ministry of Labor and Home Affairs sustainability plan is another policy which sees volunteers and government affiliates work as labour inspectors to report accounts of child labour to social workers and school teachers to better understand school attendance trends and employment status.

The government has established mechanisms to coordinate their response to the issue. The Human Trafficking Committee was established by the 2014 Anti-trafficking bill and is led by the Ministry of Defence, Justice, and Security (MDJS) to act as a reporting and referral mechanism. The Advisory Committee on Child Labour is another mechanism involving NGO volunteers and government officials to report issues to the government. The United States Department of State in their 2017 Botswana Human Rights report presents an argument that the mechanisms "have lacked efficacy due to scarce resources and inability to target rural areas".

=== Legal Framework ===
Botswana ratified the ILO Minimum Age Convention in 1995 (C138) and the ILO Worst Forms of Child Labour Convention (C182) in 2000. In addition, the country also ratified both the UN Convention on the Rights of the Child and the African Charter on the Rights and Welfare of the Child in 1995. Botswana's Employment Act is the principal law governing employment-related matters in Botswana. It aims to protect children against exploitation and hazardous employment, defined as any work that is dangerous to the child's health, development and morals. The United States Department of Labor in the 2018 Child Labour and Forced Labour Reports, for Botswana, states that "gaps exist in Botswana's legal framework to adequately protect children from child labor" as there is no compulsory age of education legislation, inconsistent to the standards set by the ILO.

==== Enforcement ====
The government has a framework to assist for the enforcement of law in through criminal and labour laws. The Ministry of Employment, Labour Productivity and Skills Development enforces child labour law's and policies and is further authorised by the Employment Act to conduct labour inspections. Findings from the United States Department of Labor account for 2335 labour investigations in Botswana for 2017, which had reduced from 4999 accounts in 2016. The Ministry of Defence, Justice, and Security facilitates the enforcement of criminal law in approach to child labour. In 2017 the Directorate of Public Prosecutions (DPP) accounted for 7 convictions in the ill-treatment of children but did not explicitly link causation to child labour.

=== Social Initiatives ===
Government funds social initiatives to address the issue of child labour are part of the framework aimed at the issue. In conjunction with resources from non-governmental organization's, these programs cater to create awareness for the issue and provide resources available to the community. The government funded Orphan Care Program subsidises school fees and provides meals to children to promote educational participation. Another program is the Needy Children and Needy Students program facilitated by the Ministry of Local Government and Rural Development in aim to provide essential resources and meals to poor families.

== Recommendations ==
Recommendations from government agencies and other bodies convey possible solutions to address the issue. The United States Department of Labor in their 2018 Worst Forms of Child Labour report states that amendment to the Employment Act will "reduce the gap between bodies and enforcement agencies to cater towards eliminating the issue alongside a minimum-age requirement for schooling. Eva Procek in her 2006 Discussion Document on Child Labour in Botswana states possible strategies to alleviate causes, such as poverty, through National Youth Policy grants and reviews in the literacy programmes "to prevent children falling into detrimental work". Emmanuel Bothale in his The Case for Children's Budgeting in Botswana states that budget allocations towards children and socially based initiatives are a "critical argument to improve upon the negative macroeconomic indicators". Further, more studies are required to enable full engagement to understand the true scope and extent of the issue.
