= Children used by adults in the commission of crime =

The use, procuring or offering of a child by others for illegal activities, including the trafficking or production of drugs, is one of the predefined worst forms of child labour in terms of the International Labour Organization's Worst Forms of Child Labour Convention, adopted in 1999.

It is also known as Children used by adults in the commission of crime (CUBAC).

In terms of the Worst Forms of Child Labour Recommendation ratifying countries should ensure that CUBAC is a criminal offence, and also provide for other criminal, civil or administrative remedies to ensure the effective enforcement of such national legislation (Article III(12) to (14)).

== See also ==
- Mule (smuggling)
- South Africa Pilot project on CUBAC, 2004 to 2007
- Victimology
