= Child labour in Eswatini =

Child labour in Eswatini is a controversial issue that affects a large portion of the country's population. Child labour is often seen as a human rights concern because it is "work that deprives children of their childhood, their potential and their dignity, and that is harmful to physical and mental development," as defined by the International Labour Organization (ILO). Additionally, child labour is harmful in that it restricts a child's ability to attend school or receive an education. The ILO recognizes that not all forms of children working are harmful, but this article will focus on the type of child labour that is generally accepted as harmful to the child involved.

== Origin ==
During the colonial period between 1914 and 1947, child labour played an important role in the British government's control of Eswatini. Swazi labour history has previously failed to acknowledge the contributions children made to the labour industry during the colonial period, perhaps because children are often seen as extensions of their parents rather than as individuals. At the beginning, children usually performed unpaid labour, but beginning in the 1930s paid labour became more common. Like today, agriculture and farming was one of the largest sectors of child labour.

== Demographics ==
Many of the children in Eswatini subjected to harsh work conditions are victims of human trafficking. Despite the Eswatini government's attempts to reduce child labour, victims of human trafficking have historically worked in the most severe types of child labour jobs. AIDS orphans are also at a greater risk to be exploited for cheap labour. In 2006, half of all children engaged in Eswatini's sex trade were orphans.

== Causes ==
Poverty is one of the most common determinants of child labour, and 69% of Swazis were living in poverty as of 2006. Because child labour interferes with schooling, an individual's ability to escape poverty is significantly reduced. This can create child-labour traps, in which the next generation is also forced into child labour because their family is still in poverty. Specifically, the cost of transportation is a barrier that prevents poor children from attending school in many African countries. According to Hannie Dlamini, the chairman of the Eswatini Aids Support Organisation (EASO), "the extended family system is breaking down and there is no-one to look after orphans," meaning that "fifteen year olds are responsible for homes."

Eswatini is a lower middle-income country, and yet serious poverty exists because there is a very unequal distribution of wealth. The richest 10% control nearly half of the country's wealth, with the bottom 43% living in chronic poverty. In 1999, UNICEF found that many children initially went to work because their parents were unemployed, and the family needed a source of income.

Orphaned children are at increased risk, and many orphans have lost their parents to AIDS. Eswatini has the highest HIV prevalence rate in the world, with nearly a quarter of the total population infected.

Number of children in a household also affects child labour vulnerability. Because perceived quality of a child tends to decrease as the quantity of children in a family rise, parents and others are less concerned with protecting children that are from large families. In addition, large families have more people to share their income and resources between, consequently increasing their risk of poverty.

== Controversy over morality ==
Although child labour is often seen as inherently bad because it has been found to be linked with adolescent mortality, some also argue that it should not be banned. For example, should a child be permitted to work after voluntarily signing a labour contract? Eswatini's growing poverty causes a need for children to work, particularly in rural areas. Also, 66% of the country's population is unable to meet basic food needs so sometimes, child labour may be the only solution for a family.

The ILO also recognizes that some types of child labour may be permissible and makes the distinction between "child labour" and "hazardous work." In 2012, the organization reported that 168 million children aged 5–17 are subjected to child labour worldwide, with 85 million of these cases considered to be hazardous work.

== Efforts to reduce child labour ==
Globally, efforts to reduce child labour have been successful in recent years. The ILO reports that both child labour and hazardous work have decreased since 2000.

=== Continental efforts ===
In 1963, the Organisation of African Unity (OAU) was formed, with Eswatini joining in 1968. Its purpose was to agree upon a list of human rights and enforce them continentally. The group produced the African Charter on Human and Peoples' Rights in 1981, which included an article on the protection of children. In 2002, the OAU was replaced by the African Union (AU), whose vision is that of "an integrated, prosperous and peaceful Africa, driven by its own citizens and representing a dynamic force in global arena."

=== 1980 Employment Act ===
The government of Eswatini has also made several independent efforts to reduce child labour. In 1980, the Employment Act was passed, mandating that children not be employed for any industrial work, unless the child was a direct family member of the employer, or the work was primarily educational. The Employment Act defines a child as a person under the age of 15. For non-industrial labour, the Act made it illegal to employ children during school hours, for night shifts, for more than 6 hours a day or 33 hours a week, or for more than four hours continuously without an hour-long break.

Additionally, the Employment Act outlines restrictions for hiring "young persons," defined as those over the age of 15 but under 18. Again, educational value is the main exception to the restrictions, as apprenticeship or vocational training may be approved by the Minister. Both children and young people are prohibited from work that is underground, involves selling alcohol, or is dangerous to their physical or emotional wellbeing.

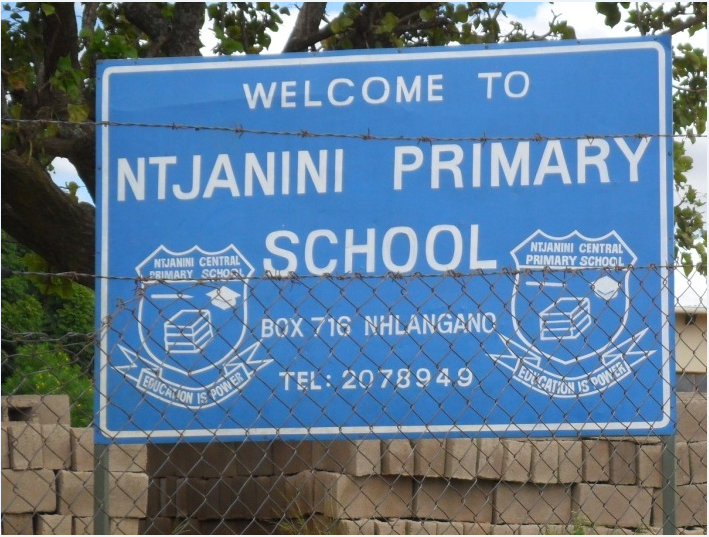
One of the consequences of child labour is that it prevents children from receiving an education

=== RECLISA Project ===
In 2004, the RECLISA (Reducing Exploitative Child Labour in Southern Africa) Project was launched in South Africa, Botswana, Lesotho, Namibia and Eswatini. Targeting both those already involved in exploitative labour and those at risk for it, the project supported 2,000 children in Eswatini. In addition to ensuring that children were enrolled in primary and secondary schools, the project worked to raise public awareness of exploitative child labour. For the first four years, the RECLISA Project was funded by Khulisa Management Services. Since, the Swazi government has taken over funding to continue to support children. In 2014, the Swazi government assisted orphans and other vulnerable children by paying their school fees and made plans to help pay for the final year of primary school for more children. However, because Eswatini does not have a compulsory education age, this was difficult to enforce and was only partially successful.

=== Ratifications and agreements ===
Eswatini ratified both the ILO Minimum Age Convention (C138) and the ILO Worst Forms of Child Labour Convention (C182) in 2002. It also signed the African Charter on the Rights and Welfare of the Child in 1992, but has not yet ratified it.

== Types of child labour ==
=== Agriculture ===
Globally, 58.6% of child labourers work in agriculture. In Eswatini, 84% of the country's poor population lives in rural areas, and nearly three-quarters of the total population relies on subsistence farming for survival. As a result, child labour in Eswatini is dominated by agricultural work. Specifically, the country's top three products are sugar cane, maize, and roots and tubers. Wood pulp, citrus and other fruit, cotton, and meat are also important to Eswatini's agricultural sector. Livestock herding, a type of agricultural work, is considered to be one of the most severe forms of child labour.

=== Industry ===
Industry jobs are the third most common type of child labour worldwide, at 7.2%. Several international companies such as Coca-Cola and Cadbury have invested in Eswatini, building factories there. Coal and diamond mining have historically been major industries, but their importance has significantly declined since the 1960s. Eswatini also exports textiles, but thousands of textile workers lost their jobs in 2015 when the country was removed from the U.S. fair trade agreement, due to human rights concerns.

=== Sex work ===
Commercial sexual exploitation is one of the most severe forms of child labour, with orphans being particularly vulnerable. The majority of children involved in sex work in Eswatini live away from their place of birth. Young girls are trafficked to South Africa, trading sex for food. High rates of prostitution and other forms of sex work spread infectious diseases, perpetuating the issue of HIV in Eswatini.

=== Tourism ===
During the second half of the 20th century, Eswatini tourism industry benefited from the lack of war and relative peace within the country. In order to entertain tourists, however, children are sometimes employed and made to wear traditional attire. Along the scenic highway in Piggs Peak, for example, costumed children dance for tourists for a fee.

== See also ==
- Child labour in Africa
- Human rights in Eswatini
