= Child labour in Namibia =

Child labour in Namibia is not always reported. This involved cases of child prostitution as well as voluntary and forced agricultural labour, cattle herding and vending.

== Background ==
Namibia ratified both the ILO Minimum Age Convention (C138) and the ILO Worst Forms of Child Labour Convention (C182) in 2000. In addition, the country also ratified the UN Convention on the Rights of the Child in 1990. Namibia signed the African Charter on the Rights and Welfare of the Child in 1999, but has not ratified it as yet.

== Surveys ==
According to the 1999 Namibian Child Activities Survey child labour exists in the country, predominantly in the agricultural sector. The results of a follow-up survey conducted in December 2005 have not been made publicly available.

A 2013 Food and Agriculture Organization (FAO) report indicates that particularly in livestock herding, child labour is prevalent in Namibia, and children work from a very young age, although the extent of the work varies per child. Additional hazards that arise from children herding animals are "disrupted physical, mental, moral and social development", the danger of being bitten, extreme weather conditions, and the infection with animal-borne diseases.

== Legislative intervention ==
Between 2006 and 2008 the country has been in the process of formulating the Action Programme on the Elimination of Child Labour in Namibia, which was nationally endorsed in February 2008. This was done with the assistance of the International Labour Organization's (ILO) programme Towards the Elimination of the worst forms of Child Labour. A Programme Advisory Committee on Child Labour (PACC), representing government departments, organised labour and business, and civil society guides the development and implementation of the programme.
