= List of Goods Produced by Child Labor or Forced Labor =

Annual list by U.S. Department of Labor

The List of Goods Produced by Child Labor or Forced Labor is an annual publication issued by the United States Government's Bureau of International Labor Affairs at the U.S. Department of Labor. It was published in the December 2014 Department of Labor report issued in its sixth updated edition. The list is published under the direction of the Trafficking Victims Protection Reauthorization Act (TVPRA) of 2005, which the U.S. Congress reauthorized in 2008, 2011 and 2013. The U.S. House of Representatives passed the Justice for Victims of Trafficking Act in January 2015.

As of 5 September 2024, the date of the most recent publication, the list comprises 204 goods from 82 countries and areas. The figures for 2018 were 148 goods from 76 countries, slightly higher than the numbers published in 2014 when the list had 136 goods that ILAB "[had] reason to believe are produced by forced labor or child labor" in 74 countries. According to the 2014 report, agriculture, forestry and fishing were the sectors where child labor and forced labor were most common. Manufacturing, mining, quarrying and pornography completed the list.

== History ==
Founded in 1947, the Bureau of International Labor Affairs (ILAB) has published numerous reports on the subject of labor, child labor, forced labor and forced child labor around the world. Since 2009, the Bureau has been issuing an updated List of Goods Produced by Child Labor or Forced Labor yearly. The report listed 122 goods from 58 countries in its first edition in 2009. In 2014, it listed 136 goods from 74 countries.

The TVPRA List indicates the goods and countries where ILAB has recorded a significant incidence of child labor and forced labor without specifying the individual companies or businesses involved. Exhaustive research has been conducted in order to provide a comprehensive list based on publicly available sources.

In 2009, the Bureau's research reported more goods produced by child labor than by forced labor. Agricultural crops represented the largest category of goods. In fact, the list had 60 agricultural goods, 38 manufactured goods and 23 mined goods. Child labor and forced labor were mostly adopted in the production of cotton in the agricultural sector, the making of bricks in manufacturing, and gold mining in the mining industries. In 2014, agriculture, forestry and fishing represented the largest category of goods in the list and 126 goods were reported to be globally produced by child labor in comparison with 55 goods produced by forced labor. Instances of such working conditions were observed in relatively the same sectors.

In 2014, the list identified India as the country with the most goods produced by both child labor and forced labor with up to 25 goods listed. India is followed by Brazil (16 goods), Bangladesh (15 goods), Burma (14 goods), the Philippines (13 goods) and China (12 goods).

The TVPRA List aims at raising awareness about child labor and forced labor at the national and international level and reinforces the primordial purpose of governments and societies to effectively eliminate forced labor.

== See also ==
- Unfree labour
- Child labour in Africa
- Legal working age
- Child slavery
- Trafficking of children
- Children in cocoa production
