= BLNS Countries =

BLNS Countries is a term used to describe Botswana, Lesotho, Namibia and Eswatini (formerly Swaziland) collectively. The term is mostly used in the context of the Southern African Customs Union to refer to those members with less economic and political power than South Africa.
