= African Charter on the Rights and Welfare of the Child =

The African Charter on the Rights and Welfare of the Child (also called the ACRWC or Children's Charter) was adopted by the Organisation of African Unity (OAU) in 1990 (in 2001, the OAU legally became the African Union) and was entered into force in 1999. Like the United Nations Convention on the Rights of the Child (CRC), the Children's Charter is a comprehensive instrument that sets out rights and defines universal principles and norms for the status of children. The ACRWC and the CRC are the only international and regional human rights treaties that cover the whole spectrum of civil, political, economic, social and cultural rights.

It calls for the creation of an African Committee of Experts on the Rights and Welfare of the Child (Committee of Experts). Its mission is to promote and protect the rights established by the ACRWC, to practice applying these rights, and to interpret the disposition of the ACRWC as required of party states, African Union (AU) institutions, or all other institutions recognized by AU or by a member state.

== Focus on children's rights in Africa ==
Children in Africa are affected by many different types of abuse, including economic and sexual exploitation, gender discrimination in education and access to health, and their involvement in armed conflict. Other factors affecting African children include migration, early marriage, differences between urban and rural areas, child-headed households, street children and poverty. Furthermore, child workers in Sub-Saharan Africa account for about 80 million children or 4 out of every 10 children under 14 years old which is the highest child labour rate in the world.

The ACRWC defines a "child" as a human being below the age of 18 years. It recognises the child's unique and privileged place in African society and that African children need protection and special care. It also acknowledges that children are entitled to the enjoyment of freedom of expression, association, peaceful assembly, thought, religion, and conscience. It aims to protect the private life of the child and safeguard the child against all forms of economic exploitation and against work that is hazardous, interferes with the child's education, or compromises his or her health or physical, social, mental, spiritual, and moral development. It calls for protection against abuse and bad treatment, negative social and cultural practices, all forms of exploitation or sexual abuse, including commercial sexual exploitation, and illegal drug use. It aims to prevent the sale and trafficking of children, kidnapping, and begging of children.

== Children's Charter vs. Convention on the Rights of the Child ==
The Children's Charter originated because the member states of the AU believed that the CRC missed important socio-cultural and economic realities particular to Africa. It emphasises the need to include African cultural values and experiences when dealing with the rights of the child in such as:

- Challenging traditional African views which often conflict with children's rights such as child marriage, parental rights and obligations towards their children, and children born out of wedlock
- Expressly saying that the Children's Charter is higher than any custom, tradition, cultural or religious practice that doesn't fit with the rights, duties and obligations in the Charter
- The Children's Charter has a clearer definition of the child as a person aged under 18 years old
- Outright prohibition on the recruitment of children (i.e. under 18 years old) in armed conflict and deals with conscription of children into the armed forces
- Prohibiting marriages or betrothals involving children
- Prohibiting the use of children as beggars
- Granting girls the right to return to school after pregnancy
- Promoting affirmative action for girls' education
- Tackling specific African issues that affect children. For example, it called for the confrontation and abolishment of apartheid and similar systems; and although, apartheid is now over, this provision is still applicable to children living under regimes practicing ethnic, religious or other forms of discrimination
- Protecting internally displaced and refugee children
- Protecting imprisoned expectant mothers and mothers of infants and young children
- Providing a way for children themselves to petition the Children's Charter's Committee of Experts regarding infringements of their rights
- Including special reference to care of the child by extended families
- Encouraging the state to provide support for parents "in times of need"
- Protecting handicapped children.

The fundamental principles guiding implementation of these rights include:

- Non-discrimination
- The best interests of the child
- The life, survival and development of the child
- Child participation
- Providing for the responsibilities that every child has with regard to their and society, the state and the international community.

== Ratification of the Children's Charter ==
As of 2016, the ACRWC has been ratified by 47 of the 54 states of the African Union, and signed but not ratified by the remaining seven states. Central African Republic, Democratic Republic of the Congo, Sahrawi Arab Democratic Republic, São Tomé and Príncipe, Somalia, South Sudan, and Tunisia have signed but not ratified the Charter. Morocco, a non-AU member state, has also not ratified.

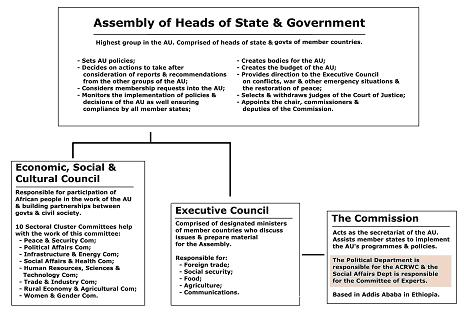
Selected structures within the AU relating to the Children's Charter.

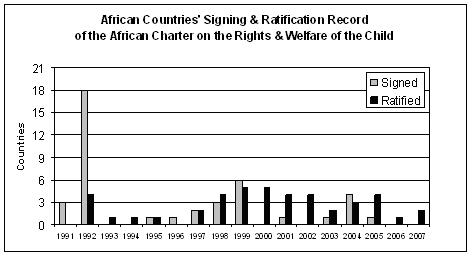
This graph shows the slow progress of both the signing and ratification process of the Children's Charter since it was adopted in 1991.

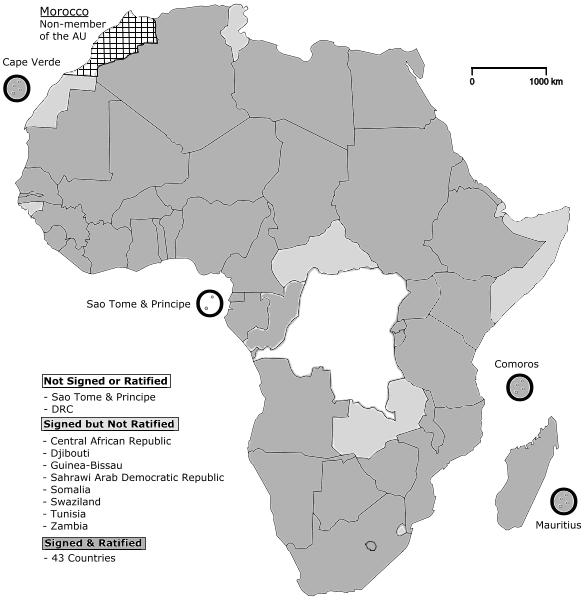
Map of Africa showing the current status as at August 2008 of the Children's Charter.

== Shortcoming and criticism ==
- It doesn't protect children from life imprisonment without the possibility of release
- When dealing with criminal activities, there is no provision for alternative measures such as community rehabilitation
- No mention of the rights such as to remain silent, to be protected from retroactive legislation, to challenge detention, or to be compensated for miscarriages of justice
- Article 20 can be construed as supporting physical punishment by parents as it is unclear regarding the meaning of "domestic discipline;"
- There is some confusion regarding Article 31 that deals with children's responsibilities. Children are required to respect parents, superiors and elders at all times which could conflict with the child's right to participate in decisions that affect them
- The omission of a provision which requires countries to fully commit and use their resources means that the Children's Charter has no way to ensure or force states to provide resources to ensure the realisation of children's rights
- Although the Children's Charter makes provision for special protection measures for the disabled, it fails to expressly include disability as a prohibited ground of discrimination
- Unlike the CRC, which specifically ascribes rights to children of minorities, there is no similar provision in the African Charter, despite many countries in the region having significant populations of minority and indigenous groups.

== African Committee of Experts on the Rights and Welfare of the Child (Committee of Experts) ==
The committee was formed in July 2001, one and half years after the Children's Charter came into force. The members are elected by the Assembly of Heads of State and Government of the African Union. The criteria for the selection of members are:

- Members must be nationals of a state party to the Children's Charter.
- They must be individuals of high moral standing, integrity, impartiality and competence in matters of the rights and welfare of the child.
- Members are nominated by signatory countries and elected by the Assembly of Heads of State of the African Union.
- Members are elected for a term of five years and serve voluntarily in their individual capacity. They may not be re-elected.

The Committee of Experts meets twice each year, usually in May and November in Addis Ababa, Ethiopia. The exact dates depend on other items on the AU agenda around these times. They are empowered to receive and examine the country ("state") reports on the measures they have adopted to implement the provisions of the Children's Charter as well as the progress achieved regarding how the rights are being protected. The final protective function of the Committee of Experts is related to the investigations procedure. They are empowered to resort to any appropriate method of investigation in respect of any issue covered in the Children's Charter.

== Members of the African Committee of Experts on the Rights and Welfare of the Child ==
The current members of the ACERWC are (name, country, position):

- Hon. Wilson Almeida Adão, Angola, Chairperson
- Hon. Aver Gavar, Nigeria, Vice Chairperson
- Hon. Anne Musiwa, Zimbabwe
- Hon. Poloko Nuggert Ntshwarang, Botswana
- Hon. Aboubekrine El Jera, Mauritania
- Hon. Ghislain Roch Etsan, Congo-Brazzaville (RotC)
- Hon. Hermine Kembo Takam Gatsing, Cameroon
- Hon. Sabrina Gahar, Algeria
- Hon. Robert Doya Nanima, Uganda
- Hon. Karoonawtee Chooramun, Mauritius

Position Former Members

- Mr. Benyam Dawit Mezmur, Ethiopia, Chairperson
- Mrs.Fatima Delladj-Sebaa, Algeria, 1st Vice-President
- Prof Julia Sloth-Nielsen, South Africa, 2nd Vice President
- Mr. Clement Julius Mashamba, Tanzania, 3rd Vice-President
- Mr. Alfas Muvavarigwa Chitakunye, Zimbabwe, Rapporteur
- Mr. Cyprien Adébayo, Benin, Member; (former 1st Vice President 2010-2012)
- Mrs. Agnès Kabore, Burkina Faso, Member;(former Chairperson 2010-2012)
- Mr. Andrianirainy Rasamoely, Madagascar, Member
- Mrs. Maryam Uwais, Nigeria, Member
- Mrs. Amal Muhammad El Henqari, Libya, Member
- Mrs. Félicité Muhimpundu, Rwanda, Member

As at October 2008, the elected Committee of Experts were (name, country, position):

- Ms. Seynabou Ndiaye Diakhate, Sénégal, Chairperson
- Ms. Marie Chantal Koffi Appoh, Côte d'Ivoire, Vice-Chairperson
- Ms Boipelo Lucia Seitlhamo, Botswana, Rapporteur
- Hon. Justice Martha Koome, Kenya, Member
- Mrs. Mamosebi T. Pholo, Lesotho, Member
- Mr. Moussa Sissoko, Mali, Member
- Mrs. Dawlat Ibrahim Hassan, Egypt, Member
- Mr. Cyprien Adébayo, Benin, Member
- Mrs. Agnès Kabore, Burkina Faso, Member
- Mr. Andrianirainy Rasamoely, Madagascar, Member
- Mrs. Maryam Uwais, Nigeria, Member

== Challenges faced by the Committee of Experts ==
- Functional secretariat: K.F. Malindi Jr, Founder of The Rights Club and a human and child rights activist notes that the Committee of Experts have yet to establish a fully functional secretariat which means that it cannot carry out its activities or deal with communications as well as country reports. It suffers from a serious lack of resources
- Attitude of member states: Many member states are unenthusiastic about the Children's Charter and are often unwilling to nominate suitable people to sit on the Committee of Experts. Often, the committee members resign midway through their term
- Non-state reporting: A look at states’ reporting history to the Committee of Experts also shows non-commitment by countries to fulfil their treaty obligations in respect of the Children's Charter. The responsibility for preparing and submitting country reports differ from country to country, which makes it difficult for the Committee of Experts to follow up with defaulting states
- The rule of pendency & appropriate bodies: Cases cannot be tried or investigated at the same time in two or more human rights bodies. Thus once a case has been brought before the Committee of Experts, it has to remain there until the legal process has been exhausted. The problem is that it takes an average of two and a half years for cases to be decided by the Committee of Experts
- Other problems: Other important setback identified are the constant lack of legal counsel present at sessions of the Committee to give legal guidance on decisions being taken by the Committee; lack of coordinated cooperation and communication between the African Commission and the Committee and the non- prioritising by the AU of the work of the Committee resulting in delays and cancellation of sessions.

== State party reporting ==
Countries which have ratified the Children's Charter must submit initial reports within two years of ratification or the entry into force of the Charter and every three years thereafter. In 2008, the Committee of Experts started the process of reviewing the first four state reports that had been received from Egypt, Mauritius, Nigeria and Rwanda in May 2008.

The state party report must contain specific information pertaining to children in their country. This includes political, legal, administrative issues that are linked to the requirements of the structure supplied by the Committee of Experts.

Ideally it should be a comprehensive report that includes input from the state, civil society and other recognised bodies at the regional, continental, international levels. But usually, the state report doesn't include much information from civil society. So civil society organisations can submit a second or "alternative" report that contains the information that they have gathered.

Until very recently, this "alternative" report could only be accepted after the state had submitted their report. But now a process has been put into place whereby the state is given 18 months to submit their report, failing that, the "alternative," civil society report will be accepted as that state's report.

Once received, the report then becomes available as a public document and it undergoes a process of:

- Elaboration: The elaboration process is the first process that occurs. The Committee of Experts determines the report's completeness, representativeness, its conformity to the guidelines, etc. and specific information is extracted regarding the children's rights
- Consideration: The consideration process examines the reports to determine if the information supplied reflects the true situation in the country as a kind "photocopy" or "clear picture" at that point in time. This includes determining if there are any gaps or inconsistencies in the information supplied in both the official and the alternative reports
- Follow-up: The follow-up process is where the state and civil society are contacted again to explain and complete any discrepancies or missing information. Further information and interviews may be required before the Committee is satisfied
- Submission to the AU.

Once the State Party and Alternative reports have been finalised, they are submitted to AU Secretariat for translation into the other working languages (English, French, Portuguese and Arabic). Then different Committee of Expert members review the report in a pre-sessional working group in order to identify issues for further discussion with the state and request for any other information that may help when considering the report. Other organisations, civil society organisations, UN groups, who have contributed alternative reports or who are considered relevant may be invited to attend the session on an informal basis. This is where civil society organisations can bring information to the process. A pre-sessional report is produced after this meeting.

After the pre-sessional report has been produced, the members who have been appointed to review the State Party / Alternative Report meet to discuss an in-depth review of the report. Their findings are submitted to the respective state concerned and discussed with high level government representatives. There is no non-governmental organisation or civil society input at this level.

As a result of the in depth discussion, the Committee of Experts will identify problems, progress and differences in implementation of the Children's Charter by the State Party. These recommendations are called "concluding observations" and may include the following:

- The steps that need to be taken
- Agree on recommendations
- Suggest unique decisions suitable for each country
- Changes in the country since the report was prepared
- Follow-ups by the Committee of Experts to obtain more information or clarity.

After the initial State Party / Alternative report has been accepted, the state will then have to submit additional reports every 3 years. These reports are called "periodic reports." This will allow for comparison with the previous report to determine whether there has been progress or if the situation has worsened.

There may also be follow-ups and country visits. The State Party / Alternative Report and recommendations are sent to the Summit of the Heads of States and Government. Civil society is also able to intervene every 3 years to encourage the state to make improvements ahead of the preparation of additional reports.

== Observer status for civil society organisations ==
Civil society organisations and international institutions have played a significant role in the work of the Committee of Experts and they have served as the backbone of the committee's work since inception. International non-governmental organizations have been particularly involved in the work of the committee, providing different kinds of expertise and financial support to most of the work.

Although civil society organisation involvement was minimal in the beginning, over the intervening years they have since taken a pivotal role in ensuring that the committee fulfills its mandate and in providing the necessary support needed to facilitate its work. The adoption of the guidelines for granting observer status will now also ensure that more civil society organisations are able to formally participate and contribute in the process.

According to the proposed guidelines for observer status, some of the ways civil society organisations and associations will be allowed to participate will include:

- Attending opening and closing ceremonies of the Committee of Experts sessions
- Participating in the committee's meetings
- Accessing documents that are not confidential and do not deal with issues concerning the observers
- Being invited to participate in closed sessions dealing with issues that concern them
- Making statements on issues that concern them, provided the statement has been sent to the committee in advance
- Responding to questions they may be asked in meetings.

The guidelines encourage the formation of coalitions by civil society organisations with similar objectives. The following are the requirements for the participation of civil society organisations for observer status are:

- They must be registered in a member state with the mandate to carry out regional and international activities
- Must have been registered for a minimum of three years
- Must have done work in the defence of children's rights
- They must have a recognised headquarters, democratically adopted statutes and a representative structure
- They must submit a list of documentation to aid their application at least three months before a session of the Committee of Experts.

Once the organisation has obtained observer status, it may request the Committee of Experts to include issues of interest on their agenda and to make oral statements at the sessions. They are entitled to receive information on the time, location and agenda of the sessions of the committee. The committee can invite a civil society organisation to participate in the deliberations of the meetings of the committee without a voting right.

The civil society organisations are also under an obligation to establish close relations with the committee and to hold regular consultations on all issues of common interest. Civil society organisations are required to submit reports on their activities every two years. When civil society organisations default on their obligations, the committee may suspend or withdraw the observer status.

== Communications to the Committee of Experts ==
A communication is a complaint submitted to the Committee of Experts regarding a violation of the rights of children under the Children's Charter. The following are some guidelines for those wanting to submit a communication to the Committee of Experts:

- A communication may be submitted by individuals, groups, associations, non-governmental organizations, etc.
- These individuals or groups MUST be recognised by the state, AU or international body
- The state is excluded from the complaints process
- Any violation of child rights may be considered
- The country where the violation has occurred must be a signatory of the Children's Charter.

== Specific requirements of a communication ==
A communication must meet the following criteria:

- It cannot not be anonymous
- It must be written
- It must be submitted within a reasonable deadline or timeframe, depending on the nature of the complaint
- It must be written in a reasonable and non-defamatory tone
- It must be compatible with the AU rules and laws or the Children's Charter
- It must not be exclusively based on information in the media
- Issues must not have been already decided by another investigation, procedure or international regulation
- It must only be submitted when all local / domestic remedies have been exhausted or when the author of the communication is not satisfied with the solution provided at the local / domestic level
- The Committee of Experts can also review its own decision in a communication where the complainant can provide additional information to support his/her case
- The Committee of Experts can receive a communication from a non-State Party (e.g. civil society organisation, individual, group of people) if it is in the best interest of the child.

If the communication meets the above requirements, then it may be considered by the Committee of Experts. When a complaint reaches the committee, a group will be assigned to work on it to decide if it is acceptable. If it is acceptable then they will give feedback both to the country where the problem is located. If there are gaps, then the committee will ask the country to take measures to protect the complainant while it is being investigated further.

The work on the complaint is confidential and is held in closed session debates. Once a decision has been taken, a communication is sent to the country's state department. A member on the Committee of Experts is designated to follow up and coordinate the process. Once the process has been completed, a report is sent to the Committee of the Heads of State and Government.

Children who are the authors or who are the victims in the communication process now have an opportunity to express their opinions to the Committee of Experts. This provision guarantees the cardinal principle of child participation in issues concerning them.

== Investigations ==
Investigations may be initiated because the Committee of Experts has received a communication indicating a serious violation. Investigation missions can be initiated either by a state referring a matter to the Committee of Experts, or the committee can undertake its own investigations, although the Committee may only visit a State Party if invited to do so by the government.

To ensure the investigative mission team has background knowledge of the situation, a preliminary report according to certain guidelines and based on available information is prepared before each investigation. The mission will meet with available state and non-state organisations and people in the country where they will be investigating.

Once the mission has finished its investigation, it has to release a preliminary result to the government and the media in the country of investigation. A final report is then prepared which incorporates the mission's recommendations. This mission report must be attached to the progress report of the Committee to the African Heads of State and Government.

The country that has been investigated has up to 6 months after the adoption of a decision by the Committee of Experts to submit a written reply on what they have done regarding the requirements or measures in the mission report.

The country's response should also include information on any measures in reaction to the recommendations made by the Committee after the mission. Civil society organisations and ‘specialised institutions’ like children's civil society organisations could also be requested to provide information on the situation of children in that state.

== See also ==
- African Charter on Human and Peoples' Rights
- International Day of the African Child
