= Minimum Age Convention, 1973 =

International Labour Organization Convention

C138, Minimum Age Convention, 1973
Convention Concerning Minimum Age for Admission to Employment
- Member states of the Convention. 16 15 14
- Drafted: 26 June 1973
- Effective: 19 June 1976
- Condition: 2 ratifications
- Ratifiers: 176
- Depositary: Director-General of the International Labour Office
- Languages: French and English

The ILO Convention Concerning Minimum Age for Admission to Employment C138, is a convention adopted in 1973 by the International Labour Organization. It requires ratifying states to pursue a national policy designed to ensure the effective abolition of child labour and to raise progressively the minimum age for admission to employment or work. It is one of eight ILO fundamental conventions. Convention C138 replaces several similar ILO conventions in specific fields of labour.

== Minimum ages ==
Countries are free to specify a minimum age for labour, with a minimum of 15 years. A declaration of 14 years is also possible when for a specified period of time. Laws may also permit light work for children aged 13–15 (not harming their health or school work). The minimum age of 18 years is specified for work which "is likely to jeopardise the health, safety or morals of young persons". Definitions of the type of work and derogations are only possible after tripartite consultations (if such a system exists in the ratifying country).

== Effect on other conventions ==
The convention is a revision of several conventions for workers in specific areas. Upon entry into force, some of these conventions were closed for ratification and becoming a party to this convention automatically resulted in denunciation of the older ones. An overview of older minimum age conventions of ILO is shown below:

ILO code	Field	conclusion date	entry into force	closure for signature/withdrawal	Parties (January 2023)	Denunciations (January 2023)	Revising convention(s)	Text and ratifications references
C5	Industry	28 November 1919	13 June 1921	N.A.	1	71	C59, this convention	
C7	Sea	7 July 1920	27 September 1921	19 June 2021	1	52	C58, this convention, MLC	
C10	Agriculture	16 November 1921	31 August 1923	N.A.	4	51	this convention	
C15	trimmers and stokers	11 November 1921	20 November 1922	N.A.	7	62	this convention	
C33	Non-Industrial Employment (revised)	30 April 1932	6 June 1935	29 December 1950	2	23	C60, this convention	
C58	Sea (revised)	24 October 1936	11 April 1939	N.A.	6	45	this convention, MLC	
C59	Industry (revised)	22 June 1937	21 February 1941	19 June 1976	8	28	this convention	
C60	Non-Industrial Employment	22 June 1937	29 December 1950	N.A.	0	11	this convention	
C112	Fishermen	19 June 1959	7 November 1961	N.A.	2	27	this convention, Work in Fishing Convention	
C123	Underground Work	22 June 1965	10 November 1967	N.A.	21	20	this convention	

== Ratifications ==
Minimum ages defined by states
1. 14 (32.0%)
2. 15 (43.0%)
3. 16 (25.0%)

ILO Convention C138 entered into force one year after deposition of the first two ratifications (Cuba and Libya). As of July 2023 176 countries have ratified Convention C138. Initially, however, the pace of ratification of this convention was extremely slow. Therefore, an alternative Convention with a more limited scope was initiated in 1999. It concerns ILO Convention 182 concerning the Prohibition and Immediate Action for the Elimination of the Worst Forms of Child Labour.

Convention C138 enters into force for a ratifying country one year after ratification. This can be denounced every 10 years in the year after 10 years have passed (e.g. 19 June 2027 – 19 June 2028).

The following countries have ratified this convention:
Country	Date	Minimum age (years)
Afghanistan	7 April 2010	14
Albania	16 February 1998	16
Algeria	30 April 1984	16
Angola	13 June 2001	14
Antigua and Barbuda	17 March 1983	16
Argentina	11 November 1996	14
Armenia	27 January 2006	16
Australia	13 June 2023	15
Austria	18 September 2000	15
Azerbaijan	19 May 1992	16
Bahamas	31 October 2001	14
Bahrain	7 March 2012	15
Bangladesh	22 March 2022	14
Barbados	4 January 2000	15
Belarus (as the Byelorussian Soviet Socialist Republic)	3 May 1979	16
Belgium	19 April 1988	15
Belize	6 March 2000	14
Benin	11 June 2001	14
Bolivia	11 June 1997	14
Bosnia and Herzegovina	2 June 1993	15
Botswana	5 June 1997	14
Brazil	28 June 2001	16
Brunei	17 June 2011	16
Bulgaria	23 April 1980	16
Burkina Faso	11 February 1999	15
Burundi	19 July 2000	16
Cambodia	23 August 1999	14
Cameroon	13 August 2001	14
Canada	8 June 2016	16
Cape Verde	7 February 2011	15
Central African Republic	28 June 2000	14
Chad	21 March 2005	14
Chile	1 February 1999	15
China	28 April 1999	16
Colombia	2 February 2001	14
Comoros	17 March 2004	15
Congo	26 November 1999	14
Costa Rica	11 June 1976	15
Côte d'Ivoire	7 February 2003	14
Croatia	8 October 1991	15
Cuba	7 March 1975	15
Cyprus	2 October 1997	15
Czech Republic	26 April 2007	15
Democratic Republic of the Congo	20 June 2001	14
Denmark	13 November 1997	15
Djibouti	14 June 2005	16
Dominica	27 September 1983	15
Dominican Republic	15 June 1999	14
Ecuador	19 September 2000	14
Egypt	9 June 1999	14
El Salvador	23 January 1996	14
Equatorial Guinea	12 June 1985	14
Eritrea	22 February 2000	14
Estonia	15 March 2007	15
Ethiopia	27 May 1999	14
Fiji	3 January 2003	15
Finland	13 January 1976	15
France	13 July 1990	16
Gabon	25 October 2010	16
Gambia	4 September 2000	14
Ghana	6 June 2011	15
Georgia	23 September 1996	15
Germany	8 April 1976	15
Greece	14 March 1986	15
Grenada	14 May 2003	16
Guatemala	27 April 1990	14
Guinea	6 June 2003	16
Guinea-Bissau	5 March 2009	14
Guyana	15 April 1998	15
Haiti	5 March 2009	14
Honduras	9 June 1980	14
Hungary	28 May 1998	16
Iceland	6 December 1999	15
India	13 June 2017	14
Indonesia	7 June 1999	15
Iraq	13 February 1985	15
Ireland	22 June 1978	16
Israel	21 June 1979	15
Italy	28 July 1981	15
Jamaica	13 October 2003	15
Japan	5 June 2000	15
Jordan	23 March 1998	16
Kazakhstan	18 May 2001	16
Kenya	9 April 1979	16
Kiribati	17 June 2009	14
South Korea	28 January 1999	15
Kuwait	15 November 1999	15
Kyrgyzstan	31 March 1992	16
Laos	13 June 2005	14
Latvia	2 June 2006	15
Lebanon	10 June 2003	14
Lesotho	14 June 2001	15
Liberia	13 June 2022	15
Libya	19 June 1975	15
Lithuania	22 June 1998	16
Luxembourg	24 March 1977	15
Macedonia	17 November 1991	15
Madagascar	31 May 2000	15
Malawi	19 November 1999	14
Malaysia	9 September 1997	15
Maldives	4 January 2013	16
Mali	11 March 2002	15
Malta	9 June 1988	16
Mauritania	3 December 2001	14
Mauritius	30 July 1990	15
Mexico	10 June 2015	15
Moldova	21 September 1999	16
Montenegro	3 June 2006	15
Mongolia	16 December 2002	15
Morocco	6 January 2000	15
Mozambique	16 June 2003	15
Myanmar	8 June 2020	14
Namibia	15 November 2000	14
Nepal	30 May 1997	14
Netherlands (European territory)	14 September 1976	15
Netherlands (Aruba)	18 February 1986	15
Nicaragua	2 November 1981	14
Niger	4 December 1978	14
Nigeria	2 October 2002	15
Norway	8 July 1980	15
Oman	21 July 2005	15
Pakistan	6 July 2006	14
Panama	31 October 2000	14
Papua New Guinea	2 June 2000	16
Paraguay	3 March 2004	14
Peru	13 November 2002	14
Philippines	4 June 1998	15
Poland	22 March 1978	15
Portugal	20 May 1998	16
Qatar	3 January 2006	16
Romania	19 November 1975	16
Russia (as the Soviet Union)	3 May 1979	16
Rwanda	15 April 1981	14
Saint Kitts and Nevis	3 June 2005	16
Saint Vincent and the Grenadines	25 July 2006	14
Samoa	29 October 2008	15
San Marino	1 February 1995	16
São Tomé and Príncipe	4 May 2005	14
Saudi Arabia	2 April 2014	15
Senegal	15 December 1999	15
Serbia (as Serbia and Montenegro)	24 November 2000	15
Seychelles	7 March 2000	15
Sierra Leone	13 June 2011	16
Singapore	7 November 2005	15
Slovakia	29 September 1997	15
Slovenia	29 May 1992	15
Solomon Islands	22 April 2013	14
South Africa	30 March 2000	16
South Sudan	29 April 2012	14
Spain	16 May 1977	16
Sri Lanka	11 February 2000	14
Sudan	7 March 2003	14
Suriname	15 January 2018	16
Swaziland	23 October 2002	15
Sweden	23 April 1990	15
Switzerland	17 August 1999	15
Syria	18 September 2001	15
Tajikistan	26 November 1993	16
Tanzania	16 December 1998	14
Thailand	11 May 2004	15
Togo	16 March 1984	14
Trinidad and Tobago	3 September 2004	16
Tunisia	19 October 1995	16
Turkey	30 October 1998	15
Turkmenistan	27 March 2012	16
Uganda	25 March 2003	14
Ukraine (as the Ukrainian Soviet Socialist Republic)	3 May 1979	16
United Arab Emirates	2 October 1998	15
United Kingdom	7 June 2000	16
Uruguay	2 June 1977	15
Uzbekistan	6 March 2009	15
Venezuela	15 July 1987	14
Vietnam	24 June 2003	15
Vanuatu	24 June 2019	14
Yemen	15 June 2000	14
Zambia	9 February 1976	15
Zimbabwe	6 June 2000	14
