= Index of children's rights articles =

Articles related to children's rights include:

== A ==
- Abandonment - when a parent, guardian, or person in charge of a child either deserts a child without any regard for the child's physical health, safety or welfare and with the intention of wholly abandoning the child, or in some instances, fails to provide necessary care for a child living under their roof.
- Adultcentrism - The exaggerated egocentrism of adults.
- Adultism - A predisposition towards adults, which some see as biased against children, youth, and all young people who aren't addressed or viewed as adults.
- ADHD - A persistent pattern of inattention and/or hyperactivity, as well as forgetfulness, poor impulse control or impulsivity, and distractibility.
- Age of consent - The minimum age at which a person is considered to be capable of legally giving informed consent to any contract or behaviour regulated by law with another person.
- Age of criminal responsibility - The age after which the defense of infancy is no longer an excuse.
- Age of majority - The threshold of adulthood as it is conceptualized in law.
- Anorexia nervosa - A psychiatric diagnosis that describes an eating disorder characterized by low body weight and body image distortion with an obsessive fear of gaining weight.

== B ==
- Best interests
- Breastfeeding
- Bullying

== C ==
- Children's Rights Education
- Child migration
- Child protection
- Child-selling
- Child soldiers
- Circumcision
- Child labor laws in the United States
- Child Labour

== D ==
- Decision making

== E ==
- Education
- Evolving capacities

== F ==
- Family rights
- Fathers' rights movement
- Fear of childbirth
- Fear of children
- Fetal rights
- Freedom of expression
- Freedom of speech
- Freedom of thought

== G ==
- Genital integrity
- Genital mutilation

== H ==
- Health care
- Healthy diet
- Homelessness

== I ==
- Incarceration
- Infanticide
- Infant oral mutilation, practiced in Africa
- International child abduction
- International child abduction in Brazil
- International child abduction in Japan
- International child abduction in Mexico
- International child abduction in the United States
- Inter-Agency Guiding Principles on Unaccompanied and Separated Children

== J ==
- Juvenile court

== M ==
- Maternity rights
- Military use of children

== P ==
- Parental alienation
- Parents' rights movement
- Paternity fraud
- Paternity rights
- Paternity testing
- Play
- Pregnant patients' rights

== R ==
- Reproductive rights
- Right to be heard
- Right to work
- Residential treatment center

== S ==
- Shaken baby syndrome
- Smoking
- Standard of living
- Student rights

== T ==
- Teen courts
- Teenage pregnancy
- Timeline of children's rights in the United States
- Trafficking of children
- Transnational child protection

== U ==
- Unaccompanied minor

== V ==
- Verdingkinder - Swiss children taken away from their impoverished parents, usually to work on farms as slave labor and often mistreated.

== Y ==
- Youth participation
- Youth rights
- Youth suicide
- Youth suffrage
- Youth voice
- Wage labour

== See also ==
- Children's rights movement
  - Timeline of children's rights in the United States
  - Timeline of children's rights in the United Kingdom
- Children's rights law
  - Child labor laws in the United States
- List of international and European law on child protection and migration
