= Unaccompanied minor =

Child without the presence of a legal guardian

An unaccompanied minor (sometimes "unaccompanied child" or "separated child") is a child without the presence of a legal guardian.

The UN Committee on the Rights of the Child defines unaccompanied minors and unaccompanied children as those "who have been separated from both parents and other relatives and are not being cared for by an adult who, by law or custom, is responsible for doing so." The Committee defines separated children as those "who have been separated from both parents, or from their previous legal or customary primary care-giver, but not necessarily from other relatives. These may, therefore, include children accompanied by other adult family members."

The number of unaccompanied minors increased drastically from 16,067 to 68,541 during 2011 to 2014.

== Immigration law ==
In immigration law unaccompanied minors, also known as separated children, are generally defined as foreign nationals or stateless persons below the age of 18, who arrive on the territory of a state unaccompanied by a responsible adult, and for as long as they are not effectively taken into care of such a person. It includes minors who are left unaccompanied after they entered the territory of state. A few countries have non-asylum procedures in place to adjudicate unaccompanied minor cases.

== Rights of unaccompanied minors ==
=== Aftercare and youth support ===
Unaccompanied children who have had difficult experiences often continue to need support upon turning 18, when they might lose the right to certain supports, including:

- a guardian or representative,
- the right to accommodation in a special home or in a foster family,
- child-specific social, economic and educational rights,
- the individual may be detained if their immigration status has not been regularised or when they have been ordered to leave the country.

Supporting the individual's transition into adulthood and independent life means integrating care arrangements and services as soon as possible. Aftercare is a core component of a durable solution, especially for adolescents. Life projects and aftercare plans are useful tools. The aftercare services available for national children deprived of parental care can guide caseworkers and officers in planning the support for the child's transition into adulthood.

After-care support is offered to young adults ageing out of care up to the age of 21 or 25 in some European countries, including to unaccompanied asylum seeking children turning 18. Some countries extend the young person's stay in reception homes for children until appropriate accommodation is found.

=== Family reunification in the country of destination ===
Family reunification is a core component of a durable solution for an unaccompanied child, wherever this is in the best interests of the child. Family reunification could take place in the country of destination or origin, or in a third country. Caseworkers and officers should inform unaccompanied children about the possibilities and procedures for family reunification. The child should have access to support when applying for family reunification.

As part of the best interests’ determination, caseworkers and officers assess if family reunification is in the best interests of the child. Preparation for and monitoring of a family reunification prevents and reduces emotional distress for the child. When family reunification would mean risks for the child, alternative care arrangements are considered and the best interests of the child to maintain family relations and active contact are assessed.

The child's rights to life, survival and safety outweighs the child's interests to reunite with the family in the country of origin. Family reunification cannot take place in the child's country of origin if the immigration authorities in the country of destination grant international protection to the child. In these cases, children have a right to family reunification in the country of destination or a third country. When the child's application for international protection is rejected, concerns about the child's safety can still rule out a return to the country of origin for family reunification. This might be because of a high level of general violence that pose risks to the child.

=== Right to consular assistance ===
Children who are outside of their country of residence have a right to assistance by embassies and consular offices representing their country. Consular staff can play an important role in supporting and assisting children abroad, establishing supportive contacts and referral, and mobilising help. Consular staff may contact central authorities or national contact points for technical advice in cases involving children. Under the 1963 Vienna Convention on Consular Relations of the United Nations, consular functions include helping and assisting nationals of the sending state. This could involve measures to safeguard the interests of children who are nationals of the sending State within the limits imposed by the laws and regulations of the receiving State, particularly when a guardian needs to be appointed. The authorities of the country of destination must inform the competent consular office without delay when the appointment of a guardian for a child is considered. The laws and regulations of the receiving State concerning the appointment of a guardian apply and are not affected by the information sharing with the relevant consular offices.

== Resettlement and transfers ==
=== Resettlement and integration in a third country ===
When the best interests’ determination process concludes there is no durable solution for a child in the country of destination or origin, the possibility of resettlement to a third country is assessed. Resettlement might be an option when it enables safe family reunification in the resettlement country, or when it protects a child from refoulement or persecution or other serious human rights violations in the country of destination. This might be the case when a child victim of trafficking has to be protected from reprisals or renewed recruitment by traffickers. Unless it poses any risks to the child, the child’s parents need to be informed, consulted and heard in the assessment and resettlement process.

Before a decision on resettlement is taken, the best interests’ determination process considers the following, with reference to articles under the UN Convention on the Rights of the Child:

- The duration of legal or other obstacles to a child's return to her or his home country;
- The child's age, sex/gender, emotional state, educational and family background;
- The child's right to preserve her or his identity, including nationality and name (Article 8);
- The continuity in a child's upbringing and care, including with regard to the child's ethnic, religious, cultural and linguistic background (Article 20);
- The right of the child to preserve her or his family relations (Article 8) and related short, mid- and long-term possibilities of family reunification either in the home, host or resettlement country.

When resettlement is explored for family reunification purposes, the child and the family member located in the third country need to consent and want to reunify. The child welfare or social services authorities in the country of resettlement make assessments and ensure service provision and monitoring after resettlement.

When resettlement is explored for other reasons, the assessments consider whether resettlement could pose any obstacles to family tracing, family reunification or maintaining family relations and contacts, including the distance between the place of resettlement and the child's family and the existing communication possibilities.

=== Transfers in Europe under the Dublin III Council Regulation ===
The Dublin III Council Regulation is an agreement among EU Member States, Iceland, Liechtenstein, Norway and Switzerland that regulates which country is responsible for examining a person's asylum application. It provides for the possibility to transfer persons to the responsible state. The Regulation assumes that the Common European Asylum System is in place and fully operational. Under this precondition, adults and children could be transferred to another participating State without compromising the right of the person to international protection with appropriate standards of reception and care. Transfer is only allowed when the first instance decision on the previous application has not yet been taken.

The Dublin III Council Regulation provides that the best interests of the child should be a primary consideration of Member States when applying the Regulation, in accordance with the Convention on the Rights of the Child and the Charter of Fundamental Rights of the European Union. The Regulation requires Member States that are assessing the best interests of the child to:

- Take due account of the child's well-being, social development, safety and security, and background;
- Take into account the views of the child in accordance with her or his age and maturity;
- Develop specific procedural guarantees for unaccompanied children with due consideration to their particular vulnerability;
- Cooperate closely between Member States for conducting best interests’ assessments under the Regulation.

The identification and location of family members can affect which Member State is responsible for processing the asylum application of an unaccompanied minor:

- The Member State where a family member or a sibling of the child is legally present is responsible, provided that it is in the best interests of the child to have her or his application assessed in that state.
- When a relative is legally present in another Member State, an assessment establishes if the relative can take care of the child. When that is possible, the child is united with the relative if this is in her or his best interests. That Member State becomes responsible.
- When family members and relatives are in different Member States, the decision on which Member State is responsible is guided by the best interests of the child.
- When family members or relatives cannot be identified, the Member State responsible shall be that where the unaccompanied child has lodged the asylum application, if this is in the best interests of the child.
- Some discretion is allowed in this decision with the applicant's consent, including for family reunification for humanitarian or cultural reasons.

The process for determining the Member State responsible shall start as soon as an asylum application is lodged. Once a Member State receives a request to take charge of an applicant, the decision shall be taken within a period of two months. In particularly complex cases, this term may be extended by one additional month.

When requesting another state to take charge of or receive a person back, Member States gets written consent to transmit information about the applicant, including information about the immediate needs of the applicant and contact details of family members, relatives or other family relations in the Member State to which the persons is transferred. For children, this includes information about the child's education and age assessment. The applicant has a right to be informed about the data that is processed and is entitled to have the data corrected or erased when incomplete or incorrect. For unaccompanied children, caseworkers and officers ensure that the child receives support.

The applicant has the right to an effective remedy against decisions taken under the Regulation in the form of appeal or review, before a court or a tribunal, including the right to legal assistance and interpretation. The transfer is automatically suspended during the appeal or review of a decision, and the applicant has a right to remain in the Member State pending the outcome. The responsibility of the Member State ceases when there is evidence to ascertain that the person concerned has left the territory for at least three months. After this period, the person has to lodge a new application for asylum.

== Return ==
The best interests’ determination decides if returning the child to his or her country of origin is in the best interests of the child. Sustainable returns are rights-based and child-centred. Before the return, the authorities of the destination country ensure the child will be received in safe care and looked after. Some assessments of the best interests' determination may be updated. An incomplete best interests’ determination may give the child grounds to appeal the decision on her or his best interests.

=== Pre-return preparations ===
Thorough preparations for return ensure returns are dignified, safe and rights-based. A return can be a positive experience, especially if the plan for return is sustainable. Children and young people can be better prepared to lead an independent life as adults gain an income if provided training relevant to the country of origin in life and social skills, academic and professional training, as well as entrepreneurial skills and negotiating capacities. Returnees may need support in becoming literate in the language of the country and community to which they return.

When return is considered to be in the best interests of the child, an individual return and reintegration plan prepares for settlement, reintegration and follow-up monitoring, and determine the needs of the child and corresponding support services. Continuity of the care arrangements and support services for the child from the country of destination to the country of return is a priority, including:

- Continuity of education and vocational training: when returned to the country of origin before graduating from school or vocational training, the child should receive certificates of any education that the child has completed in the country of destination. It may be in the best interests' of the child to complete his or her schooling before being returned.
- Continuity of health services and medical treatment: the child should have access to the same or alternative health care and treatment that the child regularly accessed in the country of destination.
- Continuity of guardianship arrangements: continuity of guardianship should be ensured when the child is not returned to her or his parents or primary caregivers.

Pre-return counselling, including psycho-social counselling, can help the returnee deal with distress and concern that may arise even when the return it is considered to be in the best interests of the child. Counseling can help the child to gain confidence and to feel safe and empowered about her or his return and options after the return.

=== Transportation phase ===
Unaccompanied children who are returned after receiving a negative decision on their asylum application and who participate in a programme for ‘voluntary assisted return’ are usually escorted during the journey to the country of return. An escort ensures the child arrives safely and is met by the responsible authorities and guardian or caregiver.

=== Post-return and reintegration phase ===
Post-return support programmes protect the young returnees, ensure that their rights are protected, and make returns sustainable. They can help make return a positive, constructive and successful experience. The cooperation authorities of the countries of destination and return cooperate ensure ongoing provision of quality care, support and assistance to the young returnees, including counselling services. The cross-border team monitors and evaluates return programmes, particularly the reintegration support, the appropriateness and sustainability of the measures.

Monitoring and evaluation considers the views of the returnees, ensures periodic review. It allows for adjustments of care arrangements and support services to ensure the returned child's human rights of the child and guiding principles of quality care for children, continuity of care, safety and the right of the child to life, survival and development are upheld. National child protection systems and referral mechanisms can ensure monitoring takes place and the findings are taken into account to inform prompt adjustments. The following aspects are evaluated:

- The quality of interactions between officials and service providers and the returnee, in countries of origin and destination;
- The quality of preparations and the information and counselling available to the child prior to return;
- The conditions in waiting and detention areas, if applicable;
- The files of returnees and the transparency and quality of documentation they provide;
- The continuity of services of care, protection, health and education as well as guardianship, where applicable;
- The quality of childcare and the child's relations to parents or other caregivers;
- The social and economic situation of the returnee, the support available to her or his transition into adulthood and independent life and the child's integration in the community after return;
- The possibility for child returnees to access reporting and complaints mechanisms that support them in claiming their rights after return.

=== European private law on returning children ===
The Brussels II bis Regulation regulates parental responsibilities in transnational cases. It guides caseworkers and officers who are considering protection measures in cross-border cases involving children who are EU nationals. Contacts should be made with the child's home country authorities, who provide information on the situation of the child, the parents and any official decisions or actions concerning parental responsibility or other relevant matters. While the Regulation applies primarily to civil law matters concerning the parental abduction of children and parental responsibility, it is also being applied for the protection and return of EU migrant children, including children living on the streets or involved in street based activities and those at risk of or exposed to exploitation and trafficking.

The Brussels II bis Regulation mirrors some of the provisions afforded under the Conventions of the Hague Conference on Private International Law, in particular the Hague Convention of 25 October 1980 on the Civil Aspects of International Child Abduction. In addition to individual EU Member States, the European Union is also a Member of the Hague Conference on Private International Law and acceded to some of the more recent Hague Conventions. The Hague Conventions are routinely applied in transnational civil law cases concerning children, particularly in matters of international adoption, parental child abduction and parental responsibility, as well as the placement of children across borders. The procedures established under the Hague Conventions could also be used for the protection of migrant children and the return of children to their countries of habitual residence.

When children are returned in international family law cases, the central authority of the returning state manages the return. The mandate of a central authority who arranges for the return of a child ends usually when the child arrives in the country of habitual residence. Follow-up services are provided after return, including by the International Social Service. National branches of the International Social Service can provide support with the practical arrangements for the child's return to the country of habitual residence, translation of social evaluation reports and providing expert opinions prior to the return and in follow-up.

== Alternatives to immigration detention ==
The UN Convention on the Rights of the Child provides that "no child shall be deprived of his or her liberty unlawfully or arbitrarily. The arrest, detention or imprisonment of a child shall be in conformity with the law and shall be used only as a measure of last resort and for the shortest appropriate period of time". These rights apply also to the context of the detention of unaccompanied or separated children: "Unaccompanied or separated children should not, as a general rule, be detained. Detention cannot be justified solely on the basis of the child being unaccompanied or separated, or on their migratory or residence status, or lack thereof." Depriving children of their liberty for immigration matters constitutes a violation of their human rights.

The conditions of immigration detention are rarely appropriate for children, especially when detention is ordered for extensive periods of time. In immigration detention, children often face challenges in accessing education, appropriate health services, adequate food and accommodation and may have limited opportunities for leisure time and recreational activities. Detention is a highly distressing experience, especially for migrants and asylum seekers. It has a harmful impact on the mental health, well-being and development of children. The experience of detention can cause or exacerbate previous traumatisation. In some cases, migrant children are detained together with their families to prevent family separation in cases where parents are being detained for immigration matters. When it is in the best interests of the child to remain with her or his parents, alternatives to detention can be considered for the whole family.

Alternatives to detention include registration and reporting requirements, deposit of documents, bond or bail, designated residence, case management or supervised release, supervision in the community, electronic monitoring, home curfew or house arrest. Countries that work with alternatives to detention have made positive experience and noted that these alternatives work in practice. Asylum seekers usually comply with the requirements imposed upon them in the context of alternative measures to detention. The intention is that the control of the returnees through detention is replaced by a process of management and supervision with respect to the human rights of the persons concerned, which is also more cost-effective for the state.

The minimum standards for detaining migrant children, as described by the Committee on the Rights of the Child, are:

- The deprivation of liberty of migrant children, accompanied or not, should be temporary and for the shortest period possible.
- Migration-related detention centres should be separate from prisons and should not bear similarities to prison-like conditions.
- Centres where child detention takes place should have child protection officials specifically trained in the care and protection of children.
- Children and adolescents should be separated from adults unless it is considered to be in their best interests. Centres should ensure the opportunity for regular contact with family members and friends.
- Centres must ensure regular and confidential contact with legal and consular representatives.
- While staying in a detention centre, even temporarily, children should be guaranteed the full enjoyment of economic and social rights such as education, health care, recreation, food, water and clothing.
- The provision of independent mechanisms for inspecting and monitoring the detention facilities conditions, including by independent bodies.

== Trends by country ==
Most European have experienced an increase in unaccompanied minors. The majority of minors are male, between 15 and 18 years, from Afghanistan, Iraq, Western and Central Africa and Somalia. Most apply for asylum after arriving in the receiving country.

=== Germany ===
An institute of forensic medicine in Münster determined the age of 594 of unaccompanied minors in 2019 and found that 234 (40%) were likely 18 years or older and would therefore be processed as adults by authorities. The sample was predominantly males from Afghanistan, Guinea, Algeria and Eritrea.

=== Russia ===
An unaccompanied minor with Russian nationality will need to have his/her own passport, a visa (when the destination requires one), and a notarized statement in Russian from both parents confirming that they consent to the child leaving the country unaccompanied.

=== Spain ===
In Spain most cases of unaccompanied children fall under the non-asylum procedure.

=== Sweden ===
In Sweden, an estimated 8% of unaccompanied minors (up to the age of 21) use narcotics.

=== United States ===
Unaccompanied Minors Apprehended by US Border Patrol on the Mexican Border
Country of Origin	FY 2013	FY 2014	FY 2015	FY 2016	FY 2017
El Salvador	5,990	16,404	9,389	17,512	9,143
Guatemala	8,068	17,057	13,589	18,913	14,827
Honduras	6,747	18,244	5,409	10,468	7,784
Mexico	17,240	15,634	11,012	11,926	8,877
Total				59,692	41,435
Fiscal years begin on October 1 of the prior year. Source:

In the United States, in addition to asylum, certain vulnerable unaccompanied minors may be eligible for a T visa (trafficking victim), U visa (victims of crime), or Special Immigrant Juvenile status (abused, neglected, or abandoned child).

== Fake minors ==
Around two-thirds of asylum seekers in the UK (for the year before September 2015) who had their age disputed were found to likely be over 18.

In Sweden, 2481 cases where the individual was suspected to be above 18 was submitted and out of those, 2002 were assessed as being 18 or older. In 25 of those, it was judged as "possibly" and in 432, "may be". The Swedish government decided to implement age tests only in 2016, and actual testing started in 2017. There were 1481 age tests made with “unaccompanied child migrants” in Sweden (during March–June 2017), and in 1215 cases the age examinations concluded that their age is above 18 years. The method has around a 10% failure rate and when a second opinion is made, the result differs in 85% of the cases.

== See also ==
- Children's rights
- Convention on the Rights of the Child
- Child labour
- Child migration
- Child trafficking
- Commercial sexual exploitation of children
- Convention on the Rights of the Child
- International child abduction
- Palermo protocols
- Right to be heard
- Trafficking of children
- Unaccompanied Alien Children
- Unaccompanied asylum-seeking children in the United Kingdom
- United Nations Global Initiative to Fight Human Trafficking
