= Unaccompanied Refugee Minors Program =

An Unaccompanied Refugee Minor (URM) is any person who has not attained 18 years of age who entered the United States unaccompanied by and not destined to: (a) a parent, (b) a close non-parental adult relative who is willing and able to care for said minor, or (c) an adult with a clear and court-verifiable claim to custody of the minor; and who has no parents in the United States. Initially, only unaccompanied refugee children were included under this program, but it was later expanded to include unaccompanied asylees, special immigrant juveniles, Cuban and Haitian entrants, U- and T-status recipients, and Afghan and Ukrainian parolees.

The URM program is coordinated by the U.S. Office of Refugee Resettlement (ORR), a branch of the United States Administration for Children and Families. The mission of the URM program is to help people in need "develop appropriate skills to enter adulthood and to achieve social self-sufficiency." To do this, URM provides minors under the program with the same social services available to U.S.-born children, including, but not limited to, housing, food, clothing, medical care, educational support, counseling, and support for social integration.

== History ==
URM was established in 1980 as a result of the legislative branch's enactment of the Refugee Act that same year. Initially, it was developed to "address the needs of thousands of children in Southeast Asia" who were displaced due to civil unrest and economic problems resulting from the aftermath of the Vietnam War, which had ended only five years earlier. In coordination with the United Nations, President Jimmy Carter doubled the number of refugees from Southeast Asia who were allowed to enter the United States each month. The URM was established, in part, to deal with the influx of refugee children.

URM was established in 1980, but the emergence of refugee minors as an issue in the United States since at least World War II. Since that time, oppressive regimes and U.S. military involvement have consistently "contributed to both the creation of a notable supply of unaccompanied refugee children eligible to relocate to the United States, as well as a growth in public pressure on the federal government to provide assistance to these children."

Since 1980, the demographic makeup of children within URM has shifted from being largely Southeast Asian to being much more diverse. Between 1999 and 2005, children from 36 different countries were inducted into the program. Over half of the children who entered the program within this same time period came from Sudan, and less than 10% came from Southeast Asia.

== Administration ==
The URM program is administered at the state level with federal funding. The state refugee coordinator provides financial and programmatic oversight to the URM programs in their state, ensures that unaccompanied minors in URM programs receive the same benefits and services as other children in out-of-home care in the state, and oversees the needs of unaccompanied minors with many other stakeholders.

ORR contracts with two faith-based agencies to manage the URM program in the United States; Lutheran Immigration and Refugee Service (LIRS) and the United States Conference of Catholic Bishops (USCCB). These agencies identify eligible children in need of URM services; determine appropriate placements for children among their national networks of affiliated agencies; and conduct training, research and technical assistance on URM services. They also provide the social services such as: indirect financial support for housing, food, clothing, medical care and other necessities; intensive case management by social workers; independent living skills training; educational supports; English language training; career/college counseling and training; mental health services; assistance adjusting immigration status; cultural activities; recreational opportunities; support for social integration; and cultural and religious preservation.

The 14 states that participate in the URM program include: Arizona, California, Colorado, Florida, Massachusetts, Michigan, Mississippi, North Dakota, New York, Pennsylvania, Texas, Utah, Virginia, Washington state, and Washington D.C.

== Adoption of URM Children ==
Although they are in the United States without the protection of their family, URM-designated children are not generally eligible for adoption. This is due in part to the Hague Convention on the Protection and Co-Operation in Respect of Inter-Country Adoption. Created in 1993, the Hague Convention established international standards for inter-country adoption. In order to protect against the abduction, sale, or trafficking of children, these standards protect the rights of the biological parents of all children. Children in the URM program have become separated from their biological parents and the ability to find and gain parental release of URM children is often extremely difficult. Most children, therefore, are not adopted. They are served primarily through the foster care system of the participating states. Most will be in the custody of the state (typically living with a foster family) until they become adults. Reunification with the child's family is encouraged whenever possible.

== Notable URMs ==
Perhaps the most commonly known group to enter the United States through the URM program was known as the "Lost Boys" of Sudan. Their story was made into a documentary by Megan Mylan and Jon Shenk. The film, Lost Boys of Sudan, follows two Sudanese refugees on their journey from Africa to America. It won an Independent Spirit Award and earned two national Emmy nominations.
