= Right to be heard =

The term right to be heard refers to

- audi alteram partem, the legal principle that no person should be judged without a fair hearing
- children's participation in a legal proceeding relating to them.

== See also ==
- right to a fair trial
