= Best interests =

Child rights principle

Best interests or best interests of the child is a child rights principle, which derives from Article 3 of the UN Convention on the Rights of the Child, which says that "in all actions concerning children, whether undertaken by public or private social welfare institutions, courts of law, administrative authorities or legislative bodies, the best interests of the child shall be a primary consideration". Assessing the best interests of a child means to evaluate and balance "all the elements necessary to make a decision in a specific situation for a specific individual child or group of children".

== Definition ==
According to the UN Convention on the Rights of the Child, assessing the best interests of a child means to evaluate and balance "all the elements necessary to make a decision in a specific situation for a specific individual child or group of children". Due to the diversity of factors to consider, usually more than one profession or institution is involved in the assessment process, bringing together various perspectives and areas of expertise from the country of origin and destination and, in particular, the perspective of the child.

The following aspects are relevant for the best interests of the child:

- The child's views and aspirations;
- The identity of the child, including age and gender, personal history and background;
- The care, protection and safety of the child;
- The child's well-being;
- The family environment, family relations and contact;
- Social contacts of the child with peers and adults;
- Situations of vulnerability, i.e. the risks that the child is facing and the sources of protection, resiliency and empowerment;
- The child's skills and evolving capacities;
- The rights and needs with regard to health and education;
- The development of the child and her or his gradual transition into adulthood and an independent life;
- Any other specific needs of the child.

== Assessments ==
Best interests' assessments can be conducted informally and ad hoc or as formalised processes. Assessments look at everyday matters and decisions with more or less severe implications for the child. The best interests of a child may change significantly over time as children grow and their situations and capacities evolve, so their best interests may need to be reassessed periodically.

== Determinations ==
Best interests determinations are formal processes conducted with the involvement of public authorities and professional decision makers. The objective of the best interests determination is to reach a decision based on national law that safeguards the rights of the child and promotes her or his well-being, safety and development. Decision-makers weigh and balance all the relevant factors of the case, giving due consideration to all the rights of the child and the obligations of public authorities and service providers towards the child. The objective of the best interests determination process is the identification of a durable solution. Best interests determinations are carried out when the issues at stake are expected to have significant implications on the child's present and future life.

== Elements of a best interests assessment and determination process in transnational cases ==
Best interests assessments aim to gather all the facts needed to arrive at a conclusion about the impact of any action, measure or decision on the child and her or his future. The central perspective is that of the girl or boy concerned. A trust-based relationship and communicating effectively in the child's main language enables the child to exercise his or her right to be heard. Comprehensive assessments involve a multi-disciplinary team of qualified professionals.

A comprehensive best interests assessment and determination process addresses all of the following:

- Establishing the child's identity and the identity of the child guardian and the quality of their relations, and any accompanying persons in transnational cases.
- Case assessment, including the following components:
  - Hearing the child;
  - Assessment of the child's situation, background and needs;
  - Social situation and family assessment;
  - Gathering evidence including through forensic examinations and interviews with the child;
  - Risk and security assessments;
  - Mapping sources of support, skills, potentials and resources for empowerment;
- Developing a life project.
- Comprehensive child impact assessment of any potential decisions.
- Identification of a durable solution in transnational cases.
- Continued assessments during the implementation of the durable solution with due follow-up, review and monitoring, and adjustments to the durable solution arrangements, if and as required, according to the best interests of the child

== Procedural safeguards in best interests determinations ==
Procedural safeguards and documentation in best interests determinations include:

- The right of the child to express her or his views and to have them taken into account: In a judicial or administrative procedure, children have the right to be heard and to have their views taken into account.
  - The process of hearing the child needs to be documented, with a clear description of how the child's views are balanced against other views and other information sources. The communication with the child has to be effective and child-sensitive and might require quality interpretation and cultural mediation. In cases of unaccompanied or separated children, the role of the guardian or representative is essential to facilitate the communication between the child and the authorities.
  - The child has a right to a hearing when the decision-making body is a court. The hearing should be held without delay in a child-sensitive way and prevent secondary victimisation of child victims and witnesses in judicial proceedings.
  - The child's age, gender and background, the child's level of development and evolving capacities should be considered.
  - Child-friendly information in a language that the child understands, enabling the child to form an opinion and to express her or his views should be provided.
  - In transnational cases, children who do not speak the language of the country of destination have a right to translation and interpretation. Interpretation should be made available free of charge and with a neutral bearing when interpreters are directly involved.
- Guardianship and representation: children have a right to an independent representative or guardian who is competent and equipped to represent and promote the best interests of the child.
- Legal representation: When the best interests of a child are formally decided by a court or other competent body, the child is entitled to legal representation, legal information and defence, including for children applying for asylum or special protection as victims of crime.
- Legal reasoning: Decisions need to be documented, motivated in detail, justified and explained, including how the decision is considered to relate to the best interests of the child and how the underlying considerations have been balanced to arrive at the decision.
- Mechanisms to review or revise decisions: Formal mechanisms have to be in place to reopen or review decisions on the best interests of a child. Children need access to support in accessing and using these mechanisms. It has to be clearly established when a case or decision can be reopened or reviewed, as for instance when there is new evidence or when the authorities have not been able to implement the first decision.
- Right to appeal: Best interests determinations are subject to legal remedies. Children need to have access and support, such as legal assistance and representation, to appeal a decision. During the appeal procedure the implementation is suspended. For decisions concerning transfer or return of a child to another county, sufficient time must be available between the decision and the execution of the decision, to enable the child to hand in an appeal or request a review of the decision.

== Balancing rights and interests in best interests determinations ==
The different elements considered in an assessment and determination of the best interests of a child may appear to be competing or in contradiction. Potential conflicts are solved on a case-by-case basis. The right of the child to have her or his best interests taken as a primary consideration means that the child's interests have high priority and are not just one of several considerations. A larger weight is attached to what serves the child best:

- The possibility of harm outweighs other factors;
- The child's right to be brought up by her or his parents is a fundamental principle;
- A child's best interests can generally best be met with her or his family, except where there are safety concerns;
- The survival and development of the child are generally ensured best by remaining in or maintaining close contacts with the family and the child's social and cultural networks;
- Matters related to health, education and vulnerability are important factors; and
- Continuity and stability of the child's situation are important.

== Criticism ==
The definition of the best interests of the child is not straightforward in either legal practice or when formulating laws and conventions. Its implementation has received considerable criticism by some child psychologists, epidemiologists and the family law reform movement, particularly with regard to how it often marginalizes children from one of their parents after divorce or separation, even though children benefit from close contact with both parents. It has been argued that the current standard should be replaced with a best interests of the child from the perspective of the child approach that takes child-focused epidemiological and psychological research into account regarding children's physical, mental and social well-being after divorce or separation.

The best interests standard is often better suited to identifying the best of several acceptable alternatives and has less value in determining which alternatives should be deemed acceptable. Alternative models include deferring to parents or guardians when the decision falls into the zone of parental discretion (parents or guardians make choices that others consider suboptimal, but which seem better to the decision-makers and have little potential for serious harm) and the harm principle, which requires outside intervention to prevent serious harm. For example, one custody situation might be considered optimally in the best interests of the child, but a slightly different arrangement might fall into the zone of parental discretion. However, a situation that would put the child into serious danger would violate the harm principle and therefore be rejected.

== European Union ==
Reference to the best interests of the child has been introduced into relevant EU laws and policies, including in the context of migration, asylum, trafficking and potential return. The wording attached to the best interests principle ranges between the imperative must and shall to the less prescriptive should.

== Finland ==
The Finnish Child Welfare Act provides that the best interests of the child needs to be a primary consideration in the determination of welfare measures in response to the child's needs. The Act defines the key elements that need to be taken into consideration for a best interests determination:

1. Balanced development and well-being, close and continuing human relationships;
2. The opportunity to be given understanding and affection, as well as supervision and care in line with the child's age and level of development;
3. An education consistent with the child's abilities and wishes;
4. A safe environment in which to grow up, and physical and emotional freedom;
5. A sense of responsibility in becoming independent and growing up;
6. The opportunity to become involved in matters affecting the child and to influence them; and
7. The need to take account of the child's linguistic, cultural and religious background.

This provision offers legally binding guidance to professionals on how the concept of the best interests of the child should be understood. It raises awareness of the complexity of the issues under consideration and makes reference to important rights of the child such as the right to education and development, safety and well-being, respect for the child's views and the child's cultural and other backgrounds.

== United States ==
Since the US has not yet ratified the UN Convention on the Rights of the Child, which is the central instrument defining and providing the right of the best interests of the child for much of the world, a different set of laws, precedents, and applications apply.

=== History ===
The use of the best interests doctrine represented a 20th-century shift in public policy. The best interests doctrine is an aspect of parens patriae, and in the United States it has replaced the tender years doctrine, which rested on the basis that children are not resilient, and almost any change in a child's living situation would be detrimental to their well-being.

Until the early 1900s, fathers were given custody of the children in case of divorce. Many U.S. states then shifted from this standard to one that completely favored the mother as the primary caregiver. In the 1970s, the tender years doctrine was replaced by the best interests of the child as determined by family courts. Because many family courts continued to give great weight to the traditional role of the mother as the primary caregiver, application of this standard in custody historically tended to favor the mother of the children.

The "best interests of the child" doctrine is sometimes used in cases where non-parents, such as grandparents, ask a court to order non-parent visitation with a child. Some parents, usually those who are not awarded custody, say that using the "best interests of the child" doctrine in non-parent visitation cases fails to protect a fit parent's fundamental right to raise their child in the manner they see fit. Troxel v Granville, 530 US 57; 120 S Ct 2054; 147 LEd2d 49 (2000).

=== Child welfare laws ===
The "best interest of the child" doctrine is largely seen in child welfare laws and the paramount consideration of the court when making decisions with regards to abused and neglected children. The Adoption Assistance and Child Welfare Act of 1980 requires that, "…each child has a case plan designed to achieve placement in the least restrictive (most family like) setting available and in close proximity to the parents' home, consistent with the best interest and special needs of the child." Although the statute does not define the "best interest of the child", best interest is referenced in two other sections. Moreover, several states have chosen to statutorily define or reference the "best interest of the child", and require the courts within those jurisdictions to consider specific factors.

=== Family law ===
The term is used as doctrine used by courts to determine a wide range of issues relating to the well-being of children. In the application of family law, one of the most common of these issues concern questions that arise upon the divorce or separation of the children's parents. Examples include:

- With whom will the children live?
- How much contact (previously termed "access" or, in some jurisdictions, "visitation") will the parents, legal guardian, or other parties be allowed (or required) to have?
- To whom and by whom will child support be paid and in what amount?

In proceedings involving divorce or the dissolution of a common-law marriage or a civil union, family courts are directed to assess the best interests of any children of these unions. However, this doctrine is not used to settle custody matters involving urban and minority residents in cities such as Philadelphia, Pennsylvania, for example, where the tender years doctrine is still in effect.

The determination is also used in proceedings which determine legal obligations and entitlements, such as when a child is born outside of marriage, when grandparents assert rights with respect to their grandchildren, and when biological parents assert rights with respect to a child who was given up for adoption.

It is the doctrine usually employed in cases regarding the potential emancipation of minors. Courts will use this doctrine when called upon to determine who should make medical decisions for a child where the parents disagree with healthcare providers or other authorities.

In determining the best interests of the child or children in the context of a separation of the parents, the court may order various investigations to be undertaken by social workers, Family Court Advisors from CAFCASS, psychologists and other forensic experts, to determine the living conditions of the child and his custodial and non-custodial parents. Such issues as the stability of the child's life, links with the community, and stability of the home environment provided by each parent may be considered by a court in deciding the child's residency in custody and visitation proceedings. In English law, section 1(1) Children Act 1989 makes the interests of any child the paramount concern of the court in all proceedings and, having indicated in s1(2) that delay is likely to prejudice the interests of any child, it requires the court to consider the "welfare checklist", i.e. the court must consider:

1. The ascertainable wishes and feelings of each child concerned (considered in light of their age and understanding)
2. Physical, emotional and/or educational needs now and in the future
3. The likely effect on any change in the circumstances now and in the future
4. Age, sex, background and any other characteristics the court considers relevant
5. Any harm suffered or at risk of suffering now and in the future
6. How capable each parent, and other person in relation to whom the court considers the question to be relevant, is of meeting the child's needs
7. The range of powers available to the court under the Children Act 1989 in the proceedings in question

The welfare checklist considers the needs, wishes and feelings of the child and young person and this analysis is vital to ensure that the human rights of children are always in the forefront of all consideration. The welfare checklist provides a comprehensive list of issues that need to be considered to ensure that young people who come into court proceedings are safeguarded fully and their rights as citizens are promoted.

=== Immigration law ===
To a much lesser degree the principal of the "best interest of the child" has been utilized in immigration law as it relates to child migrants.

== See also ==
- Children's rights
- Child custody
- Child labour
- Child migration
- Commercial sexual exploitation of children
- Convention on the Rights of the Child
- International child abduction
- Palermo protocols
- Right to be heard
- Shared parenting
- Trafficking of children
- United Nations Global Initiative to Fight Human Trafficking
- Unaccompanied minor
