= Unaccompanied asylum-seeking children in the United Kingdom =

Children seeking asylum status in the UK, without parents and guardians

Unaccompanied asylum-seeking children in the United Kingdom, often abbreviated to UASC, are children who are outside their country of origin to seek asylum in the United Kingdom, are separated from parents and relatives, and are not in the care of someone who is responsible for doing so.

== Definitions ==
Since unaccompanied asylum-seeking children are an international concern, there are several different definitions that apply to them within the UK.

The United Nations defines unaccompanied children as "children, as defined in article 1 of the Convention, who have been separated from both parents and other relatives and are not being cared for by an adult who, by law or custom, is responsible for doing so." The United Nations defines separated children, a closely related group, as "children, as defined in article 1 of the Convention, who have been separated from both parents, or from their previous legal or customary primary caregiver, but not necessarily from other relatives. These may therefore, include children being accompanied by adult family members."

The UK Home Office defines unaccompanied asylum-seeking child as "a person under 18, or who, in the absence of documentary evidence establishing age, appears to be under that age, is applying for asylum in his or her own right and has no relative or guardian in the United Kingdom."

All asylum-seekers in the UK are seeking refugee status. The UK abides by the UN definition of a refugee when determining refugee status. The UN defines a refugee as a person who 'owing to a well-founded fear of being persecuted for reasons of race, religion, nationality, membership of a particular social group or political opinion, is outside the country of his nationality and is unable or, owing to such fear, is unwilling to avail himself of the protection of that country.

== Statistics ==
The number of unaccompanied asylum-seeking children entering Great Britain varies from year to year. The first table below shows the number of total applications for asylum received each year from 2006-2011 while the second table shows the same data for the years 2023, 2024, 2025.

Year	Total applications
2006	3,451
2007	3,645
2008	4,285
2009	3,174
2010	1,717
2011	1,398

Year	Total applications
2023	67,337
2024	84,200
2025	88,700

UASC come from all over the world, but as of 2025, the top five countries of origin of people seeking asylum were Pakistan, Afghanistan, Iran, Bangladesh, and Syria.

=== Gender disparity ===
Far more male unaccompanied asylum-seeking children enter the UK than female unaccompanied asylum-seeking children. This gap can be seen when the 2006-2011 applications are broken down by gender.

Year	Total male applications	Total female applications
2006	2,585	863
2007	2,938	705
2008	3,753	529
2009	2,809	360
2010	1,398	315
2011	1,149	247

This male predominance continues to the present day, with males accounting for approximately 80–85% of UASC applicants, attributed to higher risks faced by males in conflict zones and migration journeys, as well as gender-specific vulnerabilities and migration patterns.

=== Adults posing as minors ===
It is common for young asylum-seekers not to have any proof of age, either because it was lost or destroyed on their journey to the UK or because they never had any paperwork. Some may not know their own date of birth. In any given year a few hundred out of several thousand applicants have their age disputed by the authorities. Where a young asylum-seeker's age is disputed by authorities, they may undergo an age assessment to provide an informed estimate. In 2016 just 370 of 9,800 child applicants were found to be over 18. This represents about 60% of asylum seekers who had their age disputed.

== Asylum process ==
In order to be able to make an application for asylum, a separated child must first be able to reach the UK. This has become more difficult in the last decade, with immigration officers being placed at ports and Eurostar stations and airline liaison officers being placed at airports to check the travel documents of anyone wishing to travel to the UK. If a young person is not legally able to enter the UK under the immigration rules, they may be turned back before ever formally entering the UK. Assuming that they make it through the immigration controls, the next step is for a person to make a formal asylum application. This application can be made at the port of entry, at the Asylum Screening Unit in Croydon, or (only for children) at local immigration service enforcement offices.

When the application is completed, children will go through a Screening Interview, in which they are asked about personal details, reasons for coming to the UK, and their journey. As part of this process, the child receives immigration identification papers, including an Application Registration Card (ARC) confirming that the child has formally applied for asylum. Children over the age of 12 are given a date for a First Reporting Event with a case owner as well as a Statement of Evidence Form. This form provides details of the asylum case and must be filed within 20 working days by a legal representative.

Following the submission of the Statement of Evidence Form, children over twelve generally undergo an interview with an immigration official about their asylum application. This interview is supposed to establish whether the child qualifies either for refugee status under the Refugee Convention or for ill treatment under article 3 of the European Convention on Human Rights. However, the interview does not always receive the scrutiny that it should. The Immigration and Nationality Directorate has confirmed that children's asylum applications receive less consideration than those of adults because case-workers are influenced by the fact that even if a child's application is refused, that child will be granted a period of discretionary leave.

The asylum process on a larger scale is also subject to incorrect decisions that later have to be overturned. In 2011, the courts overturned 26% of initial Home Office decisions—a figure that rose to 50% for women.

Since then, legal reforms and increased scrutiny have improved decision-making processes, but challenges remain in timely processing and fair assessment of UASC cases.

=== Outcomes ===
There are four possible outcomes of the asylum claim: grant of asylum (refugee status); refusal of asylum but grant of humanitarian protection; refusal of asylum and humanitarian protection but grant of discretionary leave to remain; or refusal of asylum and any leave to remain. Only a small number of UASC receive refugee status: 'only 2% of unaccompanied or separated children were granted asylum when they applied in 2004 and only about 12% of unaccompanied or separated children succeeded when they appealed against an initial refusal to grant them refugee status.'

By far the most common outcome for separated children is a grant of discretionary leave to remain. Discretionary leave to remain is provided most frequently when there are inadequate return arrangements for these children in their country of origin. This leave to remain is usually granted for three years or until the young person reaches 17 ½, whichever is sooner. The child may appeal if he thinks he should have been granted refugee status or humanitarian protection, but only if he was initially granted more than twelve months' leave. Both grants of humanitarian protection and of discretionary leave are still rejection of asylum claims, so the young people granted either of these have the right to appeal this decision.

Current data indicates that the percentage of UASC granted refugee status has modestly increased due to changes in policy and improved legal support, with recent figures showing approximately 20-25% success on initial applications and higher rates on appeal.

== Education and social work ==
Before the age of eighteen, separated children are the responsibility of the local authority in which he or she is present. Upon the arrival of an unaccompanied child, the social services department of the local authority assesses the child's needs and provides assistance.

As with British children in care, though, care itself can take several different forms. If the unaccompanied asylum-seeking child is under 16 at the time of arrival, he or she is generally placed in foster care. Those who are 16 or 17 at the time of arrival—the majority of these children—may be placed in foster care, but generally are placed in semi-independent accommodation, i.e. in 'shared flats or supervised accommodation'. Most unaccompanied asylum-seeking children are supported under Section 20 of the Children Act 1989. Under Section 20, children's services must financially support young people until the age of 18 regardless of immigration status. The amount of financial support varies according to different local authorities' policies and placement. The "Hillingdon judgment" of 2003 (R (Behre) v London Borough of Hillingdon) established that after-care services must be provided until the young person reaches the age of 21, or beyond if they are in full-time education. In a subsequent legal challenge (R ex parte London Borough of Hillingdon v Secretary of State for Education and Skills), the local authority unsuccessfully challenged a decision of the Secretary of State to reduce the grant paid to the Council to support service provision.

Generally speaking, most local authorities have sent returns to the UK Border Agency (now superseded by UK Visas and Immigration) each month informing the agency how many days a separated child has received support.

A 2022 study highlights several key findings regarding the education of unaccompanied asylum-seeking children in the UK. Minors placed in foster care exhibited significantly higher educational attainment and GCSE scores compared to those in residential care or group homes, emphasizing the importance of supportive care environments. Enrollment in mainstream schools was linked to better academic outcomes, though challenges such as inconsistent teacher support, racial discrimination, and difficulties integrating with peers negatively impacted attendance and engagement. Older age at admission to care correlated with increased school absences, frequent school changes, and lower exam performance. Supportive teachers, particularly those using individualized ESOL (English for Speakers of Other Languages) strategies—such as small-group instruction, culturally responsive approaches, and collaboration with social workers—enhanced language acquisition and academic progress. However, systemic barriers, including dismissive attitudes toward prior education, lack of school integration efforts, and exposure to racist bullying, exacerbated vulnerabilities. Social workers and foster parents continue to highlight the critical need for advocacy and tailored support to address these challenges and sustain minors' educational trajectories.

== Pathways at eighteen ==
Pathway planning refers to the process of social workers planning out the different possibilities that an unaccompanied asylum-seeking child may be facing when leaving care and potentially facing a change in status. The pathway plan should detail how a young person's needs will be met, and carried out every six months. Pathway planning is a part of leaving care for all care leavers, not just UASC, but it is particularly necessary for separated children.

Many unaccompanied asylum-seeking children are facing a change in status as they approach 18, as most are initially given discretionary leave to remain until age 17 ½. This expiration of leave affects not only their benefits but also their ability to remain in the UK at all. To extend leave to remain, the young person has to apply for an extension of discretionary leave to remain prior to the expiration, but even applying on time does not guarantee outcomes. Pathway planning at eighteen, therefore, covers similar options to those that refugees face while undergoing the initial asylum process. If the young person received refugee status upon first application, then he/she will retain that status upon turning eighteen and pathway planning is much simpler.

If the unaccompanied asylum-seeking child initially was granted a period of discretionary leave, though, the process becomes more complicated. The young person may be granted an extension of discretionary leave to remain for another finite period, and thus has the ability to legally remain in the UK with full entitlements for another several years. Many young people, though, either have their applications rejected or do not put forth their applications to extend leave in advance of the deadline. These young people may return to their countries voluntarily or involuntarily. However, there is a large group of young people who remain in the country even after their request for extended leave is denied. This group is referred to as "end of line/appeal rights exhausted", and are people "who have been refused asylum or any form of temporary protection or their leave to remain has expired (and an application to extend it refused), and they have exhausted all appeals".

Although these people no longer have a legal right to remain in Britain, they have for one reason or another not been removed from the UK and instead remain. Non-removal can occur for any number of reasons, but most commonly it is because many countries have inadequate return procedures and it is complicated to ensure that people will be returned home safely. A common example of why people may remain in the UK is that the Home Office is frequently unable to obtain the travel documents that would allow a failed asylum-seeker to return to his country of origin.

== UN recommendations ==
The UN Committee on the Rights of the Child, which the UK works to abide by, states that "the appointment of a competent guardian as expeditiously as possible, serves a key procedural safeguard to ensure respect for the best interests of an unaccompanied or separated child." A guardianship programme has recently completed its second year of a pilot in Scotland. Though still small in scale, the programme has thus far been received fairly positively by the agencies that it interacts with. The Scottish Guardianship Service currently plans to continue offering guidance from guardians to former separated children over the age of eighteen.

In 2023, a UK-wide consultation was launched exploring the potential for a statutory guardianship scheme to improve protections for UASC, building on the Scottish model. Early reports from the consultation indicate broad support among stakeholders but highlight funding and resource challenges.

== Agencies ==
Although there are many agencies that work with unaccompanied asylum-seeking children, these are a few of the agencies that most frequently receive referrals.

=== Asylum Aid ===
Asylum Aid provides legal representation and other legal services to people in the UK seeking asylum. This includes both children arriving with their parents and children who arrive as unaccompanied minors.

=== Coram Children's Legal Centre ===
Coram Children's Legal Centre provides an advice helpline for all migrant, asylum-seeking, and refugee youth.

=== Children and Families Across Borders (CFAB) ===
CFAB works primarily to advise social workers on the options available for unaccompanied asylum-seeking children. CFAB also undertakes independent risk assessments in order to assess the risk factors for an UASC who may be considering return to his or her country of origin. The agency additionally works to locate the family members of UASC to try to facilitate reunions.

=== The Children's Society ===
The Children's Society has many programs that help refugee and asylum-seeking youth both in London, where many refugees are concentrated, and throughout the UK. Blackburn Young Refugees provides mental and emotional support services to young refugees and asylum seekers in Blackburn. New Londoners works in several capacities with unaccompanied asylum-seeking children. The program as a whole serves as an advocacy and support group for young asylum seekers, while its Supported Option Project provides advocacy and legal support specifically to UASC who have problems with their immigration status. New Londoners also operates a Destitution Project for young asylum seekers at risk of destitution or who are already destitute. The West Midlands Refugee Programme provides mentorship to unaccompanied asylum-seeking children in Birmingham and Coventry, as well as housing a destitution project.

=== Scottish Guardianship Service ===
As referenced above, the Scottish Guardianship Service has been piloting a system of guardianship in Scotland. The service is currently confined to Scotland, and is provided to every unaccompanied asylum-seeking child who is newly arrived to Scotland. The role of a guardian in the program is to serve as a link between the many services that UASC receive, to help the youth understand the roles of the services and the intricacies of the immigration system, and to advocate on behalf of the child.

=== Refugee Council ===
The Refugee Council's Children's Section part of the Asylum Support Partnership is a nationally operating service that works both directly with unaccompanied asylum-seeking children and with those providing support, serving about 3,000 UASC each year. Its Panel Advice Service helps these young people through the asylum seeking by providing direct advice, as well as working in conjunction with social workers who are assigned to work with the UASC. The Children's Section also organizes educational classes, including English classes, and social activities in its office in Croydon.

== Missing children ==
It was reported in 2023 that 200 unaccompanied asylum-seeking children had gone missing from hotels arranged for by the Home Office, with 66 missing from the Brighton and Hove local authority alone.

== See also ==
- Political asylum § United Kingdom
- Refugee
- Transnational child protection
- Unaccompanied Refugee Minors Program, a similar programme in the United States
