= Transnational child protection =

Protection of children from violence, exploitation, abuse and neglect

Transnational child protection refers to the protection of children from violence, exploitation, abuse and neglect in an international setting. When a non-national child comes into contact with public authorities and service providers, a series of checks, assessments and immediate measures sets in to identify the child and to assess her or his situation. Article 19 of the UN Convention on the Rights of the Child provides for the protection of children in and out of the home, including in their country of origin, residence or a third country. Article 2 of the Convention provides for the right to non-discrimination, meaning children have the right to protection regardless of the national origin or status of the child or his or her parents or legal guardians.

A child may become party to a transnational child protection case because of a need for protection, including: due to international adoption, being born to parents with different or multiple nationalities, being born in a different country than either parent's nationality, and migrating or being trafficked. Being an unaccompanied or separated minor comes with particular challenges.

== Case assessment ==
=== Best interests’ assessment and determination ===
Best interests, which derives from Article 3 of the UN Convention on the Rights of the Child, says that “in all actions concerning children, whether undertaken by public or private social welfare institutions, courts of law, administrative authorities or legislative bodies, the best interests of the child shall be a primary consideration”. Assessing the best interests of a child means to evaluate and balance “all the elements necessary to make a decision in a specific situation for a specific individual child or group of children”.

The right of the child to have her or his best interests taken as a primary consideration means that the child's interests have high priority and are not just one of several considerations. The assessment is specific to the child as an individual, making it important to establish a trust-based relationship with the child and to communicate effectively in a language that the girl or boy understands. The assessments should ideally involve a multi-disciplinary team of qualified professionals. Best interests’ assessments and determinations are two steps of a process that aims to identify the elements and facts relevant for a specific child.

In transnational cases, risk and resilience assessments are a central component of the best interests’ determination process because they consider the context of destination and origin and also how the risks and resiliency of the child will change on the basis of any decision taken, including with regard to continued migration, transfer to another state or repatriation.

A comprehensive best interests’ assessment and determination process considers the following in transnational cases:

- Establishing the child's identity and the identity of any accompanying persons and the quality of their relations
- Case assessment, including the following components:
  - Hearing the child
  - Assessment of the child's situation, background and needs
  - Social situation and family assessment
  - Gathering evidence including through forensic examinations and interviews with the child
  - Risk and security assessments
  - Mapping sources of support, skills, potentials and resources for empowerment
- Developing a life project
- Comprehensive child impact assessment of any potential decisions
- Identification of a durable solution
- Continued assessments during the implementation of the durable solution with due follow-up, review and monitoring, and adjustments to the durable solution arrangements, if and as required, according to the best interests of the child.

==== Assessments ====
Best interests’ assessments can be conducted informally and ad hoc or as formalised processes. Assessments look at everyday matters and decisions with more or less severe implications for the child. The best interests of a child may change significantly over time as children grow and their situations and capacities evolve, so their best interests’ may need to be reassessed periodically.

==== Determinations ====
Best interests’ determinations are formal processes conducted with the involvement of public authorities and professional decision makers. The objective of the best interests’ determination is to reach a decision based on national law that safeguards the rights of the child and promotes her or his well-being, safety and development. Decision-makers weigh and balance all the relevant factors of the case, giving due consideration to all the rights of the child and the obligations of public authorities and service providers towards the child. The objective of the best interests’ determination process is the identification of a durable solution. Best interests’ determinations are carried out when the issues at stake are expected to have significant implications on the child's present and future life.

=== Sources of information ===
Assessments leading to best interests’ determinations are based on diverse information sources which need to be verified and cross-checked in order to establish a reliable understanding of the child's situation and background.

- The central source of information is the child. It is fundamental that the story, the background, the views, needs and aspirations of the child are heard and taken into account.
- Professionals from different backgrounds should together take into account their perspectives, expert reports, and opinions, including with regard to the child's history and health, education, care, protection and developmental needs.
- When in migration or movement, information about the child's reasons for leaving and conditions and experiences during the journey should be collected and considered. National and local authorities in countries of origin and transit can be important sources of information. When contacting authorities in countries of transit and origin, professionals and officials in the country of destination consider best interests of the child and in respect of confidentiality rules, especially for children who are applying for asylum.
- Family tracing and assessment constitutes another important source of information. National central authorities, ministries, regional or local social services may provide relevant information and contacts established through international networks such as the International Committee of the Red Cross, the International Social Service or the International Organization for Migration. In some cases, local social services get directly in contact with their counterparts in the child's country of origin. The information gathering and sharing with these sources should respect national data protection laws and regulations and any matters of confidentiality related to the asylum procedure.
- Child-specific and gender-specific country of origin information needs to be developed and used and child-specific forms of persecution recognised. Country of origin information is available from national migration authorities and their networks, as well as the European Asylum Support Office, UNICEF and the United Nations High Commissioner for Refugees.
- Law enforcement agencies may be important sources of information in cases involving law enforcement investigations, in civil or criminal matters. Europol, Interpol and national police liaison officers based abroad, constitute important points of entry for law enforcement enquiries in international cases.
- Judges may seek regional and international networks of judges to gather information if a trial involves a transnational case that has been heard by a court of law in another country.

==== Data protection and confidentiality ====
Caseworkers and officers are bound by the rules of data protection and confidentiality and have to respect the child's right to privacy, a requirement which can conflict with the need to share information about children with other authorities or professionals within countries of destination and across borders. National and international laws of the country of destination apply to the processing and use of personal information.

In the case of asylum seekers, confidentiality rules are observed when information is sought from or transferred to countries of origin. The authorities that receive and assess an asylum application must not inform the authorities of the applicant's country of origin about the asylum claim and must not share any information about the applicant with the country of origin. Confidentiality rules apply also for the communication with countries of origin that are considered safe. When an asylum application has been rejected and all legal remedies are exhausted, the country of destination is authorised to share limited personal data with the authorities of the country of origin in order to facilitate return. This may be necessary when the person has no valid identity documents. The fact that the person has applied for asylum must however not be disclosed to the authorities in the country of origin.

=== Inter-agency and multi-disciplinary cooperation ===
Best interests’ assessments and determination processes use the knowledge and perspectives from different professional groups in order to achieve a holistic understanding of the child’s situation and background. With the child at the center, officials and professionals from different backgrounds assess, plan and manage each case. The process benefits from trusted partnerships of multi-stakeholder and inter-disciplinary cooperation within countries and across borders. Free exchange of information among professionals, volunteers and caregivers provides an understanding of the different laws and regulations concerning the child as well as the child’s situation, experiences, needs and aspirations. A common understanding of key concepts, terms and definitions, familiarity with the mandates of each partner, clear regulations of working routines, including clear regulation of data protection and confidentiality, and rules for the division of tasks and leadership, ideally in an institutionalised context, enables good communication among stakeholders. The benefits of inter-agency and multi-disciplinary cooperation include:

- a balanced and holistic approach to the assessment and determination of the child’s best interests;
- the views of the child inform the action of each professional or official while reducing the number of interviews or formal hearings with the child to a minimum;
- the work is conducted effectively and efficiently, especially when approaches are child-sensitive and child-centred, giving the child meaningful opportunities to be informed and heard, reducing risks of secondary victimisation during investigations and procedures, while also reducing the strain on individual professionals or agencies;
- decision making processes are safe and sound and lead to rights-based and sustainable outcomes.

=== Identification ===
Identification determines the child’s identity as part of a best interests’ assessment. Identification considers nationality, upbringing, ethnic, cultural and linguistic background of the child. Vulnerabilities and protection needs connected to the child's identity and background are identified.

In many cases, especially when children cannot present valid identity and travel documents, establishing the identity of a child is a process that requires communication and information exchange between countries of origin and arrival. It entails the identification of a child's name and age, national and ethnic origin, family relations as well as the circumstances of the child's mobility. The identification process might also require an assessment of the nature of the relations between a child and the person they are traveling with.

=== Age assessment ===
Age assessments are conducted when children arrive to a country without valid identity documents or the validity of their documents is questioned. It is not uncommon for children from less developed countries to not be registered at birth, making reliable information about their age and identity difficult for authorities in countries of destination to access.

Identity established in a country of transit may appear incorrect. This could be the case with erroneous statements or assessments of age made in a first point of arrival and challenged or contested by the child or the authorities later on. The child or the authorities might want to fix this.

==== Relevance ====
Establishing the age of the person is relevant for a range of matters:

- Age determines whether the person is a ‘child’ and therefore eligible to enjoy the rights afforded under the UN Convention on the Rights of the Child and national laws concerning children.
- Age can make a difference for the referral of the person to shelters and support services, not only for differentiating between accommodation for adults and children but also because younger children and adolescents may fall under the responsibility of different authorities.
- Age is a factor in the appointment of a guardian, the child's right to access work and legal employment, and establishing criminal responsibility.
- Age affects the child's right to be heard, including in legal and administrative proceedings, to act as party to proceedings, to appeal decisions independently and to have access to legal assistance and representation.
- Age matters when children have been granted a temporary protection status (‘leave to remain’) until they turn 18 years old.

From a human rights perspective, continuity of care and supporting the young person's development into adulthood may have priority than the age determination in some cases, including when the child is returned to a country of origin.

==== Methods ====
Common methods for assessing age include medical and physical examinations and social observations. A purely physical examination may be unreliable. X-rays of the person's wrist or other physical examinations are criticised for being invasive of the person's privacy and physical inviolability. They are also known to be inaccurate, arbitrary or imprecise and have a significant margin of error. Poor living conditions, nutrition and hygiene can lead to stunted growth and development of children coming from contexts characterised by poverty. Cultural matters, environmental and living conditions as well as the individual physical, psychological and cognitive development can have a strong impact on the way a young person is perceived. In some cultures, children under 18 are considered adults as soon as they perform an initiation rite, regardless of their biological age, and their behaviour may appear very mature.

International guidelines recommend that, in cases of doubt, the person shall be assumed to be under 18 years old, be referred to child protection services and shall have an appointed guardian. When an age assessment is necessary, the assessment shall be multi-disciplinary and take the child's origin and background into account while not compromising the physical integrity of the person and respect for her or his dignity. Multi-disciplinary means that one authority, ideally the social services, take the lead in the assessment and engage all other relevant agencies involved with the case in order to achieve a holistic approach while avoiding unnecessary repetition of interviews with the child or examinations by different agencies. Age assessment procedures shall involve a hearing of the person and be conducted in a child- and gender-sensitive way, with the informed consent of the person. The person should be assisted by a guardian or another competent support person, and be informed about the procedure and the implications of its outcomes. The person should have the possibility and access to support to appeal the results. The margin of error should be applied giving the benefit of the doubt in the individual's favour.

=== Assessing risk factors, resiliency and sources of support ===
Caseworkers and officers are better able to protect children when they have a good understanding of the risks the child faces. Risk assessments are conducted at different moments in the reception and care of a child and are part of social inquiries and best interests’ determinations. Assessed risks are factors in transnational child protection cases:

- in decisions about the child's referral, placement and arrangements for care and security;
- in the identification of a durable solution;
- in relation to criminal investigations and proceedings, when the child is known or presumed to be a victim of trafficking or other crime and when the child acts as witness;
- when the child has been involved in illegal or criminal activities and there are reasons to assume that the child has been exploited or abused in this context;
- when the child is transferred to another country under the Dublin III Council Regulation; and
- when the possibility and conditions for a child to return are being assessed.

Risk assessments analyse individual, family and structural or institutional factors that could cause or increase the risks of a child. These assessments are an opportunity to assess and understand the resiliency of the child and the family and to identify the support available from the family or community, from social support networks and service providers. Mapping sources of risk and resiliency for the child and the family is a precursor to preparing a safety and the identification and implementation of a durable solution. Risk assessments give very concrete hints about what kind of support is needed to build resiliency, to strengthen the protective resources and capacities of the child, the family and the social context.

A risk assessment takes into account:

- Age- and gender-specific risks,
- The child's awareness and understanding of risks,
- The knowledge about rights, entitlements and sources of support and the access and use of these,
- Previous experiences of violence, exploitation and abuse,
- Any emotional or behavioural problems, and
- The educational background of the child and caregivers.

A number of factors can affect the risk assessment:

- Family relations and the socio-economic situation of the family and their social inclusion or exclusion in the community, including access to and use of social support networks and family support services.
- Awareness within the family of childcare and protection, parenting skills and the prevalence of domestic or gender-based violence.
- The capacity of local service providers to support the child and the family effectively through services for protection, rehabilitation and the prevention of further harm.
- Socio-political dynamics, such gender-based and other discrimination, inequalities or exclusion of certain population groups or minorities.
- The level of tolerance of violence, including specifically violence against women and children.
- Risk assessments that are multi-disciplinary in nature, involving the child and the family, the authorities and key professions in the country of destination and origin give the most accurate picture.

== Protective measures ==
=== Guardians and representatives for non-national children ===
Unaccompanied or separated minors are appointed guardians who represent and promote the best interests of the child and support the child when in contact with the authorities and service providers. Caseworkers, officers and service providers involve the guardian in the care planning and decision making processes, in hearings concerning immigration matters and appeal, and all other matters relevant for the child's case. In order to enable the effective communication with the child, guardians may need access to quality interpretation. The guardian or representative does not usually give legal advice. Children who are involved in administrative or judicial proceedings, including asylum proceedings, are provided a lawyer and legal assistance separately. When a child is moved from one accommodation to a different shelter, reception centre or foster family, continuity of guardianship ensures stability for the child. When a child is returned to a country of origin or nationality, caseworkers and officers ensure continuity of guardianship to enable the cooperation between guardians in countries of destination and return and the hand-over of guardianship responsibilities across borders.

==== Family tracing and re-establishing family links ====
Family tracing is the first step towards re-establishing the contact between an unaccompanied child and her or his family of origin. It is necessary to assess the child's family situation.

Family tracing can be initiated upon the request of the child or on the initiative of the authorities. Informed consent of the child and the child's views about family tracing should be heard prior to initiating the process. If the child is against family tracing, the dialogue with the child should be sought to understand the child's position. Family tracing shall only be conducted when it is considered to be in the best interests of the child. This means that tracing and restoring the family ties is expected not to cause the child or the family any harm or other adverse effects.

Family tracing can take place in the child's country of origin or another country to where the family has migrated, within the European Union or in third countries, according to the family situation and their history of migration or displacement. Caseworkers and officers can request the assistance of international organisations for family tracing, for instance the national branch of the International Social Service or the Red Cross.

When unaccompanied children from third countries seek asylum in a Member State of the European Union, the EU Reception Conditions Directive says family tracing shall start as soon as possible after an application for international protection is made whilst protecting the best interests’ of the child. In cases where there may be a threat to the life or integrity of the child or her or his close relatives, family tracing must be undertaken on a confidential basis, in order to avoid jeopardising the safety of the child or the family members. This applies when the child's asylum application is being processed or in a third country.

For children who migrate within the EU and who have lost contact with their families, the authorities in the country of destination might initiate a family tracing before returning the child to her or his country of origin as part of a best interests’ determination. These assessments are usually done in cooperation with the authorities in the country where the family lives. The authorities in the country of destination can however also decide to return the child to the country of origin without conducting family tracing when the country is considered safe. This is a common practice within the European Union as all Member States are considered safe and national child protection authorities are considered competent and qualified to trace a family, to assess the best interests of the child with regard to family reunification and to provide quality alternative care if necessary. An individual assessment for each child is required in order to ensure that return without prior family tracing is in the best interests of the child and to exclude any risks to the child in the country of origin.

For child victims of trafficking who have been officially recognised as such in a country of destination, family tracing is conducted in order to explore the possibility of returning the child to the family of origin, and to assess any possible risks as well as sources of protection in the family environment.

==== Maintaining family relations and contact ====
Children who are unaccompanied or separated from their family have a right to remain in contact and to maintain family relations, wherever this is not contrary to the best interests of the child.

When legal regulations on family contact for unaccompanied children are not in place, the support of care staff, guardians and other relevant professionals is essential to ensure that unaccompanied children maintain relations and contact with their home countries, communities and families, wherever this is in their best interests and in accordance with confidentiality standards during the asylum procedure.

== Durable solutions ==
A durable solution is identified on the basis of a best interests’ determination and it is therefore different for each individual unaccompanied or separated child, including refugees and asylum seekers, and children who are victims of trafficking. Its longer-term objectives ensure the child's safety, well-being and development. It leads to family reunification or alternative care arrangements according to the best interests of the child.

The identification and implementation of a durable solution involves different agencies and the child's guardian. The child is at the centre of the process and her or his views have to be heard and taken into due consideration.

When the best interests’ determination process concludes that a child has no grounds for international protection and that transfer to a third country is not an option, the possibility of returning the child to the country of origin will be assessed. In these situations, a comprehensive assessment looks for updated information on the following matters:

- The safety and security situation in the place of return;
- The conditions awaiting the child upon return, including socio-economic conditions;
- The availability and appropriateness of care arrangements for the child according to her or his individual needs;
- The continuity in a child's upbringing, care arrangements and development;
- The views of the child and the caretaker(s) regarding return;
- The child's level of integration in the country of destination;
- The duration of absence from the country of origin and the quality of the child's relations and contact with the home country;
- The child's right to preserve her or his identity, including nationality, name and family relations;
- The child's ethnic, religious, cultural and linguistic background.

When these assessments conclude that return is indeed in the best interests of the child, return will be ordered and the preparations for return will set in. In any other case, where there are doubts that return corresponds to the best interests of the child or where the assessments do not lead to satisfactory outcomes, the option of return must be reconsidered.

=== For unaccompanied children ===
A durable solution for an unaccompanied or separated child is understood as “a sustainable solution that ensures that the unaccompanied or separated child is able to develop into adulthood, in an environment which will meet his or her needs and fulfil his or her rights as defined by the UN Convention on the Rights of the Child and will not put the child at risk of persecution or serious harm. Because the durable solution will have fundamental long-term consequences for the unaccompanied or separated child, it will be subject to a best interests’ determination. A durable solution also ultimately allows the child to acquire, or to re-acquire, the full protection of a state.”

The term durable solution comprises three options:

- The return and reintegration in the country of origin;
- The granting of international protection or other legal residence status allowing children to integrate in the country of destination; or
- Resettlement to a third country.

== Life projects ==
In 2007, the Committee of Ministers of the Council of Europe adopted a recommendation on ‘life projects’ for unaccompanied children. The recommendation aims to promote the identification of “... lasting solutions for and with unaccompanied migrant minors that will help them to build life projects guaranteeing them a better future”.

A ‘life project’ is an individual care planning and case management tool. It helps unaccompanied children and the competent state authorities to collaborate in a transparent and respectful way. The objective is to jointly confront the challenges that result from the child's migration and to plan and implement a sustainable solution for the child.

Life project planning starts as early as possible and proceeds in parallel to the best interests’ determination process. Life project planning supports the identification and implementation of a durable solution, without interfering with the decision about where the durable solution is implemented. Life projects do not anticipate any decision about the child's stay in the destination country, return or resettlement. The responsibility for developing life projects rests primarily with the authorities of the destination country, while the implementation might involve the countries of origin or other states. Life projects help children and young people transition into adulthood and an independent life. Strengthening the transnational cooperation between the relevant authorities is a key aspect for the development and implementation of life projects.

== Missing children ==
In countries of destination, many children leave care arrangements without informing the authorities of their whereabouts. When children go missing, they risk being exposed to harmful and destitute living conditions, exploitation and abuse.

Some children who ‘go missing’ move on to other countries. Children may refuse to lodge an asylum application. Some children do not wait for the decision on their application before leaving reception centres and others leave when their applications have been rejected. Some might continue their journeys in order to reach their final destinations, to join family members or other contacts abroad. Others might be trafficked and follow the routes determined by their traffickers or exploiters. Effective national responses and transnational cooperation are important to locate these children and to ensure their safety.

Care staff, guardians and service providers prevent children from going missing by establishing a trust-based relationship and communication with the child and supporting children in integrating socially into the community of destination. This includes demonstrating that the child's views, needs and aspirations are being heard and taken into account in a meaningful way at all stages of their reception, referral and care and in the best interests’ determination. Social contacts and support networks may help to prevent a child from going missing. When children have mobile phones and e-mail accounts and share their contact details with care staff or trusted persons, remaining in contact can be a way for reconnecting children to services once they have left. Previous identification and registration, including of photographs, is critical to look for children once they have left. National protocols for missing persons can guide the cooperation of different authorities in preventing and tracing missing children and should ideally be extended across borders.

When an unaccompanied child goes missing, police investigate the case in the same way as cases of national children missing. This is required under the obligations of the state to ensure the safety and well-being of any child within its jurisdiction, as afforded under the UN Convention on the Rights of the Child, in particular the principle of non-discrimination under Article 2. The child's guardian, social services and care staff and the child's lawyer, where applicable, should be informed about the progress of the investigations. Guardianship arrangements do not cease when a child is missing.

== Further information and technical assistance ==
Many transnational child protection cases are complex and difficult to assess, especially when criminal acts are involved, such as exploitation and trafficking, and when the child's identity, relations and aspirations are not entirely clear. Specialised expertise is key, including expertise in child protection, social affairs, family mediation, criminal law and security matters, migration issues, interpretation and cultural mediation.

Specialised knowledge and experience with unusual and complex cases may however not be available in each municipality, especially in small towns and in rural areas. For officials and professionals working with and for children should know whom to contact in order to seek information, technical assistance and specialised expertise.

The following are some key contact points to approach:

- National institutes, commissions or Ombuds Offices for human rights or specifically for children's rights
- Central authorities for child protection, which are in place for different themes and are usually connected to the Hague Conventions on child protection and international family law and to the Brussels II bis Regulation
- The national migration authorities
- National Rapporteurs or observatories on human trafficking
- The national branches of the International Social Service in the countries involved in the case
- NGOs and child rights advocates focusing on matters concerning children on the move and/or child victims of crime
- National institutions supporting victims of crime
- National or regional offices of UNICEF, the United Nations High Commissioner for Refugees (UNHCR) or the International Organization for Migration (IOM).

== See also ==
- Children's rights
- Convention on the Rights of the Child
- Child labour
- Child migration
- Child trafficking
- Commercial sexual exploitation of children
- Convention on the Rights of the Child
- International child abduction
- Palermo protocols
- Right to be heard
- Trafficking of children
- United Nations Global Initiative to Fight Human Trafficking
- Unaccompanied minor
