= Child migration =

Movement of children to another area without a guardian

Child migration or "children in migration or mobility" (sometimes more generally "children on the move") is the movement of people ages 3–18 within or across political borders, with or without their parents or a legal guardian, to another country or region. They may travel with or without legal travel documents. They may arrive to the destination country as refugees, asylum seekers, or economic migrants.

== Reasons for migration ==
The motivations for children to migrate are as diverse as the individuals who migrate. They include economic reasons, educational aspirations, reasons related to gender or culture, personal motivations as well as emergencies, natural disasters, persecution and humanitarian crises. Some children leave in search of better opportunities while others escape violence, exploitation, abuse or conflict. Multiple reasons often coincide. When parents migrate or separate, children may move to another place or country with one or both parents, or they might be left behind by their parents and are then indirectly affected by migration.

== Rights of children in migration and mobility ==
=== The right to be heard ===
The right to be heard is a child rights principle as defined by the UN Convention on the Rights of the Child. According to Article 12 of the convention, children have the right to express their views in all matters affecting them, and their views have to be given due weight in accordance with the age and maturity of the child. This right applies equally to children's participation in social and political matters as well as in judicial and administrative proceedings. As a general principle, the child's right to be heard reflects the concept of children's ‘agency’, viewing children not only as vulnerable persons in need of special protection, but also as informed decision makers, rights holders and active members of society.

Many children are reluctant to share information with the authorities in the country of destination due to fears that disclosing information might not be in their interest and that telling their story might lead to being returned to their country of origin. Children might have been instructed by third persons to reveal only certain parts of their story, there might be threats and fears of reprisals involved, and the child might not trust the police and local authorities will be able to protect them. A reception system that demonstrates respect and upholds the dignity of the child can achieve to foster a sense of trust in the child towards the officials and professionals whom she or he meets with. Interpreters might influence the information gathering process in asylum procedures and criminal investigations as they affect how the child's story is being understood and perceived. Inaccurate translation might compromise the child's statement, leading to decisions on the basis of incorrect information. This relates not only to the content translated but also to the style and semantic choices made by the child and how the interpreters convey the message.

=== Best interests’ assessment and determination ===
Best interests is defined in Article 3 of the UN Convention on the Rights of the Child, which says that “in all actions concerning children, whether undertaken by public or private social welfare institutions, courts of law, administrative authorities or legislative bodies, the best interests of the child shall be a primary consideration”. Assessing the best interests of a child means to evaluate and balance “all the elements necessary to make a decision in a specific situation for a specific individual child or group of children”. The right of the child to have her or his best interests taken as a primary consideration means that the child's interests have high priority and are not just one of several considerations. The assessment is specific to the child as an individual, making it important to establish a trust-based relationship with the child and to communicate effectively in a language that the girl or boy understands. The assessments ideally involves a multi-disciplinary team of qualified professionals.

Risk and resilience assessments are a central component of the best interests’ determination process because they consider the context of the countries of destination and origin and also how the risks and resiliency of the child will change on the basis of any decision taken.

In transnational cases, a comprehensive best interests’ assessment and determination process considers the following:

- Establishing the child's identity and the identity of any accompanying persons and the quality of their relations
- Case assessment, including the following components:
  - Hearing the child
  - Assessment of the child's situation, background and needs
  - Social situation and family assessment
  - Gathering evidence including through forensic examinations and interviews with the child
  - Risk and security assessments
  - Mapping sources of support, skills, potentials and resources for empowerment
- Developing a life project
- Comprehensive child impact assessment of any potential decisions
- Identification of a durable solution
- Continued assessments during the implementation of the durable solution with due follow-up, review and monitoring, and adjustments to the durable solution arrangements, if and as required, according to the best interests of the child

In the country of Ghana, there is a topic focused on the education comparison between migrant and non-migrant students. It is shown that the non-migrant students received more attention, and therefore, scored higher than the migrant students. More attention needs to be shown to the migrants just as much as its shown to all the other students.

=== Right to non-discrimination: Status, access and jurisdiction ===
The Convention on the Rights of the Child affords a broad protection from discrimination and the essential and equal inalienable rights afforded to all human beings. It stipulates that States Parties shall respect and ensure the rights set forth in the convention to each child within their jurisdiction without discrimination of any kind, irrespective of the child's or his or her parents' or legal guardian's race, color, sex, language, religion, political or other opinion, national, ethnic or social origin, property, disability, birth or other status.

The rights afforded under the Convention apply to non-national children, regardless of their immigration status or the migration status of their parents. This includes children who are visiting, refugees, children of migrant workers and undocumented children. The right to non-discrimination entitles each child to immediate assistance and support while the situation of the child and her or his best interests are being assessed. Non-discrimination does not imply that a child is granted an automatic permit of stay, but that a decision is taken on the basis of the best interests’ determination, whether a child shall be returned or whether the country of destination assumes jurisdiction over the child.

While assessing the child’s case and situation, state authorities have a responsibility to clarify which state has the jurisdiction over a child and, if required and appropriate, transfer or establish jurisdiction in the country of destination. When jurisdiction over a non-national child remains unclear, the child risks staying in a state of uncertainty and might benefit only from temporary services and protection measures, until the child’s status is fully regularised or the child returns to the country holding jurisdiction. Common factors that affect jurisdiction include:

- There could be a case pending at court in which the child is involved,
- Social services in another country may have been monitoring the child and her or his family;
- The child’s situation may have been under law enforcement investigations in another country, including where child trafficking is suspected;
- The child may have handed in an asylum application in another country;
- The child may be registered as a ‘missing child’ abroad.

=== Development ===
The rights of the child to life, survival and development is afforded under Article 6 of the Convention on the Rights of the Child. These rights are recognized by

States and are related to survival, security and health as a precondition for physical development as well as the mental, spiritual, moral, intellectual, cognitive, emotional and sociology-cultural development of the child. This is in effort to ensure the maximum survival, growth and potential of the child.

The quality of care has a direct effect on a child's development. Promoting the child's developmental rights and needs means enabling her to grow up in her family of origin or in a family-based or family-like alternative care placement, wherever this is in the best interests of the child. The care arrangements and access to quality services for health and education are important when assessing the child's developmental needs.

The following factors are relevant when assessing the development needs of a child (with reference to the relevant articles under the UN Convention on the Rights of the Child):

- The right to preserve her or his identity, including nationality, name and family relations (Article 8);
- The continuity in the child's care and upbringing, with due regard to the child's ethnic, religious, cultural and linguistic background (Article 20);
- The right of the child to enjoy the highest attainable standard of health (Article 24);
- The right of every child to a standard of living adequate to the child's physical, mental, spiritual, moral and social development (Article 27);
- Access to education (Articles 28 and 29);
- The right of the child to rest and leisure, to engage in play and recreational activities appropriate to her or his age (Article 31).

=== Access to justice ===
==== Children and justice in transnational cases ====
Children on the move sometimes are affected by or are in conflict with the law, including with cross-border family disputes and matters of parental responsibility and contact, as asylum seekers or victims of crime and, in some cases, as children who are in conflict with the law for immigration matters or for illegal and criminal matters. Some children in conflict with the law are actually victims of crime. International and European law provide for clear standards regulating the treatment, rights and entitlement of children in contact with the judiciary, as victims, defendants or perpetrators of crime.

==== Child victims of crime ====
The UN Convention on the Rights of the Child prohibits the exploitation of children in any form and in any context (Articles 19, 32-36). Any child who is exposed to violence, exploitation or abuse can be considered a victim of crime and enjoys the correlated rights and entitlements, including access to assistance, protection and support, services for recovery and rehabilitation, access to justice, with due procedural safeguards in any related legal or administrative proceedings. Children at risk of exploitation should be identified as being at risk and referred to assistance and support in order to prevent their exploitation or any other harm.

==== Children exploited in illegal and criminal activities ====
An important safeguard for child victims of crime is the ‘non-punishment clause’. It means that child victims of criminal offences, including human trafficking, are to be protected from sanctions or prosecution for acts that they committed in relation to their situation as victims. The non-punishment clause protects children who are exploited in illegal or criminal activities and child victims of exploitation and/or trafficking who were forced to enter a country without valid travel documents.

The UN Guidelines on Justice in Matters involving Child Victims and Witnesses of Crime emphasis that “children who are victims and witnesses may suffer additional hardship if mistakenly viewed as offenders when they are in fact victims and witnesses.” The Guidelines say child victims should be protected from prosecution irrespective of any form of ‘consent’ or their active involvement in an offence and irrespective of the child's age in relation to national laws defining the age of criminal liability. A child victim should be considered and treated as such “... regardless of their role in the offence or in the prosecution of the alleged offender or groups of offenders”.

The Office of the High Commissioner for Human Rights (OHCHR) Recommended Principles and Guidelines on Human Rights and Human Trafficking and the UNICEF Guidelines on the Protection of Child Victims of Trafficking reiterate the right to non-criminalisation specifically in relation to the situation of victims of trafficking who are to be protected from criminal liability for “any criminal offence that was a direct result from being trafficked”. This provision is further strengthened by the non-punishment clause of the 2011 EU Anti-trafficking Directive and the Council of Europe Convention on Action against Trafficking in Human Beings, and is therefore made binding upon States Parties: “Each Party shall, in accordance with the basic principles of its legal system, provide for the possibility of not imposing penalties on victims for their involvement in unlawful activities, to the extent that they have been compelled to do so.” (Article 26).

When a non-national child is in conflict with the law and there are no indications that the child has been exploited in illegal activities or has otherwise been victimized, the same standards of juvenile justice applies to national children.

=== Right to consular assistance ===
Children who are outside of their country of residence have a right to assistance by embassies and consular offices representing their country. Consular staff can play an important role in supporting and assisting children abroad, establishing supportive contacts and referral, and mobilizing help. Consular staff may contact central authorities or national contact points for technical advice in cases involving children. Under the 1963 Vienna Convention on Consular Relations of the United Nations, consular functions include helping and assisting nationals of the sending state. This could involve measures to safeguard the interests of children who are nationals of the sending State within the limits imposed by the laws and regulations of the receiving State, particularly when a guardian needs to be appointed. The authorities of the country of destination must inform the competent consular office without delay when the appointment of a guardian for a child is considered. The laws and regulations of the receiving State concerning the appointment of a guardian apply and are not affected by the information sharing with the relevant consular offices.

=== Migration and mobility within the European Union ===
All individuals, including parents, families with children and unaccompanied children, enjoy freedom of movement within the European area. In the European area of freedom of movement, citizens of EU Member States and the EFTA States Iceland, Liechtenstein, Norway and Switzerland are entitled to enter and reside in other EU Member States for a period of up to three months without registration and are granted a permit to stay when they can demonstrate an income. The rights of children as unaccompanied migrants in the European area of freedom of movement are not explicitly defined and the related institutional responsibilities remain unclear. The way that national governments interpret and regulate the rules of freedom of movement for unaccompanied children under 18 years of age differs among the countries.

=== Asylum ===
The UN UN Refugee Convention and its Protocol regulate the right of persons to seek international protection. Children enjoy special safeguards and have a right to have their asylum application examined individually. Child-specific grounds of persecution need to be considered irrespective of whether the child applies alone or together with a parent or caregiver. The European Union Member States have re-elaborated these standards for the EU context and have adopted a series of Directives regulating the qualification and reception conditions of asylum seekers in the EU as well as asylum procedures and matters of return.

== Vulnerability ==
Children on the move are routinely referred to as ‘vulnerable’ although the meaning of the term has not been defined or clarified for the child protection context. Vulnerability is often understood as a deficit and equated with weakness and a need of protection. From a child rights-based approach, vulnerability refers to the limited chances of a child to fully exercise her or his rights as afforded under the UN Convention on the Rights of the Child. Existing definitions of vulnerability that are in use in the context of poverty reduction, health and nutrition can be useful in the child protection context.This vulnerability is worsened by weak legal protection. Youth on the move are even more vulnerable than adult migrants and face uprooting, demotion, lack of economic and material resources, lack of access to basic services, and an increased risk of abuse, violence and exploitation.

== Safe migration ==
Some children migrate well-protected and cared for and some succeed to achieve the goals that motivated their journeys. When migration is safe and successful, children have opportunities to increase their well-being, to access higher-quality services and to benefit from better education. Safe migration opportunities can support children significantly in their transition into adulthood and an independent life. They will have improved life chances, including in their transition into adulthood and the labor market, with better working conditions, higher salaries and an increased potential to contribute proactively to their communities and societies, in countries of origin and destination. Children and young adults might support their families through remittances and support the development of their communities of origin.

== Risks for children in migration ==
For children who migrate to escape difficult living situations, violence or conflict, migration can constitute an opportunity to reduce risks. Others encounter more severe risks during migration or at the place of destination. Some groups of children are vulnerable to exploitation and abuse, including trafficking, because of weak social safety nets. The risks a child is exposed to are often closely intertwined and are considered cumulative. A child who is already living in a vulnerable situation, such as poverty, abuse or school-drop out, is considered even more vulnerable when additional risks come in, such as exploitative relationships or risky migration.

Many child migrants are exposed to harm during the journey and at destination. Children face violence, exploitation and abuse at the hands of people they encounter in transit and at destination, including employers, transporters, smugglers and traffickers. They might experience significant levels of indifference or abuse by state officials, including police, border guards, immigration officials and staff in reception or detention facilities. Some migrants die on the journey from dehydration, malnourishment, suffocation or transportation accidents or drown at sea.

Unsafe migration conditions, by their nature, create risks for children. In addition to experiencing acts of violence, children risk to come into conflict with the law if they travel without the required documents, if they engage in illegal or criminal activities to make a living, or if they are persuaded or forced by others to do so. In situations of habitual mobility or circular migration, such conditions can influence the well-being, safety and development significantly of the child.

=== Exploitation ===
Children on the move are at risk of different forms of exploitation. They include sexual exploitation in prostitution and pornography, traveling sex offenders through web-cams, child abuse images and illegal content on the internet. Exploitation takes place in child labour and domestic work, as au-pairs, in factories, construction, asphalt laying, restaurants and cleaning industries, agriculture and berry picking and in begging. There are also transnational cases of early and forced marriage of children. The exploitation of children could be organised by families, small groups or large-scale criminal networks. Children are exploited also in illegal and criminal activities, including in drug production and drug trafficking, pick-pocketing or burglary. Child victims of trafficking are also increasingly used by traffickers for purposes such as begging, benefit fraud, identity fraud, credit fraud and insurance fraud.

=== Trafficking ===
Child trafficking is defined in the UN Trafficking Protocol of 2000 as the recruitment, transportation, transfer, harbouring or receipt of a child for the purpose of exploitation. While this definition applies only to transnational cases and/or cases involving organized criminal groups, child trafficking is now typically recognized well outside these parameters. The International Labour Organization expands definition to include movement and exploitation as key aspects of child trafficking.

Victims of transnational trafficking might cross borders with or without legal travel documents and with or without the assistance of smugglers. Persons are often recruited into trafficking only after they have crossed an international border. In many cases, trafficking takes place within countries and there are no border crossings involved. The UN Trafficking Protocol of 2000 considers the means of trafficking and the consent of the child to any of the trafficking acts as irrelevant in the identification of a trafficking victim. Forms of exploitation that could constitute trafficking include, “at a minimum, the exploitation of the prostitution of others or other forms of sexual exploitation, forced labour or services, slavery or practices similar to slavery, servitude or the removal of organs”.

Child trafficking can be prosecuted when it is possible to prove the intent to exploit the child, even when exploitation has not yet taken place. Varying interpretations sometimes make it difficult to distinguish child trafficking from other types of exploitation.

==== Definitions of child trafficking in Europe ====
The Council of Europe Convention on Action Against Trafficking in Human Beings (2005) adopted the international definition, identical in wording, underlining however that victims shall be protected also in cases where trafficking takes place within countries and without the involvement of large-scale organised crime groups.

The EU Anti-Trafficking Directive (2011) broadened the notion of exploitation in the trafficking concept. It explicitly includes the purpose of exploitation in criminal activities as part of the definition of human trafficking. Article 2.3 clarifies that the “‘exploitation of criminal activities’ should be understood as the exploitation of a person to commit, inter alia, pick-pocketing, shop-lifting, drug trafficking and other similar activities which are subject to penalties and imply financial gain”. The Directive states that “the exploitation of begging, including the use of a trafficked dependent person for begging, falls within the scope of the definition of trafficking in human beings only when all the elements of forced labour or services occur”.

=== Smuggling ===
The United Nations Protocol Against the Smuggling of Migrants by Land, Sea and Air defines human smuggling as the “procurement, in order to obtain, directly or indirectly, a financial or other material benefit of the illegal entry of a person into a State Party of which the person is not a national or a permanent resident”. A smuggler facilitates the border crossing of others without the required travel documents and for financial or other gain. Once a smuggler has facilitated the border crossing or ensured the migrant's arrival at the agreed destination, the contact between the smuggler and the smuggled migrants usually ceases. The smuggling of persons across international borders can be part of the act of trafficking when it is done for the purpose of exploiting the persons in the country of destination. Although smuggling is considered a crime against the state, persons who are using the services of smugglers might be victimized by acts of violence while being smuggled or they might die due to unsafe transportation conditions.

=== Sale of children ===
The sale of children means any act or transaction whereby a child is transferred by any person or group of persons to another for remuneration or any other consideration. While trafficking could involve the purchase and sale of persons, the sale of children may lead to exploitation but does not necessarily have to. Children are sometimes sold in illegal adoptions, for instance. Children are also sold for sexual exploitation or labour. In these cases, there may be an overlap between trafficking and sale as two criminal acts within a single case.

== Migration and sustainable development ==
The link between migration and development have been widely recognized. Migration is directly relevant to the 2030 Agenda for Sustainable Development. According to current demographic trends, the populations in richer countries will continue to age disproportionately while the younger generations are overrepresented in lower income countries, causing strain on the labour market, social security, education and nutrition.

Migration can mitigate these population imbalances on both ends. It has a potential to increase the work force and strengthen the younger generations in numbers where needed. This would mean increased contributions to the social welfare systems in higher income countries of destination and a reduced strain on the social welfare systems in countries of origin with high poverty and unemployment rates. Migration and mobility policies should ideally facilitate a mutual exchange of knowledge, capacity and human resources while preventing one directional movements and brain drain. Seen from this point of view, migration holds potential benefits for poverty reduction and for fostering more equitable and sustainable global development. The linkages between migration and development have implications for policy and practice in these areas and relevant measures need to be coordinated in countries of destination and origin.

From a human rights-based and development oriented perspective, countries of origin and destination share the responsibility for managing migration. Maximizing the good developments and minimizing the risks from migration could include developing the human capital of migrants and investing in migration management cooperation between countries of origin and destination in social, economic and political terms.

== History of child migration by country ==
=== Australia ===
During the late 19th and early 20th centuries, many Aboriginal Australian children were removed from their families and placed in institutions and foster homes, in what became known as the Stolen Generations.

130,000 children were migrated to Australia under assisted child migration schemes from Great Britain alone, with a small number from Malta. Child migrants were adopted or brought up in children's homes, institutions, orphanages or foster care. A large portion of these children were used in slave labour by the churches in Australia. Many of these children experienced neglect and abuse while in institutional care.

In November 2009 Australian Prime Minister, Kevin Rudd formally apologized to "Forgotten Australians" and child migrants on behalf of the nation. "Forgotten Australians" is a term the Australian Senate has used to describe children who were brought up in orphanages, children's homes, institutions or foster care in Australia. Child migrants are a specific group of "Forgotten Australians".

=== Bulgaria ===
Child migration was a phenomenon associated with the migration of Bulgarian market-gardeners to Austria-Hungary in the second half of 19th and early 20th Century, due to the use of child labor (mostly boys) in market-gardening. Child labor brought master gardeners the biggest profit since children did not get paid but worked as apprentices for their keep only. Younger children helped in the gardens and learned gardening skills, while those who were already physically strong performed specialized gardening activities. Different patterns of child migration can be distinguished based on the autobiographies and personal life stories of market-gardeners: children who migrated with their market-gardening parents as a family or those of market-gardeners who were born abroad; children who migrated with one of the parents (usually the market-gardening father) or with relatives of the market-gardening father so as to “learn the craft”; children who migrated with their market-gardening parents as a family, then the parents returned to their homeland with the younger children, while the older child was left abroad to work “on a garden” and make his own living, thus supporting his family financially.

=== Canada ===
The Canadian Indian residential school system, founded in the 19th century, was intended to force the assimilation of the Aboriginal peoples in Canada into European-Canadian society. The last residential school was closed in 1996. On June 11, 2008, Prime Minister Stephen Harper apologized, on behalf of the sitting Cabinet, in front of an audience of Aboriginal delegates, and in an address that was broadcast nationally on the CBC, for the past governments' policies of assimilation. In 2009, Pope Benedict XVI expressed his sorrow at "the anguish caused by the deplorable conduct of some members of the Church" and offered his "sympathy and prayerful solidarity".

=== Malta ===
310 children were emigrated from Malta to Australia between 1950 and 1965 under the ‘Child Migration to Australia Scheme’ following an agreement between the Australian Catholic Immigration committee and the Emigration and Labour Minister on 9 December 1949. Most of the Maltese children sent to Australia under this scheme came either from government orphanages or Church children's homes and all were said to have left with their parents’ consent. The Australian government had offered to welcome Maltese boys, aged between eight and 11, and girls aged between five and 10 years into Catholic institutions and promised to offer them employment supervised by the responsible Catholic authorities. One of these children became a priest and many others embarked on a career though many grew up hurt knowing that their parents had consented to their departure from home. The Maltese emigrants were included in the Australian Prime Minister's 2009 public apology to those who suffered abuse at the hands of their carers in institutions, orphanages and foster care.

=== Mandatory Palestine ===
During World War II, thousands of unaccompanied minors from Jewish families in Nazi-occupied Europe were transported to relative safety in Mandatory Palestine (now Israel).

=== United Kingdom ===
The practice of sending poor or orphaned children to the English settler colonies, to help alleviate the shortage of labour, began in England in 1618, with the rounding-up and transportation of 100 vagrant children to the Virginia Colony. Prior to the second half of the twentieth century, the Home Children programme was seen as a way to move impoverished children to a "better life" in Australia, Canada and elsewhere, also providing good "white stock" to former colonies. The children and parents were not consulted, and often siblings were separated. In total 130,000 children were sent from the United Kingdom to Canada, New Zealand, South Africa, Rhodesia (now Zimbabwe), and Australia. Often children were lied to about their parents being dead and many faced abuse in their new homes. In February 2010 British Prime Minister, Gordon Brown issued an official apology for the 'shameful' child resettlement programme and announced a £6 million fund designed to compensate the families affected by the "misguided" programme. The Child Migrants Trust has since set up the Family Restoration Fund in order to use this money to help reunite former child migrants with their families as part of the British government's package of support to former child migrants and their families.

During the Second World War, some 3.5 million children were evacuated from areas at risk of aerial bombing to rural locations. (see Evacuations of civilians in Britain during World War II.)

Also during World War II, nearly 10,000 unaccompanied minors from Jewish families in Nazi-occupied Europe were transported to safety in the UK.

A study completed in 2012 by the University of Oxford's Centre on Migration, Policy and Society (COMPAS) led by Dr Nando Sigona has shed light on the situation of children with no right to live in the United Kingdom. The study, 'No way out, no way in: Irregular migrant children and families in the UK', estimates a population of 120,000 children without status, of whom 65,000 were born in the UK to parents with no right to live in the country.

=== United States ===
During the 19th century there were a number of attempts to move children from crowded east coast cities to midwestern and western rural families & orphanages. Most famous was the orphan train movement. Additionally Native American children were separated from their families & sent to boarding schools to force them into assimilating western culture.

=== Finland ===
During the Second World War, when Finland was at war with Russia, about 70 000 Finnish children were transported by train and boat mainly to Sweden, but also to Norway and Denmark. These children are commonly referred to as war children. By the end of the war, thousands of children were adopted by their "new" parents.

== See also ==
- Unaccompanied minor
- Transnational child protection
- List of international and European law on child protection and migration
- Right to be heard
- Best interests
- Child trafficking
- Anchor child
- Kindertransport
