= List of international and European laws on child protection and migration =

The following is a list of international standards that are relevant to the protection of children in migration and mobility. These standards are legally binding conventions, treaties and directives. The international legal framework concerning children in migration and mobility provides safeguards in relation to asylum and international protection, labour regulations, the prevention of sexual exploitation and trafficking in human beings, international standards for migrant workers, child victims of crime and the judiciary, as well as international private law for child protection and family matters.

== International ==
International standards of the United Nations, once adopted by the General Assembly of the United Nations, are open to signature and ratification by UN Member States worldwide. When a national government ratifies a Convention, the standards afforded under the Convention have to be reflected in national law and policy and become thereby applicable law in the country. The same procedure of ratification applies to the Conventions of the Council of Europe and the Hague Conference of Private International Law. In addition to the Member States of these inter-governmental organisations, non-Member States can also accede to the Conventions.

=== The UN Convention on the Rights of the Child ===
The UN Convention on the Rights of the Child defines the human rights of children and the correlated obligations of states. It provides also for obligations of parents and caregivers, public authorities, private service providers and the private sector. These rights and obligations can guide caseworkers and case officers in all measures, decisions and considerations for children on the move. The convention supports caseworkers and officers in navigating the complex body of international, European and national laws. It provides the overarching framework and the strongest point of reference for safeguarding children.

The convention is complemented by three Optional Protocols, one on the sale of children, child prostitution and child pornography, another one on the involvement of children in armed conflict, and a third and more recent Protocol on a communications procedure for children. States that have ratified the Convention report to the Committee on the Rights of the Child, the international Treaty Body mandated to monitor the implementation of the convention by States Parties. The Committee reviews and comments on State Party reports on the implementation of the Convention and develops General Comments, in which it elaborates on specific articles of the convention.

=== The Hague Conference on Private International Law ===
The Hague Conference on Private International Law (HCCH) is a global inter-governmental organisation that has developed standards for the transnational cooperation on child protection and family matters. The key themes addressed by the Conventions of the Hague Conference include transnational child protection, inter-country adoption, cross-border parental child abduction as well as matters of parental responsibility and contact involving different countries.

The Hague Conventions in the area of transnational child protection and family law have several common characteristics. They ensure the automatic mutual recognition of official decisions taken by one Contracting State in other Contracting States. They enable and facilitate the cooperation between the Contracting States, including through the establishment of central authorities and the development of unified procedures. By facilitating practical matters, such as the translation of documents, information exchange and the use of standardised model forms, the Conventions aim to simplify and expedite cross-border procedures and the enforcement of official decisions.

The Hague Conventions are innovative as they work primarily with the concept of habitual residence of the child, rather than nationality, in order to determine which state has the jurisdiction over a case.

=== The UN Refugee Convention and its Protocol ===
The UN Refugee Convention and its Protocol regulate the right of persons to seek international protection. Children enjoy special safeguards and have a right to have their asylum application examined individually. Child-specific grounds of persecution need to be considered irrespective of whether the child applies alone or together with a parent or caregiver. The European Union Member States have re-elaborated these standards for the EU context and have adopted a series of Directives regulating the qualification and reception conditions of asylum seekers in the EU as well as asylum procedures and matters of return.

== Council of Europe ==
=== The European Social Charter ===
The European Social Charter sets out rights and freedoms and establishes a supervisory mechanism mandated to monitor how States Parties implement the Charter in practice. The rights afforded under the Charter concern all individuals in their daily lives as they relate, for instance, to housing, health, education, employment, legal and social protection, free movement of persons and non-discrimination. The Charter was first adopted in 1961 and was subsequently revised. The 1996 revised European Social Charter entered into force in 1999.

The European Committee of Social Rights issued in October 2015 a Statement of interpretation on the rights of refugees under the European Social Charter, which provides guidance on the application of the European Social Charter to refugees and asylum seekers.

=== Council of Europe Convention on the Protection of Children against Sexual Exploitation and Sexual Abuse (2007) ===
The Council of Europe Convention on the Protection of Children against Sexual Exploitation and Sexual Abuse is the first instrument to establish the various forms of sexual abuse and exploitation of children as criminal offences, including abuse committed in the home or family, with the use of force, coercion or threats. Preventive measures outlined in the Convention include the screening, recruitment and training of persons working in contact with children, making children aware of the risks and teaching them to protect themselves, as well as monitoring measures for offenders and potential offenders.

The convention also establishes programmes to support victims, encourages people to report suspected sexual exploitation and abuse, and sets up telephone and internet helplines for children. It ensures that certain types of conduct are classified as criminal offences, such as engaging in sexual activities with a child below the legal age and the sexual exploitation of children in prostitution and pornography. The Convention criminalises the solicitation of children for sexual purposes (child grooming) and by travelling sex offenders who can be prosecuted for some offences even when the act is committed abroad. The Convention ensures that child victims are protected during judicial proceedings, for example with regard to their identity and privacy.

=== Council of Europe Convention on Action against Trafficking in Human Beings (2005) ===
The Council of Europe Convention on Action against Trafficking in Human Beings is a comprehensive treaty mainly focused on the protection of victims of trafficking and the safeguard of their rights. It also aims at preventing trafficking as well as prosecuting traffickers. The Convention applies to all forms of trafficking; whether national or transnational, whether or not related to organised crime and whoever the victim, women, men or children and whatever the form of exploitation, sexual exploitation, forced labour or services, or other.

The Convention provides for the setting up of an independent monitoring mechanism (GRETA), which monitors the States Parties' compliance with its provisions.

== European Union ==
=== Directives – EU law ===
Within the European Union, EU Directives are legally binding and constitute EU law that needs to be transposed into the national law of Member States within a prescribed period of time. When countries infringe against or violate European standards that are in force within the country, the European Courts offer the possibility to seek legal remedy and to claim the rights afforded under international or European law.

==== Reception Conditions Directive ====
The Council Directive 2003/9/EC of 27 January 2003 laying down minimum standards for the reception of asylum seekers sets out minimum reception standards for asylum applicants. The aim is to ensure that the applicants have a dignified standard of living and that comparable living conditions are afforded to them in all Member States. At the same time, the Directive also limits asylum applicants' secondary movements.

==== Asylum Procedures Directive ====
The Directive 2013/32/EU of the European Parliament and of the Council of 26 June 2013 on common procedures for granting and withdrawing international protection repealed Directive 2005/85/EC on minimum standards on procedures for granting and withdrawing refugee status in European Union countries and sets up EU-wide procedures for granting and withdrawing international protection (refugee status and the protection given to people who are not refugees but who would risk serious harm if returned to their country of origin).

==== Qualification Directive ====
The full name of the Qualification Directive is the Directive 2011/95/EU of the European Parliament and of the Council of 13 December 2011 on standards for the qualification of third-country nationals or stateless persons as beneficiaries of international protection, for a uniform status for refugees or for persons eligible for subsidiary protection, and for the content of the protection granted.

The Qualification Directive establishes common grounds to grant international protection. Its provisions also foresee a series of rights on protection from non refoulement, residence permits, travel documents, access to employment, access to education, social welfare, healthcare, access to accommodation, access to integration facilities, as well as specific provisions for children and vulnerable persons.

==== Dublin III Regulation ====
With the full name Regulation (EU) No 604/2013 of the European Parliament and of the Council of 26 June 2013 establishing the criteria and mechanisms for determining the Member State responsible for examining an application for international protection lodged in one of the Member States by a third-country national or a stateless person.

Regulation (EU) No 604/2013 (Dublin III Council Regulation), replacing Council Regulation (EC) No 343/2003 (Dublin II Regulation), lays down the criteria and mechanisms for determining which EU country is responsible for examining an asylum application.

==== Return Directive ====
The Directive 2008/115/EC of the European Parliament and of the Council of 16 December 2008 on common standards and procedures in Member States for returning illegally staying third-country nationals establishes common standards and procedures for EU countries, whereby illegally staying non-EU nationals may be removed from their territories. It lays down provisions for terminating illegal stays, detaining non-EU nationals with the aim of removing them and procedural safeguards.

==== Family Reunification Directive ====
The purpose of the Council Directive 2003/86/EC of 22 September 2003 on the right to family reunification is to determine the conditions under which non-EU nationals residing lawfully on the territory of EU countries may exercise the right to family reunification. The Directive aims to establish common rules of law relating to the right to family reunification. The intention is to enable family members of non-EU nationals residing lawfully on the territory of the European Union (EU) to join them in the EU country in which they are residing. The objective is to protect the family unit and to facilitate the integration of nationals of non-member countries. The Directive does not apply to Ireland, Denmark and the United Kingdom. In addition, it does not preclude any more favourable conditions recognised by national legislation.

==== Conditions of admission of third-country nationals for the purposes of studies, pupil exchange, unremunerated training or voluntary service ====
The aim of the Council Directive 2004/114/EC of 13 December 2004 on the conditions of admission of third-country nationals for the purposes of studies, pupil exchange, unremunerated training or voluntary service is to harmonise national legislation relating to the conditions of admission of third-country nationals for the purposes of studies, pupil exchange, unremunerated training or voluntary service.

==== Right of Union citizens and their family members to move and reside freely within the territory of the Member States ====
European Parliament and Council Directive 2004/38/EC of 29 April 2004 on the right of citizens of the Union and their family members to move and reside freely within the territory of the Member States brings together the piecemeal measures found in the complex body of legislation that had previously governed this matter. The measures are designed, among other things, to encourage citizens to exercise their right to move and reside freely within EU countries, to cut back administrative formalities to the bare essentials, to provide a better definition of the status of family members, to limit the scope for refusing entry or terminating the right of residence and to introduce a new right of permanent residence.

==== Brussels II bis Regulation ====
Council Regulation (EC) No 2201/2003 of 27 November 2003 concerning jurisdiction and the recognition and enforcement of judgments in matrimonial matters and the matters of parental responsibility brings together in a single legal instrument the provisions on divorce and parental responsibility, with a view to facilitating the work of judges and legal practitioners and to regulating the exercise of cross-border rights of access. This regulation represents a major step forward in the fight against abductions of children.

==== Directive on combating sexual abuse and exploitation of children ====
Directive 2011/93/EU of the European Parliament and of the Council of 13 December 2011 on combating the sexual abuse and sexual exploitation of children and child pornography, and replacing Council Framework Decision 2004/68/JHA is aimed at combating sexual offences committed against children. The Directive covers different aspects such as sanctions, prevention, and assistance for victims. Specific provisions are provided concerning child pornography on the Internet and sex tourism.

==== 2011 Anti-Trafficking Directive ====
Directive 2011/36/EU of the European Parliament and of the Council of 5 April 2011 on preventing and combating trafficking in human beings and protecting its victims, and replacing Council Framework Decision 2002/629/JHA. This directive establishes rules across the European Union to address trafficking in human beings.

==== Residence permits for victims of human trafficking ====
Council Directive 2004/81/EC of 29 April 2004 on the residence permit issued to third-country nationals who are victims of trafficking in human beings or who have been the subject of an action to facilitate illegal immigration, who cooperate with the competent authorities states that residence permits of temporary duration may be issued to non-EU nationals who are victims of trafficking in human beings or (optionally) the subject of an illegal immigration action. It is hoped that this will encourage them to cooperate with the competent authorities whilst providing them with adequate protection.

==== Victims' Directive ====
Directive 2012/29/EU of the European Parliament and of the Council of 25 October 2012 establishing minimum standards on the rights, support and protection of victims of crime, and replacing Council Framework Decision 2001/220/JH establishes minimum standards on the rights, support and protection of victims of crime ensures that persons who have fallen victim of crime are recognised, treated with respect and receive proper protection, support and access to justice. The Directive replaces the 2001 Framework Decision on the standing of victims in criminal proceedings and considerably strengthens the rights of victims and their family members to information, support and protection and victims' procedural rights in criminal proceedings. The Directive also requires that the Member States ensure appropriate training on victims' needs for officials who are likely to come into contact with victims and encourage cooperation between Member States and coordination of national services of their actions on victims' rights.

=== European Commission Communications, Resolutions and Action Plans ===
==== EU Action Plan on Unaccompanied Minors (2010-2014) ====
Communication from the Commission to the European Parliament and the Council of 6 May 2010 – Action Plan on Unaccompanied Minors (2010 – 2014) COM(2010) 213 final provides a common approach to tackling the challenges relating to the arrival in the European Union (EU) of large numbers of unaccompanied minors. The action plan is based on the principle of the best interests of the child.

==== EU Migration Policy ====
Communication from the Commission to the European Parliament, the Council, the Economic and Social Committee and the Committee of the Regions of 4 May 2011, COM(2011) 248 presents a set of measures aimed at establishing a comprehensive European migration policy, founded on greater solidarity between Member States and enabling the European Union (EU) to respond better to the challenges presented by migration.

==== Migration and development ====
Communication from the Commission to the Council, the European Parliament, the European Economic and Social Committee and the Committee of the Regions - migration and development: some concrete orientations COM(2005) 390 recognises migration as a powerful - though challenging - development vehicle in both the country of origin and destination. As a global phenomenon, it cannot be managed by the EU alone, and to identify common interests and challenges, the EU dialogues with partner countries, including countries of origin and transit.

==== Policy Plan on Asylum ====
Communication from the Commission to the European Parliament, the Council, the European Economic and Social Committee and the Committee of the Regions of 17 June 2008 – Policy Plan on Asylum: An integrated approach to protection across the EU [COM(2008) 360 final – Not published in the Official Journal]. is a policy plan that provides the road-map for completing the second phase of the Common European Asylum System (CEAS). It is based on a three-pronged strategy that focuses on the harmonisation of protection standards, practical cooperation and solidarity.

==== European Pact on Immigration and Asylum ====
The European Pact on Immigration and Asylum of 24 September 2008 is intended to be the basis for European Union immigration and asylum policies in a spirit of mutual responsibility and solidarity between Member States and a renewed partnership with non-EU countries.

==== European Asylum Support Office ====
Regulation (EU) No 439/2010 of the European Parliament and of the Council of 19 May 2010 establishing a European Asylum Support Office establishes a European Asylum Support Office to strengthen cooperation between the Member States in this area and assist them in coping with crisis situations.

==== EU Agenda for the Rights of the Child (2011) ====
Communication from the Commission to the European Parliament, the Council, the European Economic and Social Committee and the Committee of the Regions of 15 February 2011 – An EU Agenda for the Rights of the Child COM(2011) 60 final aims at strengthening the promotion and protection of the rights of the child by implementing the principles laid down in the Charter of Fundamental Rights of the European Union (EU) and international standards in this field. It consists of a series of actions intended to foster an increase in the attention paid to the well-being and protection of children in Union policies.

==== EU Strategy towards the Eradication of Trafficking in Human Beings (2012-2016) ====
The Communication from the Commission to the European Parliament, the Council, the European Economic and Social Committee and the Committee of the Regions, The EU Strategy towards the Eradication of Trafficking in Human Beings 2012–2016 sets out measures and actions to support the implementation of the 2011 EU Anti-Trafficking Directive. It is structured around the following priority areas: Identifying, protecting and assisting victims of trafficking; strengthening prevention; increased prosecution; enhanced coordination and cooperation among key actors; and increased knowledge of and effective response to emerging concerns related to all forms of trafficking in human beings.

==== Combating trafficking in human beings, the sexual exploitation of children and child pornography ====
Communication from the Commission to the Council and the European Parliament on combating trafficking in human beings and combating the sexual exploitation of children and child pornography introduces effective measures to address the whole trafficking chain of recruiters, transporters, exploiters and clients.

==== Search for missing or sexually exploited children ====
The Council Resolution on the contribution of civil society in finding missing or sexually exploited children aims to encourage cooperation between civil society organisations and the competent authorities in finding missing or sexually exploited children.

==== Eurodac ====
Council Regulation No 2725/2000 of 11 December 2000 concerning the establishment of 'Eurodac' for the comparison of fingerprints for the effective application of the Dublin Convention establishes Eurodac, a system for comparing fingerprints of asylum seekers and some categories of illegal immigrants. It facilitates the application of the Dublin II Regulation, which makes it possible to determine the European Union (EU) country responsible for examining an asylum application.

== Conflicting mandates ==
In the public debate on international migration, the mandates and interests of different agencies and disciplines can sometimes appear to be in conflict. International human rights standards provide the common basis for decision makers. In the context of children, the UN Convention on the Rights of the Child provides the basis for promoting the best interests of children in all contexts and situations.

== Non-legally binding standards ==
In addition to legally binding conventions, treaties and directives, the UN, the Council of Europe and the European Union have developed a large number of political recommendations, regulations and guidelines, which are not legally binding but have nonetheless an important value as they aid in the interpretation and implementation of legal standards.

== See also ==
- Child labour
- Commercial sexual exploitation of children
- Convention on the Rights of the Child
- Child trafficking
- International child abduction
- Palermo protocols
- United Nations Global Initiative to Fight Human Trafficking
- Trafficking of children
- Transnational child protection
