= Children's participation =

Principle in child rights

Children's participation is a child's right to be heard in all matters affecting them, as defined by the UN Convention on the Rights of the Child. According to Article 12 of the convention, children have the right to express their views in matters affecting them and their views have to be given due weight in accordance with the age and maturity of the child. This right applies equally to children's participation in social and political matters as well as in judicial and administrative proceedings. As a general principle, the child's right to be heard reflects the concept of children's 'agency', viewing children not only as vulnerable persons in need of special protection, but also as informed decision makers, rights holders and active members of society.

The right to be heard under Article 12 relates closely to other articles under the convention, which together form the so-called 'participatory rights' of children and underline the understanding of children as citizens who are rights holders. These articles include:

- Article 13 – the child's right to seek, receive and impart information
- Article 14 – freedom of thought, conscience and religion
- Article 15 – freedom of association.

== Enabling factors ==
=== Trust ===
Trust is a key element of encouraging a child to express their views. Strategies for building trust with children include:

- Demonstrate that you care for and respect the child as a person.
- Ask the girl or boy how she or he is, how she or he feels about where they are living and their life situation, ask if there is anything she or he needs.
- Engage in a gentle conversation with the child about day-to-day matters.
- Show empathy and express positive feelings. Talk to the child about things that are important to the child and that interest her or him.
- Sense if the child is comfortable talking with you, reassure the child and give the child a feeling of control of what is happening.
- Make the meeting room child-friendly.
- Introduce yourself and explain your professional role.
- Explain the purpose of your meeting and what the meeting is about, why you are there to talk to the child and what will happen afterwards.
- Allocate sufficient time to speak to the child and to listen.
- Provide quality interpretation and cultural mediation wherever required.
- Give the child time to reflect about the information you shared, to digest it and to come back for a second or third meeting, if and as required and appropriate.
- Ask the child if she or he has understood the information and to explain what they understood, and take time to ask the questions you need to ask.

=== Age-sensitive communication ===
In the cases of younger children or children with impaired cognitive skills, the child's participation can be through drawing or play, or by observing of the child's behaviour with family members and care staff. Adapting the language to the age and development of the child helps insure the child can understand the issues at stake and express her or his feelings and views.

National laws usually define age limits for children to have the right to contact social services on their own initiative, to be heard in judicial and administrative procedures, to act as a litigant or party to a case, to appeal against decisions, and to complain and seek redress. The age limits defined under national law differ among countries and, in some cases, also between the various laws applying to different groups of children and contexts. The right of younger children to be heard is often not addressed in the same way as the right of adolescents. Special measures nationally can ensure younger children are not excluded from exercising their right to be heard.

=== Gender considerations for the right to be heard ===
For some children, the gender of the interviewer, interpreter, cultural mediator, guardian or care staff may change their willingness to express themselves. The may depend on the experiences that children have with men and women in their homes and communities, and if in migration, during their journey or in places of destination. Traditional gender roles and relations can also play a role. The gender identity of the child should be respected.

== Enabling factors in transnational cases ==
Many children do not want to tell their story to the authorities because they fear it might not be in their interest and might lead to unwanted consequences, such as being returned. Children might have been instructed or even threatened by third persons to only tell parts of their story, and the child might not trust the police and local authorities can protect them. A reception system that respects and upholds the dignity of the child can foster a sense of trust.

== Quality interpretation and cultural mediation ==
Interpreters can influence the information gathering process in transnational child protection cases, asylum procedures and criminal investigations as they affect how the child's disclosure is being understood and perceived. Inaccurate translation might compromise the child's statement to the effect that decisions are taken on the basis of incorrect information. This relates not only to the content translated but also to the style and semantic choices made by the child and how these are rendered by the interpreters.

In addition to training and recruiting qualified interpreters, the following measures protect the child's right to be heard:

- Clarify which authority is responsible for providing interpretation.
- Make the participation of an interpreter mandatory whenever a child does not master the official language of the interview.
- Avoid the use of informal interpreters, such as family members, other children, other asylum seekers or staff.
- Use telephone interpretation when a qualified and suitable interpreter is not available locally.
- Train law enforcement officers, immigration officials and other interviewers as well as the interpreters on how to collaborate in the context of interviews with children.
- Develop standard procedures to ensure quality and ethical standards of interpretation and confidentiality.
- Train interpreters to act also as cultural mediators.

== Hearing a child in investigations and proceedings ==
Child victims of crime have a right to be protected from harm and secondary victimisation during investigations and proceedings. The standards for are described in the UN Guidelines on Justice in Matters Involving Child Victims and Witnesses of Crime, the Council of Europe Convention on the Protection of Children against Sexual Exploitation and Sexual Abuse and the 2011 EU Anti-Trafficking Directive. The following protect children from harm in investigations and proceedings:

- Repeat interviews during the investigation, prosecution and trial only when necessary.
- Use video recorded interviews or similar to avoid the child victim or witness giving evidence in open court and to prevent visual contact between victims, witnesses and defendants.
- Specifically trained professionals conduct the interviews with child, preferably the same person each time.
- Conduct interviews in a child-friendly environment.

The Children's House model is a good practice for conducting forensic interviews and gathering evidence from child victims of crime, the Council of Europe Convention on the Protection of Children against Sexual Exploitation and Sexual Abuse and the 2011 EU Anti-Trafficking Directive.

== Forensic interviews ==
Interview style and the type of questions asked affect the quality of the interview. They can influence the child's willingness to disclose information. They can also influence the type and quality of information, and the level of detail, that the child is able and willing to share. Strategies for interviewers and interpreters to lessen this include prioritising open questions and avoiding closed and focused questions, suggestive prompts and leading questions; remaining neutral; be open and empathic; avoid criticism and confrontations.

== Regional and national examples ==
Children's councils in Colombia provide children with an opportunity to speak up for their rights.

== See also ==
- Best interests
- Youth participation
- Child integration
- Children's rights
