= International Social Service =

International non-governmental organization

The International Social Service (ISS) is an international non-governmental organization (NGO) founded in 1924. It provides assistance in resolving international child protection cases.

The ISS is organised as a global network of over 120 countries which assist children and families confronted with complex social problems as a result of migration. This is in addition to a General Secretariat based in Geneva.

The ISS is accredited to the United Nations Economic and Social Council (ECOSOC).

== History ==
The ISS was founded as the 'International Migration Service' in 1924. It was initially established in London by the World YWCA under the Chairmanship of Lady Dorothy Gladstone. Its headquarters moved from London to Geneva in 1925, where it has remained since.

== Present day ==
The ISS aims to ensure that respect for human rights is accorded to every individual across international borders, especially children. As such, it is concerned with a number of areas, including:

- Forced migrations (child trafficking, conflict, wars, asylum)
- Voluntary migrations
- International adoptions
- Child abduction (inter-country divorce or separation)
- Unaccompanied/orphan child (death or separation)

The services which ISS provides include:

- Inter-country social and legal assistance
- Family tracing
- Pre- and post-adoption assistance
- International family mediation
- Child protection in family separation
- Protection and care of unaccompanied minors
- Alternative/foster care
- Search of origins

== Structure ==
The ISS is a global network spanning over 120 countries. These consist of 'Branches', 'Affiliated Bureaus' and 'Correspondents'. Prominent members exist in Australia, Canada, Germany, Hong Kong, Switzerland, UK (known as Children and Families Across Borders) and the US.

The organisations that the ISS collaborates with include:

- National and local child protection agencies
- National and local governments and courts
- NGOs with similar mission and activities
- Family support services
- Public and private immigration services
- Public and private missing children agencies
- Individual social service practitioners
- Law enforcement agencies, practitioners and firms
- Mediation practitioners
- Psychology and health practitioners
