= Cultural mediation =

Mechanism of human development

Cultural mediation is one of the fundamental mechanisms of distinctly human development according to cultural–historical psychological theory introduced by Lev Vygotsky and developed in the work of his numerous followers worldwide.

== Introduction ==
Vygotsky investigated child development and how this was guided by the role of culture and interpersonal communication. Vygotsky observed how higher mental functions developed through social interactions with significant people in a child's life, particularly parents, but also other adults. Through these interactions, a child came to learn the habits of mind of her/his culture, including speech patterns, written language, and other symbolic knowledge through which the child derives meaning and affects a child's construction of his or her knowledge. This key premise of Vygotskian psychology is often referred to as "cultural mediation". The specific knowledge gained by a child through these interactions also represented the shared knowledge of a culture. This process is known as internalization.

== Example ==
The easiest way to understand mediation is to start with an example and follow with the Vygotskian principles behind it.

At a North American girl's fourth birthday, she sits at the table with friends and family. As the candles on her birthday cake are lit and it is placed on the table, the child gains a feeling of deeply felt joy. This is not only because she knows the cake is sweet and she likes sweet food, nor that the candles' sparkling is pleasing to her eyes. While these would be sufficient reason to arouse an emotional response in an ape, there are mental processes in a four-year-old that extend well beyond this. She patiently waits as her family and friends sing "Happy Birthday to You". The joy is not in the cake itself but in the cake's specific meaning to her. It is a sign that today is a special day for her in which she is the center of attention and that her friends and family are praising her. It's also a sign that she is bigger and as such has higher status among her peers. It's not just a cake, it is a birthday cake and, more specifically, it is her own. The true significance of the birthday cake then, is not in its physical properties at all, but rather in the significance bestowed upon it by the culture the daughter is growing into. This is not restricted to such artifacts as a birthday cake. A classroom, a game of soccer, a fire engine are all first and foremost cultural artifacts from which children derive meaning.

This example can help us understand Vygotsky's approach to human development. Like animals, we have lower mental functions tied closely to biological processes. In our birthday cake example, a toddler may well have reached out to take a handful of cream from the cake as soon as she saw it and the four-year-old may have been tempted to do the same. In humans, however, lower mental functions facilitate a new line of development qualitatively unique to humans. Vygotsky referred to this as the higher mental functions. The lower mental functions cannot be equated to those of an ape as they are interwoven with the line of higher mental functions and are essential to them.

"The history of child behavior is born from the interweaving of these two lines. The history of the development of the higher mental functions is impossible without a study of their prehistory, their biological roots, and their organic disposition." (Vygotsky, 1978, p. 46)

However, it is this higher line of development that explains the birthday cake example with profound insight.

From the perspective of an individual child's development, the higher psychological line of development is one guided by the development of tools and signs within the culture. In our example above, the birthday cake is much more than a source of nourishment, it is a sign with much deeper and broader meaning. The sign mediates between the immediate sensory input and the child's response, and in so doing allows for a moment of reflection and self-regulation that would not otherwise be possible. To the extent that these signs can be used to influence or change our physical or social environment they are tools. Even the birthday cake can be considered as a tool in that the parents use it to establish that their daughter is now older and has a new status in society.

The cake is a sophisticated example. Tools and signs can be much simpler, such as an infant pointing to an object she desires. At first she may simply be trying to reach the object, but the mother's response of passing the object helps the infant realize that the action of pointing is a tool to change the environment according to her needs. It is from these simple inter-subjective beginnings that the world of meaning in the child mediated by tools and signs, including language, develops.

A fundamental premise of Vygotsky's therefore, is that tools and signs are first and foremost shared between individuals in society and only then can they be internalized by individuals developing in the society as is reflected in this famous quote:

"Every function in the child's cultural development appears twice: first, on the social level, and later on the individual level; first, between people (interpsychological), and then inside the child (intrapsychological). This applies equally to voluntary attention, to logical memory, and to the formation of concepts. All the higher functions originate as actual relations between human individuals." (Vygotsky, 1978, p. 57)
