= United Nations Global Initiative to Fight Human Trafficking =

The United Nations Global Initiative to Fight Human Trafficking (stylized UN.GIFT) is a multi-stakeholder initiative providing global access to expertise, knowledge and innovative partnerships to combat human trafficking.

UN.GIFT was conceived to promote the global fight on human trafficking, on the basis of international agreements reached at the UN. To date, 167 countries are parties to the Protocol to Prevent, Suppress and Punish Trafficking in Persons, especially Women and Children, which supplements the United Nations Convention against Transnational Organized Crime.

UN.GIFT was launched in March 2007 by the UN Office on Drugs and Crime (UNODC) with a grant made on behalf of the United Arab Emirates. It is managed in cooperation with the International Labour Organization (ILO); the International Organization for Migration (IOM); the UN Children's Fund (UNICEF); the Office of the High Commissioner for Human Rights (OHCHR); and the Organization for Security and Co-operation in Europe (OSCE).

UN.GIFT works with all stakeholders - governments, businesses, academia, civil societies and the media - to support each other's work, create new partnerships and develop effective tools to fight human trafficking.

The Global Initiative is based on a simple principle: human trafficking is a crime of such magnitude and atrocity that it cannot be dealt with successfully by any government alone. This global problem requires a global, multi-stakeholder strategy that builds on national efforts throughout the world.

To pave the way for this strategy, stakeholders must coordinate efforts already underway, increase knowledge and awareness, provide technical assistance; promote effective rights-based responses; build the capacity of state and non-state stakeholders; foster partnerships for joint action; and above all, ensure that everybody takes responsibility for this fight.

By encouraging and facilitating cooperation and coordination, the UN.GIFT aims to create synergies among the anti-trafficking activities of UN agencies, international organizations and other stakeholders to develop the most efficient and cost-effective approach to fight human trafficking.

== Mission ==
UN.GIFT mobilizes State and non-state actors to eradicate human trafficking by:

(a) Reducing both the vulnerability of potential victims and the demand for exploitation in all its forms;

(b) Ensuring adequate protection and support to those who do fall victim; and

(c) Supporting the efficient prosecution of the criminals involved, while respecting the fundamental human rights of all persons.

In carrying out its mission, UN.GIFT will increase knowledge and awareness of human trafficking; promote effective rights-based responses; build the capacity of State and non-state actors; and foster partnerships for joint action against human trafficking.

== Goals ==
1. To foster awareness, global commitment and action to counter human trafficking in partnership with different stakeholders including governments, the international community, non-governmental organizations and other elements of civil society and the media; and

2. To assist countries in creating and strengthening support structures for victims of trafficking.

The core areas of UN.GIFT's work are: 1. Global and collective advocacy efforts to help raise awareness of human trafficking; 2. Evidence-based knowledge on human trafficking to feed into national, regional and global policy-making; 3. Greater coordination and cooperation among international organizations and innovative public-private partnerships; 4. System-wide, institutional and individual capacity development of stakeholders through the delivery of technical assistance.

== Steering Committee ==
The UN.GIFT alliance is composed of the six major international organizations providing technical know-how and expertise to Governments and non-governmental entities in addressing the human trafficking challenge. The UN.GIFT Steering Committee, comprising representatives from the six founding members and the main donor to UN.GIFT, coordinates anti-trafficking efforts of its members and their respective networks and alliances.

The UN.GIFT Steering Committee provides a unique opportunity to increase the impact of anti-trafficking responses supported by the UN and other organizations and to create synergies to ensure the most efficient and effective delivery of anti-trafficking activities.

International Labour Organization (ILO)

The mandate of ILO is to protect the interests of workers when employed in countries other than their own, noting that labour is not a commodity. The Conventions adopted by ILO that are of most relevance to human trafficking are those on forced labour, child labour and migrant workers. Other relevant ILO Conventions include those on gender equality and discrimination, employment policy, employment agencies, labour inspection, safety and health at work.

International Organization for Migration (IOM)

IOM has a comprehensive approach to counter trafficking in persons within the wider context of managing migration, providing an integrated response to prevent human trafficking, protecting the victims through targeted assistance and empowering governments and other agencies to combat this severe human rights violation more effectively.

IOM has implemented almost 500 counter-trafficking projects in 85 countries since 1994 and has provided assistance to over 15,000 trafficked persons. IOM's primary aims are to prevent human trafficking and protect victims of the trade by offering them options for safe and sustainable reintegration and/or return. IOM has developed over 400 partnerships with both state actors and civil society in the course of this work.

Office of the High Commissioner for Human Rights (OHCHR)

OHCHR's anti-trafficking program focuses on the integration of human rights into anti-trafficking initiatives at the legal, political and program levels. Its anti-trafficking work is based on a dual strategy that addresses prevention by focusing on the root causes creating vulnerability, such as economic disparities, conflict and discrimination, as well as reinforcing victim assistance and protection. In promoting and advocating a human rights-based approach to anti-trafficking, OHCHR is guided by two fundamental considerations: human rights must be at the core of any credible anti-trafficking strategy; and anti-trafficking initiatives must not in any way adversely affect the rights of trafficked persons or those vulnerable to trafficking.

Organization for Security and Co-operation in Europe (OSCE)

The fight against trafficking in human beings has become a priority of the OSCE, which applies the OSCE concept of common and comprehensive security and its three dimensions(politico-military, economic and human dimension) to address this grave crime and human rights violation. Since the late 1990s, the OSCE has created political and operational frameworks to combat human trafficking – political commitments adopted by the OSCE participating States from 2000 to 2008 and relevant structures designed to provide assistance to them in the implementation of these comprehensive Ministerial Decisions and anti-trafficking projects and programmes.

The Organization works closely with its 56 participating States to catalyse political will at the national level in countries of origin, transit and destination, to facilitate dialogue and better coordination and cooperation in combating all forms of trafficking in human beings, increase capacity building and involvement of all relevant stakeholders, be it state institutions or civil society, in developing zero tolerance towards slavery and exploitation of trafficked persons.

United Nations Children's Fund (UNICEF)

UNICEF's mandate to protect children from all forms of violence, abuse and exploitation is based on the Convention on the Rights of the Child. Children deprived of their rights are vulnerable to numerous forms of exploitation including trafficking and exposure to multiple forms of abuses, violence and exploitation including sexual exploitation, forced marriage, illegal adoption, and cheap or unpaid labour. Trafficking violates their rights to be protected, depriving them of the right to reach their full potential. The Optional Protocol to the CRC on the Sale of Children, Child Prostitution and Child Pornography provides added impetus to combat child trafficking.

United Nations Office on Drugs and Crime

UNODC has a general mandate to address transnational organized crime. The Trafficking in Persons Protocol, supplementing the UN Convention against Transnational Organized Crime (UNTOC), provides the legal and conceptual framework for UNODC's work in the area of human trafficking. It focuses on the criminal justice system response to human trafficking, and also includes further provisions on victim protection and preventive measures. UNODC serves as the secretariat of the Conference of the Parties to UNTOC and its protocols and for the Inter-Agency Coordination Group against Trafficking in Persons.

== UN.GIFT.HUB ==
The UN.GIFT virtual knowledge hub, UN.GIFT.HUB was developed in response to the need to gather all existing knowledge on human trafficking. In addition, it was designed to broaden this knowledge base by sharing experiences and information from all sectors. The UN.GIFT.HUB is an online space, not only to collect information but where users can participate in the creation and dissemination of knowledge.

== 2010 Business Leaders Award Against Human Trafficking ==
To honour business leaders who take an active stand against human trafficking, End Human Trafficking Now!, UN.GIFT and the United Nations Global Compact are jointly launching a new international award, "Business Leaders against Human Trafficking".

The award will recognize business leaders who make their commitment to combat human trafficking an integrated part of their business strategy and their efforts to ensure corporate sustainability.

Business leaders are uniquely placed to combat exploitative labour practices and to raise awareness of human trafficking among their workforces, suppliers, business partners, peers and even consumers. The award aims to reward creativity in identifying, preventing and combating human trafficking. Designed to stimulate businesses around the world to address the scourge of human trafficking, the award will commend business innovations in labour policies, supply chain management and corporate sustainability initiatives that help fight human trafficking.

The winners of the 2010 award were: Marylin Carlson Nelson, chairman, Carlson Companies; Robert Rigby-Hall, Senior Vice President, LexisNexis, Inc.; Christopher Davis, International Campaigns Director, Body Shop International
