= Refugee =

Displaced person

Refugees in 2024
Total population
- 122.6 million forcibly displaced, including: 72.1 million internally displaced; 8 million seeking asylum; 43.7 million refugees, of which: 32 million are under the mandate of United Nations High Commissioner for Refugees (UNHCR); 6 million are Palestinians under UNRWA's mandate, and; 5.8 million are others in need of international protection

Regions with significant populations
- Sub-Saharan Africa: 7.0 million
- Europe and North Asia: 12.4 million
- Asia and the Pacific: 6.8 million
- Middle East and North Africa: 2.4 million
- Americas: 800,000

Refugees by country of asylum per 1,000 people

Number of refugees per 100,000 by country of origin

A refugee, according to the United Nations High Commissioner for Refugees (UNHCR), is a person "forced to flee their own country and seek safety in another country. They are unable to return to their own country because of feared persecution as a result of who they are, what they believe in or say, or because of armed conflict, violence or serious public disorder." Such a person may be called an asylum seeker until granted refugee status by a contracting state or by the UNHCR if they formally make a claim for asylum.

Internally Displaced People (IDPs) are often called refugees, but they are distinguished from refugees because they have not crossed an international border, although their reasons for leaving their home may be the same as those of refugees.

== Etymology and usage ==
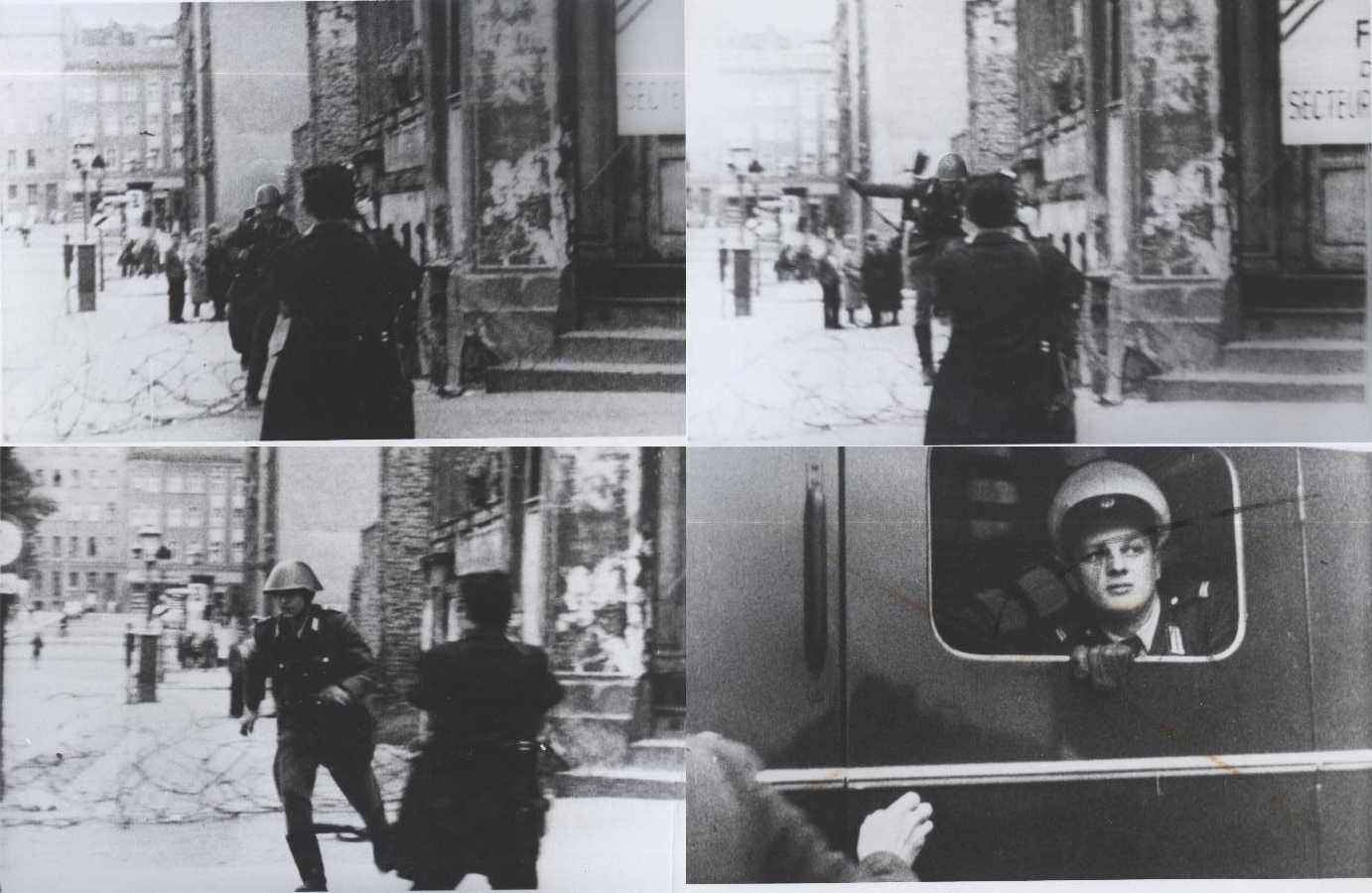
Konrad Schumann, an East German border guard, fleeing East Germany towards West Germany in 1962

In English, the term refugee derives from the root word refuge, from Old French refuge, meaning "hiding place". It refers to "shelter or protection from danger or distress", from Latin fugere, "to flee", and refugium, "a taking [of] refuge, place to flee back to". In Western history, the term was first applied to French Protestant Huguenots looking for a safe place against Catholic persecution after the first Edict of Fontainebleau in 1540. The word appeared in the English language when French Huguenots fled to Britain in large numbers after the 1685 Edict of Fontainebleau (the revocation of the 1598 Edict of Nantes) in France and the 1687 Declaration of Indulgence in England and Scotland. The word meant "one seeking asylum", until around 1916, when it evolved to mean "one fleeing home", applied in this instance to civilians in Flanders heading west to escape fighting in World War I.

== Definitions ==
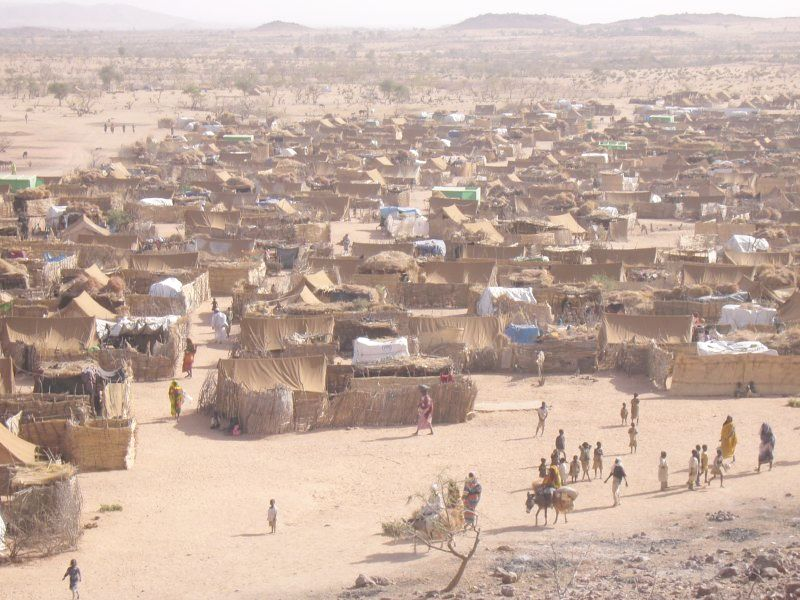
Darfur refugee camp in Chad, 2005

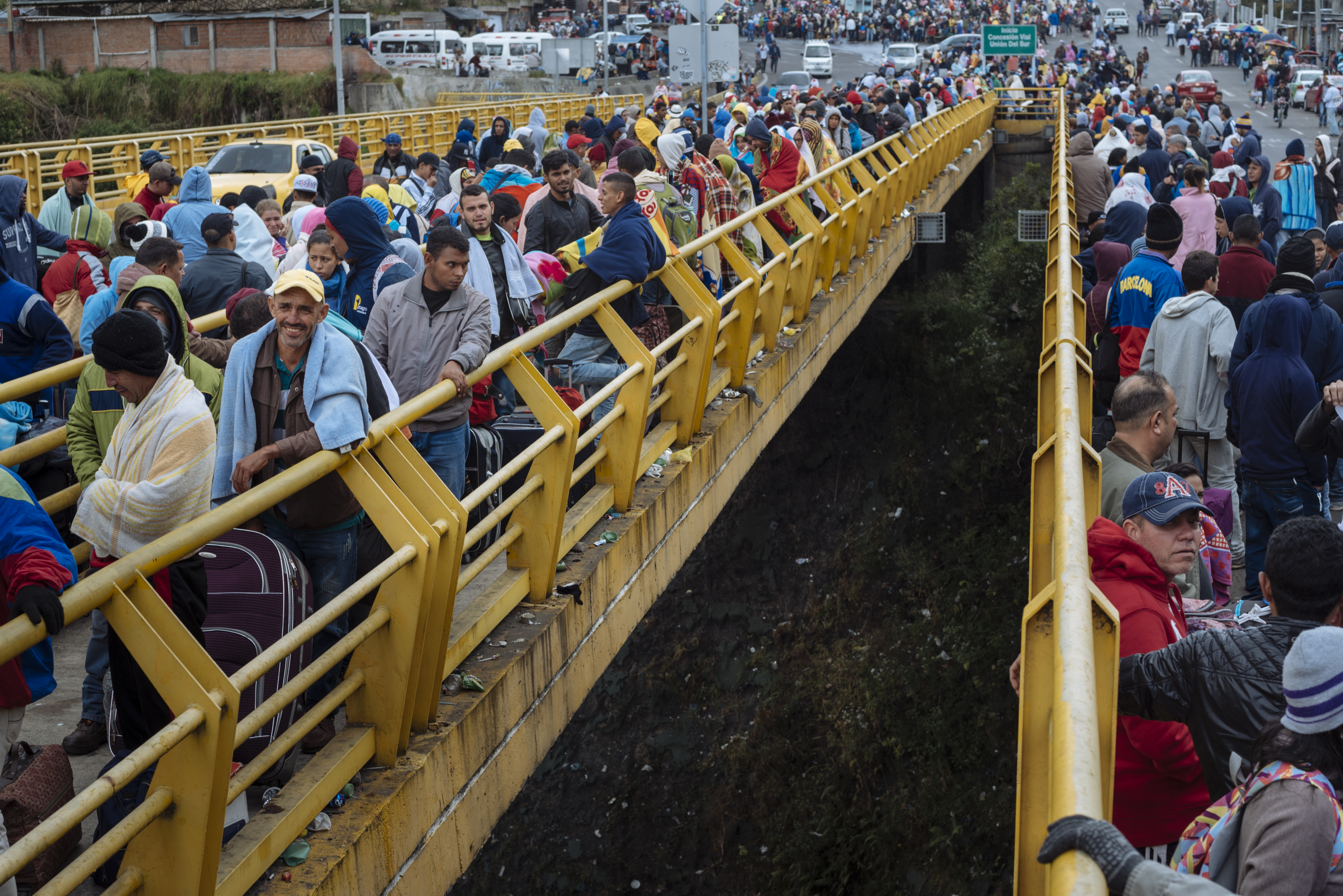
Hundreds of Venezuelan refugees waiting to have their passports stamped at an Ecuadorian border crossing, 2018

The first modern definition of an international refugee status came when the League of Nations established its Commission for Refugees in 1921. Following World War II (1939 to 1945) and in response to the large numbers of people fleeing Eastern Europe, the United Nations passed the 1951 Convention Relating to the Status of Refugees. It defines "refugee" in Article 1.A.2 as any person who:

owing to well-founded fear of being persecuted for reasons of race, religion, nationality, membership of a particular social group or political opinion, is outside the country of his nationality and is unable or, owing to such fear, is unwilling to avail himself of the protection of that country; or who, not having a nationality and being outside the country of his former habitual residence as a result of such events, is unable or, owing to such fear, is unwilling to return to it.

In 1967 the definition was basically confirmed by the Protocol Relating to the Status of Refugees.

People fleeing from war, natural disasters, or poverty are generally not encompassed by the international right of asylum. However, many countries have implemented laws to protect these Displaced Persons also. Accordingly, the Convention Governing the Specific Aspects of Refugee Problems in Africa expanded the 1951 definition, which the Organization of African Unity adopted in 1969:

Every person who, owing to external aggression, occupation, foreign domination or events seriously disturbing public order in either part or the whole of his country of origin or nationality, is compelled to leave his place of habitual residence in order to seek refuge in another place outside his country of origin or nationality.

The 1984 the regional, non-binding Latin-American Cartagena Declaration on Refugees included the following definition of refugees:

persons who have fled their country because their lives, safety or freedom have been threatened by generalized violence, foreign aggression, internal conflicts, massive violation of human rights or other circumstances which have seriously disturbed public order.

As of 2011 the United Nations High Commissioner for Refugees (UNHCR) itself, in addition to the 1951 definition, recognizes the following persons as refugees:

who are outside their country of nationality or habitual residence and unable to return there owing to serious and indiscriminate threats to life, physical integrity or freedom resulting from generalized violence or events seriously disturbing public order.

The European Union passed minimum standards as part of its definition of "refugee", underlined by article 2 (c) of Directive No. 2004/83/EC, essentially reproducing the narrow definition of refugee offered by the UN 1951 Convention. Nevertheless, by virtue of articles 2 (e) and 15 of the same Directive, persons who have fled a war-caused generalized violence are, under certain conditions, eligible for a complementary form of protection, called subsidiary protection. The same form of protection is foreseen for displaced people who, without being refugees, are nevertheless exposed, if returned to their countries of origin, to the death penalty, torture, or other inhuman or degrading treatments.

== Related terms ==
Refugee resettlement is defined as "an organized process of selection, transfer and arrival of individuals to another country. This definition is restrictive, as it does not account for the increasing prevalence of unmanaged migration processes."

Refugee relocation refers to "a non‐organized process of individual transfer to another country."

Refugee settlement means "the process of basic adjustment to life ‒ often in the early stages of transition to the new country ‒ including securing access to housing, education, healthcare, documentation and legal rights [and] employment is sometimes included in this process, but the focus is generally on short‐term survival needs rather than long‐term career planning."

Refugee integration means "a dynamic, long‐term process in which a newcomer becomes a full and equal participant in the receiving society... Compared to the general construct of settlement, refugee integration has a greater focus on social, cultural and structural dimensions. This process includes the acquisition of legal rights, mastering the language and culture, reaching safety and stability, developing social connections and establishing the means and markers of integration, such as employment, housing and health."

Refugee workforce integration means "a process in which refugees engage in economic activities (employment or self‐employment) which are commensurate with individuals' professional goals and previous qualifications and experience, and provide adequate economic security and prospects for career advancement."

== History ==
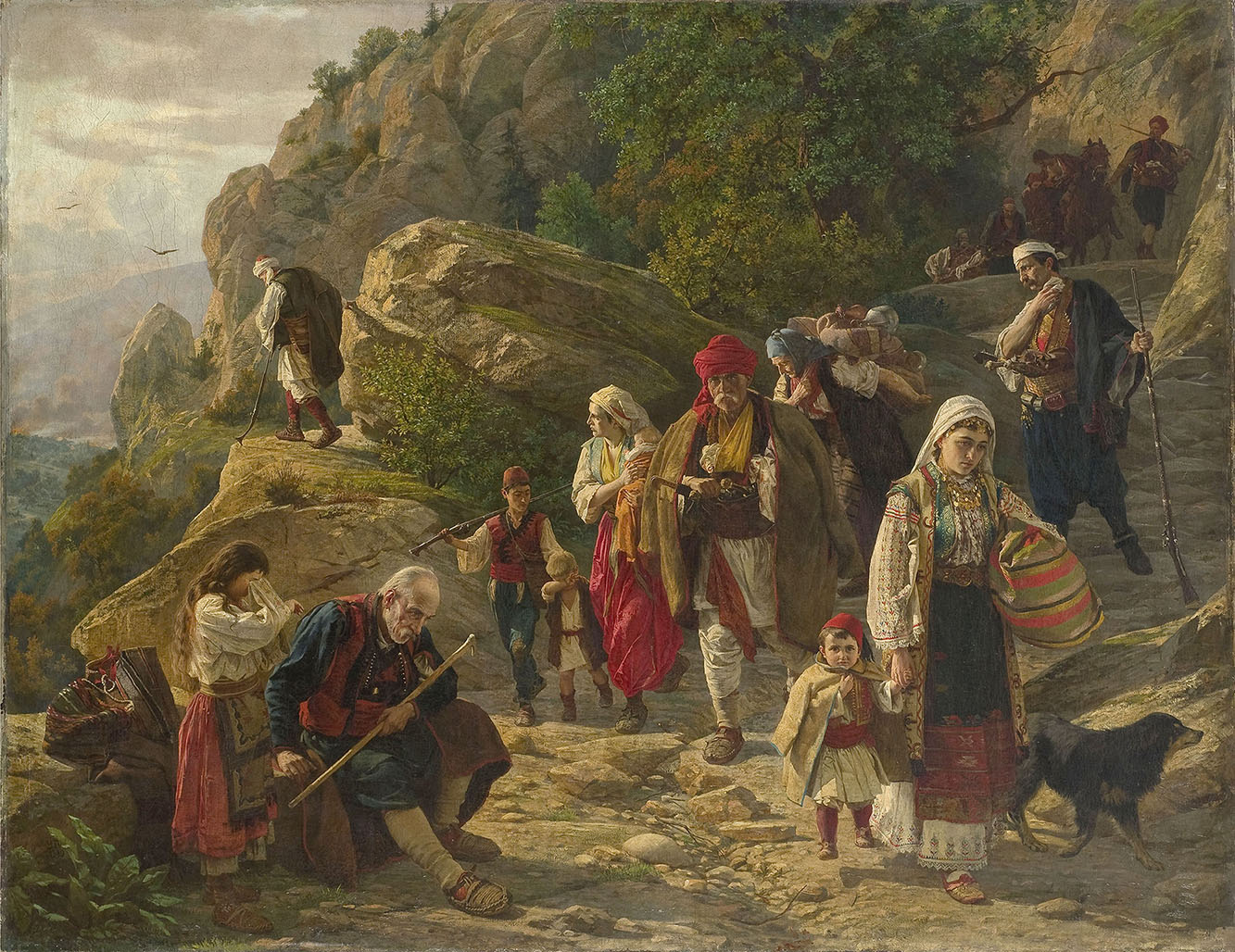
Refugees from Herzegovina, painting by Uroš Predić in 1889 made in the aftermath of the Herzegovina Uprising (1875–77)

The idea that a person who sought sanctuary in a holy place could not be harmed without inviting divine retribution was familiar to the ancient Greeks and ancient Egyptians. However, the right to seek asylum in a church or other holy place was first codified in law by King Æthelberht of Kent in about AD 600. Similar laws were implemented throughout Europe in the Middle Ages. The related concept of political exile also has a long history: Ovid was sent to Tomis; Voltaire was sent to England. By the 1648 Peace of Westphalia, nations recognized each other's sovereignty. However, it was not until the advent of romantic nationalism in late 18th-century Europe that nationalism gained sufficient prevalence for the phrase country of nationality to become practically meaningful, and for border crossing to require that people provide identification.

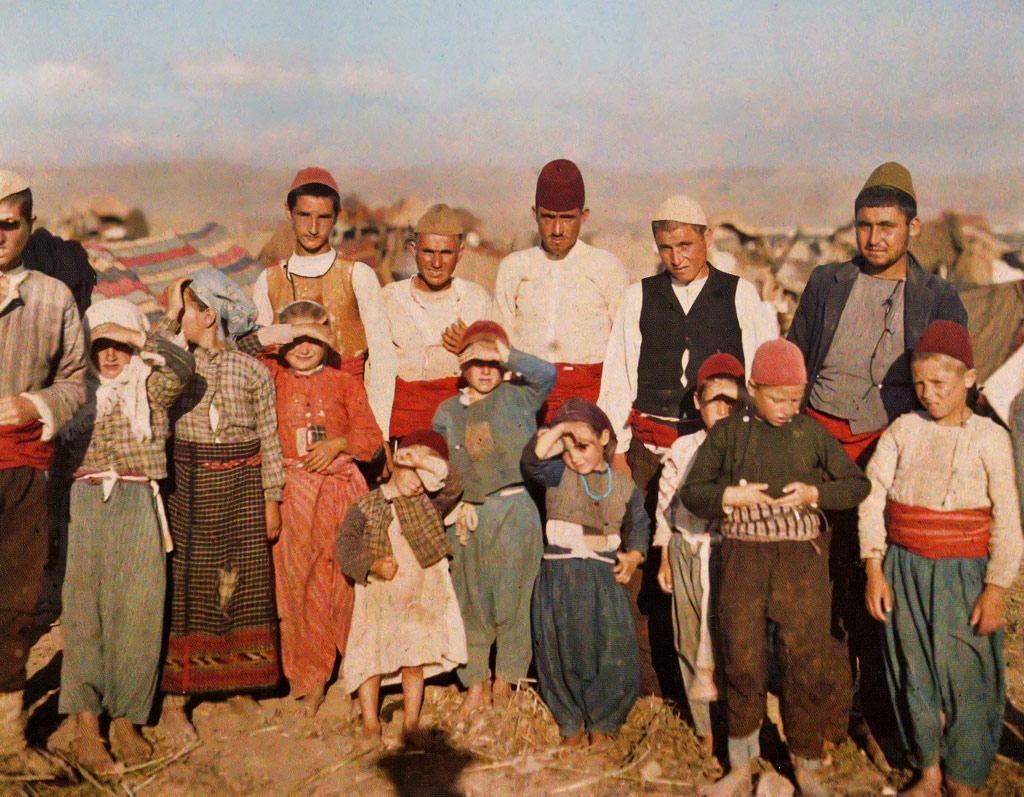
Turkish refugees from Edirne, 1913

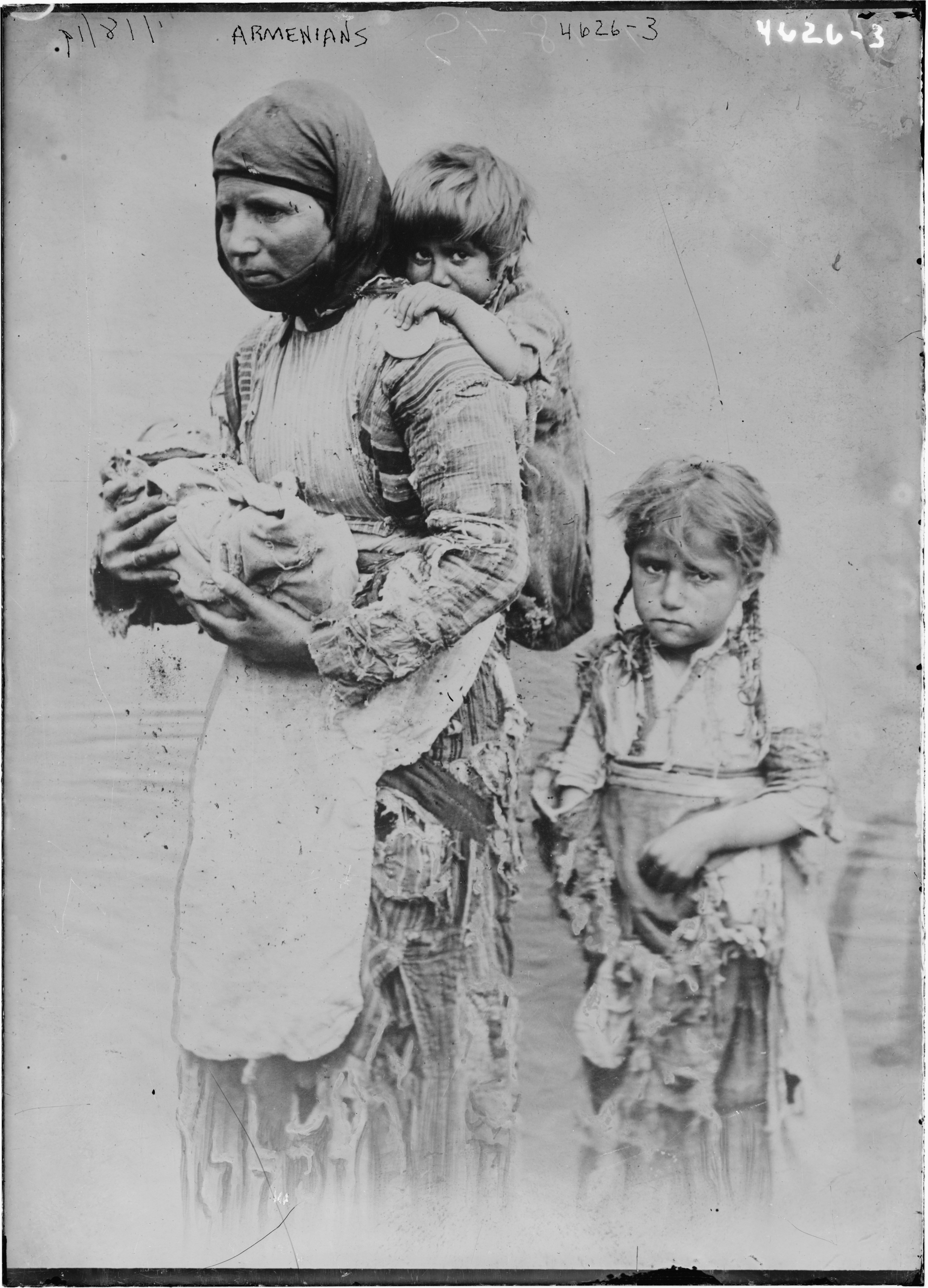
One million Armenians were forced to leave their homes in Anatolia in 1915 during the Armenian genocide, and many either died or were murdered on their way to Syria.

The term "refugee" sometimes applies to people who might fit the definition outlined by the 1951 Convention, were it applied retroactively. There are many candidates. For example, after the Edict of Fontainebleau in 1685 outlawed Protestantism in France, hundreds of thousands of Huguenots fled to England, the Netherlands, Switzerland, South Africa, Germany and Prussia. The repeated waves of pogroms that swept Eastern Europe in the 19th and early 20th centuries prompted mass Jewish emigration (more than 2 million Russian Jews emigrated in the period 1881–1920). Between the Crimean War of 1853–56 and World War I, at least 2.5 million Muslims arrived in the Ottoman Empire as refugees, primarily from Russia and the Balkans. The Balkan Wars of 1912–1913 caused 800,000 people to leave their homes. Various groups of people were officially designated refugees beginning in World War I. However, when the First World War began, there were no rules in international law specifically dealing with the situation of refugees.

=== League of Nations ===
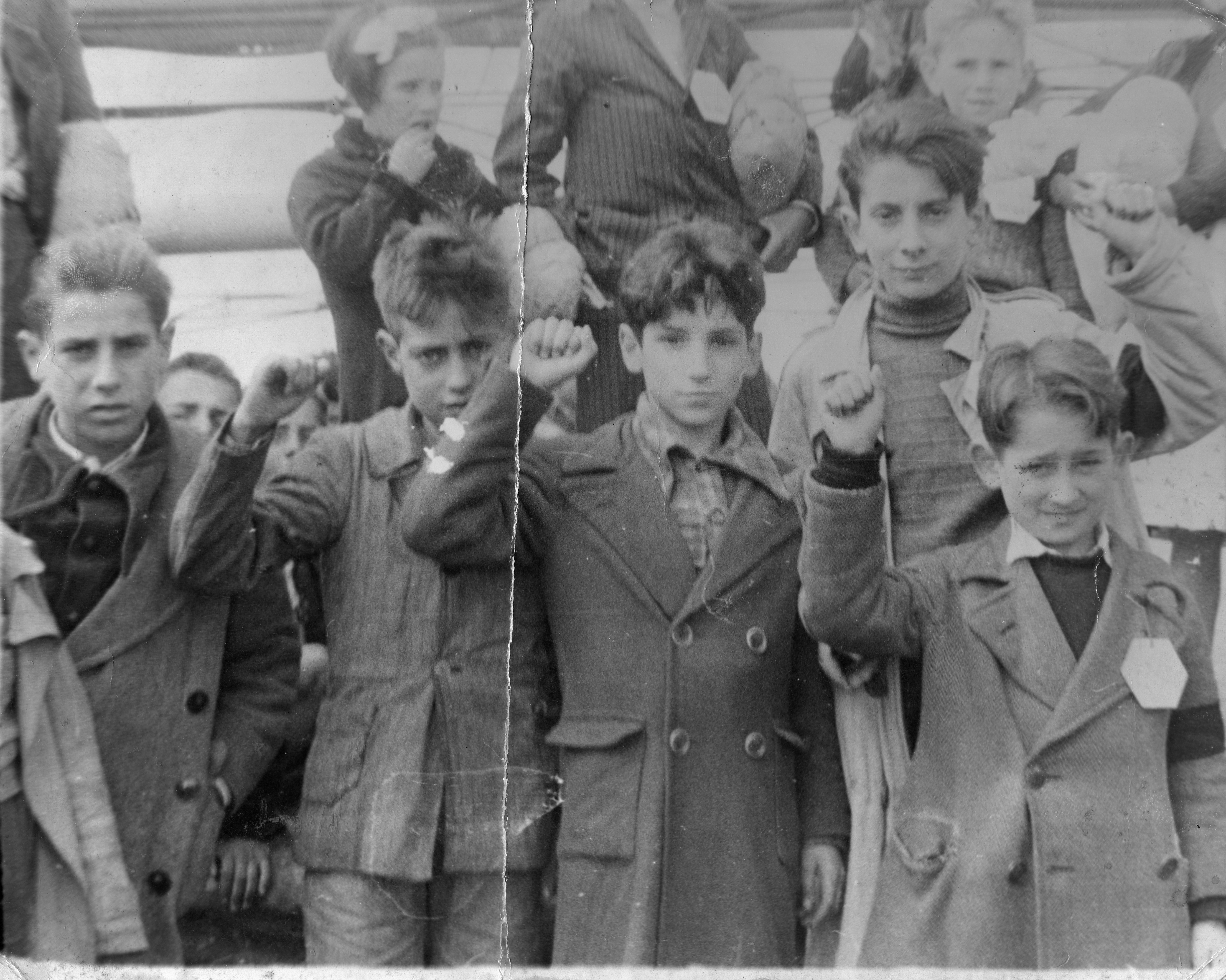
Children preparing for evacuation from Spain during the Spanish Civil War between 1936 and 1939

The first international co-ordination of refugee affairs came with the creation by the League of Nations in 1921 of the High Commission for Refugees and the appointment of Fridtjof Nansen as its head. Nansen and the commission were charged with assisting the approximately 1,500,000 people who fled the Russian Revolution of 1917 and the subsequent civil war (1917–1921), most of them aristocrats fleeing the Communist government. It is estimated that about 800,000 Russian refugees became stateless when Lenin revoked citizenship for all Russian expatriates in 1921.

In 1923, the mandate of the commission was expanded to include the more than one million Armenians who left Turkish Asia Minor in 1915 and 1923 due to a series of events now known as the Armenian genocide. Over the next several years, the mandate was expanded further to cover Assyrians and Turkish refugees. In all of these cases, a refugee was defined as a person in a group for which the League of Nations had approved a mandate, as opposed to a person to whom a general definition applied.

The 1923 population exchange between Greece and Turkey involved about two million people (around 1.5 million Anatolian Greeks and 500,000 Muslims in Greece) most of whom were forcibly repatriated and denaturalized from homelands of centuries or millennia (and guaranteed the nationality of the destination country) by a treaty promoted and overseen by the international community as part of the Treaty of Lausanne (1923). (Note: The "Convention Concerning the Exchange of Greek and Turkish Populations" was signed at Lausanne, Switzerland, on 30 January 1923, by the governments of Greece and Turkey.)

The U.S. Congress passed the Emergency Quota Act in 1921, followed by the Immigration Act of 1924. The Immigration Act of 1924 was aimed at further restricting the Southern and Eastern Europeans, especially Jews, Italians and Slavs, who had begun to enter the country in large numbers beginning in the 1890s. Most European refugees (principally Jews and Slavs) fleeing the Nazis and the Soviet Union were barred from going to the United States until after World War II, when Congress enacted the temporary Displaced Persons Act in 1948.

In 1930, the Nansen International Office for Refugees (Nansen Office) was established as a successor agency to the commission. Its most notable achievement was the Nansen passport, a refugee travel document, for which it was awarded the 1938 Nobel Peace Prize. The Nansen Office was plagued by problems of financing, an increase in refugee numbers, and a lack of co-operation from some member states, which led to mixed success overall.

However, the Nansen Office managed to lead fourteen nations to ratify the 1933 Refugee Convention, an early, and relatively modest, attempt at a human rights charter, and in general assisted around one million refugees worldwide.

=== Rise of Nazism, 1933 to 1944 ===
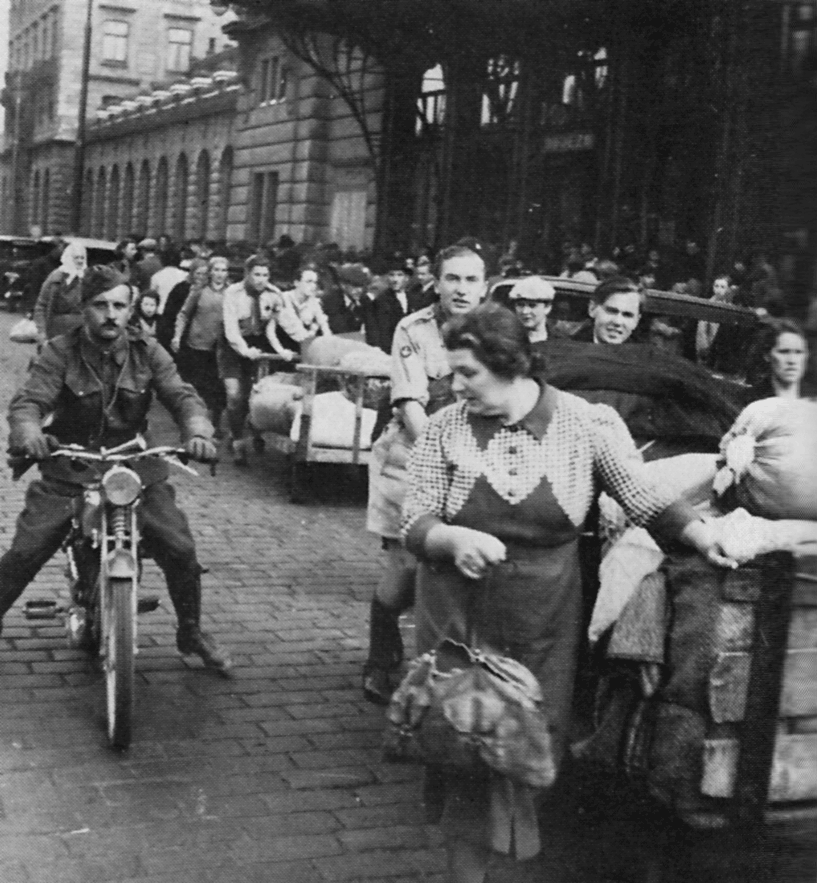
Czech refugees from the Sudetenland, October 1938

The rise of Nazism led to such a very large increase in the number of refugees from Germany that in 1933 the League created a high commission for refugees coming from Germany. Besides other measures by the Nazis which created fear and flight, Jews were stripped of German citizenship (Note: Bankier, David "Nuremberg Laws" pages 1076–1077 from The Encyclopedia of the Holocaust Volume 3 edited by Israel Gutman, New York: Macmillan, 1990 page 1076) by the Reich Citizenship Law of 1935. On 4 July 1936 an agreement was signed under League auspices that defined a refugee coming from Germany as "any person who was settled in that country, who does not possess any nationality other than German nationality, and in respect of whom it is established that in law or in fact he or she does not enjoy the protection of the Government of the Reich" (article 1). (Note: League of Nations Treaty Series vol. 171, p. 77)

The mandate of the High Commission was subsequently expanded to include persons from Austria and Sudetenland, which Germany annexed after 1 October 1938 in accordance with the Munich Agreement. According to the Institute for Refugee Assistance, the actual count of refugees from Czechoslovakia on 1 March 1939 stood at almost 150,000. Between 1933 and 1939, about 200,000 Jews fleeing Nazism were able to find refuge in France, while at least 55,000 Jews were able to find refuge in Palestine before the British authorities closed that destination in 1939.

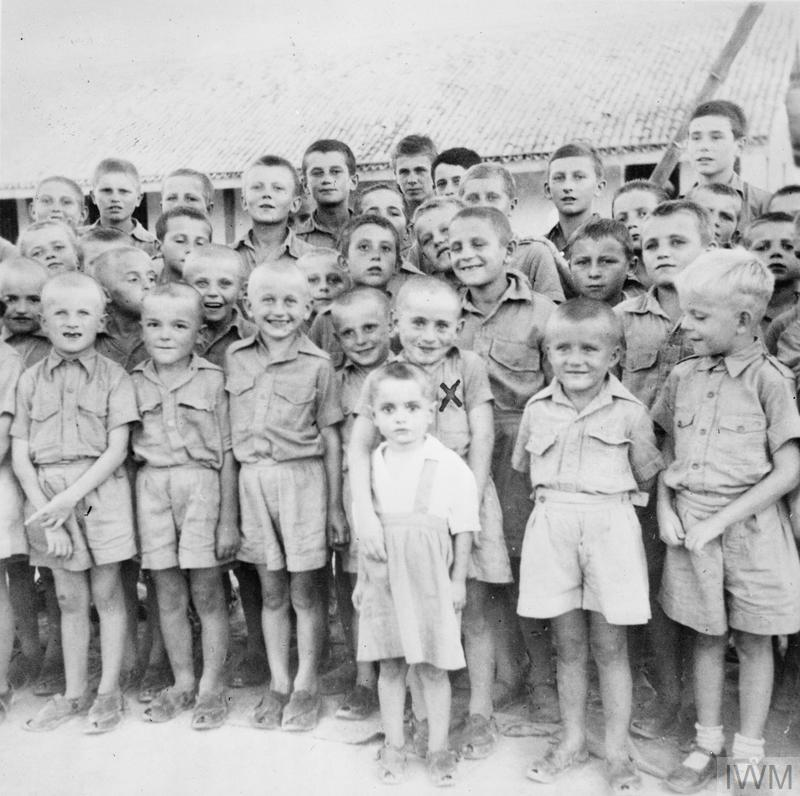
Polish child refugees and war orphans in Balachadi, British India 1941

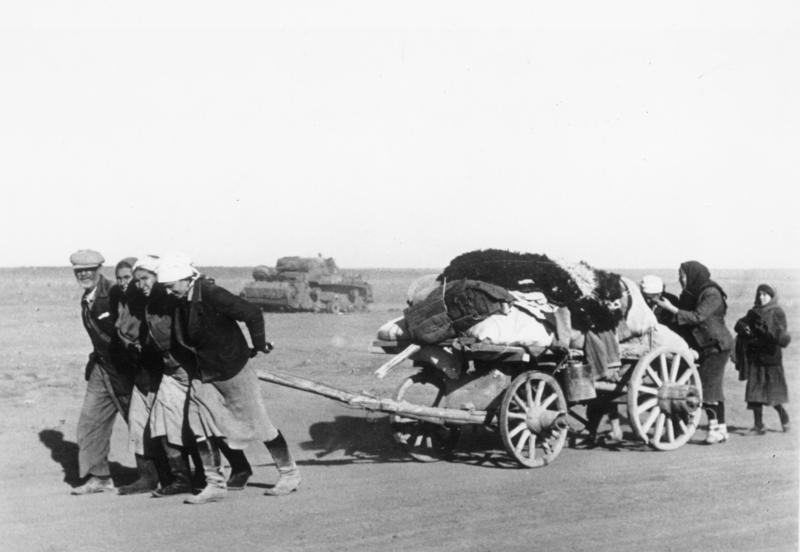
Russian refugees from the Battle of Stalingrad 1942

On 31 December 1938 both the Nansen Office and High Commission were dissolved and replaced by the Office of the High Commissioner for Refugees under the Protection of the League. This coincided with the flight of 500,000 Spanish Republicans, soldiers as well as civilians, to France after their defeat by the Nationalists in 1939 in the Spanish Civil War.

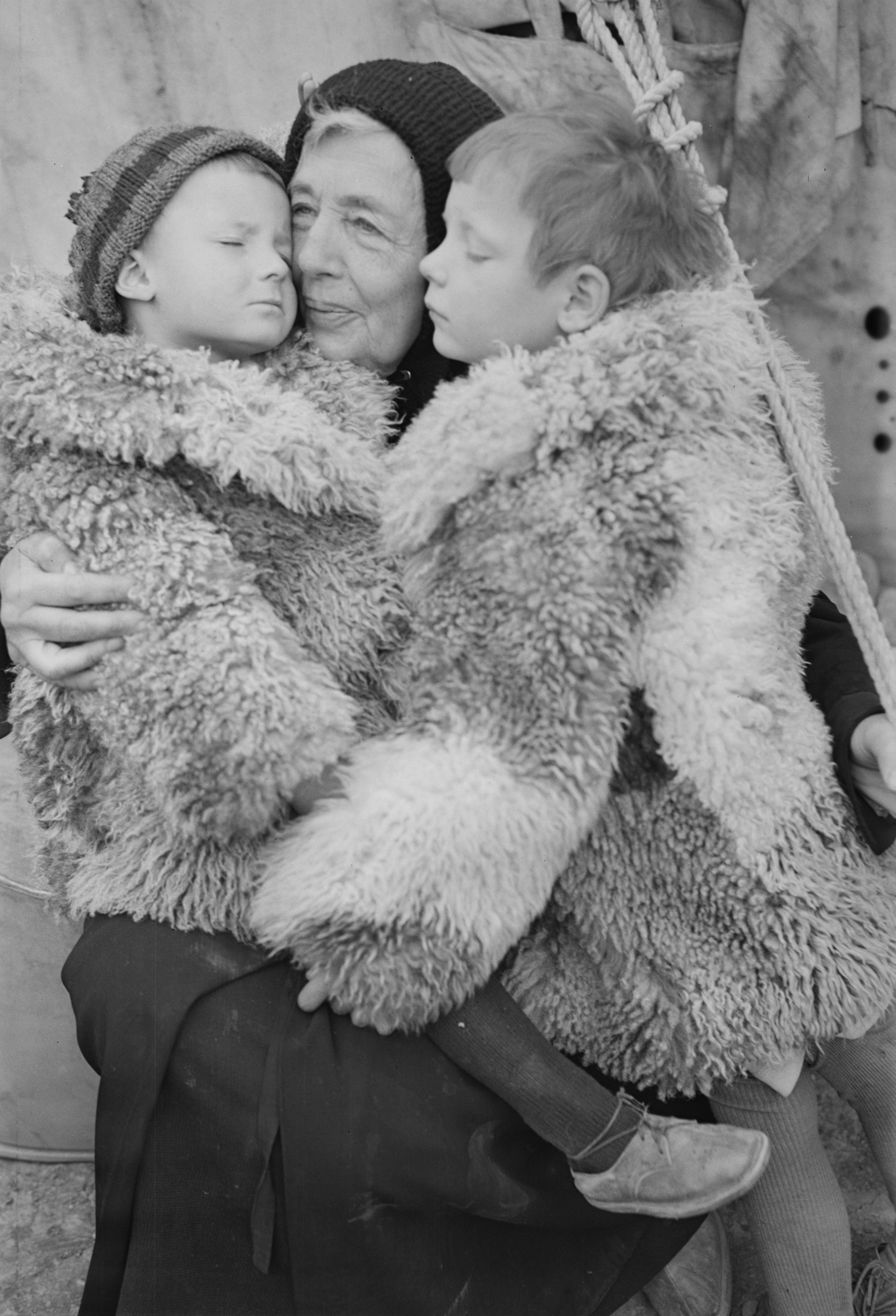
Polish refugees in Tehran, Imperial State of Iran, at an American Red Cross evacuation camp, 1943

The conflict and political instability during World War II led to massive numbers of refugees (see World War II evacuation and expulsion). In 1943, the Allies of World War II created the United Nations Relief and Rehabilitation Administration (UNRRA) to provide aid to areas liberated from Axis powers of World War II, including parts of Europe and China. By the end of the War, Europe had more than 40 million refugees. UNRRA was involved in returning over seven million refugees, then commonly referred to as displaced persons or DPs, to their country of origin and setting up displaced persons camps for one million refugees who refused to be repatriated. Even two years after the end of War, some 850,000 people still lived in DP camps across Western Europe. After the establishment of Israel in 1948, Israel accepted more than 650,000 Jewish refugees by 1950. By 1953, over 250,000 refugees were still in Europe, most of them old, infirm, crippled, or otherwise disabled.

=== Post-World War II population transfers ===
After the Soviet armed forces captured eastern Poland from the Germans in 1944, the Soviets unilaterally declared a new frontier between the Soviet Union and Poland approximately at the Curzon Line, despite the protestations from the Polish government-in-exile in London and the western Allies at the Teheran Conference and the Yalta Conference of February 1945. After the German surrender on 7 May 1945, the Allies occupied the remainder of Germany, and the Berlin declaration of 5 June 1945 confirmed the division of Allied-occupied Germany according to the Yalta Conference, which stipulated the continued existence of the German Reich as a whole, which would include its eastern territories as of 31 December 1937. This did not impact on Poland's eastern border, and Stalin refused to be removed from these eastern Polish territories.

In the last months of World War II, about five million German civilians from the German provinces of East Prussia, Pomerania and Silesia fled the advance of the Red Army from the east and became refugees in Mecklenburg, Brandenburg and Saxony. Since the spring of 1945, the Poles had been forcefully expelling the remaining German population in these provinces. When the Allies met in Potsdam on 17 July 1945 at the Potsdam Conference, a chaotic refugee situation faced the occupying powers. The Potsdam Agreement, Article VIII signed on 2 August 1945, defined the Polish western border as that of 1937, placing one fourth of Germany's territory under the Provisional Polish administration. Article XII ordered that the remaining German populations in Poland, Czechoslovakia and Hungary be transferred west in an "orderly and humane" manner.

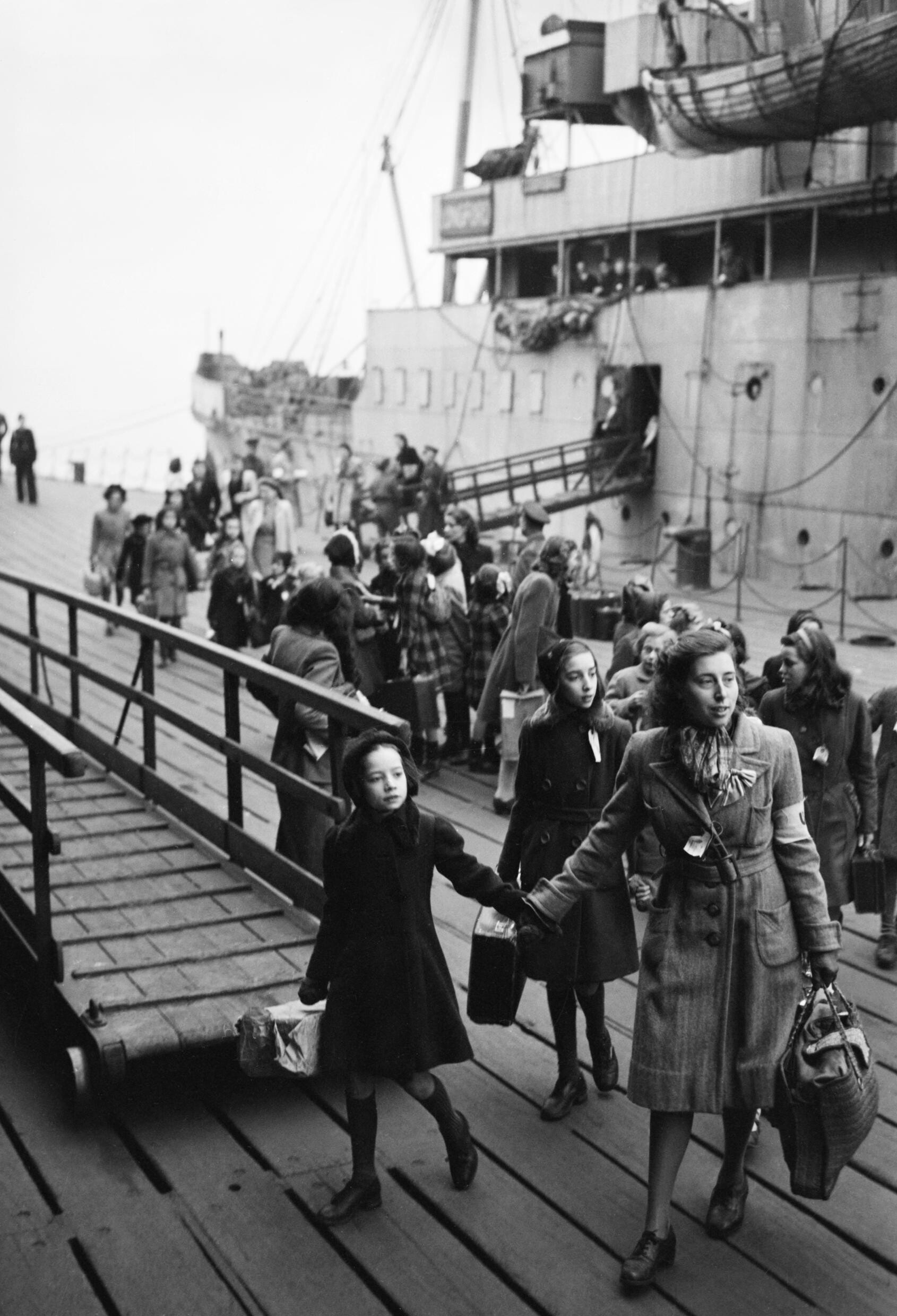
A Dutch school teacher leads a group of refugee children just disembarked from a ship at Port of Tilbury in Essex, England, United Kingdom during 1945.

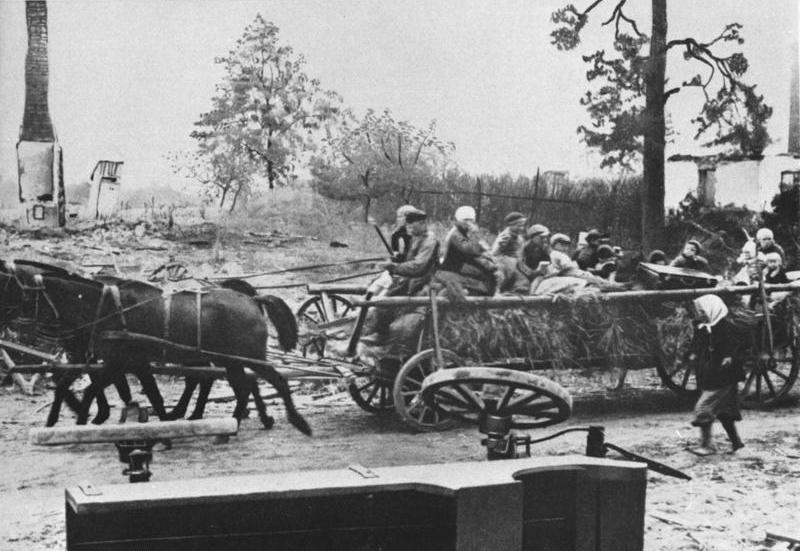
German refugees from East Prussia, 1945

Although not approved by Allies at Potsdam, hundreds of thousands of ethnic Germans living in Yugoslavia and Romania were deported to slave labour in the Soviet Union, to Allied-occupied Germany, and subsequently to the German Democratic Republic (East Germany), Austria and the Federal Republic of Germany (West Germany). This entailed the largest population transfer in history. In all 15 million Germans were affected, and more than two million perished during the expulsions of the German population. (See Flight and expulsion of Germans (1944–1950).) Between the end of War and the erection of the Berlin Wall in 1961, more than 563,700 refugees from East Germany traveled to West Germany for asylum from the Soviet occupation.

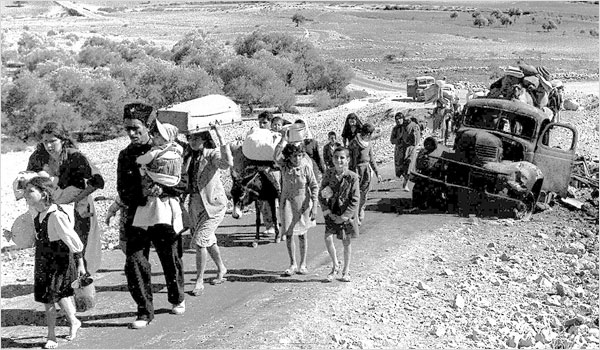
Palestinian refugees from Galilee 1948

At the end of World War II, there were more than 5 million "displaced persons" from the Soviet Union in Europe. About 3 million had been forced laborers (Ostarbeiters) in Germany and occupied territories, while 1.7 million Red Army soldiers survived, some by joining German military and police units. Following the Yalta Conference, the Allies initiated a program of mandatory repatriation for Soviet citizens who had resided in the USSR as of 1 September 1939. 4.2 million Ostarbeiters, Soviet prisoners of war, collaborators and refugees were transferred from both Soviet and Western occupation zones. While most returned voluntarily, Western forces coerced those resisting, mostly collaborators. The latter included the British handover of Cossacks in May and June 1945 and the late stage, localized Operation Keelhaul in 1946–1947, targeting remaining military collaborators. During the Cossack 1945 repatriations, the British handed over several thousand combatants and civilians who were not Soviet citizens under the Yalta parameters.

Declassified archives disprove Cold-war era claims of immediate, widespread persecution of the Soviet returnees. 58% of repatriates were cleared to return home, while officials drafted 33.5% into the Red Army or labor battalions and transferred 6.5% to NKVD filtration camps. Rank-and-file collaborators were processed administratively and sent into exile to special settlements; courts sentenced officers and high-ranking civilian collaborators to the Gulag. Many returnees faced life-long social stigma.

Poland and Soviet Ukraine conducted population exchanges following the imposition of a new Poland-Soviet border at the Curzon Line in 1944. About 2,100,000 Poles were expelled west of the new border (see Repatriation of Poles), while about 450,000 Ukrainians were expelled to the east of the new border. The population transfer to Soviet Ukraine occurred from September 1944 to May 1946 (see Repatriation of Ukrainians). A further 200,000 Ukrainians left southeast Poland more or less voluntarily between 1944 and 1945.

According to the report of the U.S. Committee for Refugees (1995), 10 to 15 percent of 7.5 million Azerbaijani population were refugees or displaced people. Most of them were 228,840 refugee people of Azerbaijan who fled from Armenia in 1988 as a result of deportation policy of Armenia against ethnic Azerbaijanis.

During the 1948 Palestine War, some 700,000 Palestinian Arabs or 85% of the Palestinian Arab population of territories that became Israel fled or were expelled from their homes by the Israelis.

The International Refugee Organization (IRO) was founded on 20 April 1946, and took over the functions of the United Nations Relief and Rehabilitation Administration, which was shut down in 1947. While the handover was originally planned to take place at the beginning of 1947, it did not occur until July 1947. The International Refugee Organization was a temporary organization of the United Nations (UN), which itself had been founded in 1945, with a mandate to largely finish the UNRRA's work of repatriating or resettling European refugees. It was dissolved in 1952 after resettling about one million refugees. The definition of a refugee at this time was an individual with either a Nansen passport or a "certificate of identity" issued by the International Refugee Organization.

The Constitution of the International Refugee Organization, adopted by the United Nations General Assembly on 15 December 1946, specified the agency's field of operations. Controversially, this defined "persons of German ethnic origin" who had been expelled, or were to be expelled from their countries of birth into the postwar Germany, as individuals who would "not be the concern of the Organization." This excluded from its purview a group that exceeded in number all the other European displaced persons put together. Also, because of disagreements between the Western allies and the Soviet Union, the IRO only worked in areas controlled by Western armies of occupation.

== Refugee studies ==
With the occurrence of major instances of diaspora and forced migration, the study of their causes and implications has emerged as a legitimate interdisciplinary area of research, and began to rise by mid to late 20th century, after World War II. Although significant contributions had been made before, the latter half of the 20th century saw the establishment of institutions dedicated to the study of refugees, such as the Association for the Study of the World Refugee Problem, which was closely followed by the founding of the United Nations High Commissioner for Refugees. In particular, the 1981 volume of the International Migration Review defined refugee studies as "a comprehensive, historical, interdisciplinary and comparative perspective which focuses on the consistencies and patterns in the refugee experience." Following its publishing, the field saw a rapid increase in academic interest and scholarly inquiry, which has continued to the present. Most notably in 1988, the Journal of Refugee Studies was established as the field's first major interdisciplinary journal.

The emergence of refugee studies as a distinct field of study has been criticized by scholars due to terminological difficulty. Since no universally accepted definition for the term "refugee" exists, the academic respectability of the policy-based definition, as outlined in the 1951 Refugee Convention, is disputed. Additionally, academics have critiqued the lack of a theoretical basis of refugee studies and dominance of policy-oriented research. In response, scholars have attempted to steer the field toward establishing a theoretical groundwork of refugee studies through "situating studies of particular refugee (and other forced migrant) groups in the theories of cognate areas (and major disciplines), [providing] an opportunity to use the particular circumstances of refugee situations to illuminate these more general theories and thus participate in the development of social science, rather than leading refugee studies into an intellectual cul-de-sac." Thus, the term refugee in the context of refugee studies can be referred to as "legal or descriptive rubric", encompassing socioeconomic backgrounds, personal histories, psychological analyses, and spiritualities.

== UN Refugee Agencies ==
=== UNHCR ===
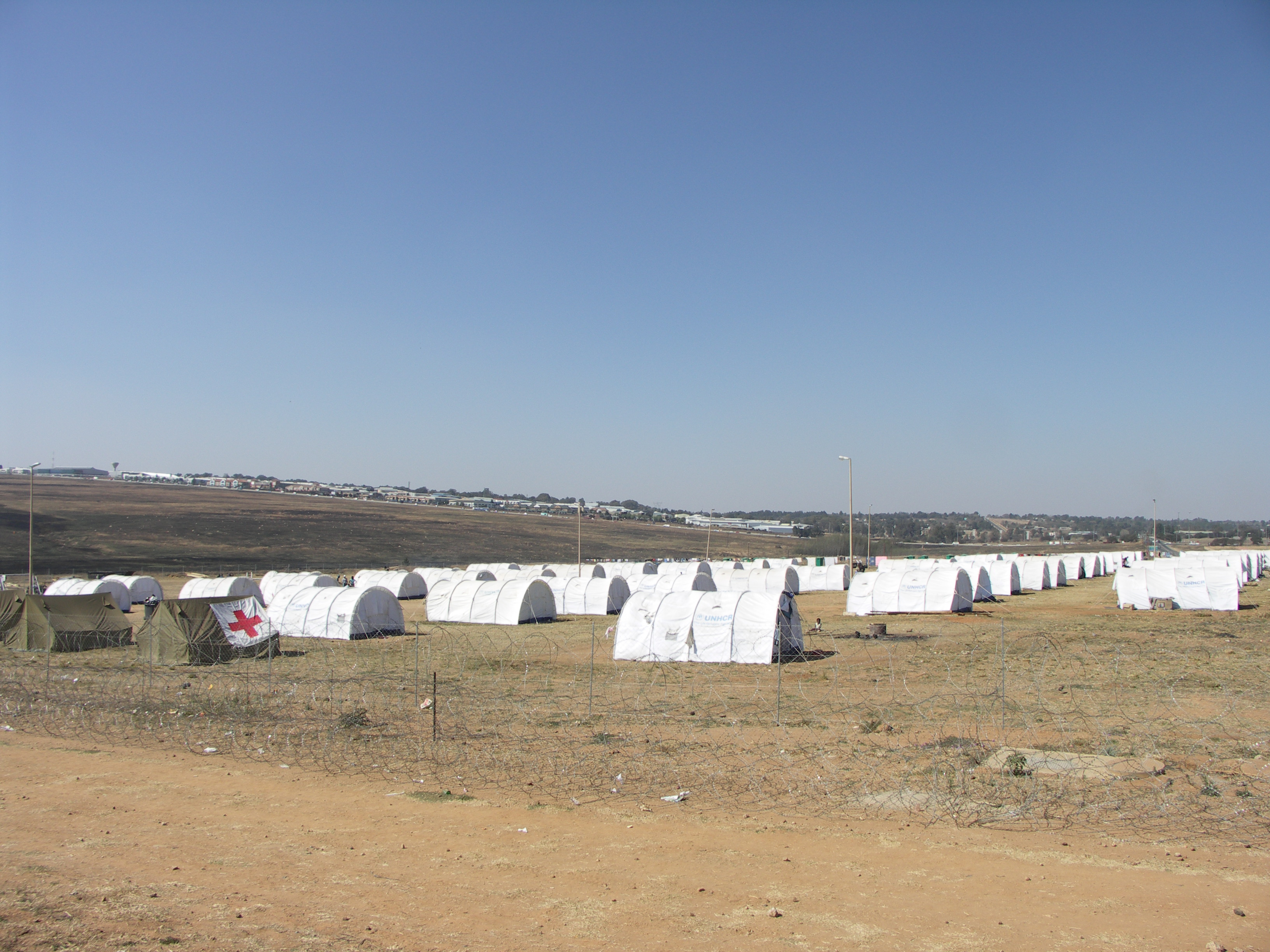
UNHCR tents at a refugee camp following episodes of xenophobic violence and rioting in South Africa, 2008

Headquartered in Geneva, Switzerland, the Office of the United Nations High Commissioner for Refugees (UNHCR) was established on 14 December 1950. It protects and supports refugees at the request of a government or the United Nations and assists in providing durable solutions, such as return or resettlement. All refugees in the world are under UNHCR mandate except Palestinian refugees, who fled the current state of Israel between 1947 and 1949, as a result of the 1948 Arab–Israeli War. These refugees are assisted by the United Nations Relief and Works Agency (UNRWA). UNHCR also provides protection and assistance to other categories of displaced persons: asylum seekers, refugees who returned home voluntarily but still need help rebuilding their lives, local civilian communities directly affected by large refugee movements, stateless people and so-called internally displaced people (IDPs), as well as people in refugee-like and IDP-like situations. The agency is mandated to lead and co-ordinate international action to protect refugees and to resolve refugee problems worldwide. Its primary purpose is to safeguard the rights and well-being of refugees. It strives to ensure that everyone can exercise the right to seek asylum and find safe refuge in another state or territory and to offer "durable solutions" to refugees and refugee hosting countries.

=== UNRWA ===
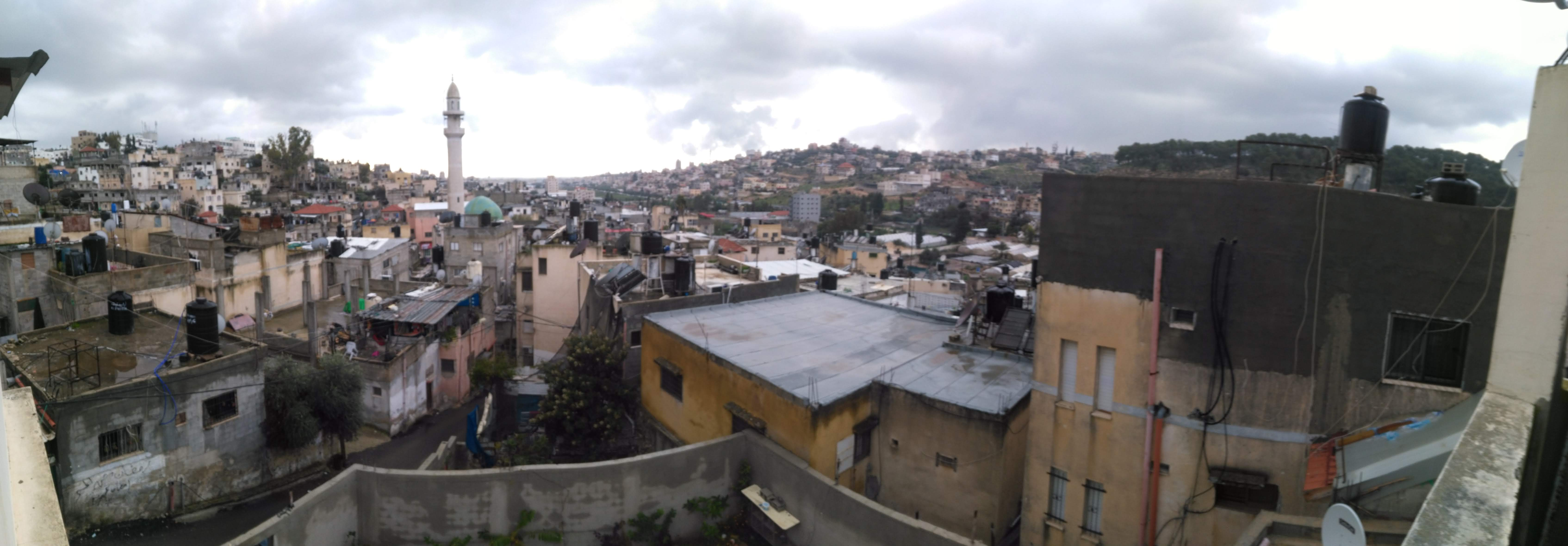
Eastern part of UNRWA-run Nur Shams Palestine refugee camp (2019)

Unlike other refugee groups, the UN created a specific entity called the UN Relief and Works Agency for Palestine Refugees (UNRWA) in the aftermath of the war in 1948, which led to a serious refugee crisis in the Arab region, and was responsible for the displacement of 700,000 Palestinian refugees. This number has gone up to at least 5 million refugees in the last 70 years.

The United Nations defines Palestinian refugees as "persons whose normal place of residence was Palestine during the period 1 June 1946 to 15 May 1948, and who lost both home and means of livelihood as a result of the 1948 conflict."

The population of Palestinian refugees continues to grow due to multiple UNRWA reclassifications of what is considered to be a refugee. "In 1965, UNRWA changed the eligibility requirements to be a Palestinian refugee to include third-generation descendants, and in 1982, it extended it again, to include all descendants of Palestine refugee males, including legally adopted children, regardless of whether they had been granted citizenship elsewhere. This classification process is inconsistent with how all other refugees in the world are classified, including the definition used by the United Nations High Commissioner for Refugees (UNHCR) and the laws concerning refugees in the United States."

Another refugee wave started in 1967 after the Six-day-War, where mostly Palestinians living in Gaza and the West Bank were victims of displacement. According to the United Nations, Palestinian refugees struggle with access to health care, food, clean water, sanitation, environmental health and infrastructure, education, and technology. According to the report, food, shelter, and environmental health are a human's basic needs. United Nations agency UNRWA (The United Nations Relief and Works Agency for Palestine Refugees in the Near East) focuses on addressing these issues to relieve Palestinians from any harm. UNRWA was established as a temporary agency that would carry out a humanitarian response mandate for Palestinian refugees in Gaza, the West Bank, Syria, Jordan and Lebanon.

The responsibilities for the assistance for protection for Palestinian refugees and human development were originally left to the United Nations Conciliation Commission for Palestine (UNCCP). This agency failed to function, which led the agency to stop working. UNRWA took over these responsibilities and expanded their mandate from just humanitarian emergency relief to including human development and protection of the Palestinian society. Communication with host countries where UNRWA is operating (Syria, Jordan and Lebanon) is very important as the agency's mandate changes per region. UNRWA's Medium Term Strategy is a report that lists all the issues that the Palestinians are facing and UNRWA's plan to mitigate the severeness of the issues. The report shows that UNRWA focuses mostly on food assistance, health care, education and shelter for Palestinian refugees. UNRWA has succeeded in placing over 700 schools with over 500,000 students, 140 health centers, 113 women community centers, and has awarded over 475,000 loans. UNRWA's funding relies mostly on voluntary donations. Fluctuations in these donations result in constraints in carrying out the mandate.

=== Acute and temporary protection ===
==== Refugee camp ====
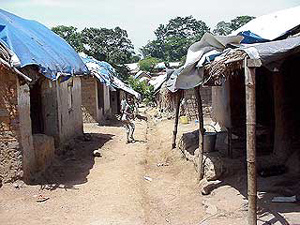
A camp in Guinea for refugees from Sierra Leone

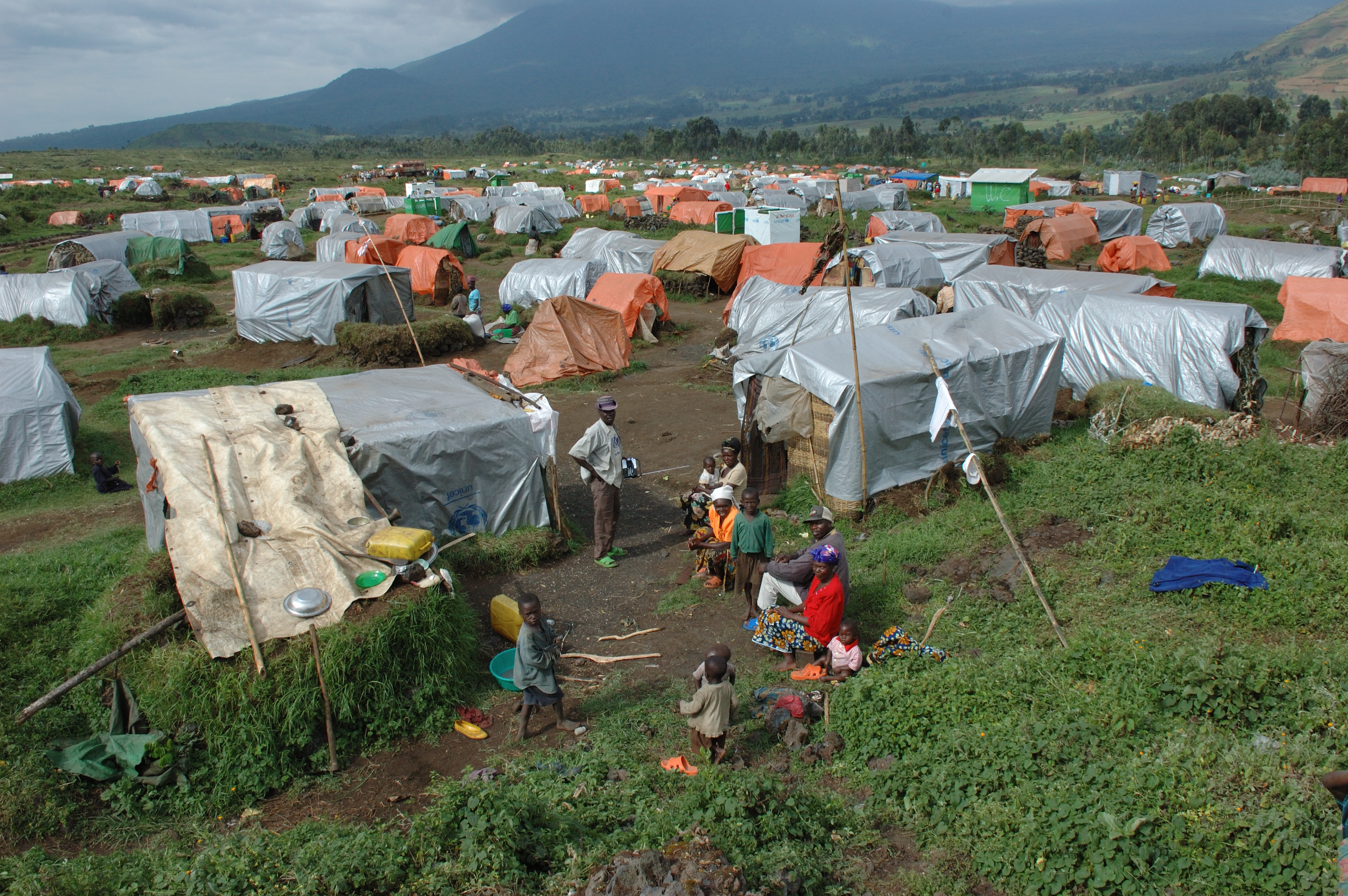
Refugee camp in the Congo

A refugee camp is a place built by governments or NGOs (such as the Red Cross) to receive refugees, internally displaced persons or sometimes also other migrants. It is usually designed to offer acute and temporary accommodation and services and any more permanent facilities and structures often banned. People may stay in these camps for many years, receiving emergency food, education and medical aid until it is safe enough to return to their country of origin. There, refugees are at risk of disease, child soldier and terrorist recruitment, and physical and sexual violence. There are estimated to be 700 refugee camp locations worldwide.

==== Urban refugee ====
Not all refugees who are supported by the UNHCR live in refugee camps. A significant number, more than half, live in urban settings, such as the ~60,000 Iraqi refugees in Damascus (Syria), and the ~30,000 Sudanese refugees in Cairo (Egypt).

=== Durable solutions ===
The residency status in the host country whilst under temporary UNHCR protection is very uncertain as refugees are only granted temporary visas that have to be regularly renewed. Rather than only safeguarding the rights and basic well-being of refugees in the camps or in urban settings on a temporary basis the UNHCR's ultimate goal is to find one of the three durable solutions for refugees: integration, repatriation, resettlement.

==== Integration and naturalisation ====
Local integration is aiming at providing the refugee with the permanent right to stay in the country of asylum, including, in some situations, as a naturalized citizen. It follows the formal granting of refugee status by the country of asylum. It is difficult to quantify the number of refugees who settled and integrated in their first country of asylum and only the number of naturalisations can give an indication. In 2014 Tanzania granted citizenship to 162,000 refugees from Burundi and in 1982 to 32,000 Rwandan refugees. Mexico naturalised 6,200 Guatemalan refugees in 2001.

==== Voluntary return ====
Voluntary return of refugees into their country of origin, in safety and dignity, is based on their free will and their informed decision. In the last couple of years parts of or even whole refugee populations were able to return to their home countries: e.g. 120,000 Congolese refugees returned from the Republic of Congo to the DRC, 30,000 Angolans returned home from the DRC and Botswana, Ivorian refugees returned from Liberia, Afghans from Pakistan, and Iraqis from Syria. In 2013, the governments of Kenya and Somalia also signed a tripartite agreement facilitating the repatriation of refugees from Somalia. The UNHCR and the IOM offer assistance to refugees who want to return voluntarily to their home countries. Many developed countries also have Assisted Voluntary Return (AVR) programmes for asylum seekers who want to go back or were refused asylum.

==== Third country resettlement ====
Third country resettlement involves the assisted transfer of refugees from the country in which they have sought asylum to a safe third country that has agreed to admit them as refugees. This can be for permanent settlement or limited to a certain number of years. It is the third durable solution and it can only be considered once the two other solutions have proved impossible. The UNHCR has traditionally seen resettlement as the least preferable of the "durable solutions" to refugee situations. However, in April 2000 the then UN High Commissioner for Refugees, Sadako Ogata, stated "Resettlement can no longer be seen as the least-preferred durable solution; in many cases it is the only solution for refugees."

=== Internally displaced person ===
UNHCR's mandate has gradually been expanded to include protecting and providing humanitarian assistance to internally displaced persons (IDPs) and people in IDP-like situations. These are civilians who have been forced to flee their homes, but who have not reached a neighboring country. IDPs do not fit the legal definition of a refugee under the 1951 Refugee Convention, 1967 Protocol and the 1969 Organization for African Unity Convention, because they have not left their country. As the nature of war has changed in the last few decades, with more and more internal conflicts replacing interstate wars, the number of IDPs has increased significantly.

Comparison between the number of refugees and IDPs who are supported by the UNHCR between 1998 and 2014, and 2022.
End-year	1996	2000	2002	2004	2006	2008	2010	2012	2014	2022
Refugees	11,480,900	12,129,600	10,594,100	9,574,800	9,877,700	10,489,800	10,549,700	10,498,000	14,385,300	29,429,078
IDPs	5,063,900	5,998,500	4,646,600	5,426,500	12,794,300	14,442,200	14,697,900	17,670,400	32,274,600	57,321,197

== Refugee status ==
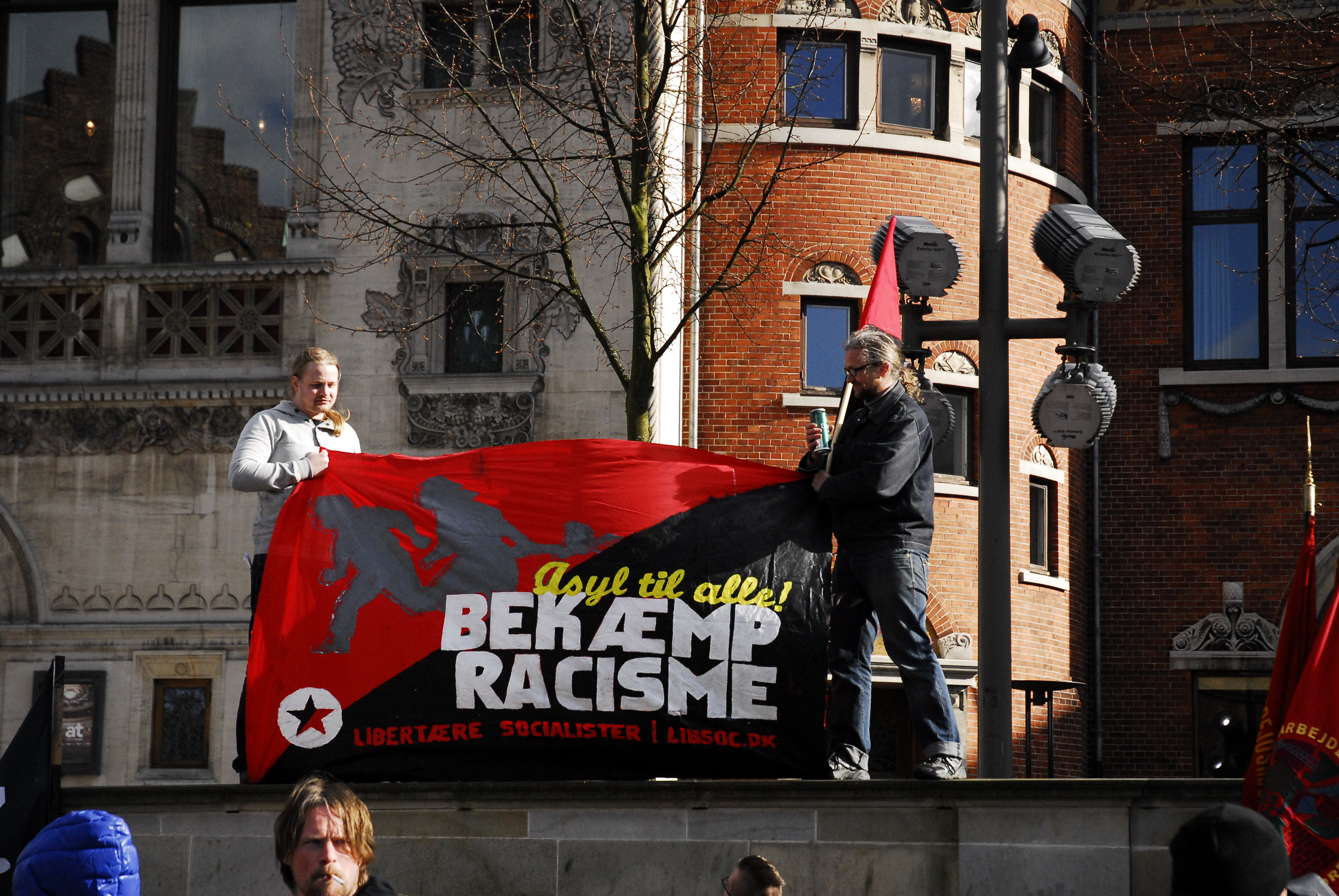
Libertarian socialist protest in support of refugees, Denmark

In the United States, refugee is defined under the Immigration and Nationality Act (INA). In other countries, it is often used in different contexts: in everyday usage it refers to a forcibly displaced person who has fled his or her country of origin; in a more specific context it refers to such a person who was, on top of that, granted refugee status in the country the person fled to. Even more exclusive is the Convention refugee status which is given only to persons who fall within the refugee definition of the 1951 Convention and the 1967 Protocol.

To receive refugee status, a person must have applied for asylum, making them—while waiting for a decision—an asylum seeker. However, a displaced person otherwise legally entitled to refugee status may never apply for asylum, or may not be allowed to apply in the country they fled to and thus may not have official asylum seeker status.

Once a displaced person is granted refugee status they enjoy certain rights as agreed in the 1951 Refugee convention. Not all countries have signed and ratified this convention and some countries do not have a legal procedure for dealing with asylum seekers.

=== Seeking asylum ===
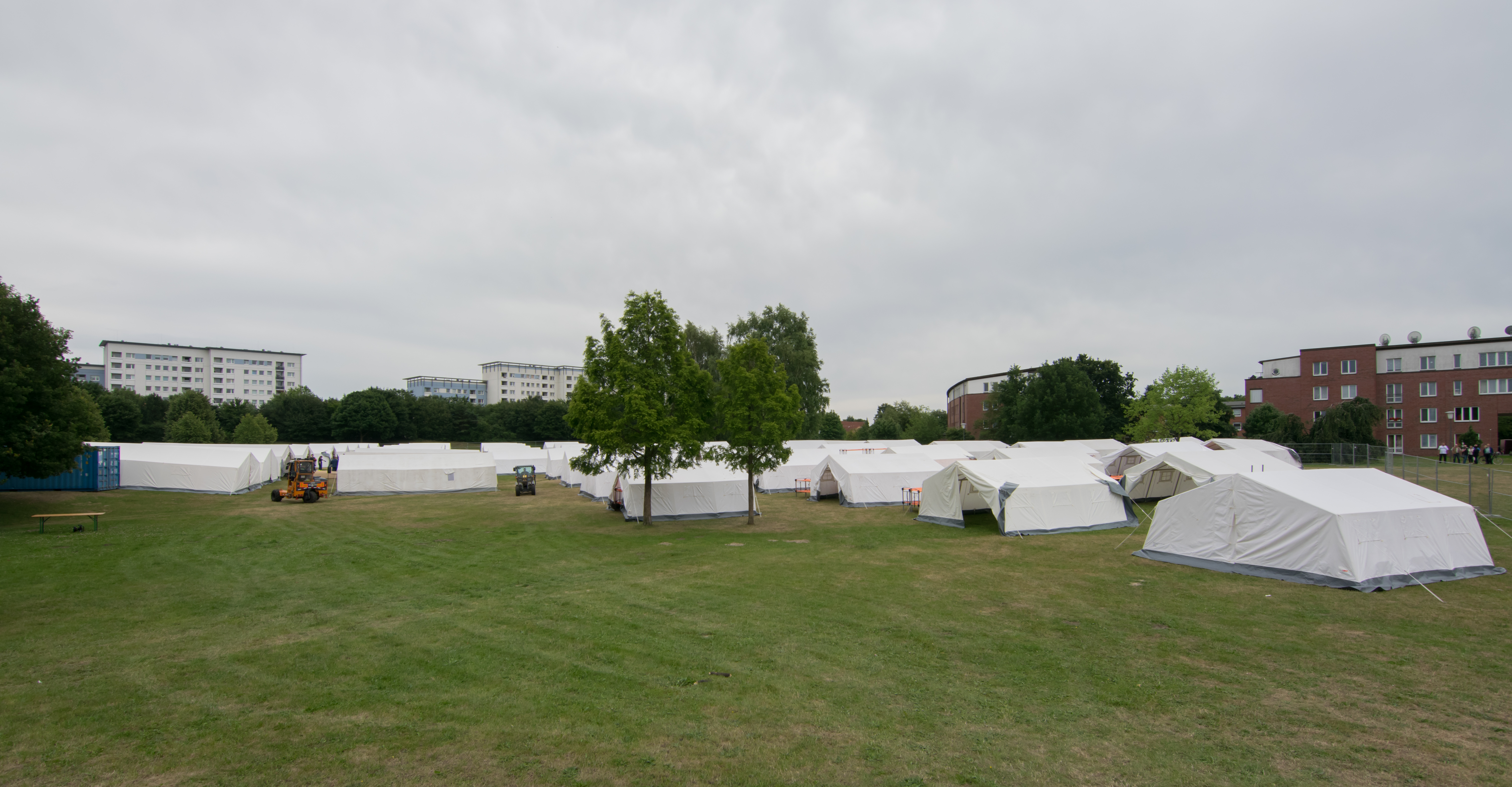
Erstaufnahmelager Jenfelder Moorpark

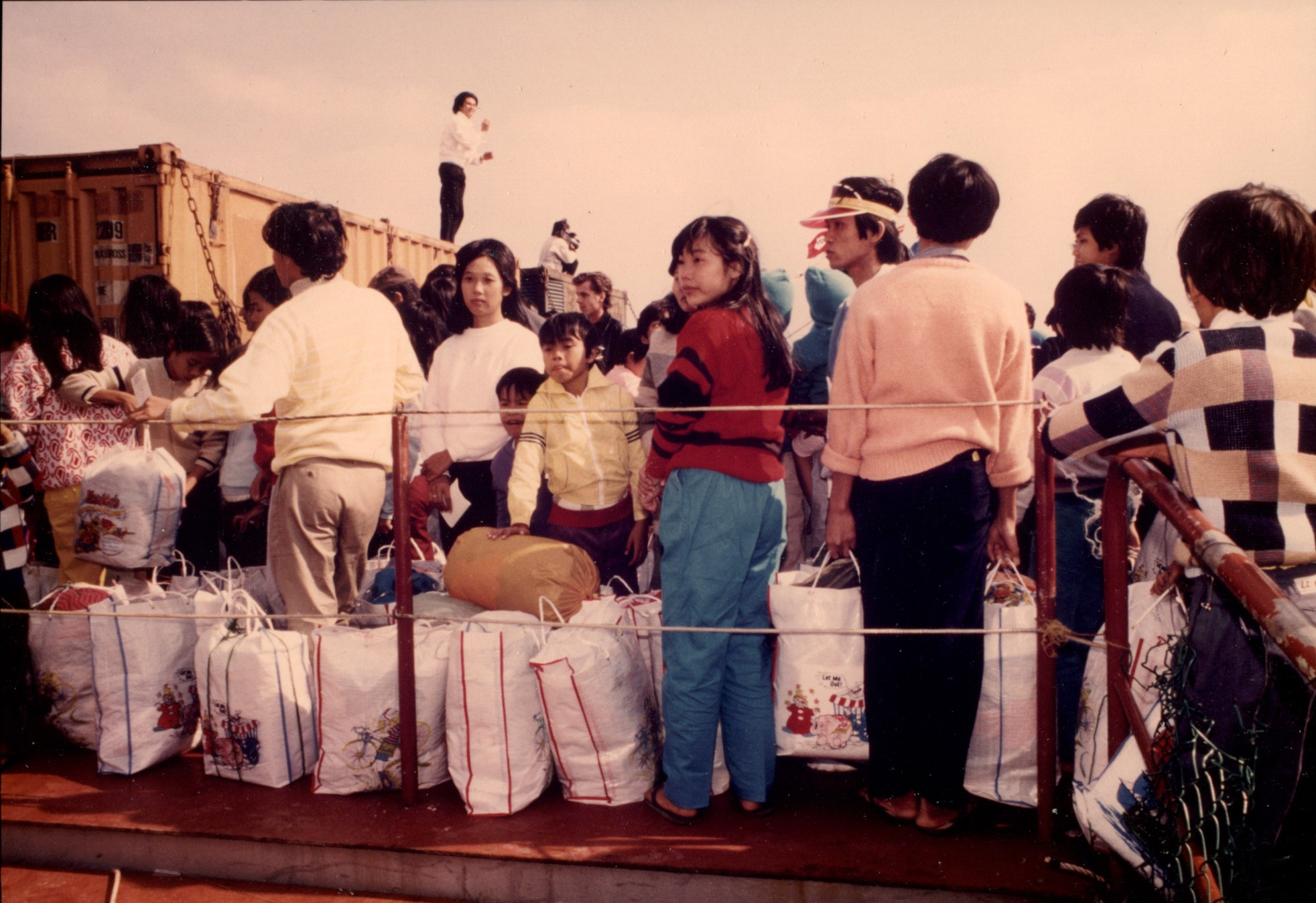
Vietnamese refugees land at Hamburg on the Cap Anamur II in 1986.

An asylum seeker is a displaced person or immigrant who has formally sought the protection of the state they fled to as well as the right to remain in this country and who is waiting for a decision on this formal application. An asylum seeker may have applied for Convention refugee status or for complementary forms of protection. Asylum is thus a category that includes different forms of protection. Which form of protection is offered depends on the legal definition that best describes the asylum seeker's reasons to flee. Once the decision was made the asylum seeker receives either Convention refugee status or a complementary form of protection, and can stay in the country—or is refused asylum, and then often has to leave. Only after the state, territory or the UNHCR—wherever the application was made—recognises the protection needs does the asylum seeker officially receive refugee status. This carries certain rights and obligations, according to the legislation of the receiving country.

Quota refugees do not need to apply for asylum on arrival in the third countries as they already went through the UNHCR refugee status determination process whilst being in the first country of asylum and this is usually accepted by the third countries.

=== Refugee status determination ===
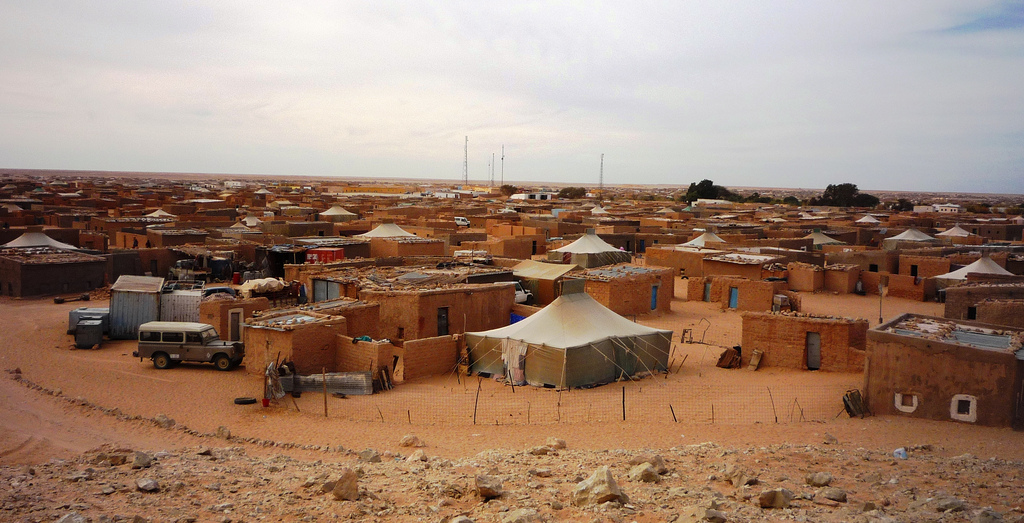
For over 30 years, several tens of thousands of Sahrawi refugees have been living in the region of Tindouf, Algeria, in the heart of the desert.

To receive refugee status, a displaced person must go through a Refugee Status Determination (RSD) process, which is conducted by the government of the country of asylum or the UNHCR, and is based on international, regional or national law. RSD can be done on a case-by-case basis as well as for whole groups of people. Which of the two processes is used often depends on the size of the influx of displaced persons.

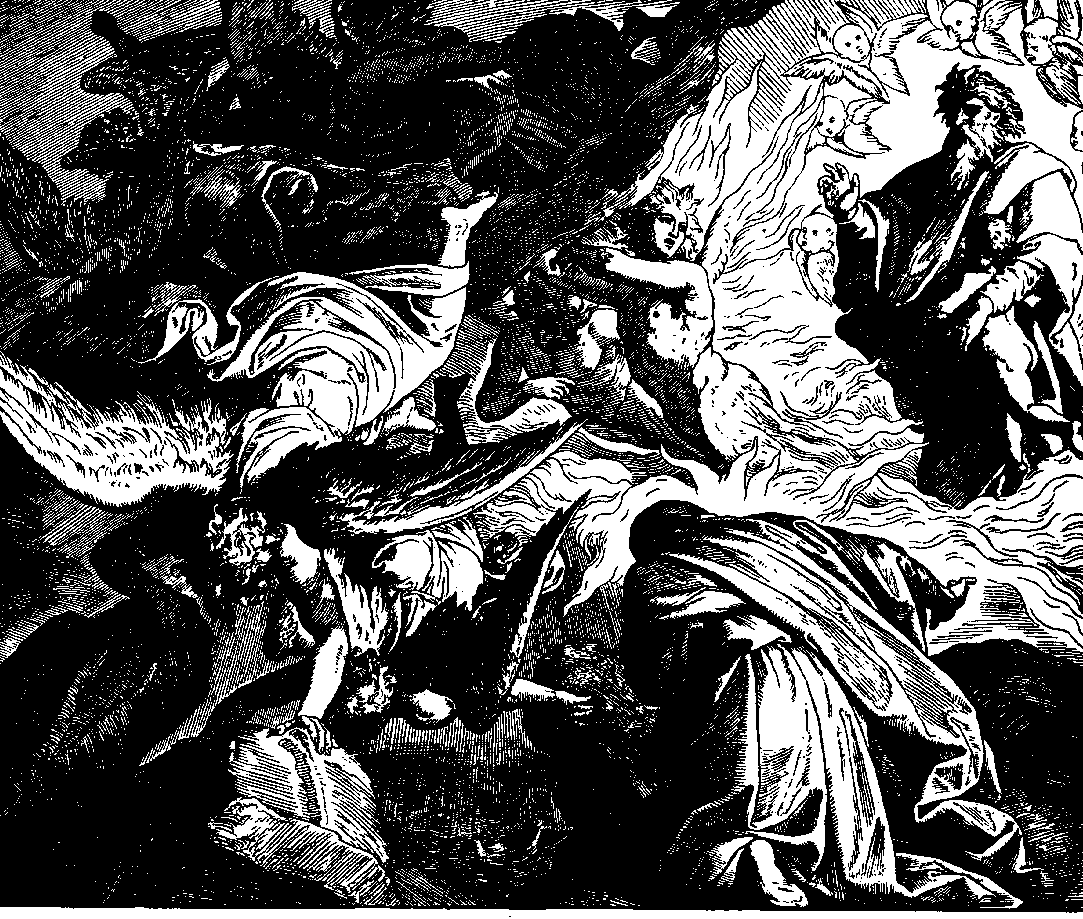
After challenging Queen Jezebel, Elijah takes refuge in a cave until the voice of God calls him in this 1860 woodcut by Julius Schnorr von Karolsfeld.

There is no specific method mandated for RSD (apart from the commitment to the 1951 Refugee Convention) and it is subject to the overall efficacy of the country's internal administrative and judicial system as well as the characteristics of the refugee flow to which the country responds. This lack of a procedural direction could create a situation where political and strategic interests override humanitarian considerations in the RSD process. There are also no fixed interpretations of the elements in the 1951 Refugee Convention and countries may interpret them differently (see also refugee roulette).

However, in 2013, the UNHCR conducted them in more than 50 countries and co-conducted them parallel to or jointly with governments in another 20 countries, which made it the second largest RSD body in the world The UNHCR follows a set of guidelines described in the Handbook and Guidelines on Procedures and Criteria for Determining Refugee Status to determine which individuals are eligible for refugee status.

== Refugee rights ==
Refugee rights encompass both customary law, peremptory norms, and international legal instruments. If the entity granting refugee status is a state that has signed the 1951 Refugee Convention then the refugee has the right to employment. Further rights include the following rights and obligations for refugees:

=== Right of return ===
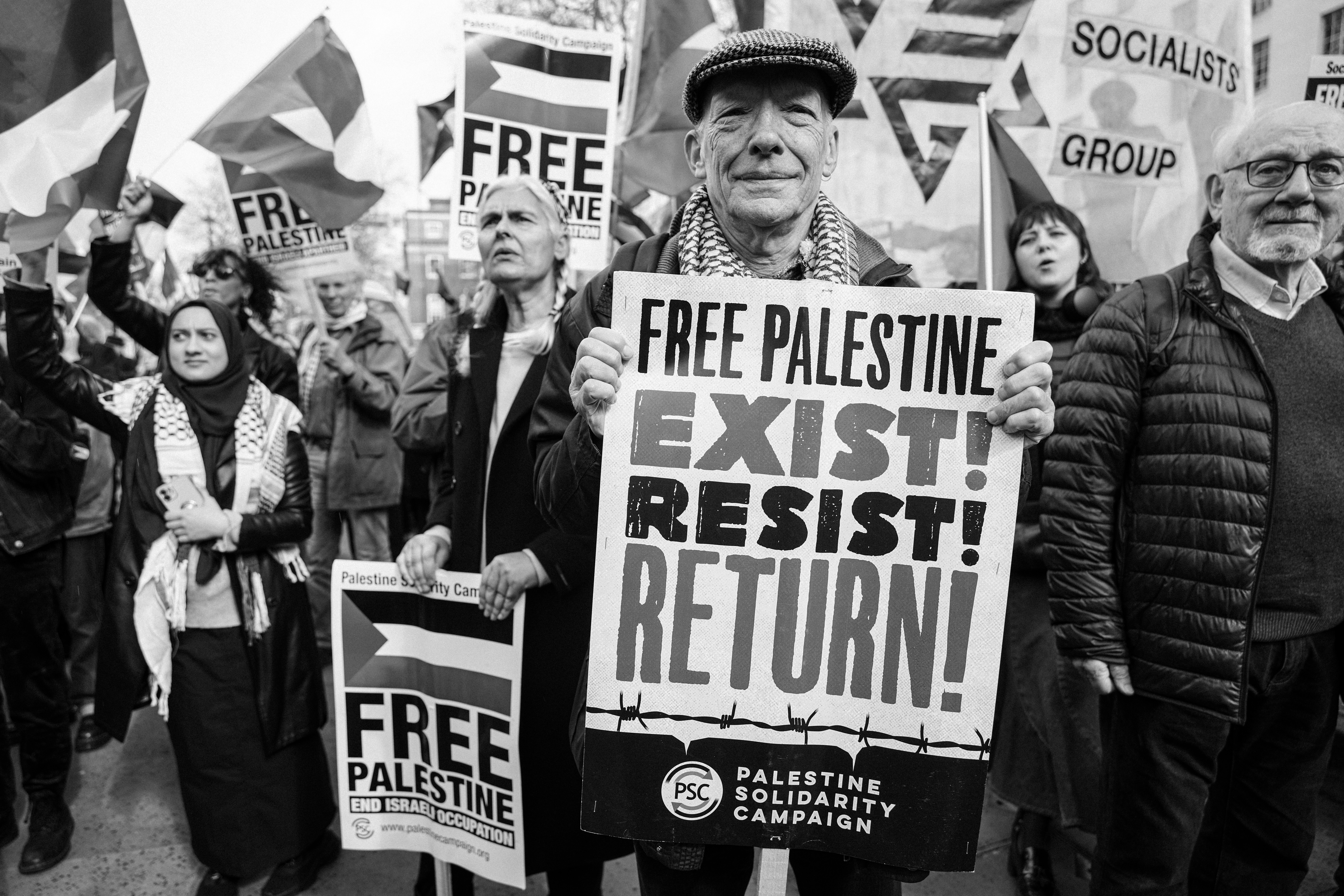
Protest in support of the Palestinian right of return

Even in a supposedly "post-conflict" environment, it is not a simple process for refugees to return home. The UN Pinheiro Principles are guided by the idea that people not only have the right to return home, but also the right to the same property. It seeks to return to the pre-conflict status quo and ensure that no one profits from violence. Yet this is a very complex issue and every situation is different; conflict is a highly transformative force and the pre-war status-quo can never be reestablished completely, even if that were desirable (it may have caused the conflict in the first place). Therefore, the following are of particular importance to the right to return:

- May never have had property (e.g., in Afghanistan)
- Cannot access what property they have (Colombia, Guatemala, South Africa and Sudan)
- Ownership is unclear as families have expanded or split and division of the land becomes an issue
- Death of owner may leave dependents without clear claim to the land
- People settled on the land know it is not theirs but have nowhere else to go (as in Colombia, Rwanda and Timor-Leste)
- Have competing claims with others, including the state and its foreign or local business partners (as in Aceh, Angola, Colombia, Liberia and Sudan).

Refugees who were resettled to a third country will likely lose the indefinite leave to remain in this country if they return to their country of origin or the country of first asylum.

=== Right to non-refoulement ===
Non-refoulement is the right not to be returned to a place of persecution and is the foundation for international refugee law, as outlined in the 1951 Convention Relating to the Status of Refugees. The right to non-refoulement is distinct from the right to asylum. To respect the right to asylum, states must not deport genuine refugees. In contrast, the right to non-refoulement allows states to transfer genuine refugees to third party countries with respectable human rights records. The portable procedural model, proposed by political philosopher Andy Lamey, emphasizes the right to non-refoulement by guaranteeing refugees three procedural rights (to a verbal hearing, to legal counsel, and to judicial review of detention decisions) and ensuring those rights in the constitution. This proposal attempts to strike a balance between the interest of national governments and the interests of refugees.

The principle of non-refoulement is a principle of customary international law, binding on states regardless of treaty obligations. It is also grounded in Article 33 of the Refugee Convention, Article 3 of the Convention against Torture, and Articles 6, 7, and 9 of the International Covenant on Civil and Political Rights (ICCPR). The prohibition against returning a person to a place where they risk facing torture, persecution, or other serious harm is absolute, meaning states cannot use national security or public order as reasons to violate it. The principle of non-refoulement applies to expulsions or returns in any manner, covering both direct and indirect measures. This includes the prohibition of indirect, chain, or secondary refoulement, which means a person should not be deported to a state from which they may face further deportation to a third state where they would be in danger. States are also prohibited from disembarking a refugee in the jurisdiction of another state if they cannot ensure that the refugee would be protected from onward refoulement and treated in accordance with international human rights standards. The principle of non-refoulement is considered a cornerstone of international refugee law and is a fundamental protection against being sent back to a place where one's life or freedom would be threatened. This principle applies to all migrants at all times, regardless of their migration status.

While non-refoulement is a key protection, it does not provide a right to asylum in a specific country. Instead, it ensures that no one is returned to a place where they would be in danger. The right to non-refoulement is distinct from the right to seek asylum, and respecting the right to asylum means that states must not deport genuine refugees. The right to non-refoulement also applies to individuals who may not have formally sought asylum but would still be at risk if returned to their country of origin, and states must be aware of facts that indicate an individual has protection needs. Some countries may try to circumvent non-refoulement by transferring refugees to third countries that are not safe, also called chain or secondary refoulement, which is prohibited. The principle also requires states to ensure that if a refugee is transferred to a third country, that third country will respect the refugee's rights. The principle of non-refoulement is an absolute right, and states cannot justify violating it even in the name of national security or public order.

The principle of non-refoulement prohibits states from transferring or removing from their jurisdiction or effective control when there are substantial grounds for believing that the person would be at risk of irreparable harm upon return, including persecution, torture, ill-treatment, or other serious human rights violations. It is a right that applies regardless of whether a person is formally recognized as a refugee and encompasses situations where a person may not have formally sought asylum but would still be at risk if returned to their country of origin. States must be aware of facts that indicate an individual has protection needs, triggering non-refoulement obligations. The principle applies to expulsions or returns "in any manner whatsoever," encompassing both direct and indirect returns. The right to non-refoulement is enshrined in the Universal Declaration of Human Rights, which states that everyone has the right to seek and enjoy asylum from persecution. Despite international standards, some countries engage in 'pullbacks,' which are measures to prevent people from leaving a country and returning them without allowing them to make asylum claims. Such practices are also a violation of the right to leave a country, as enshrined in the ICCPR.

The principle of non-refoulement extends to situations where a state may be indirectly responsible for refoulement, for instance by returning a person to a country where they are likely to be refouled to a country where they face danger. Some states may attempt to use the concept of 'safe third countries' to transfer refugees, but the receiving country must guarantee protection from persecution and provide access to fair asylum procedures. Non-refoulement is also related to the principle that refugees should not be penalized for their illegal entry or presence if they present themselves without delay to authorities and show good cause for their illegal entry. The European Court of Human Rights has ruled that collectively expelling migrants who are prevented from requesting asylum is a violation of their right to be protected from inhuman or degrading treatment. The African Refugee Convention also addresses non-refoulement, stating that no person shall be subjected to measures that would compel them to return to a territory where their life, physical integrity, or liberty would be threatened. Additionally, the African Refugee Convention emphasizes the voluntary nature of repatriation, ensuring that no refugee is repatriated against their will. The convention also prohibits refugees from engaging in subversive activities against any member state of the Organization of African Unity. The Dublin Regulation, which is an EU law, also impacts non-refoulement by outlining procedures for the protection of asylum applicants, including guarantees for minors and the right to appeal transfer decisions, but there are concerns about the application of the 'safe third country' concept. The EU-Turkey deal, for example, has faced criticism due to concerns that Turkey may not be a safe third country for refugees. Some reports indicate that some Syrian asylum-seekers have been forcibly returned to Turkey without access to asylum procedures and despite Greek courts blocking returns.

=== Right to family reunification ===
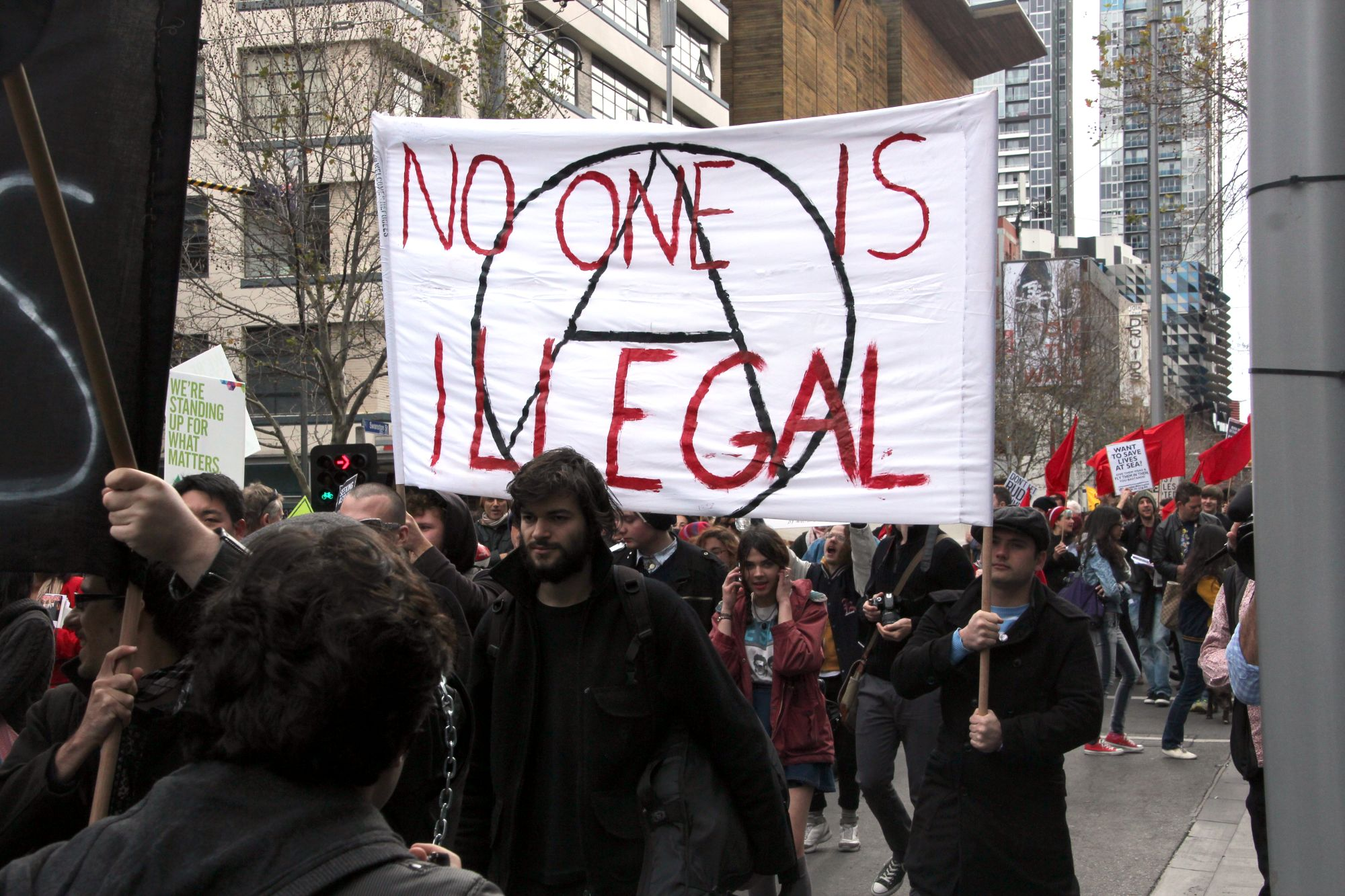
Pro-refugee protest in Melbourne, Australia, with a banner reading "No one is illegal" with a Circle A

Family reunification (which can also be a form of resettlement) is a recognized reason for immigration in many countries. Divided families have the right to be reunited if a family member with permanent right of residency applies for the reunification and can prove the people on the application were a family unit before arrival and wish to live as a family unit since separation. If application is successful this enables the rest of the family to immigrate to that country as well.

=== Right to travel ===
Those states that signed the Convention Relating to the Status of Refugees are obliged to issue travel documents (i.e. "Convention Travel Document") to refugees lawfully residing in their territory. (Note: Under Article 28 of the Convention.) It is a valid travel document in place of a passport, however, it cannot be used to travel to the country of origin, i.e. from where the refugee fled.

=== Restriction of onward movement ===
Once refugees or asylum seekers have found a safe place and protection of a state or territory outside their territory of origin they are discouraged from leaving again and seeking protection in another country. If they do move onward into a second country of asylum this movement is also called "irregular movement" by the UNHCR (see also asylum shopping). UNHCR support in the second country may be less than in the first country and they can even be returned to the first country.

== World Refugee Day ==
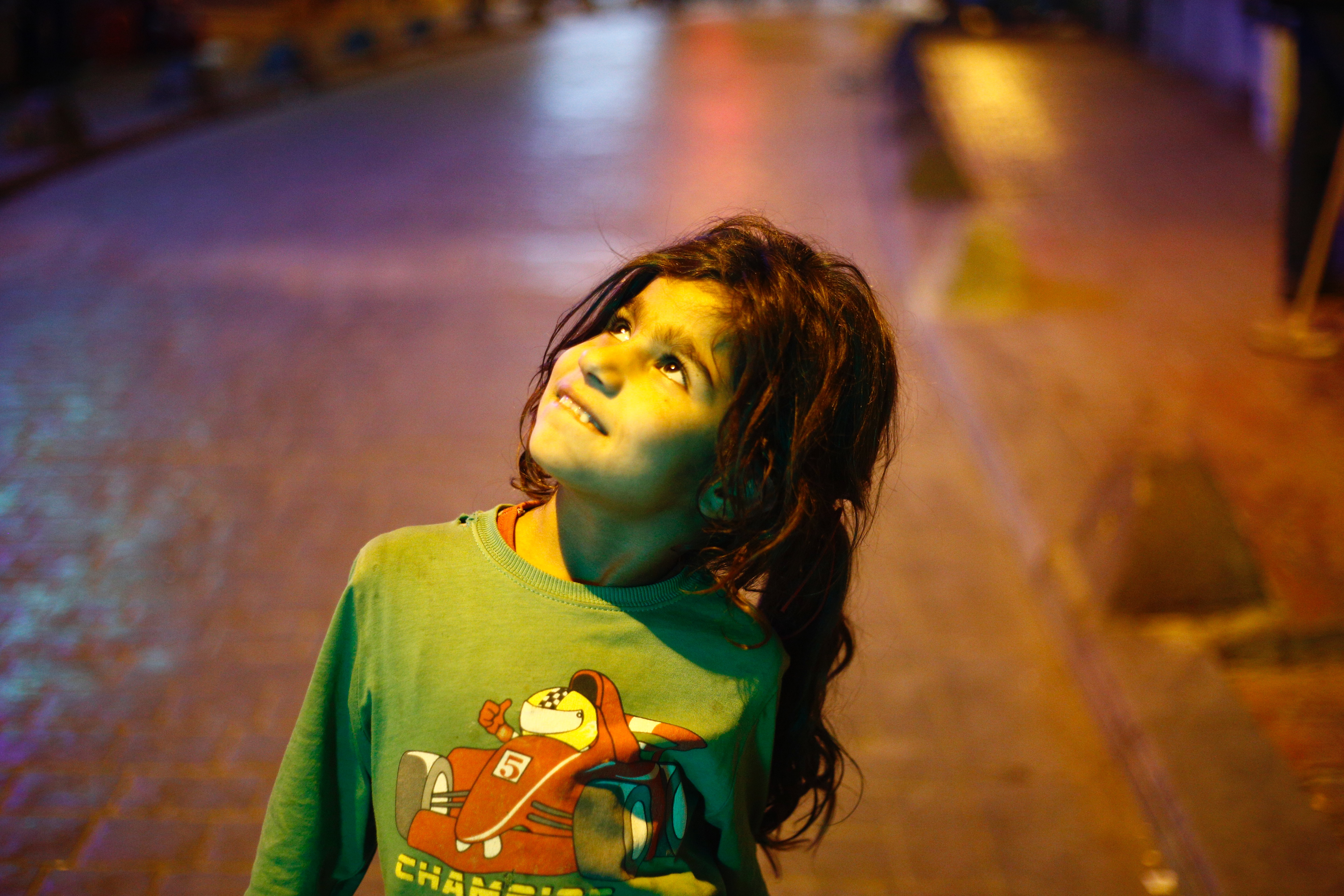
A Syrian refugee girl in Istanbul, Turkey

World Refugee Day has occurred annually on 20 June since 2000 by a special United Nations General Assembly Resolution. 20 June had previously been commemorated as "African Refugee Day" in a number of African countries.

In the United Kingdom World Refugee Day is celebrated as part of Refugee Week. Refugee Week is a nationwide festival designed to promote understanding and to celebrate the cultural contributions of refugees, and features many events such as music, dance and theatre.

In the Roman Catholic Church, the World Day of Migrants and Refugees is celebrated in January each year, since instituted in 1914 by Pope Pius X.

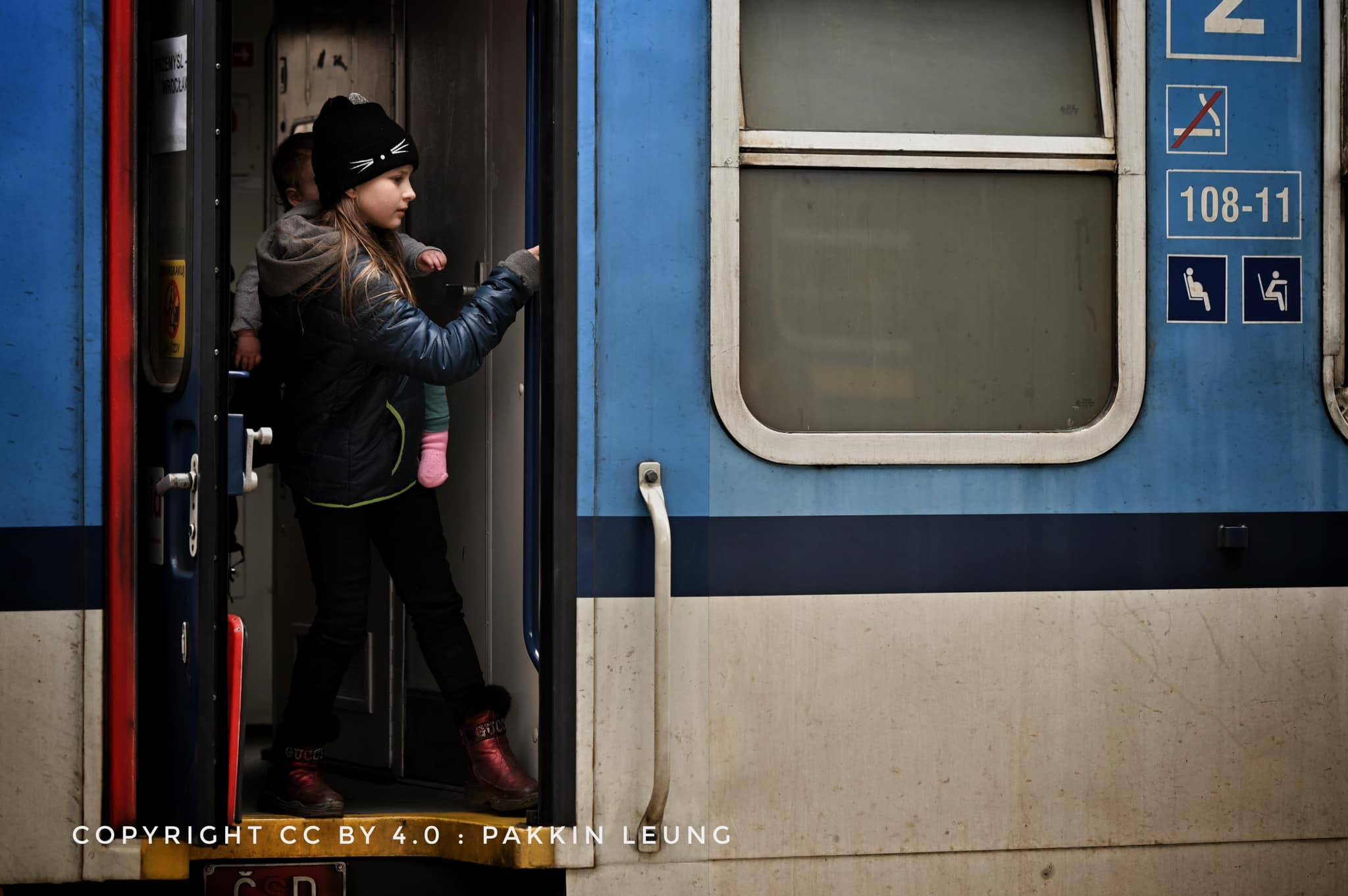
Ukrainian refugees inside a train at Przemyśl Główny station in Poland

== Issues ==
=== Protracted displacement ===
Displacement is a long lasting reality for most refugees. Two-thirds of all refugees around the world have been displaced for over three years, which is known as being in 'protracted displacement'. 50% of refugees—around 10 million people—have been displaced for over ten years.

Protracted displacement can lead to detrimental effects on refugee employment and refugee workforce integration, exacerbating the effect of the canvas ceiling. Protracted displacement leads to skills to atrophy, leading qualifications and experiences to be outdated and incompatible to the changing working environments of receiving countries by the time refugees resettle.

The Overseas Development Institute has found that aid programmes need to move from short-term models of assistance (such as food or cash handouts) to more sustainable long-term programmes that help refugees become more self-reliant. This can involve tackling difficult legal and economic environments, by improving social services, job opportunities and laws.

=== Medical problems ===
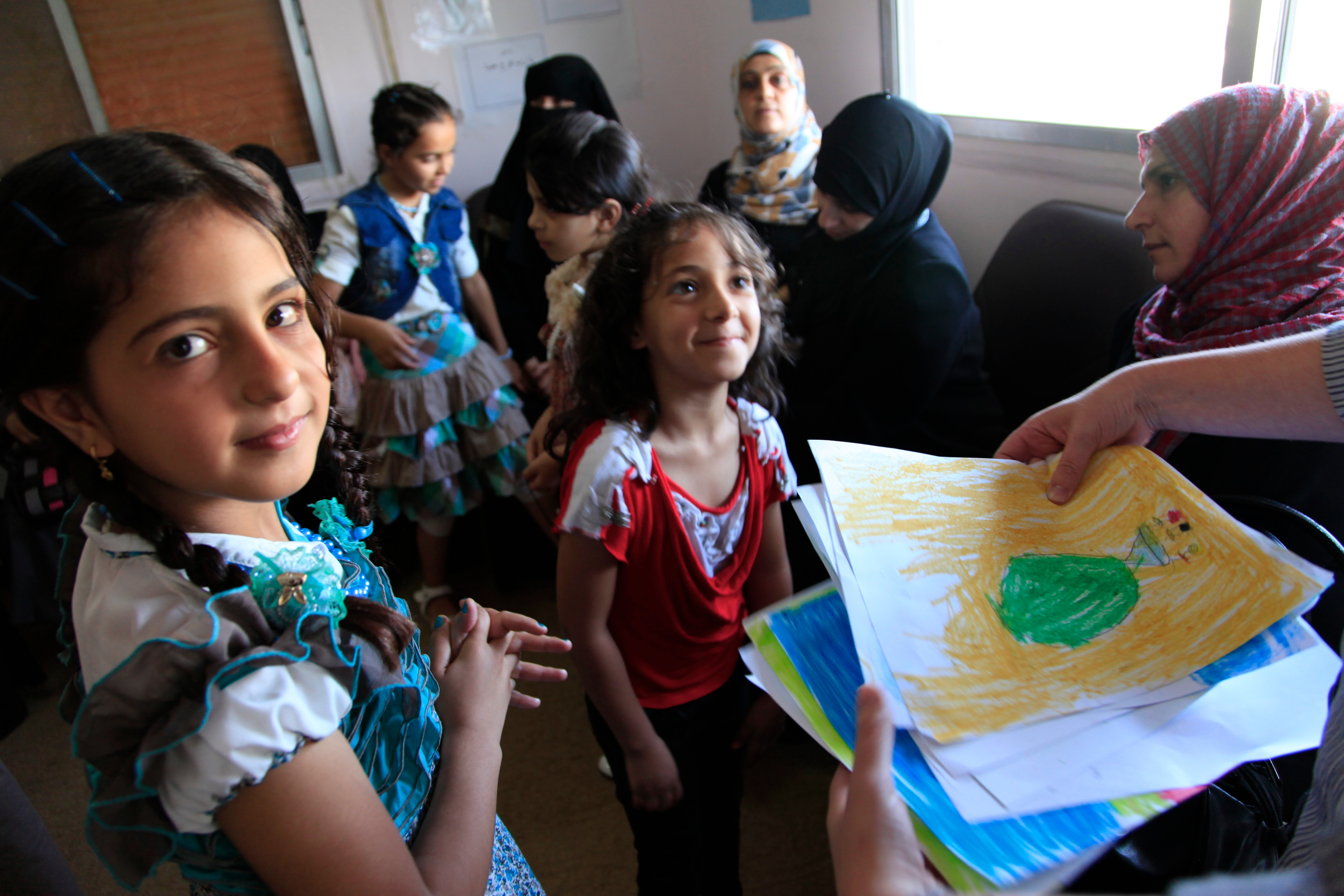
Refugee children from Syria at a clinic in Ramtha, Jordan, August 2013

Refugees typically report poorer levels of health, compared to other immigrants and the non-immigrant population.

==== PTSD ====
Apart from physical wounds or starvation, a large percentage of refugees develop symptoms of post-traumatic stress disorder (PTSD), and show post-traumatic stress symptoms (PTSS) or depression. These long-term mental problems can severely impede the functionality of the person in everyday situations; it makes matters even worse for displaced persons who are confronted with a new environment and challenging situations. They are also at high risk for suicide.

Among other symptoms, post-traumatic stress disorder involves anxiety, over-alertness, sleeplessness, motor difficulties, failing short term memory, amnesia, nightmares and sleep-paralysis. Flashbacks are characteristic to the disorder: the patient experiences the traumatic event, or pieces of it, again and again. Depression is also characteristic for PTSD-patients and may also occur without accompanying PTSD.

PTSD was diagnosed in 34.1% of Palestinian children, most of whom were refugees, males, and working. The participants were 1,000 children aged 12 to 16 years from governmental, private, and United Nations Relief Work Agency UNRWA schools in East Jerusalem and various governorates in the West Bank.

Another study showed that 28.3% of Bosnian refugee women had symptoms of PTSD three or four years after their arrival in Sweden. These women also had significantly higher risks of symptoms of depression, anxiety, and psychological distress than Swedish-born women. For depression the odds ratio was 9.50 among Bosnian women.

A study by the Department of Pediatrics and Emergency Medicine at the Boston University School of Medicine demonstrated that twenty percent of Sudanese refugee minors living in the United States had a diagnosis of post-traumatic stress disorder. They were also more likely to have worse scores on all the Child Health Questionnaire subscales.

In a study for the United Kingdom, refugees were found to be 4 percentage points more likely to report a mental health problem compared to the non-immigrant population. This contrasts with the results for other immigrant groups, which were less likely to report a mental health problem compared to the non-immigrant population.

Many more studies illustrate the problem. One meta-study was conducted by the psychiatry department of Oxford University at Warneford Hospital in the United Kingdom. Twenty surveys were analyzed, providing results for 6,743 adult refugees from seven countries. In the larger studies, 9% were diagnosed with post-traumatic stress disorder and 5% with major depression, with evidence of much psychiatric co-morbidity. Five surveys of 260 refugee children from three countries yielded a prevalence of 11% for post-traumatic stress disorder. According to this study, refugees resettled in Western countries could be about ten times more likely to have PTSD than age-matched general populations in those countries. Worldwide, tens of thousands of refugees and former refugees resettled in Western countries probably have post-traumatic stress disorder.

=== Malaria ===
Refugees are often more susceptible to illness for several reasons, including a lack of immunity to local strains of malaria and other diseases. Displacement of a people can create favorable conditions for disease transmission. Refugee camps are typically heavily populated with poor sanitary conditions. The removal of vegetation for space, building materials or firewood also deprives mosquitoes of their natural habitats, leading them to more closely interact with humans. In the 1970s, Afghanese refugees that were relocated to Pakistan were going from a country with an effective malaria control strategy, to a country with a less effective system.

The refugee camps were built near rivers or irrigation sites had higher malaria prevalence than refugee camps built on dry lands. The location of the camps lent themselves to better breeding grounds for mosquitoes, and thus a higher likelihood of malaria transmission. Children aged 1–15 were the most susceptible to malaria infection, which is a significant cause of mortality in children younger than 5. Malaria was the cause of 16% of the deaths in refugee children younger than 5 years of age. Malaria is one of the most commonly reported causes of death in refugees and displaced persons. Since 2014, reports of malaria cases in Germany had doubled compared to previous years, with the majority of cases found in refugees from Eritrea.

The World Health Organization recommends that all people in areas that are endemic for malaria use long-lasting insecticide nets. A cohort study found that within refugee camps in Pakistan, insecticide treated bed nets were very useful in reducing malaria cases. A single treatment of the nets with the insecticide permethrin remained protective throughout the 6 month transmission season.

=== Access to healthcare services ===
Access to services depends on many factors, including whether a refugee has received official status, is situated within a refugee camp, or is in the process of third country resettlement. The UNHCR recommends integrating access to primary care and emergency health services with the host country in as equitable a manner as possible. Prioritized services include areas of maternal and child health, immunizations, tuberculosis screening and treatment, and HIV/AIDS-related services. Despite inclusive stated policies for refugee access to health care on the international levels, potential barriers to that access include language, cultural preferences, high financial costs, administrative hurdles, and physical distance. Specific barriers and policies related to health service access also emerge based on the host country context. For example, primaquine, an often recommended malaria treatment is not currently licensed for use in Germany and must be ordered from outside the country.

In Canada, barriers to healthcare access include the lack of adequately trained physicians, complex medical conditions of some refugees and the bureaucracy of medical coverage. There are also individual barriers to access such as language and transportation barriers, institutional barriers such as bureaucratic burdens and lack of entitlement knowledge, and systems level barriers such as conflicting policies, racism and physician workforce shortage.

In the US, all officially designated Iraqi refugees had health insurance coverage compared to a little more than half of non-Iraqi immigrants in a Dearborn, Michigan, study. However, greater barriers existed around transportation, language and successful stress coping mechanisms for refugees versus other immigrants, in addition, refugees noted greater medical conditions. The study also found that refugees had higher healthcare utilization rate (92.1%) as compared to the US overall population (84.8%) and immigrants (58.6%) in the study population.

Within Australia, officially designated refugees who qualify for temporary protection and offshore humanitarian refugees are eligible for health assessments, interventions and access to health insurance schemes and trauma-related counseling services. Despite being eligible to access services, barriers include economic constraints around perceived and actual costs carried by refugees. In addition, refugees must cope with a healthcare workforce unaware of the unique health needs of refugee populations. Perceived legal barriers such as fear that disclosing medical conditions prohibiting reunification of family members and current policies which reduce assistance programs may also limit access to health care services.

Providing access to healthcare for refugees through integration into the current health systems of host countries may also be difficult when operating in a resource limited setting. In this context, barriers to healthcare access may include political aversion in the host country and already strained capacity of the existing health system. Political aversion to refugee access into the existing health system may stem from the wider issue of refugee resettlement. One approach to limiting such barriers is to move from a parallel administrative system in which UNHCR refugees may receive better healthcare than host nationals but is unsustainable financially and politically to that of an integrated care where refugee and host nationals receive equal and more improved care all around. In the 1980s, Pakistan attempted to address Afghan refugee healthcare access through the creation of Basic Health Units inside the camps. Funding cuts closed many of these programs, forcing refugees to seek healthcare from the local government. In response to a protracted refugee situation in the West Nile district, Ugandan officials with UNHCR created an integrative healthcare model for the mostly Sudanese refugee population and Ugandan citizens. Local nationals now access health care in facilities initially created for refugees.

One potential argument for limiting refugee access to healthcare is associated with costs with states desire to decrease health expenditure burdens. However, Germany found that restricting refugee access led to an increase actual expenditures relative to refugees which had full access to healthcare services. The legal restrictions on access to health care and the administrative barriers in Germany have been criticized since the 1990s for leading to delayed care, for increasing direct costs and administrative costs of health care, and for shifting the responsibility for care from the less expensive primary care sector to costly treatments for acute conditions in the secondary and tertiary sector.

=== Exploitation ===
Refugee populations consist of people who are terrified and are away from familiar surroundings. There can be instances of exploitation at the hands of enforcement officials, citizens of the host country, and even United Nations peacekeepers. Instances of human rights violations, child labor, mental and physical trauma/torture, violence-related trauma, and sexual exploitation, especially of children, have been documented. In many refugee camps in three war-torn West African countries, Sierra Leone, Guinea, and Liberia, young girls were found to be exchanging sex for money, a handful of fruit, or even a bar of soap. Most of these girls were between 13 and 18 years of age. In most cases, if the girls had been forced to stay, they would have been forced into marriage. They became pregnant around the age of 15 on average. This happened as recently as in 2001. Parents tended to turn a blind eye because sexual exploitation had become a "mechanism of survival" in these camps.

Large groups of displaced persons could be abused as "weapons" to threaten political enemies or neighbouring countries. It is for this reason amongst others that the United Nations Sustainable Development Goal 10 aims to facilitate orderly, safe, regular and responsible mobility of people through planned and well-managed migration policies.

Concerns about human trafficking and sexual violence have been realized during the 2022–present Ukrainian refugee crisis. European Commissioner for Home Affairs Ylva Johansson said: "We have some indications on online services that the demand for Ukrainian women for sexual purposes has gone up." According to USA Today, "there has been a skyrocketing increase in all forms of illegal trafficking of women and girls in the region – and also boys – including forced sex and labor, prostitution, pornography and other forms of sexual exploitation... In recent weeks, online searches for Ukrainian women and keywords like escorts, porn or sex have shot up dramatically in European countries, according to the Organization for Security and Co-operation in Europe (OSCE)."

=== Crime ===
Little empirical evidence supports concerns that refugees commit crimes at higher rates than natives, and some evidence suggests they may commit crime at lower rates than natives. Very rarely, refugees have been used and recruited as refugee militants or terrorists, and the humanitarian aid directed at refugee relief has very rarely been utilized to fund the acquisition of arms. Although conclusions from case-studies of refugee-mobilizations raised concerns that humanitarian aid may support rebel groups, more recent empirical evidence does not support the generalizability of these concerns. Support from a refugee-receiving state has rarely been used to enable refugees to mobilize militarily, enabling conflict to spread across borders.

Historically, refugee populations have often been portrayed as a security threat. In the U.S and Europe, there has been much focus on a narrative whereby terrorists maintain networks amongst transnational, refugee, and migrant populations. This fear has been exaggerated into a modern-day Islamist terrorism Trojan Horse in which terrorists allegedly hide among refugees and penetrate host countries. 'Muslim-refugee-as-an-enemy-within' rhetoric is relatively new, but the underlying scapegoating of out-groups for domestic societal problems, fears and ethno-nationalist sentiment is not new. In the 1890s, the influx of Eastern European Jewish refugees to London coupled with the rise of anarchism in the city led to a confluence of threat-perception and fear of the refugee out-group. Populist rhetoric then too propelled debate over migration control and protecting national security.

Cross-national empirical verification, or rejection, of populist suspicion and fear of refugees' threat to national security and terror-related activities is relatively scarce. Case-studies suggest that the threat of an Islamist refugee Trojan Horse is highly exaggerated. Of the 800,000 refugees vetted through the resettlement program in the United States between 2001 and 2016, only five were subsequently arrested on terrorism charges; and 17 of the 600,000 Iraqis and Syrians who arrived in Germany in 2015 were investigated for terrorism. One study found that European jihadists tend to be 'homegrown': over 90% were residents of a European country and 60% had European citizenship. While the statistics do not support the rhetoric, a PEW Research Center survey of ten European countries (Hungary, Poland, Netherlands, Germany, Italy, Sweden, Greece, UK, France, and Spain) released on 11 July 2016, finds that majorities (ranging from 52% to 76%) of respondents in eight countries (Hungary, Poland, Netherlands, Germany, Italy, Sweden, Greece, and UK) think refugees increase the likelihood of terrorism in their country. Since 1975, in the U.S., the risk of dying in a terror attack by a refugee is 1 in 3.6 billion per year; whereas the odds of dying in a motor vehicle crash are 1 in 113; by state sanctioned execution: 1 in 111,439; or by dog attack: 1 in 114,622.

In Europe, fear of immigration, Islamification and job and welfare-benefits competition has fueled an increase in violence. Immigrants are perceived as a threat to ethno-nationalist identity and increase concerns over criminality and insecurity.

In the PEW survey previously referenced, 50% of respondents saw refugees as a burden due to job and social-benefit competition. When Sweden received over 160,000 asylum seekers in 2015, the influx was accompanied by 50 attacks against asylum-seekers, which was more than four times the number of attacks that occurred in the previous four years. At the incident level, the 2011 Utøya Norway terror attack by Breivik demonstrates the impact of this threat perception on a country's risk from domestic terrorism, in particular ethno-nationalist extremism. Breivik portrayed himself as a protector of Norwegian ethnic identity and national security, fighting against (alleged) immigrant criminality, competition and welfare-abuse and an Islamic takeover.

Contrary to popular concerns that refugees commit crime, a more empirically grounded concern is that refugees are at high risk of being targets of anti-refugee violence. According to a 2018 study in the Journal of Peace Research, states often resort to anti-refugee violence in response to terrorist attacks or to security crises. The study notes that there is evidence to suggest that "the repression of refugees is more consistent with a scapegoating mechanism than the actual ties and involvement of refugees in terrorism".

In 2018, US president Donald Trump made some comments about refugees and immigrants in Sweden; he stated that the high numbers of crimes are because of refugees and immigrants.

=== International relations ===
Alexander Betts highlights the phenomenon of refugees as "indicative of a breakdown of the nation-state system".

=== Representation ===
The category of "refugee" tends to have a universalizing effect on those classified as such. It draws upon the common humanity of a mass of people in order to inspire public empathy, but doing so can have the unintended consequence of silencing refugee stories and erasing the political and historical factors that led to their present state. Humanitarian groups and media outlets often rely on images of refugees that evoke emotional responses and are said to speak for themselves. The refugees in these images, however, are not asked to elaborate on their experiences, and thus, their narratives are all but erased. From the perspective of the international community, "refugee" is a performative status equated with injury, ill health, and poverty. When people no longer display these traits, they are no longer seen as ideal refugees, even if they still fit the legal definition. For this reason, there is a need to improve current humanitarian efforts by acknowledging the "narrative authority, historical agency, and political memory" of refugees alongside their shared humanity. Dehistorizing and depoliticizing refugees can have dire consequences. Rwandan refugees in Tanzanian camps, for example, were pressured to return to their home country before they believed it was truly safe to do so. Despite the fact that refugees, drawing on their political history and experiences, claimed that Tutsi forces still posed a threat to them in Rwanda, their narrative was overshadowed by the U.N. assurances of safety. When the refugees did return home, reports of reprisals against them, land seizures, disappearances, and incarceration abounded, as they had feared.

== Employment ==
Integrating refugees into the workforce is one of the most important steps to overall integration of this particular migrant group. Many refugees are unemployed, under-employed, under-paid and work in the informal economy, if not receiving public assistance. Refugees encounter many barriers in receiving countries in finding and sustaining employment commensurate with their experience and expertise. A systemic barrier that is situated across multiple levels (i.e. institutional, organizational and individual levels) is coined "canvas ceiling".

== Education ==
Refugee children come from many different backgrounds, and their reasons for resettlement are even more diverse. The number of refugee children has continued to increase as conflicts interrupt communities at a global scale. In 2014 alone, there were approximately 32 armed conflicts in 26 countries around the world, and this period saw the highest number of refugees ever recorded Refugee children experience traumatic events in their lives that can affect their learning capabilities, even after they have resettled in first or second settlement countries. Educators such as teachers, counselors, and school staff, along with the school environment, are key in facilitating socialization and acculturation of recently arrived refugee and immigrant children in their new schools.

=== Obstacles ===
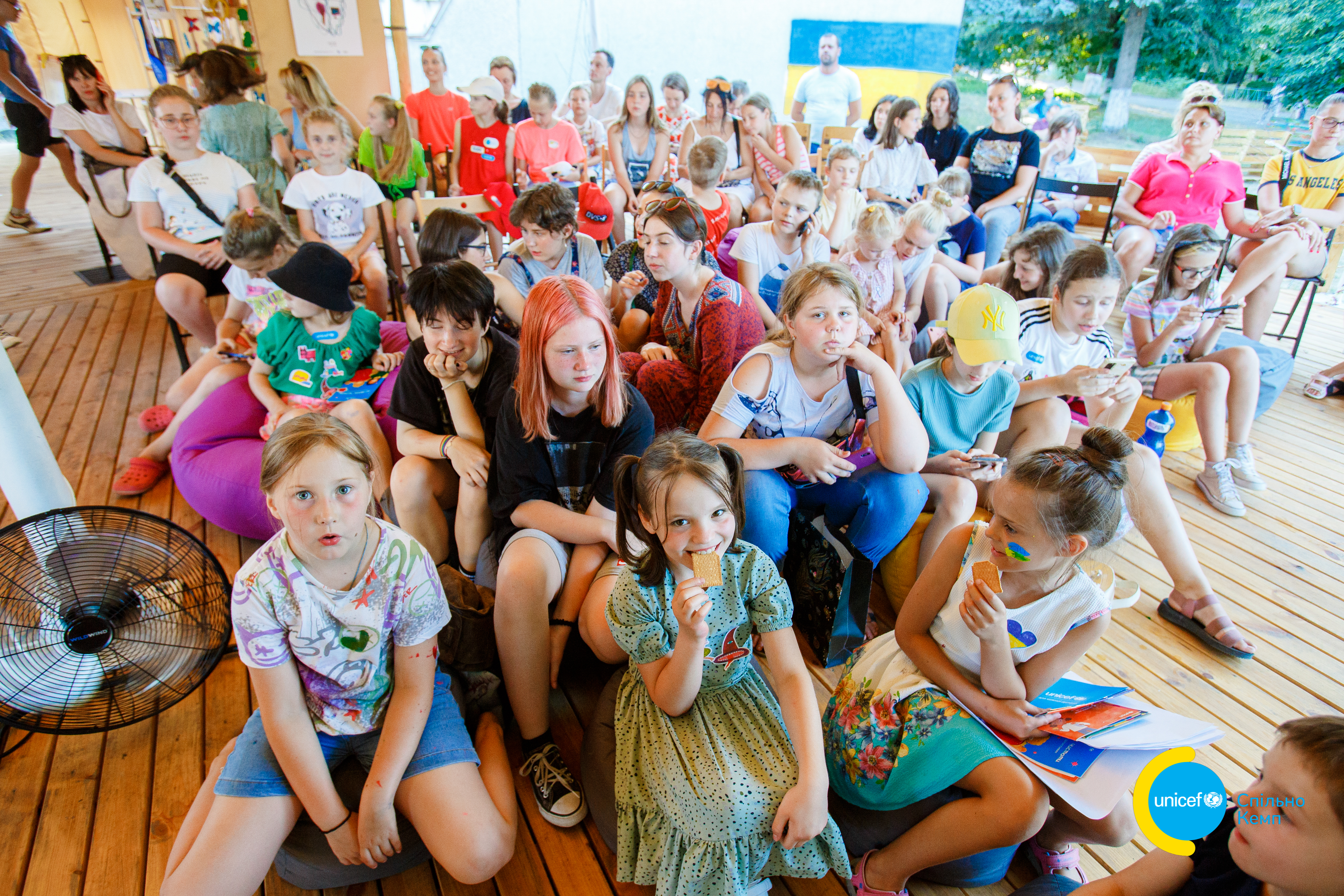
Internally displaced children from other parts of Ukraine in the Zakarpattia Oblast of western Ukraine

The experiences children go through during times of armed conflict can impede their ability to learn in an educational setting. Schools experience drop-outs of refugee and immigrant students from an array of factors such as: rejection by peers, low self-esteem, antisocial behavior, negative perceptions of their academic ability, and lack of support from school staff and parents. Because refugees come from various regions globally with their own cultural, religious, linguistic, and home practices, the new school culture can conflict with the home culture, causing tension between the student and their family.

Aside from students, teachers and school staff also face their own obstacles in working with refugee students. They have concerns about their ability to meet the mental, physical, emotional, and educational needs of students. One study of newly arrived Bantu students from Somalia in a Chicago school questioned whether schools were equipped to provide them with a quality education that met the needs of the pupils. The students were not aware of how to use pencils, which caused them to break the tips requiring frequent sharpening. Teachers may even see refugee students as different from other immigrant groups, as was the case with the Bantu pupils. Teachers may sometimes feel that their work is made harder because of the pressures to meet state requirements for testing. With refugee children falling behind or struggling to catch up, it can overwhelm teachers and administrators, further leading to anger.

Not all students adjust the same way to their new setting. One student may take only three months, while others may take four years. One study found that even in their fourth year of schooling, Lao and Vietnamese refugee students in the US were still in a transitional status. Refugee students continue to encounter difficulties throughout their years in schools that can hinder their ability to learn. Furthermore, to provide proper support, educators must consider the experiences of students before they settled the US.

In their first settlement countries, refugee students may encounter negative experiences with education that they can carry with them post settlement. For example:

- Frequent disruption in their education as they move from place to place
- Limited access to schooling
- Language barriers
- Little resources to support language development and learning, and more

Statistics found that in places such as Uganda and Kenya, there were gaps in refugee students attending schools. It found that 80% of refugees in Uganda were attending schools, whereas only 46% of students were attending schools in Kenya. Furthermore, for secondary levels, the numbers were much lower. There was only 1.4% of refugee students attending schools in Malaysia. This trend is evident across several first settlement countries and carry negative impacts on students once they arrive to their permanent settlement homes, such as the US, and have to navigate a new education system. Some refugees do not have a chance to attend schools in their first settlement countries because they are considered undocumented immigrants in places like Malaysia for Rohingya refugees. In other cases, such as Burundians in Tanzania, refugees can get more access to education while in displacement than in their home countries.

=== Overcoming obstacles ===
All students need some form of support to help them overcome obstacles and challenges they may face in their lives, especially refugee children who may experience frequent disruptions. There are a few ways in which schools can help refugee students overcome obstacles to attain success in their new homes:

- Respect the cultural differences amongst refugees and the new home culture
- Individual efforts to welcome refugees to prevent feelings of isolation
- Educator support
- Student centered pedagogy as opposed to teacher centered
- Building relationships with the students
- Offering praise and providing affirmations
- Providing extensive support and designing curriculum for students to read, write, and speak in their native languages.

One school in NYC has found a method that works for them to help refugee students succeed. This school creates support for language and literacies, which promotes students using English and their native languages to complete projects. Furthermore, they have a learning centered pedagogy, which promotes the idea that there are multiple entry points to engage the students in learning. Both strategies have helped refugee students succeed during their transition into US schools.

Various websites contain resources that can help school staff better learn to work with refugee students such as Bridging Refugee Youth and Children's Services. With the support of educators and the school community, education can help rebuild the academic, social, and emotional well-being of refugee students who have suffered from past and present trauma, marginalization, and social alienation.

=== Cultural differences ===
It is important to understand the cultural differences amongst newly arrived refugees and school culture, such as that of the U.S. This can be seen as problematic because of the frequent disruptions that it can create in a classroom setting.

In addition, because of the differences in language and culture, students are often placed in lower classes due to their lack of English proficiency. Students can also be made to repeat classes because of their lack of English proficiency, even if they have mastered the content of the class. When schools have the resources and are able to provide separate classes for refugee students to develop their English skills, it can take the average refugee students only three months to catch up with their peers. This was the case with Somali refugees at some primary schools in Nairobi.

The histories of refugee students are often hidden from educators, resulting in cultural misunderstandings. However, when teachers, school staff, and peers help refugee students develop a positive cultural identity, it can help buffer the negative effects refugees' experiences have on them, such as poor academic performance, isolation, and discrimination.

== Refugee crisis ==
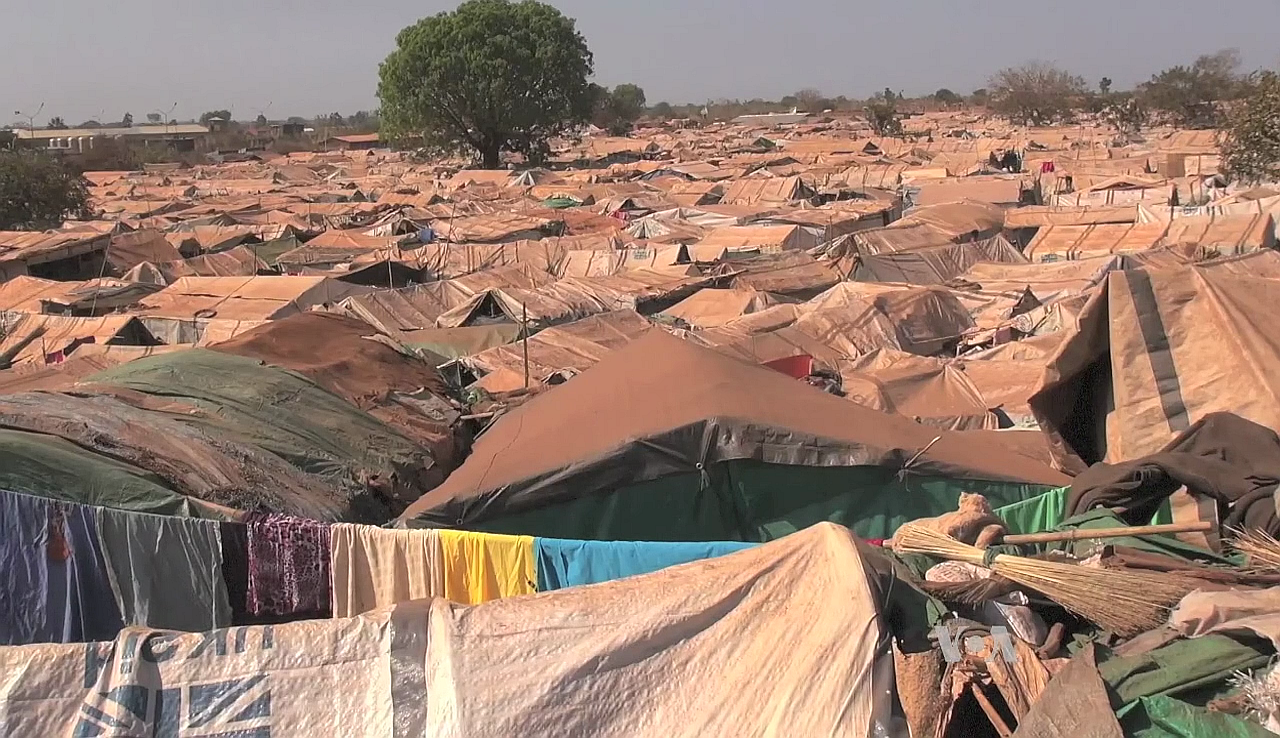
Refugee camp in South Sudan, 2016

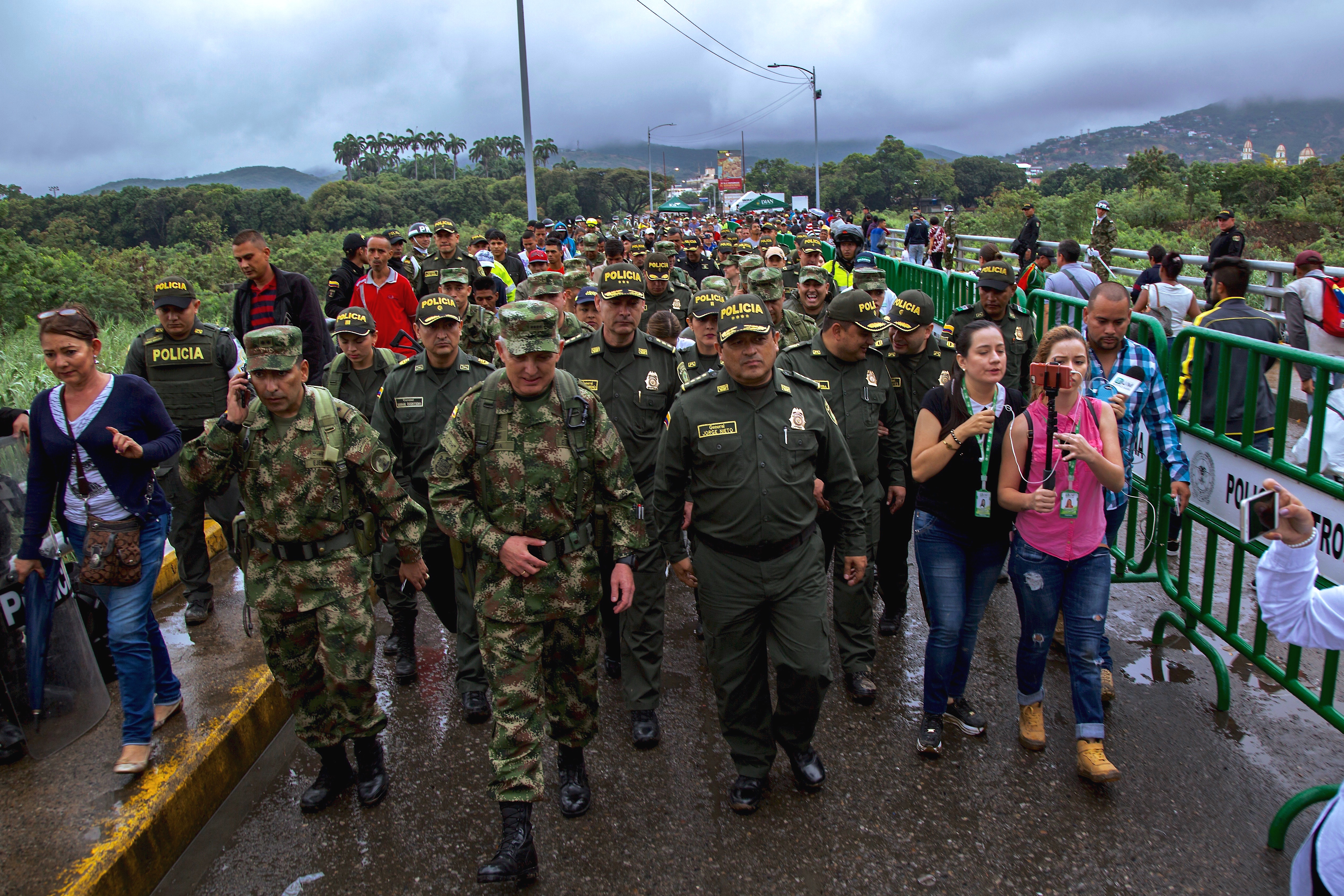
Colombian National Police leading Venezuelan refugees into Cúcuta

Refugee crisis can refer to movements of large groups of displaced persons, who could be either internally displaced persons, refugees or other migrants. It can also refer to incidents in the country of origin or departure, to large problems whilst on the move or even after arrival in a safe country that involve large groups of displaced persons. At the end of 2020, the UNHCR estimated the number of forcibly displaced people to be about 82.4 million worldwide. Of those, 26.4 million (nearly a third) are refugees while 4.1 million were classified as asylum seekers and 48 million being internally displaced. 68% of refugees originates from just five countries (Syria, Venezuela, Afghanistan and South Sudan and Myanmar). 86% of refugees are hosted in developing countries, with Turkey, hosting 3.7 million refugees, being the top hosting country. In 2024, UNHCR Updates this number to estimately 123.2 million people worldwide.

In 2006, there were 8.4 million UNHCR registered refugees worldwide, the lowest number since 1980. At the end of 2015, there were 16.1 million refugees worldwide. When adding the 5.2 million Palestinian refugees who are under UNRWA's mandate there were 21.3 million refugees worldwide. The overall forced displacement worldwide has reached a total of 65.3 million displaced persons at the end of 2015, while it was 59.5 million 12 months earlier. One in every 113 people globally is an asylum seeker or a refugee. In 2015, the total number of displaced people worldwide, including refugees, asylum seekers and internally displaced persons, was at its highest level on record.

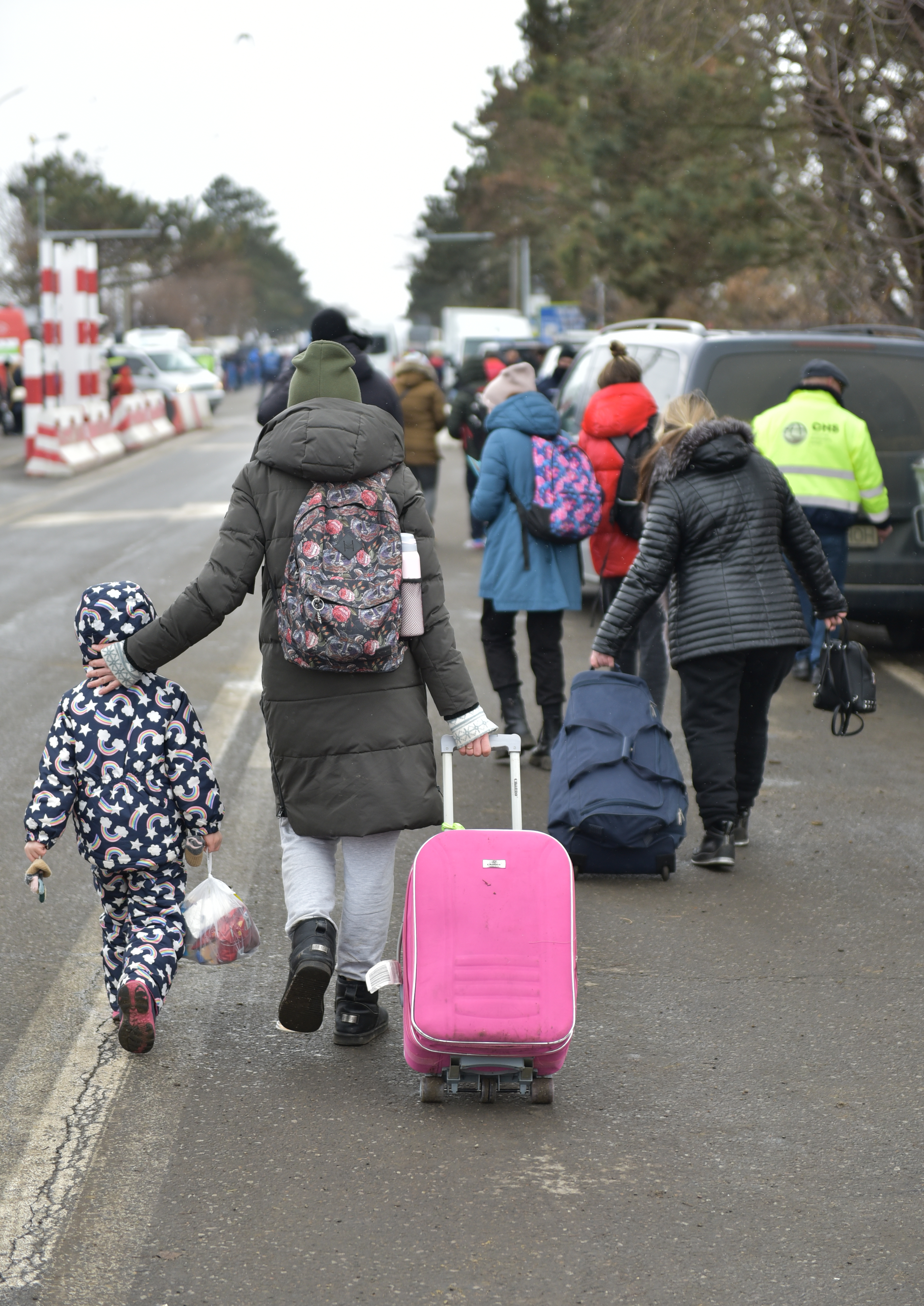
Ukrainian refugees fleeing after the 2022 Russian invasion of Ukraine, 5 March 2022

Among them, Syrian refugees were the largest group in 2015 at 4.9 million. In 2014, Syrians had overtaken Afghan refugees (2.7 million), who had been the largest refugee group for three decades. Somalis were the third largest group with one million. The countries hosting the largest number of refugees according to UNHCR were Turkey (2.5 million), Pakistan (1.6 million), Lebanon (1.1 million) and Iran (1 million). the countries that had the largest numbers of internally displaced people were Colombia at 6.9, Syria at 6.6 million and Iraq at 4.4 million.

Self-identified minors were around 51% of refugees in 2015 and most of them were unaccompanied minors. Forensic examinations found a significant share of self-identified minors were adults. In 2015, 86% of the refugees under UNHCR's mandate were in low and middle-income countries that themselves are close to situations of conflict. Refugees have historically tended to flee to nearby countries with ethnic kin populations and a history of accepting other co-ethnic refugees. The religious, sectarian and denominational affiliation has been an important feature of debate in refugee-hosting nations.

An ongoing refugee crisis began in Europe in late February 2022 after Russia's invasion of Ukraine. Over 8.2 million refugees fleeing Ukraine have been recorded across Europe, while an estimated 8 million others had been displaced within the country by late May 2022.

Refugees and people in refugee-like situations by region between 2008 and 2022
Region (UN major area)	2022	2021	2020	2019	2018	2017	2016	2014	2013	2012	2011	2010	2009	2008
Africa	7,545,579	7,483,184	7,064,848	6,803,799	6,775,502	6,687,326	5,531,693	4,126,800	3,377,700	3,068,300	2,924,100	2,408,700	2,300,100	2,332,900
Asia	12,271,919	9,845,603	9,753,909	9,892,341	10,111,523	9,945,930	8,608,597	7,942,100	6,317,500	5,060,100	5,104,100	5,715,800	5,620,500	5,706,400
Europe	8,728,098	3,189,403	3,000,709	2,958,113	2,760,771	2,602,942	2,300,833	1,500,500	1,152,800	1,522,100	1,534,400	1,587,400	1,628,100	1,613,400
Latin America and the Caribbean	292,860	265,306	305,887	255,501	215,924	252,288	322,403	352,700	382,000	380,700	377,800	373,900	367,400	350,300
Northern America	507,782	473,211	453,804	446,151	427,350	391,907	370,291	416,400	424,000	425,800	429,600	430,100	444,900	453,200
Oceania	66,795	70,210	71,158	89,994	69,492	60,954	53,671	46,800	45,300	41,000	34,800	33,800	35,600	33,600
Total	29,413,033	21,326,917	20,650,315	20,445,899	20,360,562	19,941,347	17,187,488	14,385,300	11,699,300	10,498,000	10,404,800	10,549,700	10,396,600	10,489,800

== See also ==
- Asylum shopping
- British Committee for Refugees from Czechoslovakia
- Conservation refugee, people displaced when conservation areas are created
- Church asylum
- Deportation
- Diaspora, a mass movement of population, usually forced by war or natural disaster
- Emergencybnb, a website to find accommodation for refugees
- Emergency evacuation
- Forced displacement in popular culture
- Ghost town repopulation
- HIAS
- Homo sacer, a banned person who may be killed by anybody
- Human migration
- La Retirada, Spanish Civil War
- List of largest refugee crises
- List of people granted asylum
- List of refugees
- Mehran Karimi Nasseri, an Iranian refugee who lived in Charles de Gaulle Airport
- Nansen Refugee Award
- No person is illegal, network that represents non-resident immigrants
- Open borders
- Political asylum
- Private Sponsorship of Refugees Program - resettling refugees with the support and funding from private or joint government-private sponsorship
- Queer migration
- Refugee and Asylum Participatory Action Research
- Refugee crisis
- Refugee health
- Refugee Nation, a plan to create a nation for refugees
- Refugee Phrasebook
- Refugee Radio
- Refugee Studies Centre
- Refugee workers in Vichy France
- Right of asylum
- Refugee children and refugee women
- Third country resettlement
- Refugees as weapons
- Digital refugee
