= Asylum seeker =

Person applying for right of asylum

Asylum Seekers by Country of Origin
Total population
- 6,858,499 (2023)

Regions with significant populations
- Venezuela: 1,200,130
- Cuba: 329,692
- Nicaragua: 308,032
- Colombia: 301,824
- Afghanistan: 296,033
- Sudan: 253,902
- Haiti: 228,443
- Honduras: 216,873
- Iraq: 192,202
- Syria: 182,954
- Somalia: 179,224
- Guatemala: 176,035
- Mexico: 156,309
- Democratic Republic of the Congo: 153,142
- India: 142,607
- Ethiopia: 139,424
- China: 137,143
- El Salvador: 133,042
- Russia: 114,669
- Eritrea: 104,892
- Unknown: 95,550

Asylum seekers by country they live in per 100,000 people

Asylum Seekers by Country of Asylum
Total population
- 6,858,499 (2023)

Regions with significant populations
- US: 2,601,467
- Peru: 508,429
- Germany: 361,493
- Mexico: 257,396
- Egypt: 232,244
- Turkey: 222,069
- Spain: 204,270
- Canada: 197,961
- Costa Rica: 193,718
- Kenya: 152,942

An asylum seeker or asylum-seeker is a person who leaves their country of residence, enters another country, and makes in that other country a formal application for the right of asylum according to the Universal Declaration of Human Rights Article 14. A person keeps the status of asylum seeker until the right of asylum application has concluded.

The relevant immigration authorities of the country of asylum determine whether the asylum seeker will be granted the right of asylum protection or whether asylum will be refused and the asylum seeker becomes an illegal immigrant who may be asked to leave the country and may even be deported in line with non-refoulement. Signatories to the Universal Declaration of Human Rights create their own policies for assessing the protection status of asylum seekers, and the proportion of asylum applicants who are accepted or rejected varies each year from country to country.

The asylum seeker may be simultaneously recognized as a refugee and given refugee status if their circumstances fall into the definition of refugee according to the Convention relating to the Status of Refugees or regionally applicable refugee laws—such as the European Convention on Human Rights, if within the European Union.

The terms asylum seeker, refugee and illegal immigrant are often confused. In North American English, the term asylee is used both for an asylum seeker, as defined above, and a person whose right of asylum has been granted.

== Asylum and protection ==
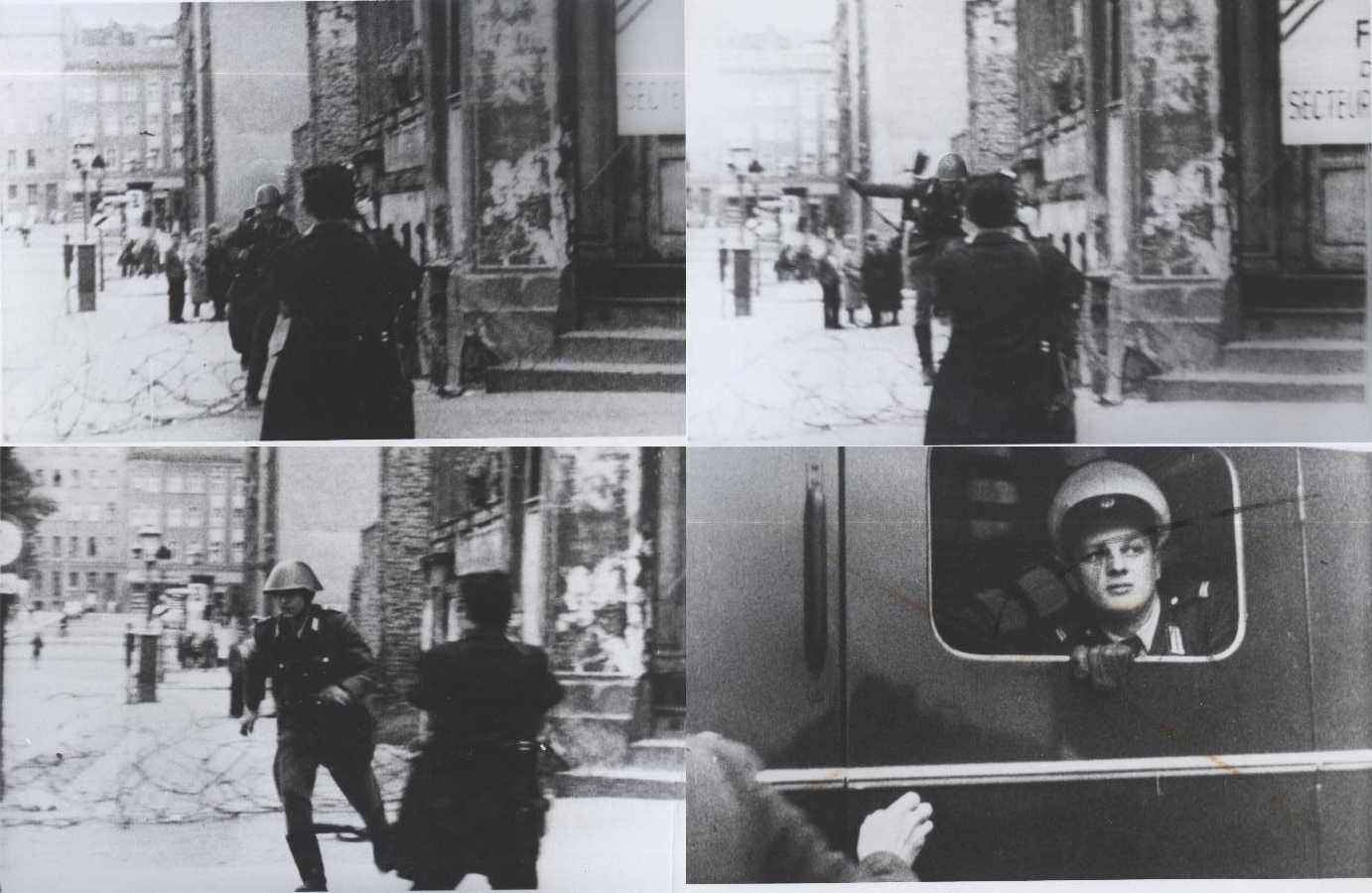
Konrad Schumann, an East German border guard, fleeing East Germany towards West Germany in 1962

The right of asylum according to the Article 14 of Universal Declaration of Human Rights:

1. Everyone has the right to seek and to enjoy in other countries asylum from persecution.

2. This right may not be invoked in the case of prosecutions genuinely arising from non-political crimes or from acts contrary to the purposes and principles of the United Nations.

— Universal Declaration of Human Rights, Article 14

Asylum seekers who have committed crimes against peace, a war crime or a crime against humanity, or other non-political crimes, or whose actions are contrary to the purposes and principles of the United Nations, are excluded from international protection. This asylum right is also included in 1951 Convention Relating to the Status of Refugees and 1967 Protocol Relating to the Status of Refugees. As of 1 July 2013, there were 145 parties to the 1951 Refugee Convention and 146 to the 1967 Protocol. These states are bound by an obligation under international law to grant asylum to people who fall within the definition of Convention and Protocol. Persons who do not fall within this definition may still be granted refugee according to the refugee definitions of 1951 Convention Relating to the Status of Refugees and the 1967 Protocol Relating to the Status of Refugees and persons who fall within this definition are called Convention refugees and their status is called Convention refugee status. Complementary forms of protection exist depending on country if the person falls within other refugee definitions.

The practical determination of whether a person obtains the right of asylum or not is most often left to certain government agencies within the host country. In some countries the refugee status determination (RSD) is done by the UNHCR. The burden of substantiating an asylum claim lies with the claimant, who must establish that they qualify for protection.

In many countries, country-of-origin information is used by migration officials as part of the assessment of asylum claims, and governments commission research into the accuracy of their country reports. Some countries have studied the rejection rates of their migration officials making decisions, finding that individuals reject more applicants than others assessing similar cases—and migration officials are required to standardise the reasons for accepting or rejecting claims, so that the decision of one adjudicator is consistent with what their colleagues decide. Nevertheless, researchers from a wide range of disciplines have continuously identified issues with how officials determine if they believe what a person claiming asylum tell about their past experiences, their identity, and relationships. This process - often referred to as the credibility assessment - has been found to be influenced by stereotypes, misconceptions about human memory and -behaviour, as well as institutional features.

=== Subsidiary protection status ===
Subsidiary protection is an international protection for persons seeking asylum who do not qualify as refugees. It is an option to get asylum for those who do not have a well-founded fear of persecution (which is required for refugee status according to the 1951 Convention), but do indeed have a substantial risk to be subjected to torture or to a serious harm if they are returned to their country of origin, for reasons that include war, violence, conflict and massive violations of human rights. The Universal Declaration of Human Rights and European Union law have a broader definition of who is entitled to asylum.

=== Temporary protection visa ===
Temporary protection visas are used to persons in Australia who applied for refugee status after making an unauthorised arrival. It is the main type of visa issued to refugees when released from Australian immigration detention facilities and they are required to reapply for it every three years.

== Statistics of asylum decisions ==
In the past 2 decades the number people applying for asylum every year varied between 0.6 and 2.8 million. Outcomes of asylum applications 2000-2023 according to UNHCR:

Year	Total	Asylum Granted	Other Protection	Rejected	Otherwise closed
2023	2,498,303	612,908	210,910	581,725	1,092,760
2022	2,057,838	535,551	181,210	584,481	756,596
2021	1,422,047	381,074	114,406	528,552	398,015
2020	1,381,088	350,791	108,794	542,999	379,044
2019	1,730,880	446,842	123,555	664,540	494,663
2018	1,647,261	351,123	148,849	633,046	514,242
2017	2,006,176	483,885	248,316	753,286	520,689
2016	2,844,805	564,859	335,016	604,795	1,340,135
2015	1,647,628	443,658	237,475	500,805	465,690
2014	1,393,642	277,959	336,783	429,690	349,210
2013	880,516	213,642	72,597	375,408	218,869
2012	913,275	210,828	50,902	436,913	204,849
2011	768,675	172,467	43,714	359,759	192,043
2010	730,596	174,983	47,676	355,271	152,667
2009	762,119	229,008	50,615	321,589	161,411
2008	706,269	156,297	63,889	325,688	154,869
2007	644,001	149,460	60,051	260,306	174,206
2006	692,537	141,358	50,711	306,655	193,757
2005	829,228	153,057	51,197	361,864	263,110
2004	891,175	128,182	51,212	445,057	266,665
2003	1,002,084	146,358	49,099	522,096	285,406
2002	1,010,251	161,926	62,105	524,552	261,728
2001	946,486	169,283	79,652	452,180	245,155
2000	1,090,296	203,350	93,392	543,111	249,475

The percentage of women among asylum seekers to Europe from 2008 to 2018 was 31%, which could be explained by factors including gender inequality in origin country and economic incentives.

== Status determination processes ==
=== Group determination ===
Asylum seekers may be given refugee status on a group basis. Refugees who went through the group status determination are also referred to as prima facie refugees. This is done in situations when the reasons for seeking refugee status are generally well known and individual assessment would otherwise overwhelm the capacities of assessors. Group determination is more readily done in states that not only have accepted the refugee definition of the 1951 Convention, but also use a refugee definition that includes people fleeing indiscriminate or generalized violence, which are not covered in the 1951 Convention.

=== Individual assessment ===
For persons who do not come into the country as part of a bigger group, individual asylum interviews are conducted to establish whether the person has sufficient reasons for seeking asylum. Meanwhile, high numbers of asylum seekers necessitate governments to provide machine learning systems to assist both asylum seekers and immigration officers in performing fair and just assessments.

=== Appeals ===
In many countries, asylum applicants can challenge a rejection by challenging the decision in a court or migration review panel. In the United Kingdom, more than one in four decisions to refuse an asylum seeker protection are overturned by immigration judges.

== Rights of asylum seekers ==
Whilst waiting for a decision asylum seekers have limited rights in the country of asylum. In most countries they are not allowed to work and in some countries not even to volunteer. In some countries they are not allowed to move freely within the country. Even access to health care is limited. In the European Union, those who have yet to be granted official status as refugees and are still within the asylum process have some restricted rights to healthcare access. This includes access to medical and psychological care. However, these may vary depending on the host country. For instance, under the Asylum Seekers Benefits Act (Asylbewerberleistungsgesetz) in Germany, asylum seekers are outside primary care and are limited to emergency health care, vaccinations, pregnancy and childbirth with limitations on specialty care. Asylum seekers have greater chance of experiencing unmet health needs as compared to the general German population. Asylum seekers also have greater odds of hospital admissions and at least one visit to a psychotherapist relative to the German general population.

== Concerns in asylum-seeking processes ==
Research suggests cross-sector collaboration is key to assist refugees and asylum seekers resettle and integrate into receiving communities, workplaces and schools.

Non-governmental organizations concerned with refugees and asylum seekers have pointed out difficulties for displaced persons to seek asylum in industrialized countries. As the immigration policy in many countries often focuses on the fight of illegal immigration and the strengthening of border controls, it deters displaced persons from entering territory in which they could lodge an asylum claim. The lack of opportunities to legally access the asylum procedures can force displaced persons to undertake often expensive and hazardous attempts at illegal entry.

In recent years, the public as well as policy makers of many countries are focusing more and more on refugees arriving through third country resettlement and pay less and less attention to asylum seekers and those who have already been granted refugee status but did not come through resettlement. Asylum seekers have even been referred to as 'queue jumpers', because they did not wait for their chance to be resettled.

Legal interpreters are assigned to assist asylum seekers throughout interviews and court proceedings. These legal interpreters reflect the training they received in the training program they were certified in. The accuracy of the legal interpretation may vary depending on the training received from the interpreter and potential biases they carry coming into the interpreting session. Lack of training in asylum settings may influence interpretation sessions.

Quality of life of asylum seekers and refugees is highly correlated with the mental health status. The presence of mental disorders like depression or PTSD is mainly due to the forced migration and the resettlement in host countries.

=== Destitution ===
Because asylum seekers often have to wait for months or years for the results of their asylum applications and because they are usually not allowed to work and only receive minimal or no financial support, destitution is a considerable risk.

Asylum seekers usually get some kind of support from governments whilst their application is processed. However, in some countries this support ends immediately once they are given refugee status. But the fact that they were given refugee status does not mean that they were already given all the documents they need for starting their new lives. Long waiting times significantly reduce the likelihood to obtain a job and the social integration of refugees.

=== Vacation ===
Asylum seekers vacationing in home country has been argued as a reason for refusal of asylum.

=== Identity ===
Absence of identity documents or disputes of identity can make the demonstration of persecution for the right of asylum more complex. Persons seeking protection based on "social identity" makers, such as religion or being LGBTQ+, are faced with the additional challenge of making their inner beliefs, sexual orientation, or gender identity seem credible to the official, in order to be entitled to protection.

== Refusal of asylum ==
It often happens that the country neither recognizes the refugee status of the asylum seekers nor sees them as legitimate migrants and thus treats them as illegal aliens. If an asylum claim has been rejected, the asylum seeker is said to be refused asylum and called a failed asylum seeker. Some failed asylum seekers return home voluntarily. Depending on the country, failed asylum seekers are allowed to remain temporarily or are forcibly returned in line with non-refoulement. The latter are most often placed in immigration detention before being deported.

== Asylum and refugee law by jurisdiction ==
Jurisdiction	Article	Past and present legislation/treaties	Related organizations and programs	Related events and people
African Union		Convention Governing the Specific Aspects of Refugee Problems in Africa; Kampala Convention	Africa Refugee Day	
Australia	Asylum in Australia		Asylum Seeker Resource Centre	
Albania				Uyghur asylum in Albania
Azerbaijan	Refugees in Azerbaijan			
Brazil			National Committee for Refugees (Comitê Nacional para os Refugiados, CONARE)	
Canada	Asylum in Canada	Immigration and Refugee Protection Act; Canada–United States Safe Third Country Agreement	Immigration, Refugees and Citizenship Canada; Immigration and Refugee Board of Canada	Hong Kong asylum seekers in Canada
China (incl. Hong Kong)	Refugees in Hong Kong		Justice Centre Hong Kong	Zouxian
Cuba				American fugitives in Cuba
Denmark			Center Sandholm; Danish Refugee Council	
Europe	Asylum in the European Union	Dublin Regulation; European Social Charter; Reception Conditions Directive, 2003; Policy Plan on Asylum, 2008; European Pact on Immigration and Asylum, 2008; Asylum Procedures Directive, 2013	European Asylum Support Office; European Asylum Curriculum; Asylum, Migration and Integration Fund; Eurodac; European Council on Refugees and Exiles; European Database on Asylum Law	European refugee crisis
Finland			Finnish Refugee Council	Immigration to Finland
France	Asylum in France	Code of Entry and Residence of Foreigners and of the Right to Asylum; Law on immigration and integration, 2006; Law on the control of immigration, integration and asylum, 2007	France terre d'asile; Office français de protection des réfugiés et apatrides (OFPRA; Office for the Protection of Refugees and Stateless Persons)	
Germany	Asylum in Germany		Albert Einstein German Academic Refugee Initiative Fund (offered by UNHCR); Pro Asyl	
Greece			METAdrasi; Hellenic Rescue Team	2016 Turkish military asylum incident in Greece
India	Refugees in India		Migration and Asylum Project; UNHCR Representation in India	
Ireland			Doras; Irish Refugee Council; Movement of Asylum Seekers in Ireland; Nasc; Sanctuary Runners	Bulelani Mfaco; Lucky Khambule
Israel	Israeli policy for non-Jewish African refugees			Usumain Baraka; Eduard Stavytsky; Payam Feili
Latin America		Cartagena Declaration on Refugees (Note: Adopted by Belize, Colombia, Costa Rica, El Salvador, Guatemala, Honduras, Mexico, Nicaragua, Panama, and Venezuela)		
Middle East			UN Relief and Works Agency for Palestine Refugees; Association Najdeh	
New Zealand	Refugees in New Zealand		Refugee Status Appeals Authority	
Norway	Refugees in Norway		Norwegian Refugee Council	Rafał Gaweł
Pakistan	Refugees in Pakistan			
Russia(incl. Soviet Union)	Refugees and asylum in Russia			Edward Lee Howard
South Korea	Refugees in South Korea			Refugees on Jeju Island
Switzerland			Be aware and share; UniRef	
UK	Asylum in the UK	Polish Resettlement Act, 1947; Nationality, Immigration and Asylum Act, 2002; Asylum and Immigration (Treatment of Claimants, etc.) Act, 2004; UK Borders Act, 2007	Asylum and Immigration Tribunal; Asylum Support Partnership; Refugee Council; Scottish Refugee Council; Unity; Welsh Refugee Council	Jews escaping to the United Kingdom
UN (incl. League of Nations)		Convention Relating to the Status of Refugees, 1951; Protocol Relating to the Status of Refugees, 1967	Organizations: UN High Commissioner for Refugees (UNHCR); International Refugee Organization; UNHCR Goodwill Ambassador; International Organization for Migration; UN Office for the Coordination of Humanitarian Affairs; Nansen International Office for Refugees; Documentation: Humanitarian visa; Refugee identity certificate; Refugee travel document; Campaigns/initiatives: World Refugee Day; Nansen Refugee Award	
US	Asylum in the United States	Immigration and Nationality Act, 1952; Migration and Refugee Assistance Act, 1962; Immigration and Nationality Act, 1965; United States Refugee Act, 1980; Immigration Act, 1990; Canada–United States Safe Third Country Agreement	Immigration and Naturalization Service; U.S. Citizenship and Immigration Services (USCIS)	Operation Provide Comfort

== See also ==
- Church asylum
- Dispersal Act, Netherlands asylum legislation
- Impediment to expulsion
- Internally displaced person
- Forced displacement in popular culture
- Integration of immigrants
- Refugee employment
- Refugee identity certificate
- Refugee roulette
- Sanctuary city
- Statelessness
- Transgender asylum seekers

=== Related organizations ===
- Organization for Refugees Asylum and Migration
- Amnesty International
- International Committee of the Red Cross
- International Cities of Refuge Network
- United Nations High Commissioner for Refugees
