= Payam =

Payam may refer to:

== Given name ==
- Payam Akhavan, Iranian-born international lawyer, working criminal tribunals
- Payam Bouyeri (born 1994), Iranian wrestler
- Payam Dehkordi (born 1977), Iranian actor
- Payam Feili (born 1985), Iranian poet, activist and writer
- Payam Ghobadi (born 1989), Iranian-born Azerbaijani taekwondo practitioner
- Payam Malekian (born 1996), Iranian footballer
- Payam Niazmand (born 1995), Iranian footballer
- Payam Sadeghian (born 1992), Iranian footballer
- Payam Salehi (born 1975), Iranian singer and guitarist

== Places ==
- Payam (administrative division), a political subdivision of counties in South Sudan, East Africa
- Payam, Kerala, a village and panchayat in Kerala state, India
- Payam, Iran, a village in East Azerbaijan province, Iran

== Other ==
- Payam Air, a cargo airline based in Tehran, Iran
- Payame Noor University, a series of Iranian universities
- Payam International Airport, an international airport located in Karaj, Iran
- Payam Khorasan F.C., also known as Payam Mashhad, an Iranian football (soccer) club
- IRIB Radio Payam, a radio station in Iran
