= Refugee identity certificate =

A refugee identity certificate is a document that refugees use as proof of identity. It is either issued by the UNHCR or by the State of asylum. In many countries refugees are obliged to carry their refugee card with them at all times. In some refugee camps, the WFP food ration card is also used as a form of ID.

States that have signed the 1951 Refugee Convention have to provide refugees access to identification certificates, which can be either a refugee travel document, according to Article 28 of the convention, or another form of identity documents, according to Article 27.

== Germany ==
Since 28 January 2016 refugees in the Federal Republic of Germany have received a proof of arrival. If they have filed an asylum application, they also receive residence authorisation. If they are recognised as entitled to asylum they will be granted refugee status and will receive a travel document for refugees and a residence title.

=== After World War II ===
After the Second World War, millions of Germans were expelled from their homeland. The survivors took refuge in what is known today as the Federal Republic of Germany (which at that time was divided into four occupation zones) or in other countries.

The Federal Republic of Germany and the GDR were founded in 1949, but their sovereignty was still limited for a long time (see legal status of Germany after 1945).

In the Federal Republic of Germany a passport for displaced persons and refugees was created and the respective status of each individual documented in an admission procedure on arrival. These were issued in Friedland Refugee Camp; for Soviet zone refugees who came via West Berlin, in a camp in Berlin-Marienfelde.

Not all applicants from the Soviet occupation zone were recognised as refugees, but they were tolerated in the West. The refugee identity card confirmed their "recognition as a refugee" and provided access to various forms of help for these individuals (for example, the right to move, including entitlement to a rented flat; subsistence allowance which might include compensation for the Equalisation of Burdens Law and loans granted under the act for the purchase of property).

Identifying the status of a person, who may be displaced from their home country (Heimatvertriebene) or a refugee from the Soviet occupation zone, was carried out according to the Federal Expellee Law of 1953. Identity cards A and B were for displaced persons and refugees of the former eastern territories of Germany. Refugees of the Soviet occupation zone (Sowjetzone) received identity card C.

Identity card A was for individuals who had already been living in the German Eastern territories before 1938, B for those who had just moved there in 1938. In addition, municipalities in Lower Saxony also issued identity card B to inhabitants who had moved there after the bombings.

Identity card for displaced persons and refugees, groups A, B and C

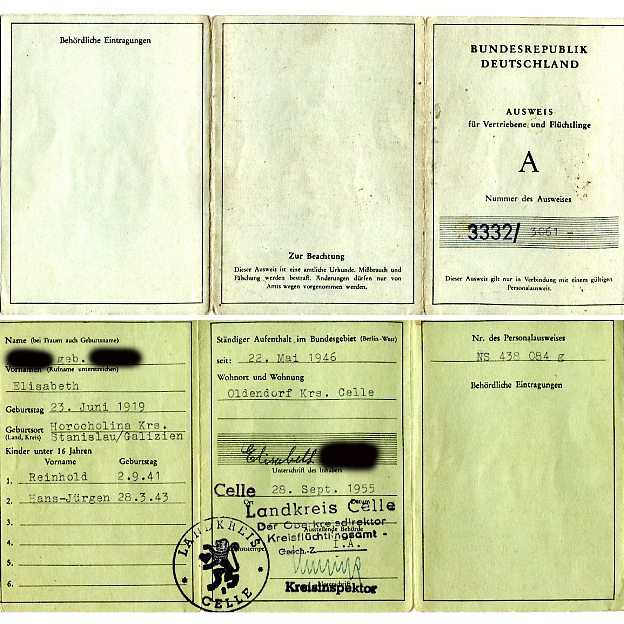
Refugee identity card A

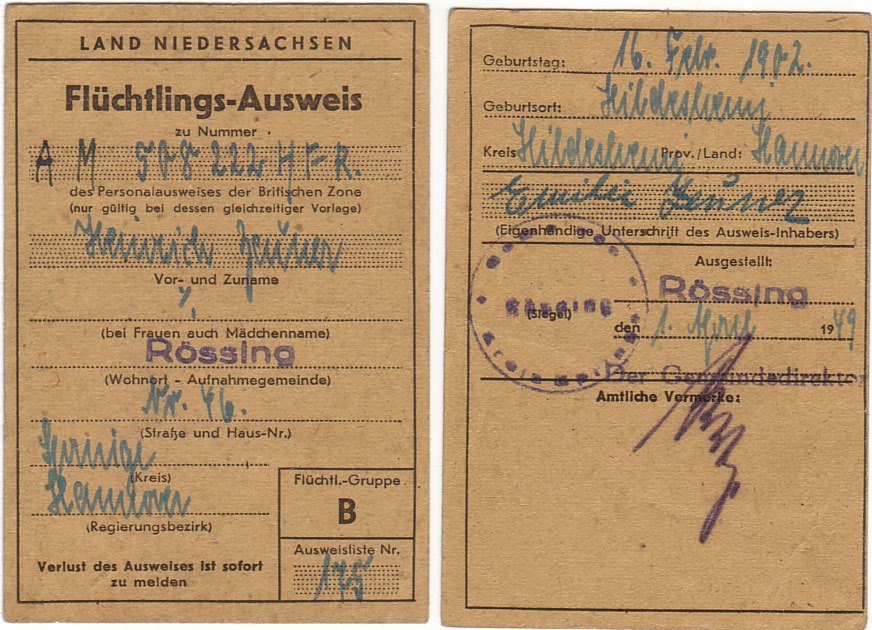
Refugee identity card B

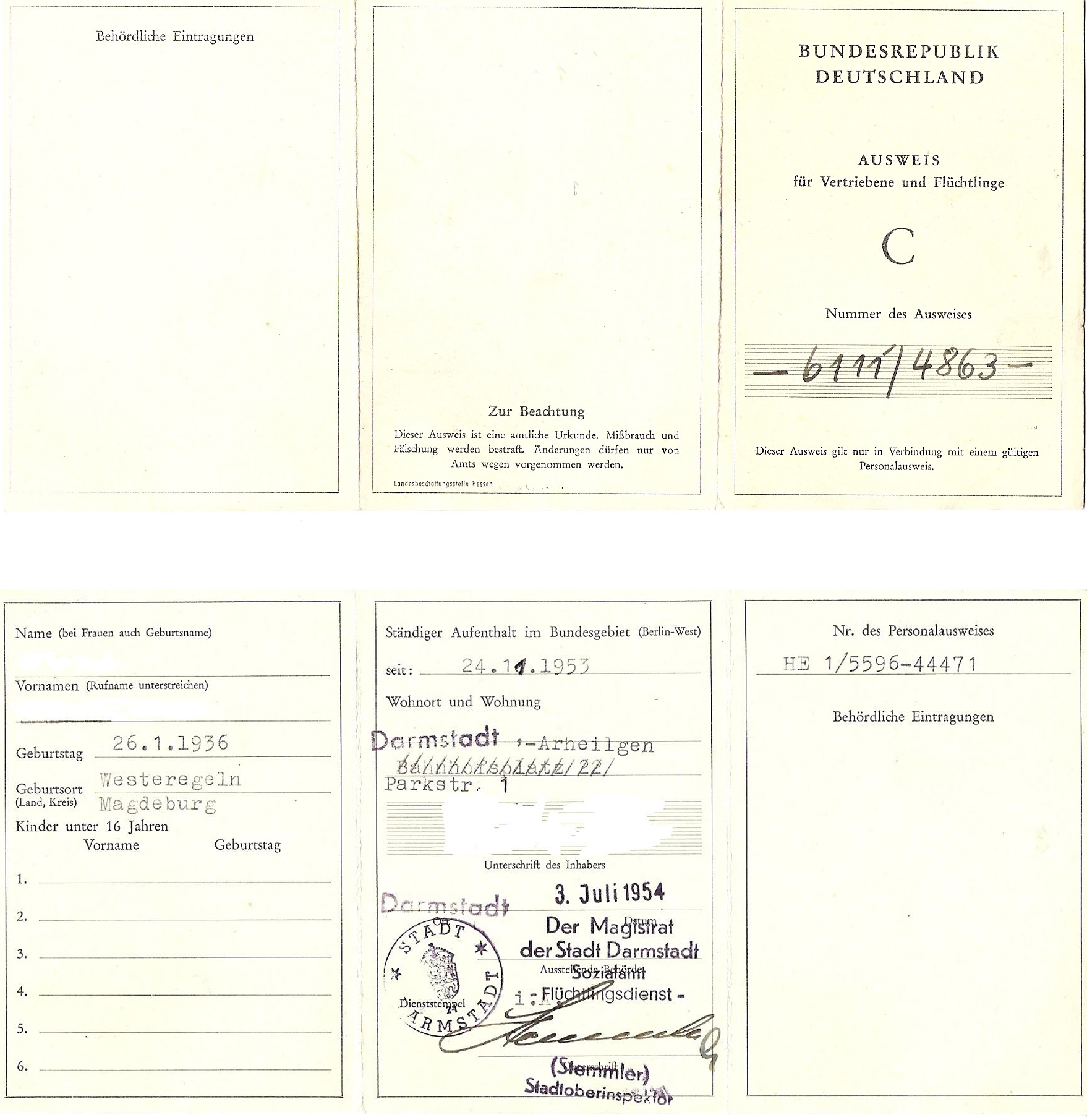
Refugee identity card C

== See also ==
- Asylum seekers
- Refugees
- Refugee employment
- Refugee crisis
