= 1188 (disambiguation) =

1188 is a year. 1188 may also refer to:

- 1188 AM, an AM radio frequency
- 1188 Gothlandia, an asteroid
- Kosmos 1188, a satellite
- Louisiana Highway 1188
- Farm to Market Road 1188, a road in Texas
