= Public interest law in Hong Kong =

Public interest law in Hong Kong is an emerging field. The chief vehicle for pursuing public interest claims is judicial review. This is the process by which decisions of the government are challenged in the courts. There has been a surge in judicial review cases since 2000. Environmental issues and minority rights are among the most litigated areas.

== Origin of Public interest law in Hong Kong ==
One of the pioneers in public interest law in Hong Kong was Pamela Baker. In the late 1980s she litigated a series of landmark courtroom cases challenging the government's treatment of Vietnamese refugees. Later a small group of lawyers followed in her footsteps, safeguarding and strengthening human rights protection in the city. In 1995 the Hong Kong Human Rights Monitor was established with the aim of promoting better human rights protection in Hong Kong. Today, the majority of cause lawyers who represent citizens and social groups in human rights and public policy litigation on a consistent basis in Hong Kong are also members of political parties or active participants in social movements outside the courts. They practise in different settings: some are members of large barristers' chambers, while some practise in small law firms.

== Legal Aid Schemes ==
In Hong Kong, the Legal Aid Department provides funding to legal services for those who pass the means and merits test. The two Legal Aid Schemes that it operates, namely the Ordinary Legal Aid Scheme (OLAS) and the Supplementary Legal Aid Scheme (SLAS) have facilitated the practice of public interest law through narrowing the resource inequality between economically disadvantaged litigants and the government. However, NGOs and charities are ineligible to legal aid. This has prompted cases in which these NGOs and charities invited persons who lacked particular interests in the litigation but qualified for legal aid to stand as the applicant. In his article, an academic has challenged decisions of the Hong Kong courts that allowed those lacking sufficient standing (locus standi) to be the applicants in public interest lawsuits involving either generalised or specific grievances.

== Duty Lawyer Schemes ==
Apart from legal aid, the Hong Kong Bar Association and The Law Society of Hong Kong jointly provides the Duty Lawyer Scheme which offers free legal representation to eligible defendants on the first day of court appearance. They also run the Free Legal Advice Scheme at their Legal Advice Centres within nine District Offices in Hong Kong with the aim to provide one-off preliminary legal advice to the general public without imposing any means test. However, eight out of nine Centres at the District Offices only operate once a week in the evening, with five consultation sessions lasting about 20–30 minutes each. Applicants generally wait eight weeks for a consultation. The Scheme does not offer any follow-up service or representation to the applicants, meaning they must seek further advice elsewhere after obtaining some general advice from the duty lawyers.

== Free legal services ==
Apart from the above schemes, The Hong Kong Bar Association and The Law Society of Hong Kong operate their own Bar Free Legal Service Scheme and Free Legal Consultation Scheme respectively, where enrolled law firms and barristers specializing in different fields volunteer to give consultations on a pro bono basis. In the former scheme, each barrister volunteers up to three days or twenty hours per year in a case. While it is generally sufficient for most types of advisory work and representation in courts and tribunals for short cases or hearing, the barrister is unable to advise on a continuing basis over a long period or provide assistance in long or complex cases in courts. In the latter scheme, successful applicants are entitled up to 45 minutes of free initial consultation. The areas provided by participant law firms are diverse, such as wills and probate, administrative law, banking and finance and intellectual property law. There are currently more than 100 participating law firms in Hong Kong.

For obtaining free legal advice, people who require this service can get help from the Government departments such as the Home Affairs Department, but have to wait for months to obtain legal advice. However, there are some private practising lawyers in Hong Kong who are willing to provide free legal advice to the public. The advantage of it is that people who require legal advice can get help immediately, and hence their legal rights and interests can be protected without delay.

== Comparison with other jurisdictions ==
Unlike some other common law jurisdictions such as the United Kingdom and Australia, neither contingency nor conditional fee arrangement is allowed in Hong Kong under The Hong Kong Solicitors' Guide to Professional Conduct, the Code of Conduct of the Bar, and Legal Practitioners Ordinance. The Bar Association of Hong Kong maintains that the status quo is necessary as it reduces the likelihood of lawyers engaging in unprofessional conduct in order to ensure victory in litigation, or quickly settling a case even when the terms are not most favourable to their clients. The former Director of Public Prosecutions (now a judge of the Hong Kong Court of First Instance), Kevin Zervos, also commented that Hong Kong should not blindly follow the other jurisdictions without considering whether lifting the prohibition suits Hong Kong's local conditions and circumstances. On the other hand, it is believed that one disadvantage of banning contingency fees is that economically disadvantaged litigants are discouraged from pursuing otherwise meritorious claims because in case they lose they are still required to finance their litigation. They must be careful in weighing their chances of success against their resources before bringing a public interest lawsuit to court. For example, in a typical judicial review application, even if a public interest party succeeds, it is still required to bear around one-third of their legal costs on a party to party basis, which is the normal costs order under such circumstances. Therefore, it has been argued that the wider usage and recognition of a Protective Costs Order (PCO) will fill the gap in legal aid. Under a PCO, either the losing party is not liable for the opponent's legal costs or its liability is capped at a certain amount. Hong Kong Courts' jurisdiction to grant PCOs was recognised in Chan Wai Yip Albert v Secretary for Justice but scholars caution that the development must be cautious lest it be open to abuse. A consultation paper was published in 2005 by the Law Reform Commission of Hong Kong Conditional Fees Sub-committee to evaluate the pros and cons of conditional fees arrangement but it was rejected by the Law Reform Commission in 2007 primarily due to the lack of support from the insurance industry.

In addition, unlike in the United States where NGOs and public interest law groups routinely bring public interest lawsuits on behalf of aggrieved individuals, in-house counsel working in NGOs and charities in Hong Kong are not allowed to directly represent the people these organizations serve. Some commentators believe that the inability of NGOs to directly represent clients in legal proceedings has dampened the growth of public interest law in Hong Kong.

== Public interest law education in Hong Kong ==
Law schools in Hong Kong also organise various programmes to promote the idea of pro bono legal service to students. In January 2009, the University of Hong Kong ("HKU") launched its first clinical education scheme in conjunction with the Hong Kong Refugee Advice Centre ("HKRAC"), which has been renamed Justice Centre Hong Kong in March 2014. Students are given the opportunity to learn and practice domestic and international refugee law directly under the supervision of Justice Centre staff. The Chinese University of Hong Kong also runs a similar programme with the Justice Centre Hong Kong. In January 2010, HKU pioneered the Free Legal Advice Scheme on campus under the Duty Lawyer Scheme. Concurrently, it introduced the Clinical Legal Education Course (General Stream, as distinct from the Refugee Stream), where enrolled students are supervised by faculty members to attend interviews, conduct research and help prepare legal advice to the general public on areas other than refugee law. The Centre of Comparative and Public Law at HKU plays a pivotal role in promoting public interest law in Hong Kong. It was established in 1995 as a non-profit virtual research centre within the Faculty of Law at HKU. Over the years, it has organised a large number of conferences, seminars and rights talks in areas ranging from political reform to LGBT rights. It administers the Human Rights Portal, a compendium of information, and in January 2014 it hosted Hong Kong's First Annual Public Interest Law Conference to encourage and support the growth of public interest law in the city.

== Pro bono services ==
Pro bono committees of law firms in Hong Kong also meet on a bimonthly basis in the Hong Kong Legal Community Roundtable, a forum for international law firms to discuss development of pro bono work in Hong Kong and the region. Initially chartered in 2008, the Roundtable comprises attorneys from more than 30 international law firms with operations in the city. These Roundtable meetings have included briefings by a number of local NGOs about their activities and legal needs.
