= United Nations Security Council Resolution 319 =

UN Security Council Resolution 319
- Date: 1 August 1972
- Meeting no.: 1,657
- Code: S/RES/319 (Document)
- Subject: The situation in Namibia
- Voting summary: 14 voted for; None voted against; None abstained
- Result: Adopted

Security Council composition
- Permanent members: China; France; Soviet Union; United Kingdom; United States
- Non-permanent members: Argentina; Belgium; Guinea; India; Italy; Japan; Panama; Somalia; Sudan; Yugoslavia

United Nations Security Council Resolution 319, adopted on August 1, 1972, after reaffirming previous resolutions on the topic, the Council invited the Secretary-General, in consultation with the group established in resolution 309, to continue to contact all concerned parties and establish the necessary conditions to allow the people to exercise their right to self-determination in accordance with the Charter. The Council then requested that Secretary-General keep them informed on the implementation of resolution 309.

Resolution 319 was adopted unanimously with 14 votes; the People's Republic of China did not participate in voting.

== See also ==
- List of United Nations Security Council Resolutions 301 to 400 (1971–1976)
- South West Africa
