= 1188 AM =

AM radio frequency

The following radio stations broadcast on AM frequency 1188 kHz:

== Bangladesh ==
- Transfer CRI CGTN Radio in Dhaka (during 18:00-19:00 and 21:00-22:00)

== India ==
- Transfer CRI CGTN Radio in Delhi (during 17:30-18:30 and 20:30-21:30) and Kathmantu (during 17:45-18:45)

== South Korea ==
- FEBC Radio in Jeju

== Iran ==
- Radio Payam in Tehran.

== Italy ==
- "Radio Studio X" at Pistoia, Tuscany (transmits AM stereo)

== Philippines ==
- DZLT-AM in Lucena, Quezon
- DZXO in Cabanatuan, Nueva Ecija
- DXRU in Cagayan de Oro

== Sri Lanka ==
- Transfer CRI CGTN Radio in Colombo (during 20:30-21:30)
