= Margins to Access Project =

Refugee legal aid centre based in New Delhi, India

The Margins to Access Project (MAP), formerly known as Migration and Asylum Project and Ara Legal Initiative, is a refugee legal aid centre based in New Delhi, India. It provides legal aid and counselling to asylum seekers and refugees in India.

== History ==
M.A.P was started as The Ara Trust’s pilot programme on 20 February 2013. It was set up primarily to introduce the concept of legal representation in UNHCR’s asylum process and to ensure that every refugee in India was able to realise their right to legal assistance. The idea was to make the system more transparent and accountable and thereby bring them in line with India’s democratic ethos.

The initiative was conceived by Roshni Shanker, the organisation’s founder, when she was working as a lawyer with UNHCR’s field offices, assessing asylum claims from conflict-affected countries. It was during this time that she came across some of the most inspiring stories of human spirit and endurance in the face of insurmountable hurdles. She gained intimate knowledge of what it was to rebuild one’s life in an alien land without knowing the local language and not being able to fall back on familiar support systems.

Roshni also realised that traditional humanitarian interventions often fail to recognise legal assistance as being fundamental to refugees’ post-conflict recovery and rehabilitation. In addition, given that the overwhelming majority of refugees are women and girls, who are disproportionately affected by conflict and remain highly vulnerable even in the country of asylum, she identified the need for specially tailored assistance for this population. She however understood that these gaps can be better addressed at grassroots level by organisations familiar with the local context. Since India had no such independent organisation at the time, Roshni decided to leave the UN and returned to start M.A.P.

Today, M.A.P is one of the foremost advocates for refugees in the region and uses the law as an effective tool to expand the legal protection space for this group. It continues to evolve as an organisation constantly innovating to address the growing needs of this population in light of the local and international context. For example, in the background of India’s move towards an inclusive economic order, M.A.P is the first organisation to run an initiative to assimilate refugees within this new financial landscape.

== Programmes and Initiatives ==
=== Legal Empowerment ===
India is not a party to the Convention Relating to the Status of Refugees. However, UNHCR in India conducts Refugee Status Determination (RSD) procedures, which starts with registration of individual asylum-seekers. Following registration, UNHCR conducts interviews with each individual asylum-seeker to assess his/her claim to international protection as a refugee.

In 2013, M.A.P entered into a Memorandum of Understanding (MoU) with UNHCR India to provide legal aid to asylum seekers for RSD interviews, and requiring UNHCR to provide a detailed rejected letter for all cases. M.A.P. is an intermediary between refugees and UNHCR and has been offering legal assistance and representation to asylum seekers from countries including Afghanistan, Somalia, and Sudan since 2013.

In 2016, this model was recognised as a best practice for replication by other countries in the region by the UNHCR Headquarters.

=== Research and Policy ===
In September 2015, M.A.P published a report on "Refugee Protection in India: Access to Economic and Social Rights", which was fully funded by UNHCR India. In 2015, M.A.P assisted a sitting Member of Parliament, Shashi Tharoor with the drafting of a domestic asylum law, which was introduced in the Indian Parliament as a private members Bill. Members from the legal team of the organisation also contribute regularly to editorials on contemporary changes relating to refugees in India.

=== Advocacy and Outreach ===
In January 2019, M.A.P. organised an exhibition titled "Passage to Asylum". Through a series of rooms, the exhibition depicted various stages of a refugee's life starting from their home to the asylum process they undergo in a different country. In July 2018, the organisation launched a livelihood initiative Atiqa in association with Dastkar for Afghani refugee women in India, who are using their skills in traditional embroidery.
