= Refugees in Hong Kong =

Refugees in Hong Kong have formed historic waves arriving in the city due to wars in the region and Hong Kong's historical role as a trading and transit entrepôt. More recently those seeking asylum have increased in number since 2004 due to changes in the legal system for considering asylum claims mandated by local courts.

The substantiation rate for claims remains very low at approximately 1.13%. The government maintains that most claimants are economic migrants abusing the system, with many filing claims only after arrest for illegal work or when facing deportation.

== History ==
=== From Maoist China ===
The largest refugee movement into Hong Kong occurred during the Maoist era in mainland China. The end of the Chinese Civil War in 1949, followed by political campaigns, famine and social upheaval under the Chinese Communist government, drove hundreds of thousands of people to flee to British Hong Kong. Between 1945 and 1951, Hong Kong's population increased from approximately 600,000 to 2.1 million, meaning a large proportion of the city's population are descended from refugees. From 1950 through 1963 alone, approximately 1,160,000 refugees entered Hong Kong from mainland China.

=== From Russia ===
Among those arriving in Hong Kong during the 1950s and 1960s were thousands of Russian refugees who had previously settled in mainland China. These were largely White Russians who fled the Soviet Union after the Russian Revolution and established communities in Manchuria and Sinkiang. After the Communist victory in China in 1949, many fled again to Hong Kong.

Many remained stranded in Hong Kong for years awaiting resettlement overseas. Refugees were housed in hotels and supported financially by the UNHCR and the World Council of Churches. Over time, many were resettled in countries including the United States, Brazil, Argentina, Australia and New Zealand. By 1980, an estimated 20,000 White Russians from mainland China had passed through Hong Kong on their way to permanent resettlement abroad.

=== From Vietnam ===
A new refugee wave emerged after the end of the Vietnam War in 1975, when large numbers of Vietnamese fled the country by sea. Hong Kong became one of the main destinations for these so-called "boat people" in Southeast Asia.

Over the following decades, Hong Kong housed tens of thousands of Vietnamese refugees and migrants in detention centres and camps while international resettlement arrangements were negotiated. Ultimately, about 143,700 Vietnamese refugees were resettled in third countries, while approximately 67,000 Vietnamese migrants were repatriated to Vietnam. Only around 1,000 Vietnamese refugees were granted permission to settle permanently in Hong Kong.

=== Development of the non-refoulement system ===
Hong Kong historically maintained a policy of not granting asylum or refugee status, even as it processed claims relating to torture or persecution. However, beginning in the 2000s, a series of court rulings significantly reshaped the territory's handling of non-refoulement claims.

Since 2004, Hong Kong courts have prohibited the removal of illegal immigrants while claims of torture or persecution remained under review. This led to a substantial increase in asylum seeker and torture claimant applications.

A landmark 2013 ruling by the Court of Final Appeal held that refugee determinations were subject to judicial review. In response, the government introduced the Unified Screening Mechanism in 2014, consolidating all non-refoulement claims, including torture and persecution claims, into a single system administered by the Immigration Department.

Under the Unified Screening Mechanism, the UNHCR ceased separately screening asylum claims in Hong Kong, with all claims instead processed by local authorities. Claims rejected by the Immigration Department may be appealed through the courts. Unlike in many other jurisdictions, successful claimants in Hong Kong are not granted permanent residence or refugee status, but are protected only from removal under the principle of non-refoulement.

The introduction of the Unified Screening Mechanism contributed to another sharp rise in claims. Between 2014 and 2015, applications increased by approximately 70% as torture and persecution claims were consolidated into a single process.

=== Government response and contemporary policy ===
By the late 2010s and early 2020s, officials increasingly argued that many claimants were abusing the non-refoulement system to prolong their stay in Hong Kong through lengthy legal procedures rather than seeking genuine protection. Government officials frequently described a large proportion of claimants as economic migrants exploiting Hong Kong's liberal visa regime and judicial system. From late 2009 through June 2025, the substantiation rate for non-refoulement claims was 1.13%, with the Immigration Department substantiating only 366 claims out of 32,421 determined cases.

In 2021, the Immigration (Amendment) Ordinance 2021 increased penalties for illegal employment and strengthened immigration enforcement powers. Authorities stated that tougher measures were necessary because many rejected claimants had remained in Hong Kong for years while working illegally or filing repeated appeals. In 2023, hundreds of non-refoulement claimants were arrested for unlawful employment.

In January 2026, the Immigration Department conducted a week-long deportation operation codenamed "Shield", during which 113 rejected non-refoulement claimants were repatriated. The group included 68 men and 45 women, mainly from Vietnam, Indonesia and India, including some who had completed prison sentences in Hong Kong for criminal offences.

== Demographics ==
As of June 2025, there were approximately 15,000 asylum seekers in Hong Kong at various stages of processing, though the pending initial determination backlog had been reduced from about 14,000 in 2017 to just 747.

At the end of 2024, the five largest nationality groups among non-refoulement claimants by accumulated number of individuals since 2014 were Vietnamese (6,083), Indonesians (4,467), Indians (3,900), Pakistanis (2,964), and Bangladeshis (2,265).

The number of Indian claimants declined sharply following the introduction of mandatory electronic pre-arrival registration for Indian nationals on January 23, 2017, which significantly reduced spontaneous arrivals and overstaying.

== Cost and assistance ==
Government expenditure related to asylum seekers has risen substantially in the 2010s and 2020s. By the 2023–24 fiscal year, total spending was estimated at around HK$1.4 billion. The government provides a monthly rental subsidy of HK$1,500 per adult, food assistance in the form of food vouchers, and access to emergency medical care. Asylum seekers are not permitted to work while their claims are under assessment, and the level of assistance has often been criticised as insufficient given Hong Kong’s high cost of living.

== Crime ==
Asylum seekers have been a source of public concern over street crime in Hong Kong, with sections of the press and political establishment associating the refugee population with criminal activity. However, published crime statistics do not break down offences by refugee status, making it difficult to establish whether asylum seekers are disproportionately represented in crime statistics. Refugee advocacy organisation Vision First attributes criminal activity among asylum seekers to what it calls "Hong Kong’s botched asylum system", arguing that inadequate welfare assistance and the prohibition on employment leave asylum seekers with few legitimate means of supporting themselves.

An asylum seeker from India raped a 22-year-old woman from mainland China in June 2013, sparking alarm in Hong Kong and subjecting the handling of asylum seekers by the city government to widespread public scrutiny. Azad Mohammad Farhan, then 26, was living in Rhine Guesthouse, a hostel in Chungking Mansions, where the victim was also staying as a tourist. According to the sentencing judgment, Farhan entered the woman's room while she was alone, threatened to cut her throat while gesturing towards his trouser pocket to suggest he had a weapon, and sexually assaulted and raped her. The court noted that Farhan had five previous convictions, including rape, non-consensual buggery and robbery, for which he had received an 18-year prison sentence in a separate case. The court described the threat made during the 2013 rape as a serious aggravating factor. Farhan's aggregate sentence for the two cases was 21 years and four months' imprisonment. The sentencing judgment also recorded that Farhan had two brothers who were businessmen in Hong Kong, while his parents and two sisters lived in India. His defence told the court that he had come to Hong Kong in 2008 after becoming involved in politics in India and receiving death threats, and that he intended to return to his family after serving his sentence.

Over the course of 2015, a series of arrests of 84 suspects busted a major drug ring operating in Hong Kong. Most of the suspects were described as mostly "African men, mainly from Gambia" who had sought asylum.
