= United Nations High Commissioner for Refugees =

UN agency to protect and support refugees

Office of the United Nations High Commissioner for Refugees
- Abbreviation: UNHCR, HCR
- Formation: 14 December 1950; 75 years ago
- Type: United Nations Programme
- Legal status: Nonprofit
- Headquarters: Geneva, Switzerland
- Head: Barham Salih (High Commissioner for Refugees)
- Parent organization: United Nations General Assembly; United Nations Economic and Social Council
- Staff: 20,305 (2023)
- Website: unhcr.org

The Office of the United Nations High Commissioner for Refugees (UNHCR) is a United Nations agency mandated to aid and protect refugees, forcibly displaced communities, and stateless people, and to assist in their voluntary repatriation, local integration or resettlement to a third country. It is headquartered in Geneva, Switzerland, and has 20,305 staff working in 136 countries as of December 2023.

== Background ==
The League of Nations, founded in January 1920, was the first worldwide intergovernmental organisation whose principal mission was to maintain world peace. The following year it established the Office of the High Commissioner for Refugees, appointing Norwegian scientist Fridtjof Nansen as the first to hold the post.

After Nansen's death in 1930, the Nansen International Office for Refugees continued his work. This Office was replaced in 1938 by the appointment of a High Commissioner for Refugees. As refugees fled Nazi Germany, the League of Nations appointed James McDonald as High Commissioner for Refugees Coming from Germany. Facing strict global immigration limits, he helped resettle more than 80,000 refugees, mainly to Palestine. In 1935, McDonald resigned in protest at the League's failure to act against the persecution of Jews under the Nuremberg Laws, which stripped them of citizenship and basic rights. His office was replaced in 1938 by a new High Commissioner for Refugees. Its role was very limited and ended in 1946.

== History ==
=== After the second world war: Europe ===
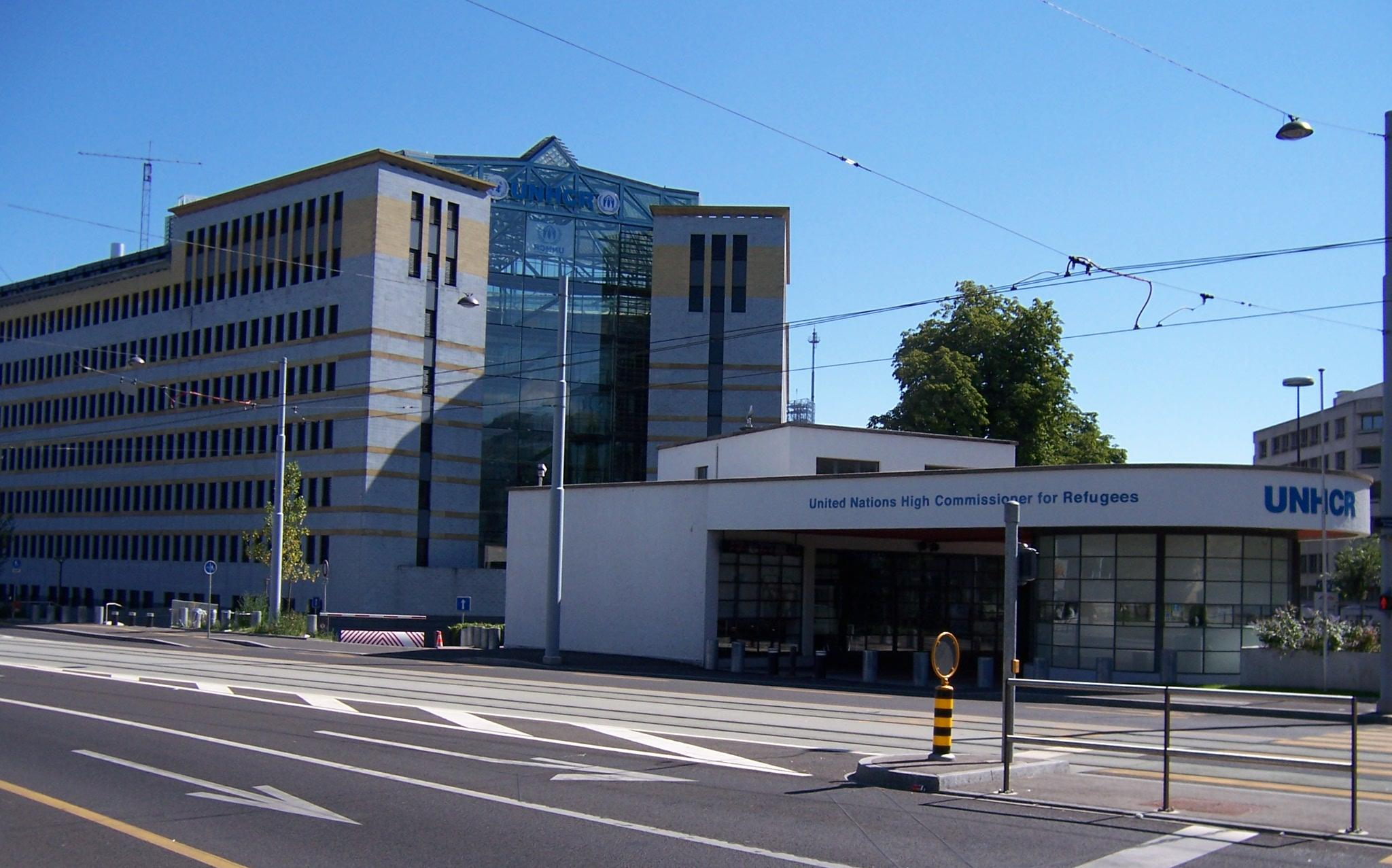
Office of the United Nations High Commissioner for Refugees, near the Palace of Nations in Geneva, Switzerland

After the dissolution of the League of Nations and the creation of the United Nations, the international community faced an acute refugee crisis in the aftermath of World War II. To address this, the Allies established the United Nations Relief and Rehabilitation Administration (UNRRA) in 1944, tasked with supporting millions of displaced people across Europe. In 1946, this work was expanded through the creation of the International Refugee Organization (IRO), the first international agency to comprehensively address all aspects of refugees' lives.

In the late 1940s, the IRO fell out of favour, but the UN agreed that a body was required to oversee global refugee issues. After a series of extensive debates in the United Nations General Assembly, the Office of the United Nations High Commissioner for Refugees was established in December 1949 by Resolution 319 (IV) as a subsidiary organ of the Assembly. However, the organisation was only intended to operate for 3 years from January 1951, due to the disagreement of many UN member states over the implications of a permanent body.

UNHCR's mandate was originally set out in its statute, annexed to Resolution 428(V) of the General Assembly of 1950. According to UNHCR, its mandate is to provide, on a non-political and humanitarian basis, international protection to refugees and to seek permanent solutions for them. This mandate has been subsequently broadened by numerous resolutions of the General Assembly and its Economic and Social Council (ECOSOC). People who were already receiving assistance from other organs of the United Nations, such as UNKRA and UNRWA, were excluded from UNHCR's mandate.

In addition to establishing UNHCR, governments also adopted the 1951 Convention relating to the Status of Refugees, that defines who is a refugee and standards for the treatment for those fulfilling this definition. To this day, the Convention remains the foundation of international refugee law and established the legal framework and scope of UNHCR's work, which initially focused on Europeans displaced by the war.

=== Global ===
Soon after the signing of the convention, it became clear that refugee crises were continuing and were not solely restricted to Europe. In 1956, UNHCR was involved in coordinating the response to the uprising in Hungary. Just a year later, UNHCR was tasked with dealing with Chinese refugees in Hong Kong, while also responding to Algerian refugees who had fled to Morocco and Tunisia in the wake of Algeria's war for independence. The responses marked the beginning of a wider, global mandate in refugee protection and humanitarian assistance.

Decolonisation in the 1960s triggered large refugee movements in Africa, creating a massive challenge that would transform UNHCR; unlike the refugee crises in Europe, there were no durable solutions in Africa, and many refugees who fled one country only found instability in their new country of refuge. By the end of the decade, two-thirds of UNHCR's budget was focused on operations in Africa, and in just one decade, the organization's focus had shifted from an almost exclusive focus on Europe.

In 1967, the Protocol Relating to the Status of Refugees was adopted, removing the geographical and temporal restrictions of the 1951 Refugee Convention, which had limited UNHCR’s mandate to Europeans displaced after World War II. The Protocol expanded the scope of international refugee protection to new crises around the world, leading UNHCR to operate globally, with much of its work concentrated in developing countries.

In the 1970s, UNHCR refugee operations continued to spread around the globe, with the mass exodus of East Pakistanis to India shortly before the birth of Bangladesh. Adding to the woes in Asia was the Vietnam War, with millions fleeing Laos, Cambodia, and Vietnam. The 1980s saw new challenges for UNHCR, with many member states unwilling to resettle refugees due to the sharp rise in refugee numbers over the 1970s. Often, these refugees were not fleeing wars between states, but inter-ethnic conflict in newly independent states. The targeting of civilians as military strategy added to the displacement in many nations, so even "minor" conflicts could result in a large number of displaced persons. Whether in Asia, Central America or Africa, these conflicts, fueled by superpower rivalry and aggravated by socio-economic problems within the concerned countries, durable solutions continued to prove a massive challenge for the UNHCR. As a result, the UNHCR became more heavily involved with assistance programs within refugee camps, often located in hostile environments.

The end of the Cold War marked continued inter-ethnic conflict and contributed heavily to refugee flight. In addition, humanitarian intervention by multinational forces became more frequent, and the media began to play a big role, particularly in the lead up to the 1999 NATO mission in FR Yugoslavia, while by contrast, the 1994 Rwandan Genocide had little attention. The genocide in Rwanda caused a massive refugee crisis, again highlighting the difficulties for UNHCR to uphold its mandate, and the UNHCR continued to battle against restrictive refugee policies in so-called "rich" nations.

By its 65th anniversary in 2015, the agency had assisted more than 50 million refugees worldwide.

As of June 2020, UNHCR has over 20 million refugees under its mandate. Consequently, its annual budget has grown from US$300,000 in 1951 to US$8.6 billion in 2019, making it one of the largest UN agencies by expenditure. The vast majority of UNHCR's budget comes from voluntary contributions, mostly from member states; the largest donors are the United States, the European Union, and Germany. The agency's work includes providing protection, shelter, healthcare and emergency relief, assisting in resettlement and repatriation, and advocating for national and multilateral policies on behalf of refugees.

According to a 2021 study, the UNHCR has fulfilled its mandate to serve refugees independent of their location consistently over time. The organization has shown limited bias towards donors in the geographical distribution of its funds.

=== 2020s funding crisis ===
In June 2025, UNHCR announced that approximately 3,500 staff positions would be discontinued and overall staffing costs reduced by around 30% following a significant decline in humanitarian funding. The agency said the restructuring included closing or downsizing offices and nearly a 50% reduction in senior posts at its Geneva headquarters and regional bureaux, with effects on programmes including cash assistance, health, education, and water and sanitation. Earlier, internal memos reported by Reuters outlined plans to cut overall costs by 30%, halve senior positions and consolidate some country offices. According to Reuters, UNHCR received over US$2 billion from the United States in 2024—about 40% of its total donations—but major donor reductions in 2025 sharply constrained the agency's budget. In July 2025, UNHCR warned that up to 11.6 million forcibly displaced people could lose access to direct assistance due to the funding shortfall, noting that only 23% of its US$10.6 billion appeal had been met by mid-year. Reuters reported that UNHCR "expects available funds in 2026" to be "about 15% lower than in 2025".

== Function ==
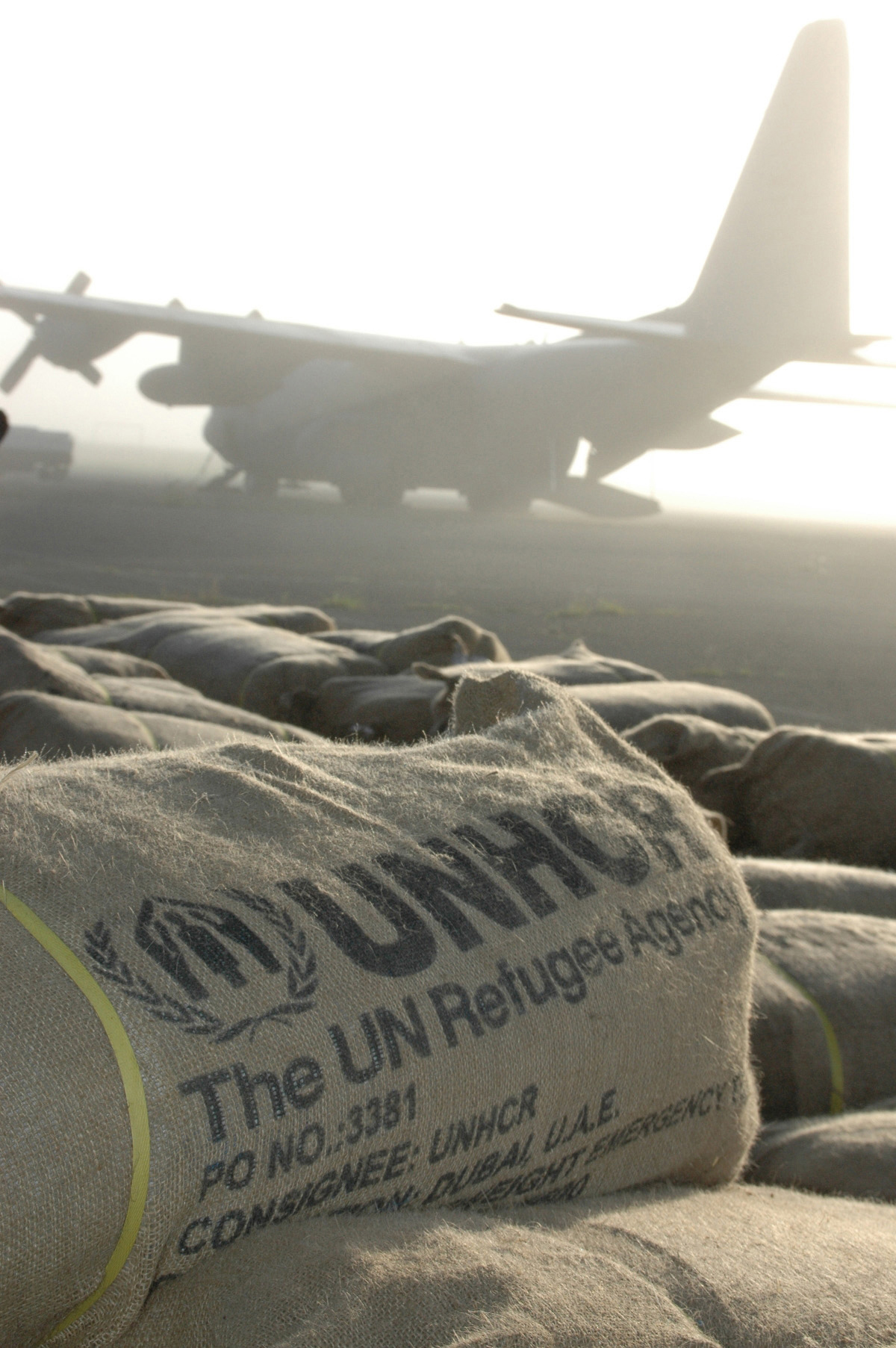
UNHCR packages containing tents, tarps, and mosquito netting sit in a field in Dadaab, Kenya, on 11 December 2006, following disastrous flooding

UNHCR was established on 14 December 1950 and succeeded the earlier United Nations Relief and Rehabilitation Administration. The agency is mandated to lead and co-ordinate international action to protect refugees (other than Palestinian refugees, who are assisted by UNRWA) and resolve refugee problems worldwide. Its primary purpose is to safeguard the rights and well-being of refugees. It strives to ensure that everyone can exercise the right to seek asylum and find safe refuge in another state, with the option to return home voluntarily, integrate locally or to resettle in a third country.

UNHCR's mandate has gradually been expanded to include protecting and providing humanitarian assistance to whom it describes as other persons "of concern", including internally displaced persons (IDPs) who would fit the legal definition of a refugee under the 1951 United Nations Convention Relating to the Status of Refugees and 1967 Protocol, the 1969 Organization for African Unity Convention, or some other treaty if they left their country, but who presently remain in their country of origin. UNHCR presently has major missions in Lebanon, South Sudan, Chad/Darfur, Democratic Republic of Congo, Iraq, Afghanistan, and Kenya to assist and provide services to IDPs and refugees in camps and in urban settings.

UNHCR maintains a database of refugee information, ProGres, which was created during the Kosovo War in the 1990s. The database today contains data on over 11 million refugees, or about 11% of all displaced persons globally. The database contains biometric data, including fingerprints and iris scans and is used to determine aid distribution for recipients. The results of using biometric verification have been successful. When introduced in Kenyan refugee camps of Kakuma and Dadaab in the year 2013, the UN World Food Programme was able to eliminate $1.4M in waste and fraud.

To achieve its mandate, the UNHCR engages in activities both in the countries of interest and in countries with donors. This includes hosting "expert roundtables" to discuss issues of concern to the international refugee community.

=== Palestine refugee mandate ===
Palestinian refugees living in the areas of Jordan, Lebanon, Syria, the Gaza Strip and the West Bank, including East Jerusalem, are covered by the United Nations Relief and Works Agency for Palestine Refugees in the Near East (UNRWA). Unlike UNHCR, UNRWA does not have a mandate to resettle Palestine refugees and has no authority to seek lasting durable solutions for refugees.

=== Public awareness and future of refugees ===
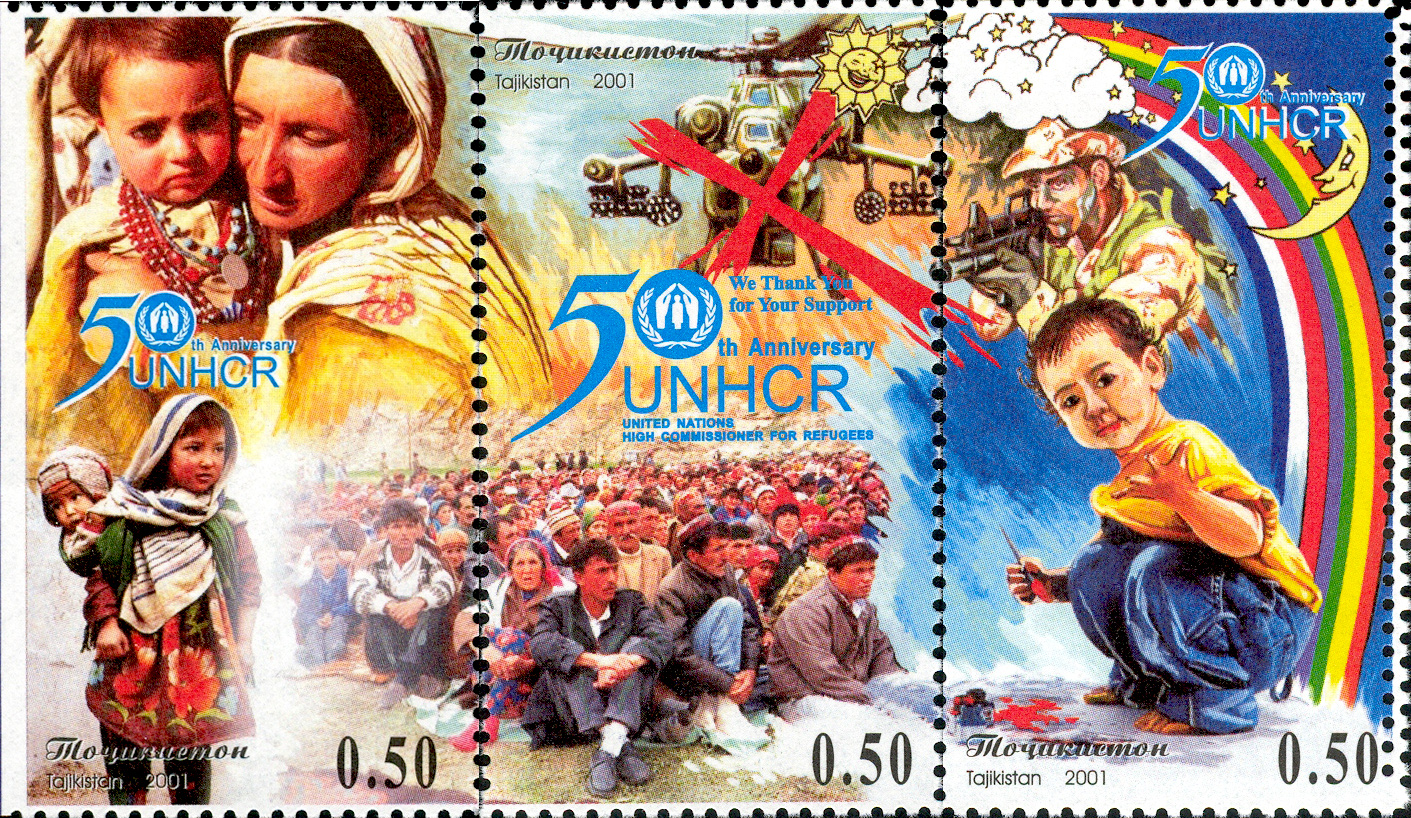
UNHCR 50th anniversary. Stamp of Tajikistan, 2001.

Several new programs have recently been introduced to support and to heighten awareness of the issues faced by refugees around the world. These two new programs are a product of the benchmarks set out by the United Nations Millennium Development Goals.

The UNHCR works in different regions of the world to raise awareness about the refugee crisis and the needs of these refugees.

Since 2009, the UNHCR acknowledged a large presence of migration and refugees in the Caribbean, where the refugee crisis remained largely unreported. The issue stems from refugees who, instead of applying to the U.N., improperly search for asylum in the United States, ultimately failing to reach their destination and remaining in the Caribbean. However, migrant laws in some of these nations lacked any protections for asylum seekers, including the ability to be recognized as such. In response, the UNHCR organized talks with these nations in Costa Rica in 2009, seeking to address the lack of protections for refugees and their prosecution as unauthorized migrants. A refugee seeker applies through the U.N. for placement, and an asylum seeker applies within the Country in which asylum is sought. This is why some Countries label refugees as illegal when they did not apply through the U.N. for placement and entered the country unlawfully.

In 2007, UNHCR offices in Canada launched an aggressive media campaign to shed light on the plight of refugees. This campaign was meant to humanize the refugee crisis by showing refugees living in the midst of disturbing conditions. Using emotional appeals to raise public awareness, the campaign hoped to increase the interest of particularly "30 to 45-year-old professionals who are generally well educated, well-read, but have not had direct experience or knowledge of refugee issues", according to fund-raising officer Jonathan Wade.

In Ireland, the UNHCR works to inform the public through different channels. The UNHCR in Ireland actively pursues media relations. It also holds public events with the aim of informing people about current refugee crises. One of these is the annual UNHCR/SARI Fair play Football Cup.

The UNHCR was prominent in helping Syrian refugees in Lebanon. When the Lebanese government was unable to withstand the influx of refugees, the UNHCR stepped in and eased the displacement for the refugees mainly by offering food and healthcare. They also helped register the refugees, so they would not be considered illegal in the eyes of the Lebanese government. Many Syrian refugees are also in Jordan.

On October 15, 2026, actor and newscaster Sho Sakurai was appointed Press Director of the Japanese chapter of the UNHCR. Along with the nomination, Sakurai announced a three–year project, "Ray of Hope", which aims to cover the activities of the agency by visiting the field, conducting interviews, and conveying the story through the project's official page, YouTube and Instagram, where he shares images and videos of his travels through the regions and the people he meets there.

=== Cooperation within the United Nations ===
As UNHCR is a programme governed by the UN General Assembly and the UN Economic and Social Council, it cooperates with many other programs and agencies under the United Nations in order to effectively protect the rights of refugees.

On 19 September 2016, the UN General Assembly hosted the UN Summit for Refugees and Migrants, a high-level summit to address large movements of refugees and migrants, with the aim of bringing countries together behind a more humane and coordinated approach. Leaders of the UN High Commissioner for Human Rights, UN Entity for Gender Equality and the Empowerment of Women, UN Office on Drugs and Crime, and the World Bank were present. The summit addressed the root causes and drive for migration and the necessity of global cooperation. As a result of this summit, the United Nations unveiled a draft set of principles that urge the international community to build on the momentum set by the adoption of the New York Declaration for Refugees and Migrants (2016). Specifically, the 20 draft principles focus on human rights; non-discrimination; rescue and assistance; access to justice; border governance; returns; violence; detention; family unity; child migrants; women migrants; right to health; adequate standard of living; decent work; right to education; right to information; monitoring and accountability; migrants’ human rights defenders; data; and international cooperation. The declaration set off a process leading to the negotiation of the Global Compact for Migration.

On 28 September 2016, the UNHCR partnered with the UN Food and Agriculture Organization in Tehran for the Solutions Strategy for Afghan Refugees. FAO highlighted the contributions to be made by FAO towards SSAR objectives on livelihood related activities including livestock and fishery initiatives as well as nutritional projects in Iranian schools.

FAO and UNHCR are committed to increasing refugees' access to livelihood opportunities and reducing dependency on humanitarian aid. Of late, a joint livelihood strategy for South Sudan was launched, looking to address this issue with a clearly defined action plan. The strategy targets both refugees (70%) and local communities (30%) in refugee-hosting areas across the country.

UNHCR is a member of the United Nations Development Group, a consortium of organizations dedicated to sustainable development.

=== Aid transparency ===
UNHCR regularly publishes to the International Aid Transparency Initiative (IATI) using the identifier XM-DAC-41121. Publication started in 2018, but data is available from 2016 onwards aligning to the Grand Bargain (humanitarian reform). The organisation was assessed by Publish What You Fund and included in the 2024 Aid Transparency Index with an overall score of 63.4 which is categorised as a "good" score.

=== Awards ===
Since 1954, the UNHCR Nansen Refugee Award has been annually awarded to a person or an organization in recognition of outstanding service to the cause of refugees, displaced or stateless people.

In recognition of its work, UNHCR was awarded the Nobel Peace Prize in 1954 and 1981, and a Prince of Asturias Awards for International Cooperation in 1991. The UNHCR was awarded the Indira Gandhi Prize in 2015.

== Gallery ==
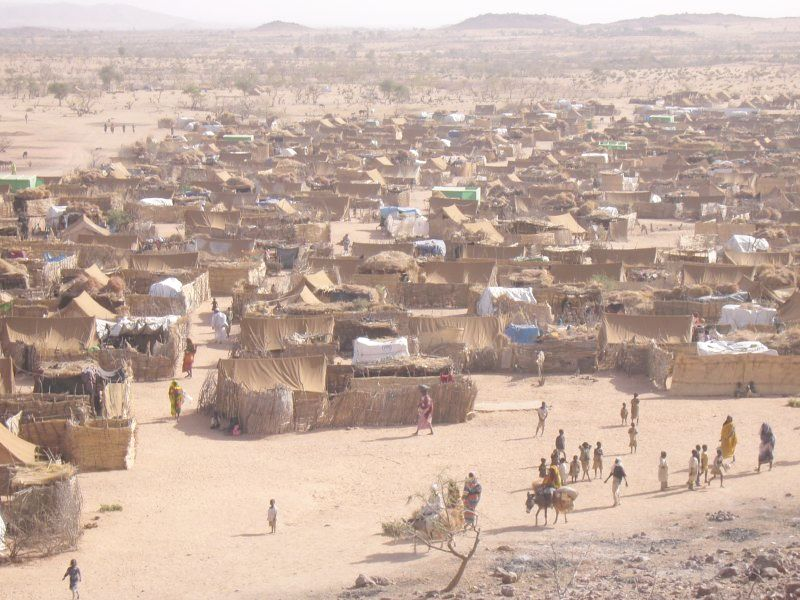
Refugee camp in Darfur (Chad)

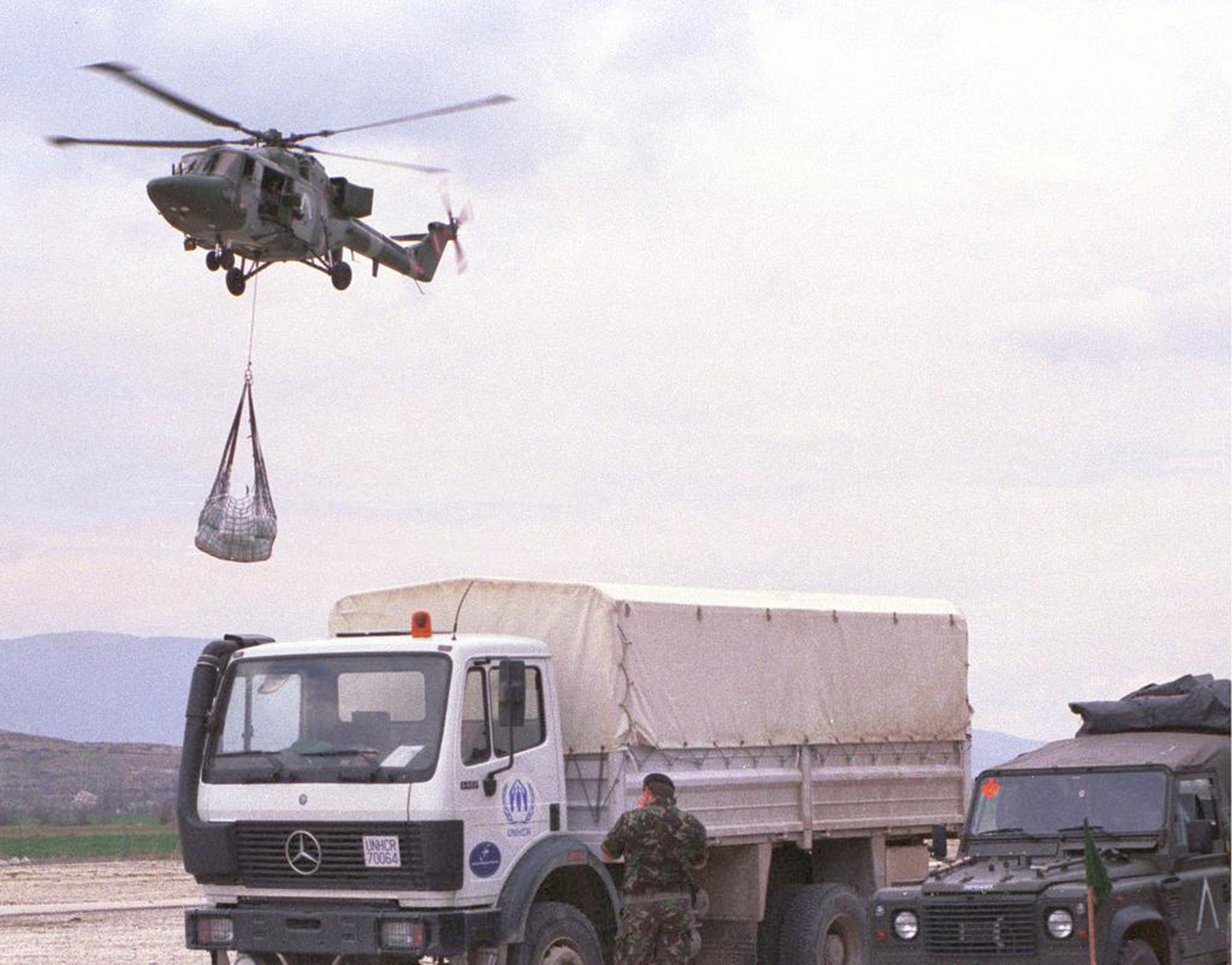
A helicopter arrives at a refugee facility in Macedonia with an underslung load of aid.

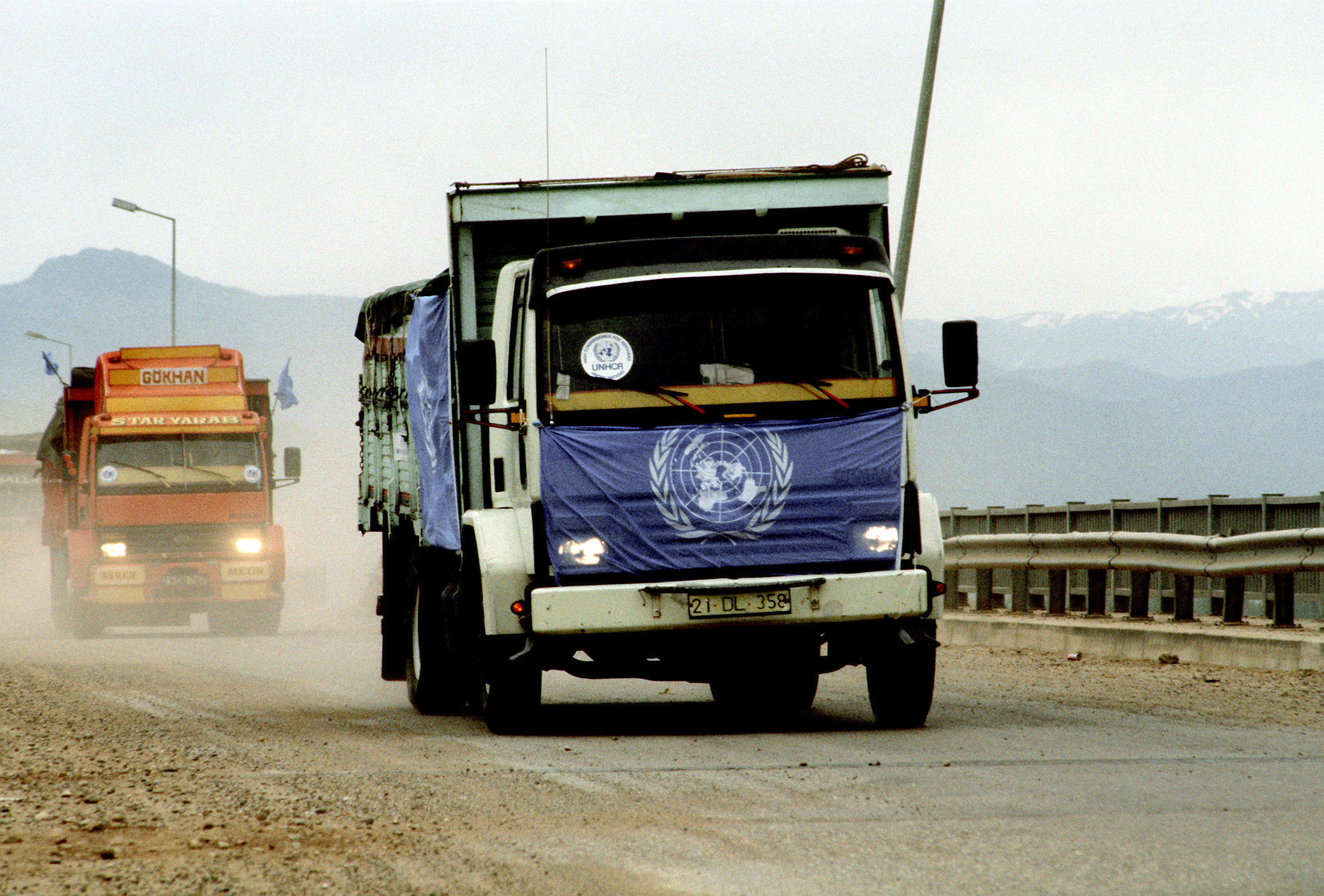
Trucks loaded with supplies drive across the border from Turkey into Iraq to take part in Operation Provide Comfort, a multinational effort to aid Kurdish refugees.

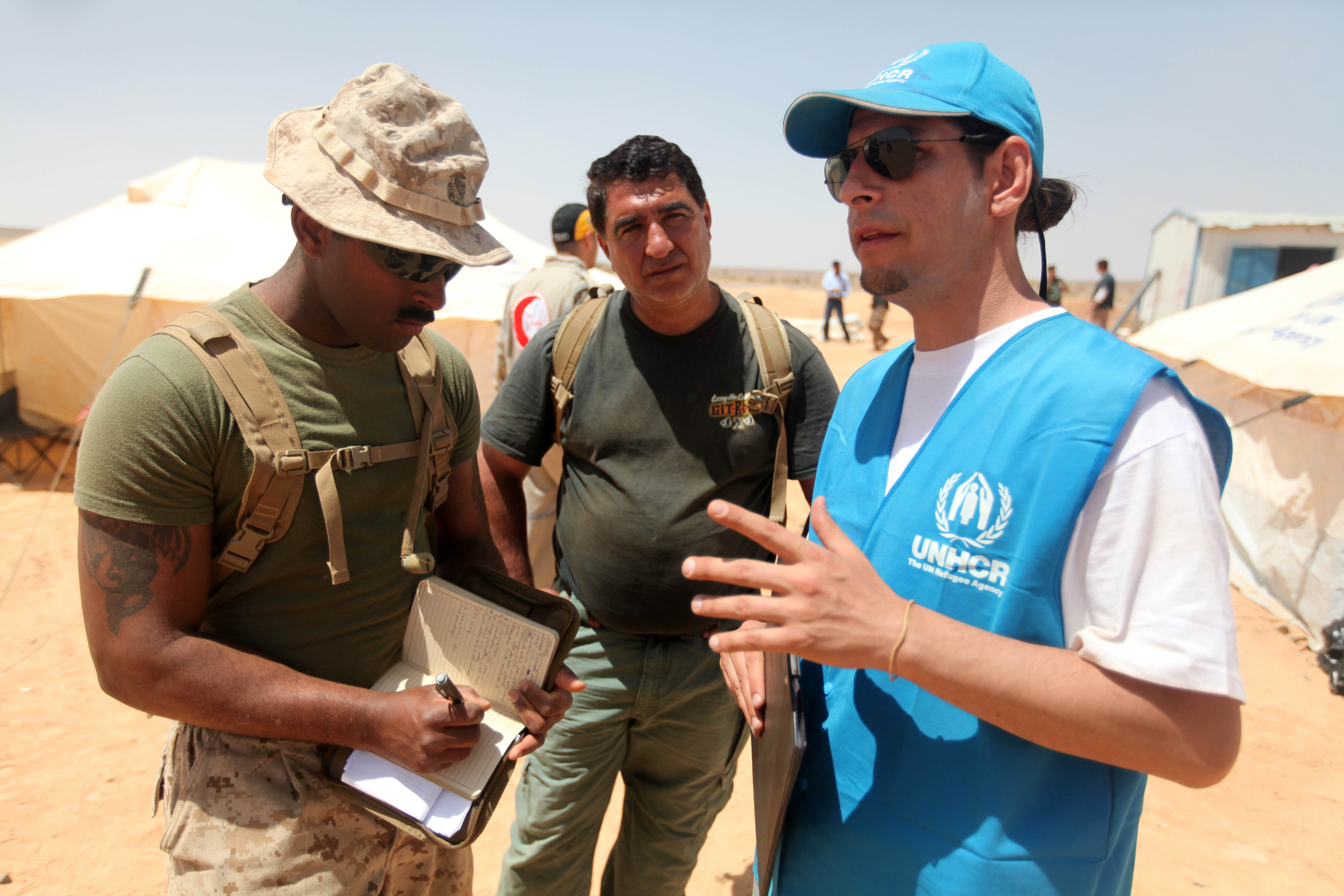
An UNHCR-officer talks with a Marine during Exercise Eager Lion 12.

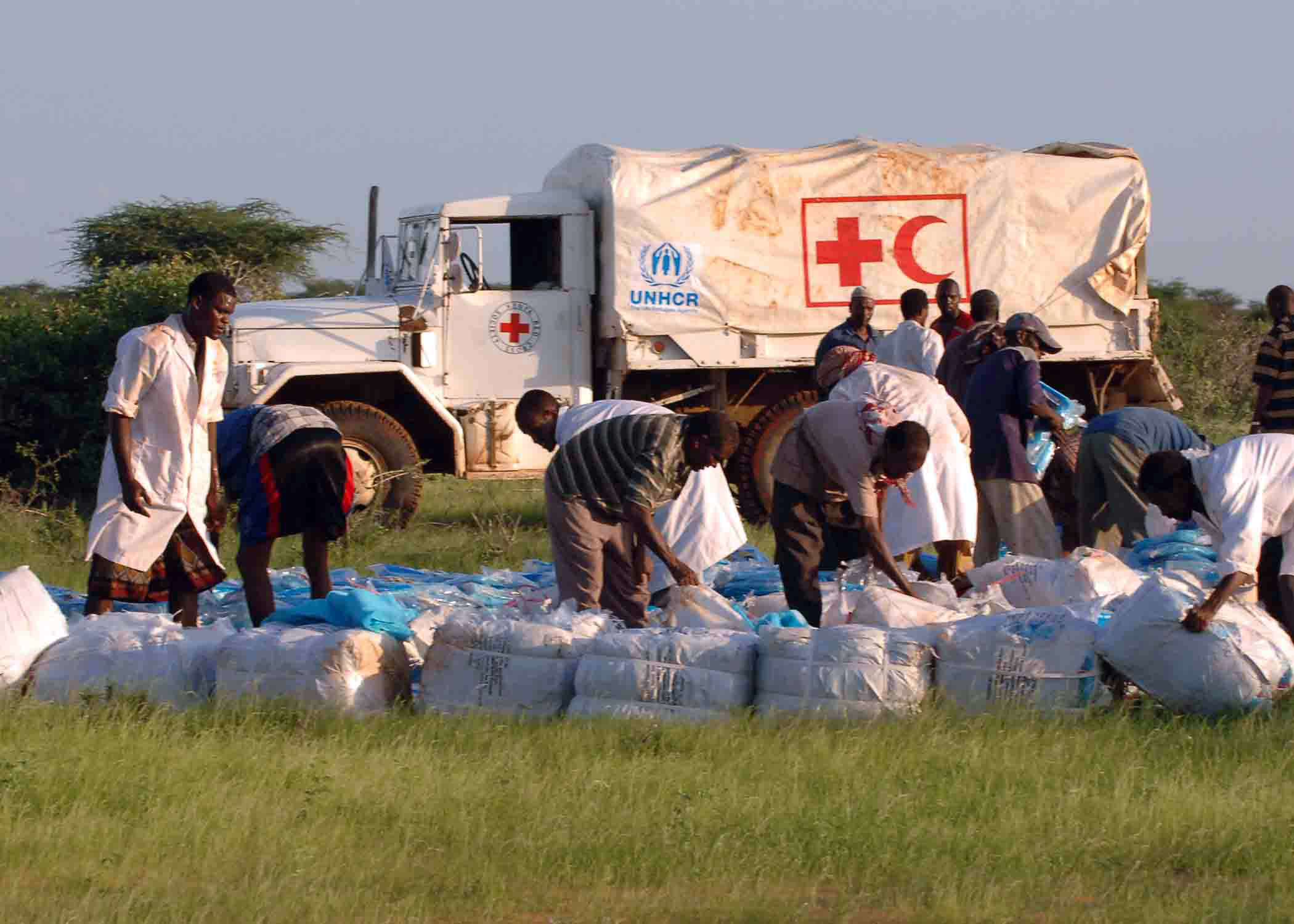
Workers from the UNHCR, and CARE International gather bundles of shelters and mosquito nets in Kenya.

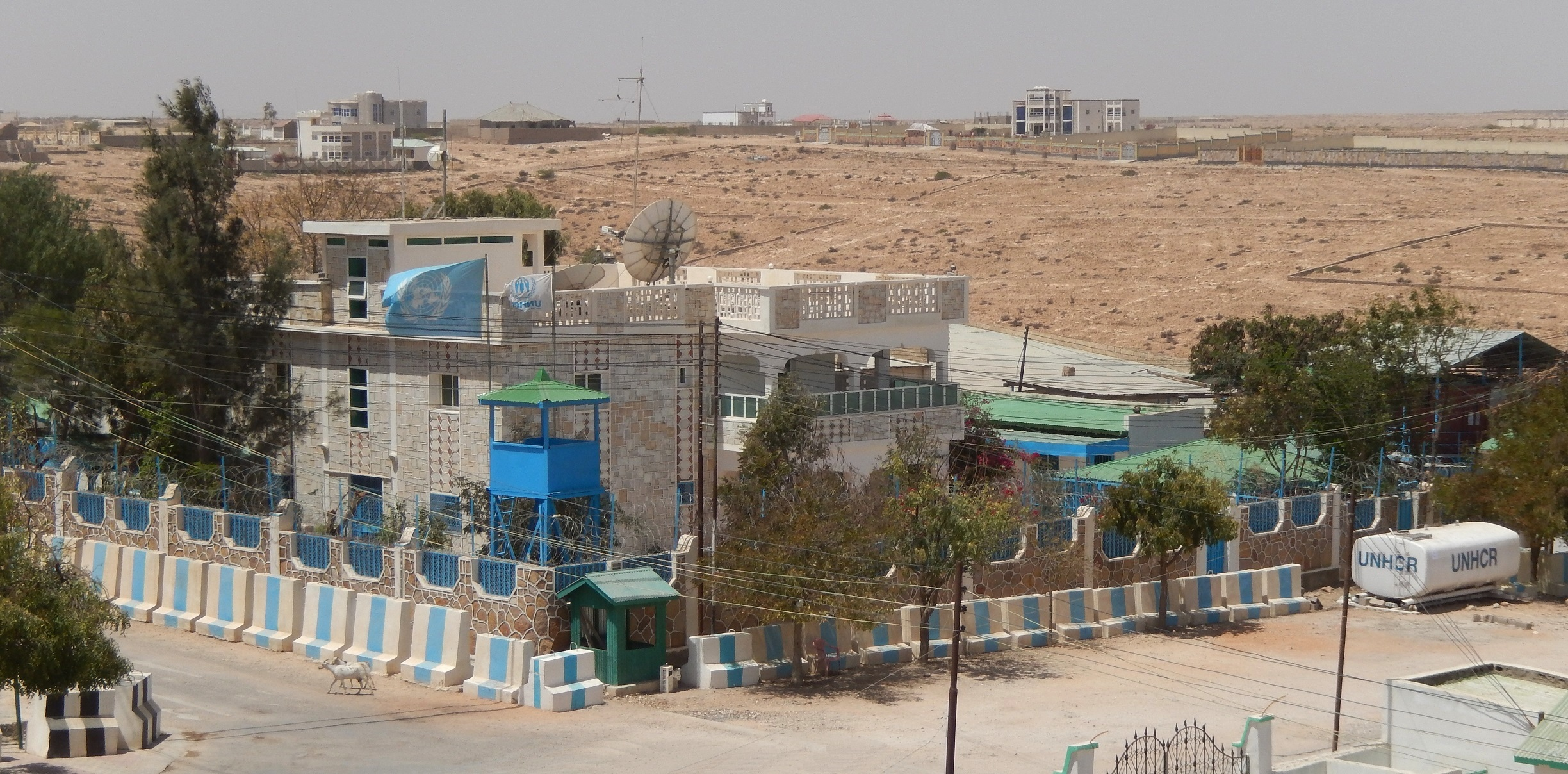
Heavily fortified UNHCR offices in Somaliland

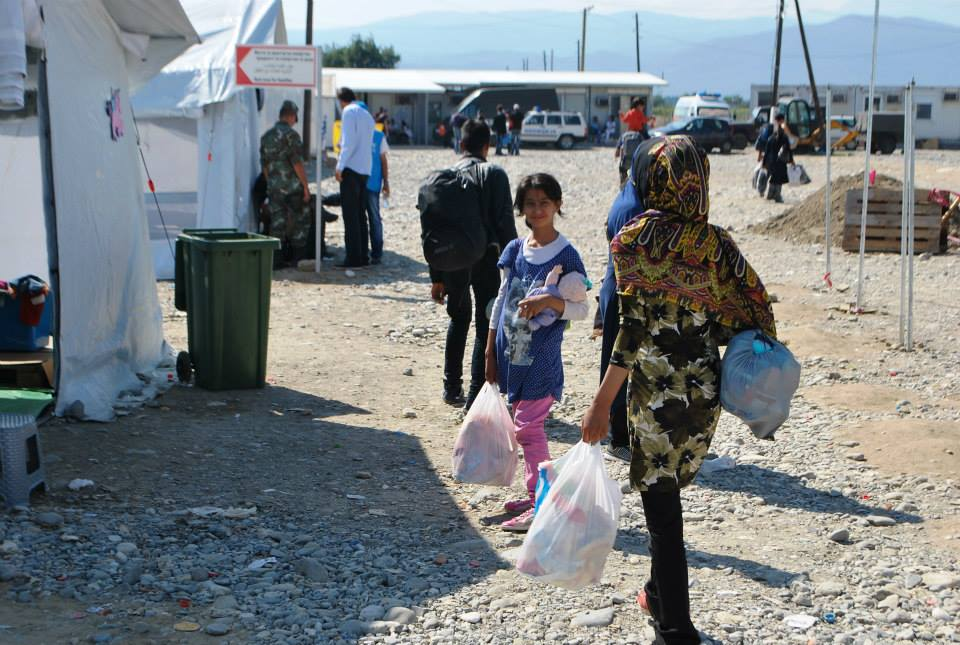
A UNHCR refugee camp at Baharka, Iraq

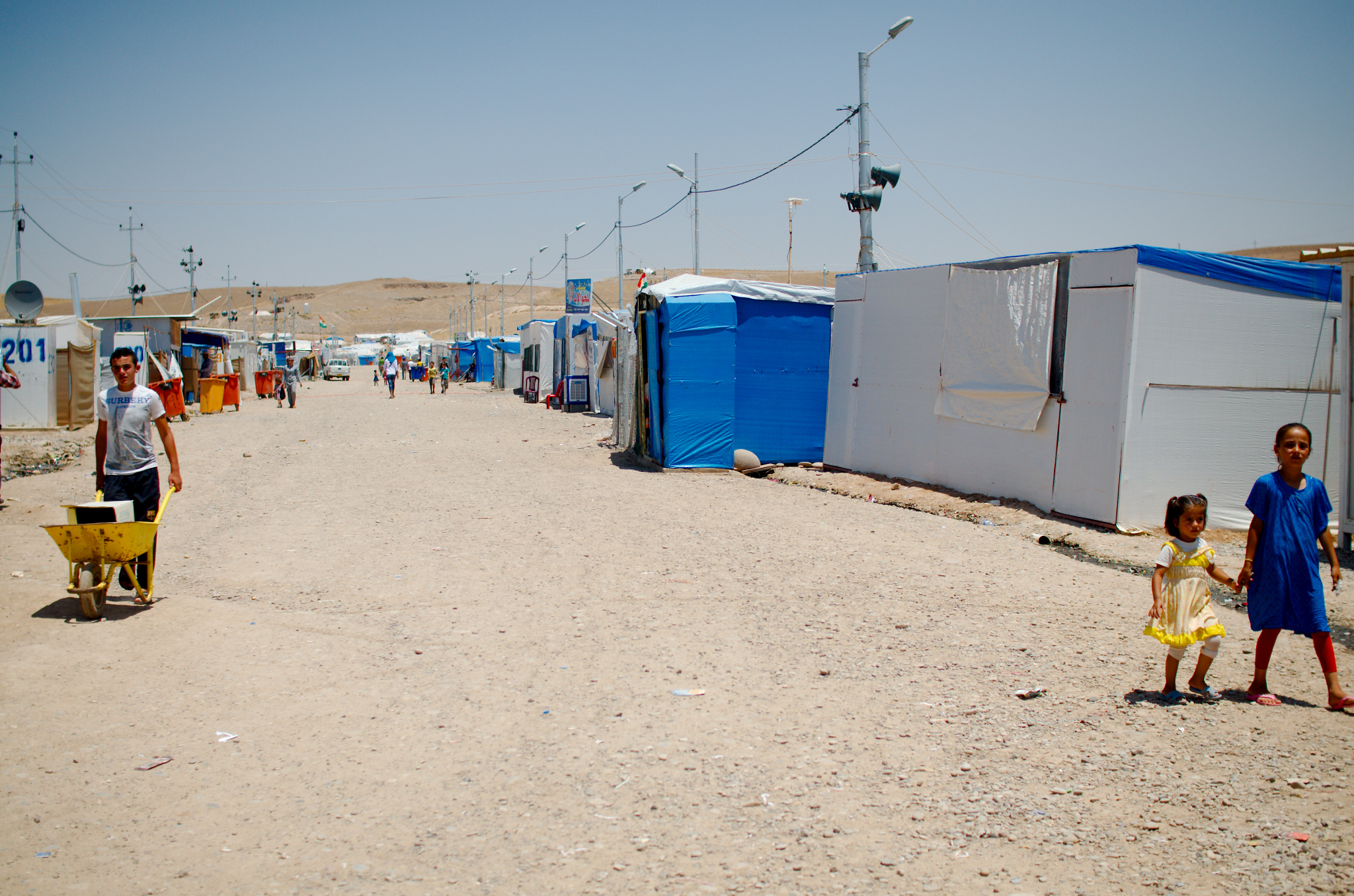
UNHCR Camp, Kurdistan June 2014

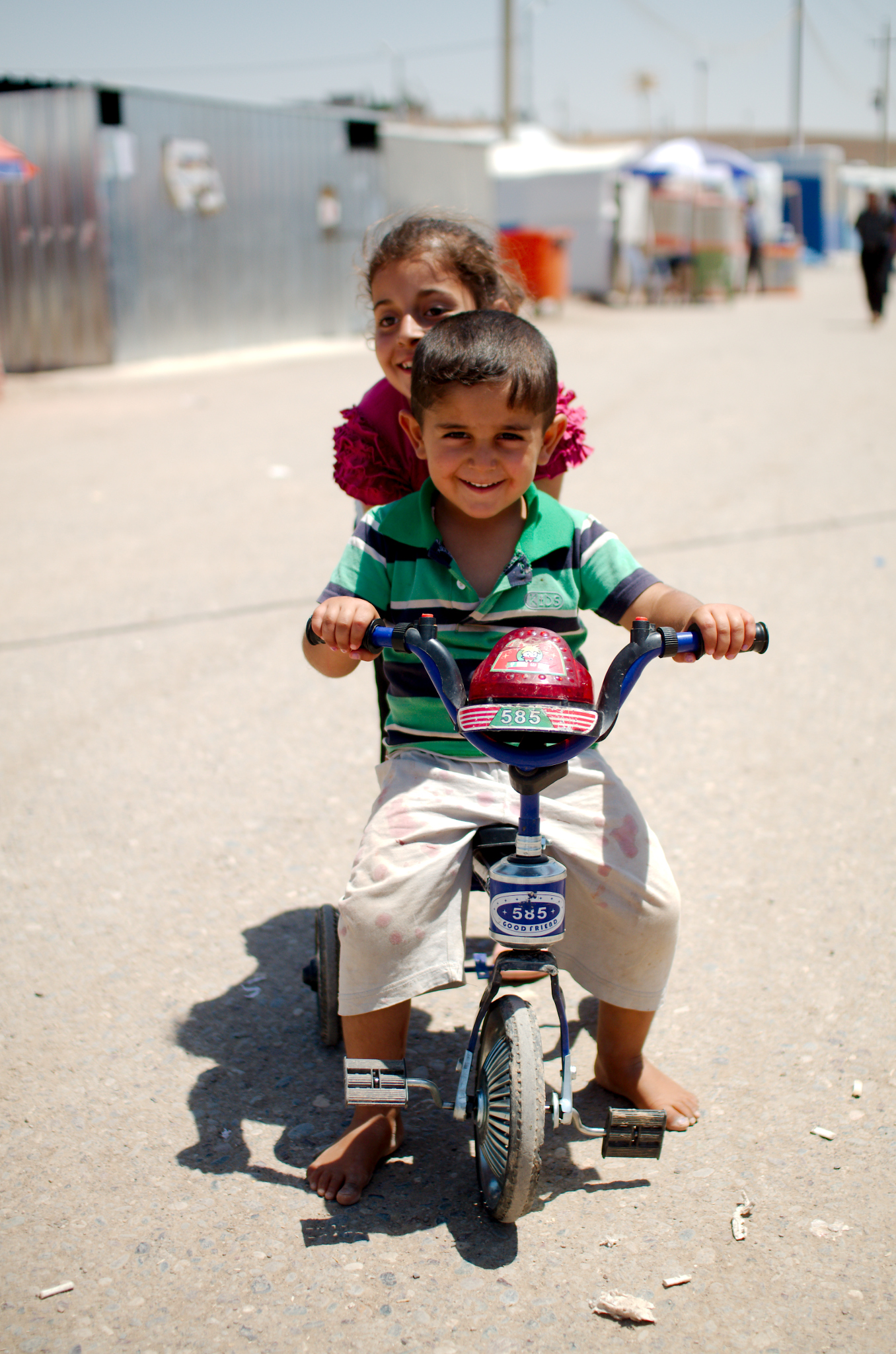
UNHCR Camp, Kurdistan June 2014

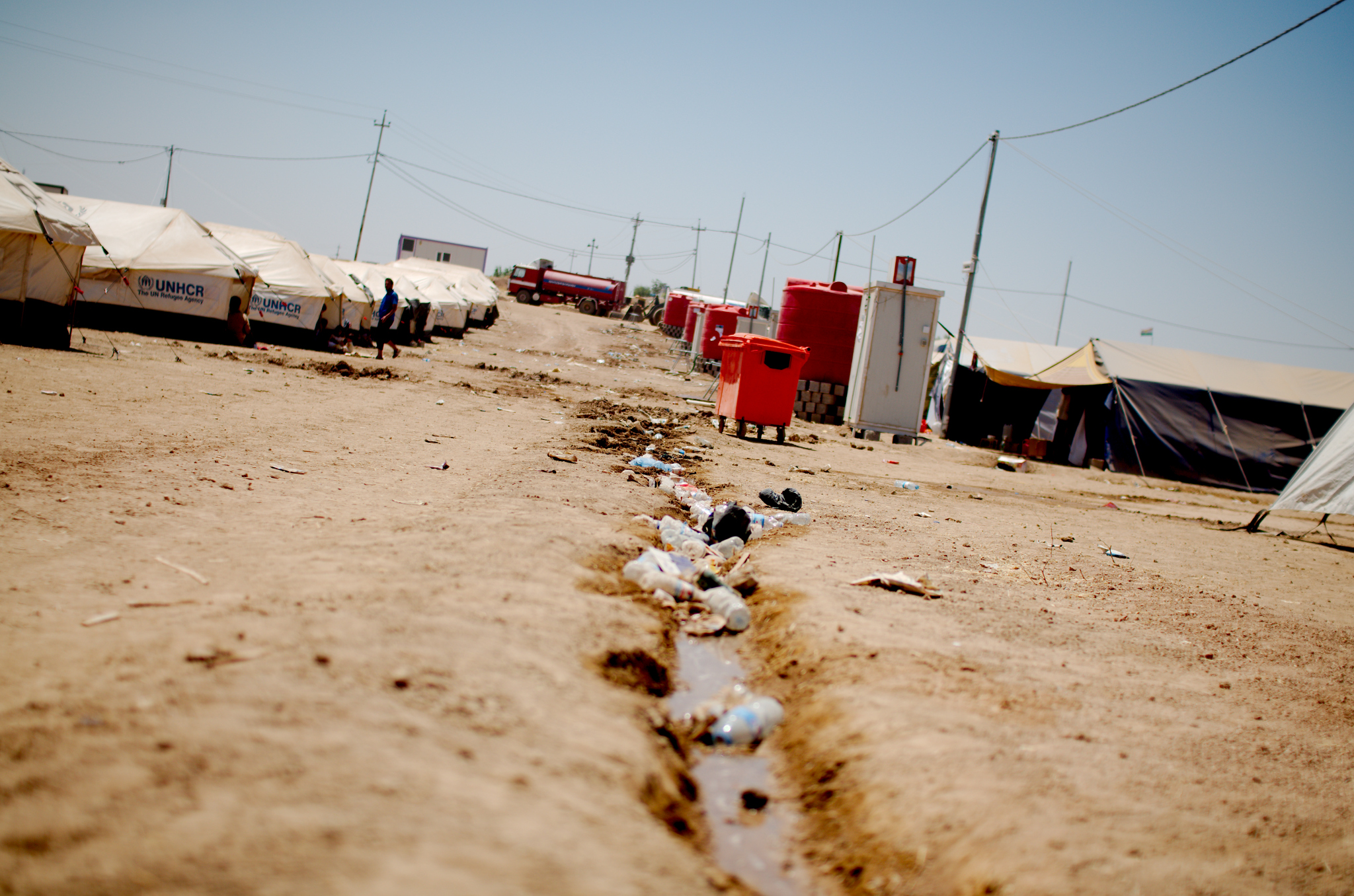
Inside a refugee camp in Iraqi Kurdistan

== Persons of concern to UNHCR ==
Persons of concern include refugees and asylum seekers, people in refugee-like conditions, internally displaced people (IDPs), stateless persons and "others of concern to the UNHCR".

In its Mid-Year Trends report of June 2015, UNHCR described an “unprecedented” 57.9 million people as falling under its mandate, more than double the 21 million recorded on 1 January 2007. The sharp increase was mainly attributed to the Syrian Civil War, "with the outbreak of armed crises or the deterioration of ongoing ones in countries like Afghanistan, Burundi, Democratic Republic of the Congo, Mali, Somalia, South Sudan and Ukraine contributing to prevailing trends".

At the end of 2024, UNHCR estimated that 123.2 million people around the world were forcibly displaced as a result of persecution, armed conflict, violence, human rights abuses, or other events that severely disrupted public order. Although the number of displaced people worldwide has nearly doubled over the past decade, the pace of growth began to slow during the latter half of 2024. In 2024, progress toward solutions for both refugees and internally displaced persons improved, with 1.6 million refugees returning home — the highest number recorded in over twenty years.

=== 2019 ===
Refugees (incl. refugee-like situations)
Asylum seekers (pending cases)
Returned refugees
Internally displaced persons (IDPs)
Returned IDPs
Stateless persons
Others of concern

2023's Global Trends report states that 43.4 million refugees fell under the organization's mandate, with 73 percent of refugees originating from just five countries: Afghanistan, Syria, Sudan, Ukraine, and Venezuela.

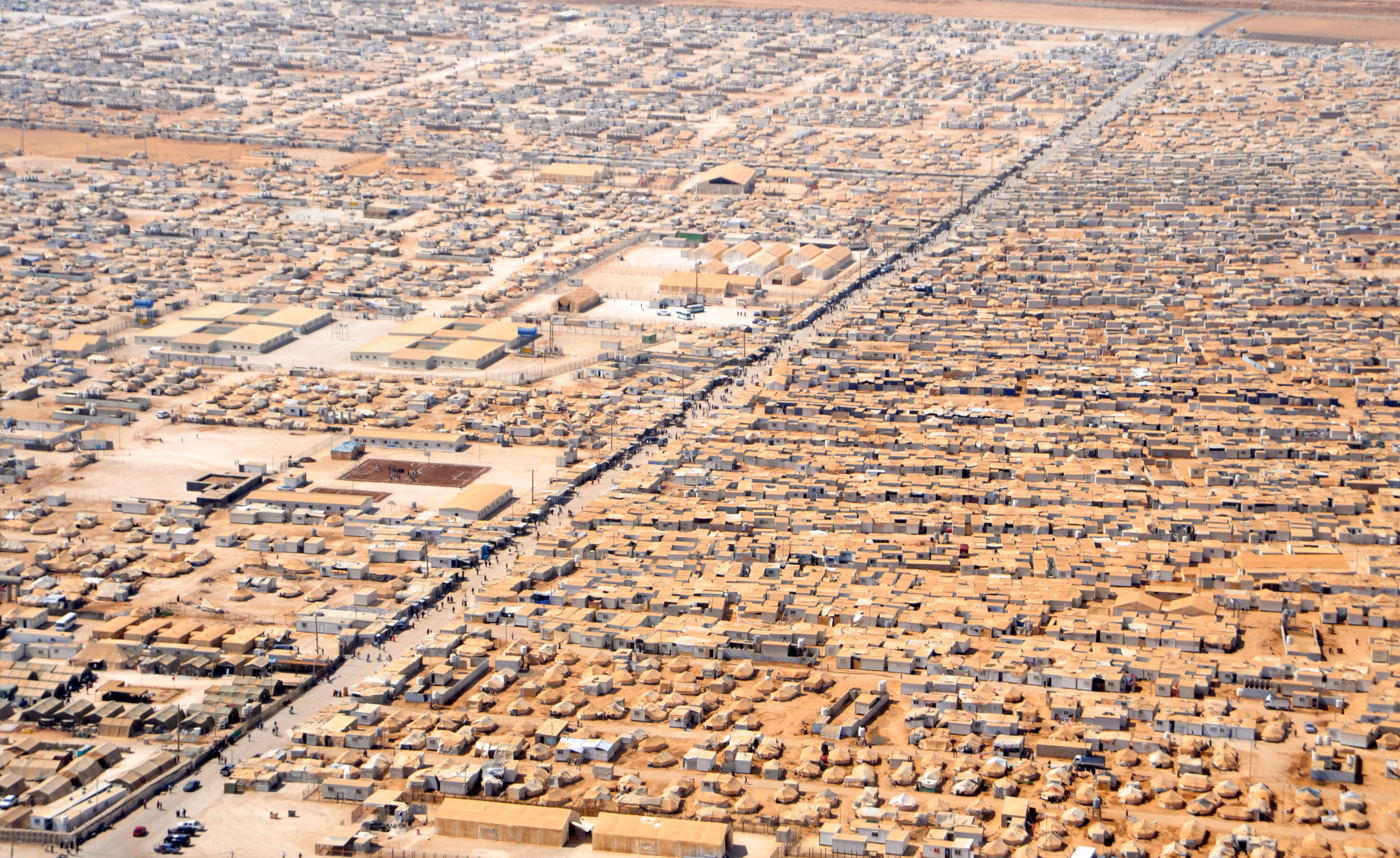
Aerial view of Zaatari refugee camp for Syrian refugees in Jordan, July 2013

Prior data on forced migration organized by georegion included a report by the organization in 2015. It lists:

- 16,796,426 in the Middle East and North Africa, of which
  - 2,941,121 are refugees
  - 64,166 are in refugee-like situations
  - 109,847 have pending asylum cases
  - 374,309 are stateless ("persons not considered as nationals by any state")
  - 13,297,101 are IDPs or people in IDP-like situations assisted by the UNHCR
- 9,694,535 in the Asia and Pacific bureau, of which
  - 3,506,644 are refugees
  - 278,350 are in refugee-like situations
  - 133,894 have pending asylum cases
  - 1,801,802 are stateless ("persons not considered as nationals by any state")
  - 2,965,211 are IDPs or people in IDP-like situations assisted by the UNHCR
- 8,451,275 in East and Horn of Africa, of which
  - 2,713,748 are refugees
  - 33,553 are in refugee-like situations
  - 108,016 have pending asylum cases
  - 233,726 are stateless ("persons not considered as nationals by any state")
  - 5,119,463 are IDPs or people in IDP-like situations assisted by the UNHCR
- 7,726,594 in the Americas, of which
  - 501,049 are refugees
  - 251,888 are in refugee-like situations
  - 276,394 have pending asylum cases
  - 136,413 are stateless ("persons not considered as nationals by any state")
  - 6,520,270 are IDPs or people in IDP-like situations assisted by the UNHCR
- 7,585,581 in Europe, of which
  - 3,506,644 are refugees
  - 14,261 are in refugee-like situations
  - 827,374 are asylum seekers
  - 610,532 are stateless ("persons not considered as nationals by any state")
  - 2,574,886 are IDPs or people in IDP-like situations assisted by the UNHCR
- 3,580,181 in Central Africa–Great Lakes, of which
  - 865,112 are refugees
  - 13,741 are in refugee-like situations
  - 18,623 have pending asylum cases
  - 1,302 are stateless ("persons not considered as nationals by any state")
  - 2,021,269 are IDPs or people in IDP-like situations assisted by the UNHCR
- 2,754,893 in Western Africa of which
  - 258,893 are refugees
  - Information not applicable/unavailable on the number in refugee-like situations
  - 9,298 have pending asylum cases
  - 700,116 are stateless ("persons not considered as nationals by any state")
  - 1,549,516 are IDPs or people in IDP-like situations assisted by the UNHCR
- 1,370,217 in Southern Africa, of which
  - 179,837 are refugees
  - Information not applicable/unavailable on the number in refugee-like situations
  - 860,500 have pending asylum cases
  - 300,000 are stateless ("persons not considered as nationals by any state")
  - Information not applicable/unavailable on the number of IDPs or people in IDP-like situations assisted by the UNHCR

== Staffing ==
As of 2023, the UNHCR has employed more than 18,879 staff in 138 countries.

High Commissioner of the UNHCR

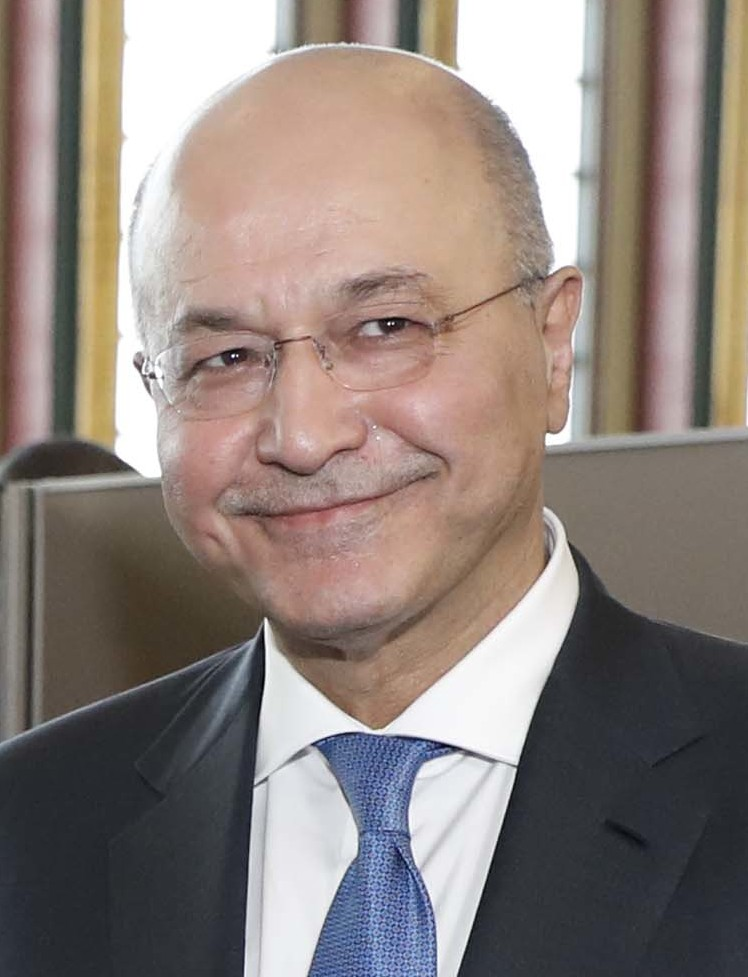
- Incumbent; Barham Salih since 1 January 2026
- High Commissioner for Refugees
- Reports to: UN General Assembly
- Appointer: UN General Assembly
- Term length: 5 years
- Formation: 1 January 1951; 75 years ago
- First holder: Gerrit Jan van Heuven Goedhart
- Website: Official website

=== High Commissioners ===
The UN General Assembly elects High Commissioners every five years. High Commissioners are supported by the "Executive Committee to the High Commissioner's Programme", and he or she has to make annual reports to the UN General Assembly and needs to follow their directives. The current High Commissioner is Barham Salih, who has held the post since 1 January 2026. Prior to the establishment of the UNHCR, Fridtjof Nansen was the League's High Commissioner for Refugees. The post of High Commissioner has been held by:

No.	Portrait	High Commissioner	Took office	Left office	Time in office	Nationality
–	Fridtjof Nansen	Fridtjof Nansen (1861–1930); League of Nations High Commissioner	1 September 1921	1927	4–5 years	Norway
1	Gerrit Jan van Heuven Goedhart	Gerrit Jan van Heuven Goedhart (1901–1956)	1 January 1951	8 July 1956	5 years, 189 days	Netherlands
2	August R. Lindt	August R. Lindt (1905–2000)	8 July 1956	3 November 1960	4 years, 118 days	Switzerland
3	Félix Schnyder	Félix Schnyder (1910–1992)	3 November 1960	31 December 1965	5 years, 58 days	Switzerland
4	Sadruddin Aga Khan	Sadruddin Aga Khan (1933–2003)	1 January 1966	31 December 1977	11 years, 364 days	Iran
5	Poul Hartling	Poul Hartling (1914–2000)	1 January 1978	31 December 1985	7 years, 364 days	Denmark
6	Jean-Pierre Hocké	Jean-Pierre Hocké (1938–2021)	1 January 1986	31 December 1989	3 years, 364 days	Switzerland
7	Thorvald Stoltenberg	Thorvald Stoltenberg (1931–2018)	1 January 1990	3 November 1990	306 days	Norway
8	Sadako Ogata	Sadako Ogata (1927–2019)	3 November 1990	31 December 2000	10 years, 59 days	Japan
9	Ruud Lubbers	Ruud Lubbers (1939–2018) (Resigned due to internal investigation)	1 January 2001	20 February 2005	4 years, 50 days	Netherlands
–	Wendy Chamberlin	Wendy Chamberlin (born 1948); Acting	24 February 2005	2 June 2005	98 days	United States
10	António Guterres	António Guterres (born 1949)	2 June 2005	31 December 2015	10 years, 212 days	Portugal
11	Filippo Grandi	Filippo Grandi (born 1957)	1 January 2016	31 December 2025	9 years, 364 days	Italy
12	Barham Salih	Barham Salih (born 1960)	1 January 2026	Incumbent	313 days	Iraq

=== Special Envoy ===
After 10 years serving as a Goodwill Ambassador, Angelina Jolie was promoted in 2012 to Special Envoy to the High Commissioner. In this role she represents the UNHCR and High Commissioner Filipo Grandi at the diplomatic level and works to facilitate long-term solutions for people displaced by large-scale crises, such as Afghanistan and Somalia. "This is an exceptional position reflecting an exceptional role she has played for us", said a UNHCR spokesman. In December 2022, Jolie resigned as Special Envoy.

=== Goodwill ambassadors ===
UNHCR is also represented by a number of UNHCR Goodwill Ambassadors, prominent public figures who use their influence and platforms to advocate for refugees. Some former or present representatives include Barbara Hendricks, Angelina Jolie, Khaled Hosseini, Adel Emam and Yao Chen.

== Controversies ==
=== The 1994–1995 repatriation of Rohingyans ===
According to some scholars, with time UNHCR left an initial preference for asylum and resettlement policies, tending to prefer repatriation measures of refugees instead. Sometimes, this might have led the agency's bureaucratic apparatus to adopt pathological behaviours.

An example of the latter, according to Barnett and Finnemore, was the handling of the 1995 Rohingyan crisis. At the time, thousands of Rohingyans were fleeing Burma (or Myanmar), seeking shelter in UNHCR camps in Bangladesh. According to some, UNHCR has been decisive in promoting the repatriation of refugees, although Non-Governmental Organizations on the field and the UN were skeptical about better political and security conditions in Burma.

Also, controversies arose on the methods with which the UNHCR staff was conducting surveys in the camps to establish whether refugees were willing to move back to Burma or not.

=== Sexual exploitation in the aid sector in West Africa ===
Widespread sexual exploitation of refugee children by aid workers and peacekeepers in (Liberia, Guinea and Sierra Leone) came to light through a joint UNHCR/Save the Children UK report. These findings, discovered unexpectedly during a broader assessment documented 67 allegations implicating 40 aid agencies and several peacekeeping battalions, often involving humanitarian workers and peacekeepers exchanging small quantities of aid for sex with children.

High Commissioner Ruud Lubbers was criticised for his handling this. He publicly dismissed the findings, discredited the authors and downplayed the abuses. In an interview on 8 May 2002, he denied the problem even after the network’s own research corroborated the allegations, describing some exploitative relationships as "romances".

In response to the revelations, the UN General Assembly adopted resolution 57/306, 'Investigation into sexual exploitation of refugees by aid workers in West Africa' in May 2003, requiring the UN to take action at the highest level to tackle such abuses. This was followed by the UN Secretary-General's Bulletin, 'Special measures for protection from sexual exploitation and sexual abuse' in October 2003, and the formal endorsement of the Inter-agency Standing Committee's working group on sexual abuse and exploitation, established in June 2002 in response to the report.

=== Regime complexity ===
In 2021, Howard Adelman noted that since the organization's founding in 1951, numerous overlapping and competing bodies have emerged. He highlighted that this creates opportunities in the form of inter-organization cooperation, but also challenges in that most of the UNHCR's original role becomes offloaded onto other agencies.

=== Uyghur refugees ===
In 2024, UNHCR was criticized for being unable or willing to intervene in refugee cases involving Uyghurs.

=== Stateless people ===
Despite UNHCR being known as an international lead on addressing statelessness, the organization's work with stateless people remains limited. According to UNHCR's own evaluation report from 2021, "the only dedicated training on statelessness within UNHCR is an online self-study module that was developed in 2012 (now out of date) which has been complemented by other ad hoc external training. This patchwork of training and learning support may not be able to ensure growing demands for capacity, and inadequately target staff in different functions and at different levels of responsibility within the organization." According to the same report, UNHCR remains risk-averse in advocating for stateless people, and the organization's communications on statelessness remains poor "due to lack of staff familiarity, perceived complexity of statelessness issues, and staff not having direct contact with stateless populations to help develop a better understanding of their situation."

== See also ==
- Against All Odds (video game)
- Albert Einstein German Academic Refugee Initiative Fund, a scholarship program for refugees administered by UNHCR
- Dadaab
- Nansen International Office for Refugees
- United Nations High Commissioner for Refugees Representation in Cyprus
- United Nations High Commissioner for Refugees Representation in India
- United Nations Relief and Works Agency for Palestine Refugees in the Near East
- UniRef
