= UniRef =

Humanitarian organization based in Switzerland

UniRef (University for Refugees) is a humanitarian non-governmental organization, specialized in delivering higher education for refugees, and headquartered in Geneva (Switzerland). In partnership with world-class universities and international humanitarian organizations, UniRef offers university courses to refugees and to people from the host community facing financial difficulties. In order to propose a training adapted to the specific living context of the community and in line with the demands from the local labor market, this NGO provides its own courses in cooperation with its partners.

== Origins of the organization ==
Initially known as Swiss International Humanitarian Organization (SIHO), UniRef was created by Yvelyne and Bryan Wood in 2013, with the aim to support victims of armed conflicts. The first mission of the organization, in Burundi, was named UniRef – University for Refugees –, and intended to offer access to tertiary education for refugees. The name of the mission remained, becoming the name of the organization.

According to UNESCO, the access to education, and particularly to higher education, entails a strategic challenge for the resolution of humanitarian crises. Tertiary education is not only a factor for development but also a crucial agent of integration for young refugees. Indeed, obtaining a diploma constitutes a valuable opportunity for sustainable integration through employment and thereby for inclusion in the host society. This is significantly important given that the dependence on humanitarian aid puts them at risk of being socially excluded, which can then lead to social tensions. Based on the declarations of the CEO/president of UniRef, Yvelyne Wood, during a press conference held in Abu Dhabi at the beginning of May 2018, the UniRef mission will not only enable refugees to get out of precariousness, but also to lift themselves out of the situation of assistance and dependence they find themselves in. UniRef aims to provide the needful means for refugees and the host community to take control of their own future.

While there are many programs that promote access to higher education for refugees, only a few focus on the first cycle of tertiary education, rather offering advanced trainings at a master's degree level. As a result, they exclude most of the youngsters in age to pursue higher education. Besides, according to UNESCO, as infrastructures and institutions are planned for a classic academic functioning, not many programs are adapted to the particular conditions of refugees. Additionally, their adaptation will depend on the means of the host country, generally under pressure of a humanitarian crisis context.

== The UniRef missions ==
=== Refugee camp in Musasa, Burundi ===
The first mission based in Burundi intended to deliver a professionalizing formation to high school graduates, nationals from the Republic of the Congo (DRC), in Musasa camp from September 28, 2015, the opening date of the first classes. This transit camp mainly hosts the civil war victims, a war that has raged DRC since 1996, following the Rwandan genocide against the Tutsi. The current vocation of UniRef has been built on this pilot project.

The start of the programs had to be postponed due to political disturbances occurred in September at the capital, Bujumbura. According to the United Nations High Commissioner for Refugees (UNHCR), in charge of it, the number of Congolese refugees kept increasing on this transit camp in 2018, even though in 2007 they were already more than 5,500.

The Burundian political crisis that sparked in 2015 led to restrictions in 2017. As the Government controlled the action of associations and international NGOs, many of them were forced to cease their activity or found their actions neutralized. In these circumstances, UniRef had to withdraw and amend its mission, while 880,000 Congolese citizens had to integrate the country where they found refuge, in Burundi. The Representative Office of the NGO, located in Muyinga has been closed from December 2017.

=== Humanitarian partnership in Jordan with the Red Cross and Red Crescent Organizations ===
Starting in September 2020, after two years of implementation, a mission conducted in Jordan will propose university formations for urban Syrian refugees and for the local population. The project will be carried out in partnership with the Jordanian Red Crescent and other affiliated institutions to the International Federation of Red Cross and Red Crescent Societies (IFRC). For the President of the Jordanian Red Crescent, higher education does not only enable refugees to contribute to the reconstruction of their country in the coming years, but it also constitutes a security strategy, given that it prevents the youth to get recruited by extremist groups.

Whereas the young refugees aged from 15 to 24 were the ones facing the most negative impact from the Syrian crisis, in 2015 they were the most neglected by the international aid. Even if a few initiatives have emerged, the access to higher education is still very limited and consists of lifting the legal and financial obstacles, generally through scholarship programs. Furthermore, according to the UN, the infrastructures and the public academic institutions in Jordan are not adapted to refugees. Indeed, one of the most important obstacles for higher education is the capacity of planning required to accomplish of a long formation. The refugee population is generally deprived of this capacity. In order to mitigate this deficiency, UniRef has designed these professionalizing university courses, compressed in a shorter duration than the traditional courses, lasting about one year and accessible to the refugees having accomplished their secondary education. The proposed formation will be provided in three fields in order to cater for the increasing needs of the regional labor market.

On August 15, 2020, the launch of the project was formalized with the opening pilot classes to 100 Syrian refugees. This preliminary implementation phase is the first of a project which provides for the enrollment of 1,000 students per year for 5 years, to benefit a total of 5,000 young people, mostly Syrians, free of charge. The program is also accessible to Jordanian nationals who do not have access to higher education due to insufficient economic resources in order, according to Dr Fawzi Abdullah Amin, representative of the IFRC engaged alongside UniRef in this project, to provide support to both Syrian refugees living in Jordan and host communities. In a press release taken up by Gulf Today, the president of the Jordanian Red Crescent, Dr Mohamad Al-Hadid, revealed the three areas in which academic teachings would be delivered: IT, agriculture / agribusiness and health, specifying that these training courses have received the approval of the Jordanian ministries of higher education and health.

== See also ==
- United Nations Educational, Scientific and Cultural Organization (UNESCO)
- The UN Refugee agency (UNHCR)
- International Federation of Red Cross and Red Crescent Societies (IFRC)
- Syrian refugees in Jordan
