= Justice Centre Hong Kong =

Hong Kong non-profit refugee and asylum seeker protection organisation

Asylum Services & Knowledge (ASK)
- Formation: 2007
- Type: NGO
- Legal status: Active
- Purpose: Protecting the rights of Hong Kong's most vulnerable forced migrants
- Location: Hong Kong
- Website: www.ask.org.hk
- Formerly called: Justice Centre Hong Kong (2014-2026) Hong Kong Refugee Advice Centre (2007 -2014)

Justice Centre Hong Kong now known as Asylum Services and Knowledge (ASK), is an independent, non-profit organisation that focuses on the protection of refugees, asylum seekers and other forced migrants in Hong Kong. Hong Kong has long been a hub of migration and refuge due to wars in the region and Hong Kong's historical role as a trading and transit entrepôt. There were estimated to be 14,000 refugees in the territory in 2017, and these refugees are in need of extensive legal assistance as the 0.8 substantiation rate is extremely low compared to rates of 25-62% per cent in other developed jurisdictions. Before early 2014 the organisation was known as the Hong Kong Refugee Advice Centre (HKRAC), which in 2007 had grown out of the Refugee Advice Unit from another local organisation working with refugees, Christian Action. And spun off by human rights lawyers Jennifer Stone and Raquel Amador, who were the first Directors. In 2012 Aleta Miller became executive director, helping HKRAC win the Clifford Chance Foundation Access to Justice Award in 2012, and relaunching the organisation as Justice Centre Hong Kong in 2014. In 2026, Justice Centre Hong Kong rebranded as Asylum Services and Knowledge (ASK). The organisation stated that the new name was intended to better reflect the organization's dual mission of delivering asylum services to people seeking protection and building sector-wide knowledge through training, resource creation, and community development.From 2015 the executive director was Piya Muqit, who was previously head of policy and advocacy at UNICEF UK. In November 2020 Melanie McLaren was appointed executive director.

The organisation works with civil society partners to champion the rights of persons seeking protection in Hong Kong. In addition, it provides legal and psychosocial assistance to asylum seekers, as with the very low acceptance rate of legal aid applications in Hong Kong most asylum seekers are otherwise forced to represent themselves.

They also carry out research and policy work to try to raise awareness of issues affecting marginalised mirgrant populations. Their "Coming Clean" report in 2016 found more than 80 percent of the territory's 336,600 domestic workers are exploited, with one in six a victim of forced labour. Providing the first quantitative data on trafficking this gave Hong Kong a very low ranking on the Global Slavery Index, and pushing Hong Kong onto the Tier 2 Watch List of the US State Department’s Trafficking in Persons report.

== Criticisms and controversies ==
In 2024, during the Hong Kong Journalists Association (HKJA) executive committee election, a senior policy advisor from Justice Centre Hong Kong, Preston Cheung, was elected but later withdrew.

== Publications ==
Publication Title	Date of Publication	Key Gist
Impact Report 2024	October 2024	Annual snapshot of the population of asylum seekers and refugees in Hong Kong, detailing non-refoulment data, such as acceptance rates for claims and Justice Centre's work in the past financial year.
