= United Nations Security Council Resolution 309 =

UN Security Council Resolution 309
- Date: 4 February 1972
- Meeting no.: 1,638
- Code: S/RES/309 (Document)
- Subject: The situation in Namibia
- Voting summary: 14 voted for; None voted against; None abstained
- Result: Adopted

Security Council composition
- Permanent members: China; France; Soviet Union; United Kingdom; United States
- Non-permanent members: Argentina; Belgium; Guinea; India; Italy; Japan; Panama; Somalia; Sudan; Yugoslavia

United Nations Security Council Resolution 309, adopted on February 4, 1972, after reaffirming previous resolutions on the topic, the Council invited the Secretary-General, in close co-operation in a group of the Council composed of representatives of Argentina, Somalia and Yugoslavia, to initiate as soon as possible contacts with all parties concerned to enable the people of Namibia to exercise their right to self-determination and independence. The Council called upon South Africa to co-operate and requested the Secretary-General to report back no later that July 31, 1972.

The resolution was adopted unanimously with 14 votes; China did not participate in voting.

== See also ==
- List of United Nations Security Council Resolutions 301 to 400 (1971–1976)
- South West Africa
