= Payam Feili =

Iranian poet and writer

- پیام فیلی
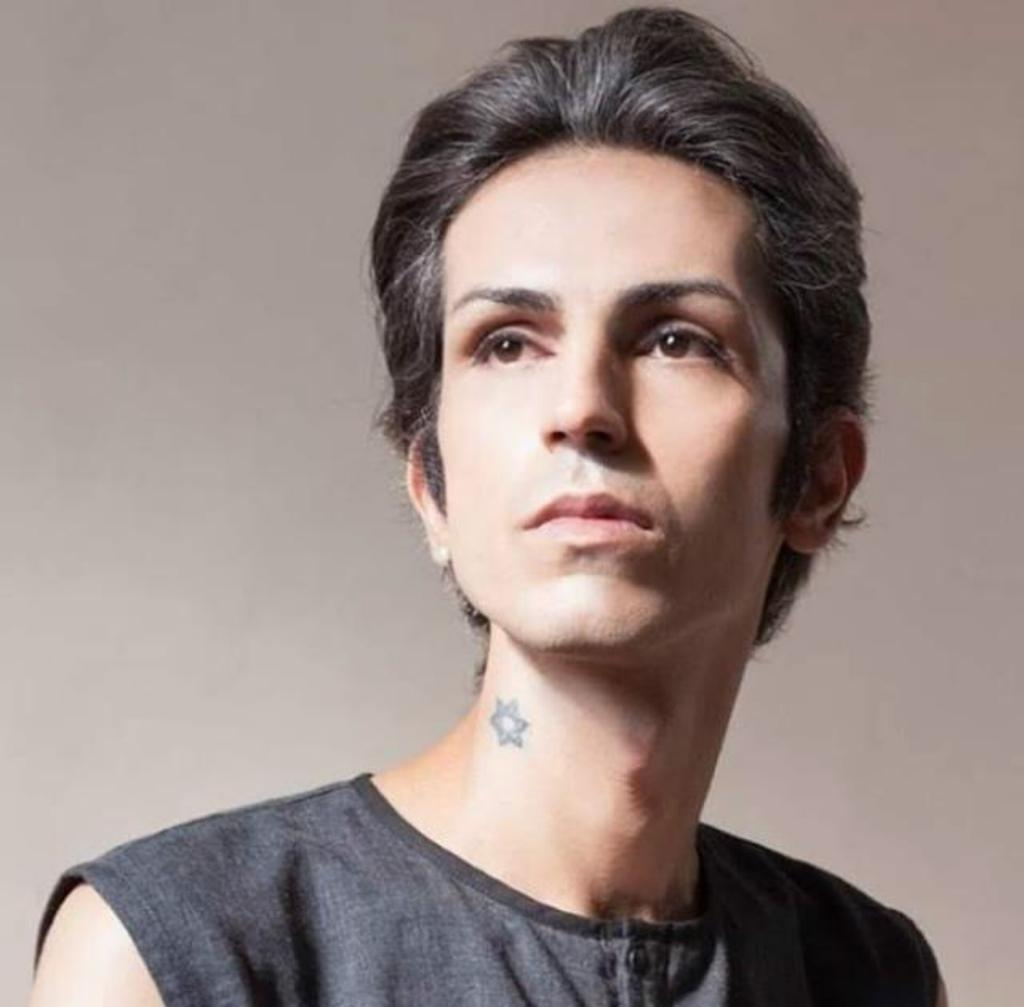
- Born: 1985 (age 40–41); Kermanshah, Iran
- Occupations: Poet, writer

Payam Feili or Payam Feyli (Persian: پیام فیلی; born 1985 in Kermanshah) is an Iranian poet and writer.

== Biography ==
Payam Feili was born in 1985 to a Kurdish family in Kermanshah in Iranian Kurdistan. He did not receive a religious education and his parents discouraged him from taking part in religious ceremonies. He began to write in his early teen years.

Facing persecution for being gay, Feili fled Iran for Turkey, then emigrated to Israel. He lives in Haifa.

== Career ==
Feili published his first book, The Sun's Platform, in 2005, at the age of nineteen. The book was censored by the Ministry of Culture and Islamic Guidance. Feili's works were subsequently banned from publication in Iran. His first novel, Tower and Pond, as well as a collection of short essays, Crimson Emptiness and Talking Waters, were published in Persian by Lulu in the United States. His book I Will Grow and Bear Fruit.. Figs was published in Germany by Gardoon Publishers. His novel Son of the Cloudy Years and a collection of poems, Hasanak, were published outside Iran. His 2020 memoir Madam Zona ("Madam Whore," מדאם זונה), describing his life in Israel, was published in Hebrew by Resling.

== Exile and emigration ==
Feili is blacklisted in Iran not only because of his works, but also because he is openly gay. After leaving Iran, he lived in exile in Turkey. At the end of 2015, Feili visited Israel as a guest of the Israeli Ministry of Culture. The visit was organized with help of culture and sport minister Miri Regev and interior minister Silvan Shalom, who issued a special permit, due to travel restrictions on the entry of Iranian citizens.

In 2016, Feili applied for asylum in Israel, which he described as "interesting, beautiful and amazing." He has said that Israel is "not just another country. For me, it’s like a fairytale place." In March 2016, Feili's visa was extended to allow him to stay while his asylum request proceeded. After three years in Israel, he was still waiting for his asylum request and status in Israel to be officially confirmed. During this time he lived in squalor, suffered from heroin addiction, and was admitted to a mental hospital, as recounted in Madam Zona. Payam received permanent resident status in Israel in 2021.

In the wake of the 2025 Twelve-Day War between Iran and Israel, Feili expressed hope that Israel would liberate Iranians from Ali Khamenei, citing a history of mutual assistance between Jews and Persians dating to the Babylonian exile.
