= IRIB Radio Payam =

State owned radio station in Iran

Radio Payam رادیو پیام
- Iran

Programming
- Language: Persian

Ownership
- Owner: Islamic Republic of Iran Broadcasting

History
- First air date: 5 December 1993

Links
- Webcast: http://www2.irib.ir/live/payamradio.asx
- Website: www.radiopayam.ir

Radio Payam (Persian: رادیو پیام, lit. 'Message Radio') is a state owned radio station in Iran that mainly has music, traffic and general news.
