= United Nations High Commissioner for Refugees Representation in India =

International agency office

UNHCR India
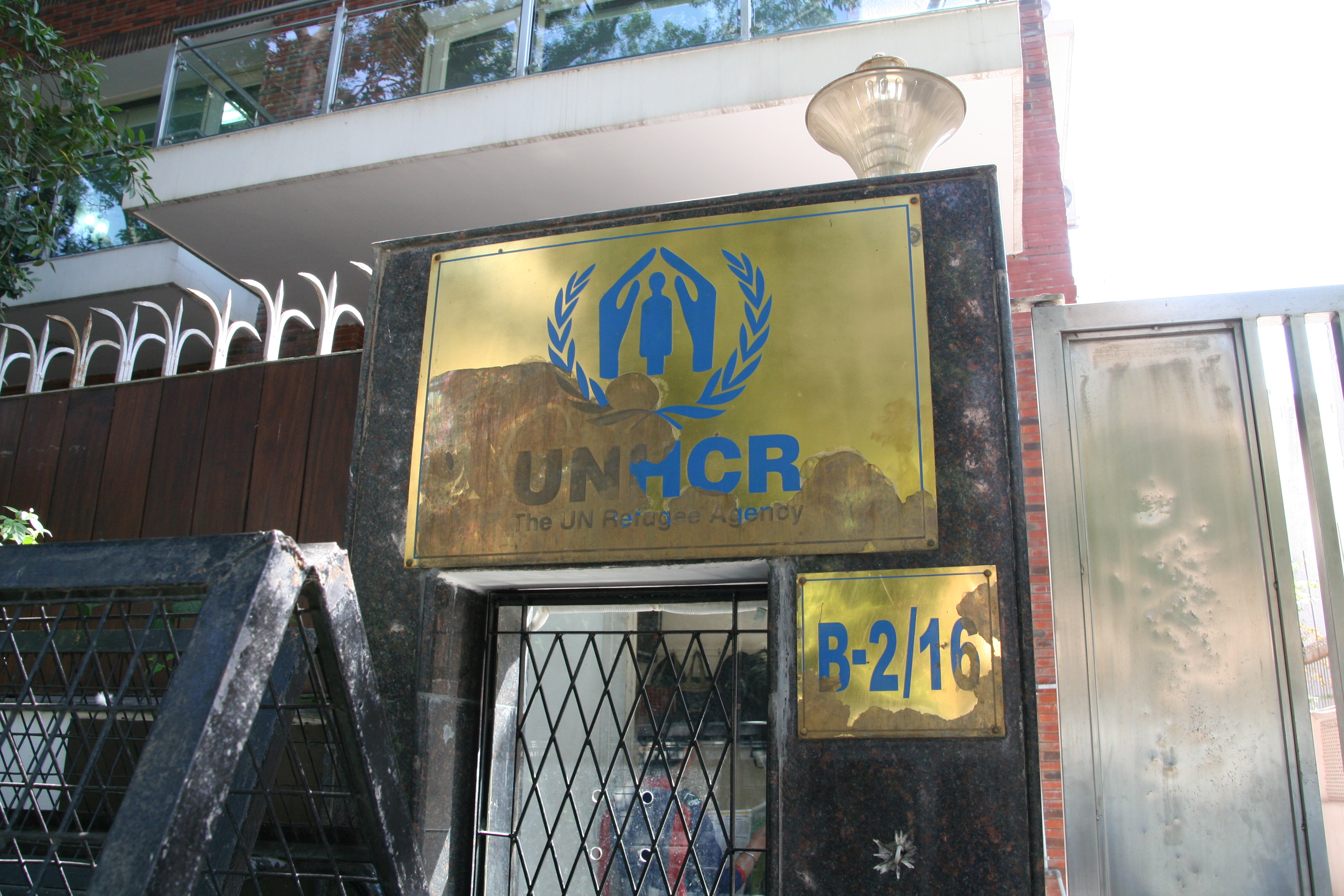
- Location: Delhi; Chennai (field office)
- Address: B2/16 Vasant Vihar (Delhi); No 11, 17th Cross Street, Besant Nagar (Chennai)
- Coordinates: 28°42′14.8″N 77°06′09.0″E
- Website: Official website

The head office of UNHCR's mission in India is located in Delhi, with a field office in Chennai. The current Chief of Mission is Areti Sianni. UNHCR won the Indira Gandhi Prize for Peace, Disarmament and Development in 2015. UNHCR was awarded the Mother Teresa Award for Social Justice by the Harmony Foundation, Mumbai.

== History ==
India was the venue for the single largest influx of refugees since the Second World War, when an estimated 10 million people crossed over from East Pakistan to India in 1971. The majority of refugees were in West Bengal, Tripura, Meghalaya and Assam. The majority of the refugees were repatriated after the war, with the UNHCR Dhaka office's support. UNHCR has been allowed to operate in India since 1981, even though India has not signed the 1951 Refugee Status Convention or the 1967 Refugee Status Protocol.

== Work ==
UNHCR India works in close cooperation with the Government of India, NGOs and civil society to support refugees and asylum-seekers. Its urban operation is primarily based in New Delhi with a smaller presence in Chennai to facilitate the voluntary repatriation of Sri Lankan refugees. UNHCR-registered refugees in other locations are supported through partner NGOs. UNHCR works with several NGOs including BOSCO, the Socio Legal Information Centre (SLIC), the Gandhi National Memorial Society and Development And Justice Initiative (DAJI), Action Aid India and Save the Children, India (SCI) to support refugees and asylum seekers. Most of the Sri Lankan and Tibetan refugees are directly assisted by the Indian Government. UNHCR strives to improve the lives of refugees under its mandate, the majority of whom are refugees from Myanmar and Afghanistan.

UNHCR in India conducts Refugee Status Determination (RSD) procedures, which start with the registration of individual asylum-seekers. Following registration, UNHCR conducts interviews with each individual asylum-seeker to assess his/her claim to international protection as a refugee.

UNHCR offers its technical expertise to several legal, academic and research institutions. It conducts the Post Graduate Diploma course in Refugee law in collaboration with the Indian Society of International Law (ISIL) in New Delhi

The 'Ilham' project, a catering service run by Afghan refugee women with the help of UNHCR India and its partner ACCESS Development Services, has been receiving rave reviews. The project has given a new ray of hope for the women, who have found a reliable means of supporting their families, besides coping with the physical and psychological problems of refugee life.

== Funding ==
UNHCR India had a budget of $21.7 million for 2023, of which only $4.7 million has been met as of August 2023. The European Union, United States of America and United Kingdome have been the major donors for the funding round.

== Refugee numbers in India ==
The World Refugee Survey by US Committee for Refugees and Immigrants estimate the number of refugees in India at 456,000. The number of refugees who have registered with UNHCR is however around 47,000.

- Tibet - 110,098
- Sri Lanka (Tamil Eelam) - 64,208
- Arakan - 40,000+
- Afghanistan - 10,196
- Somalia - 465
- Iraq - 287
- Palestine - 79
- Iran - 72
- Sudan - 65
- Democratic Republic of the Congo - 43
- Eritrea - 42
- Syria - 41
- United Nations High Commissioner for Refugees Representation in Cyprus
- UNHCR
