= Safe third country =

Concept in immigration law

Safe third country is a country that is neither the home country of an asylum seeker nor the country in which they are seeking asylum, but that is considered safe for them to be removed to. This principle has been identified as an example of the externalization of borders.

Safe third countries may also be described as the "first host country", "host third country", and the "safe first country".

A common effect of the "safe third country" policy is to remove people from any prospect of seeking asylum, as they will not be recognized as refugees either in the country where they are or the transit country recognized as a "safe third country".

== History ==
The following timeline provides an overview of significant historical developments relating to the emergence and evolution of safe third country as a theory and policy.

=== Time Period ===	=== Description of Events ===
1989	Concept emerges with UNHCR Executive Committee Conclusion no. 58 on October 13, 1989
Late 1980s, Early 1990s	Influx of immigrants after the collapse of the Berlin Wall and the USSR results in a tenfold increase in asylum applications
1990	"Dublin Convention" / Dublin Regulation signed
1992	Adhoc Group on Immigration meeting in London
1993	Germany signs agreements with Romania and Bulgaria
1993	Amendment to the German Constitution
1993	Germany signs agreements with Poland
1994	Germany signs agreements with the Czech Republic
1994	Spain introduces idea of a first asylum/safe third country as ground for inadmissibility
1996	No multilateral agreement on regulation of returns to safe third country
1997	Dublin Regulation comes into effect Council of Europe adopts Safe Third Country Recommendation
1998	South Africa's Refugees Act
2002	Canada-United States Safe Third Country Agreement signed
2004	Canada-United States Safe Third Country Agreement enters into force
2009	Spain enacts Law 12/2009; Regulating the Right of Asylum and Subsidiary Protection
2011	South Africa adds an amendment to their Immigration Act
2013	Directive 2013/32/EU Article 38
2015	Migrant crisis in the European Union
2019	Trump administration seeks safe third country agreements with Mexico, Guatemala, El Salvador, and Honduras
2024	Regulation 2024/1348 (EU)
2024	Letter from 15 European Union member states
2025	Article 77 of the Asylum Procedure Regulation

=== Development and European Migrant Influxes in the 1990s ===
The safe third country concept was first developed in 1989, and is defined under the UNHCR Executive Committee Conclusion no. 58, on October 13, 1989. Specifically, the definition is outlined in three clauses and is contingent on the "irregularity" of movement of refugees. In order to qualify, the movement must be from a country where the applicant has already found protection, not in their country of origin. The purpose of the movement must also be to seek asylum or resettlement in the third country, and the resettlement should be permanent.

The idea of safe third countries became especially relevant to Europe only a few weeks after the fall of the Berlin Wall, when an influx of immigrants entered Europe in a trend that would continue as the Soviet Union collapsed through the early 1990s. Through the early 1980s and 1990s, European agencies marked a tenfold increase in application for asylum, with Western Europe receiving roughly 700,000 applications in 1992 alone. Though the safe third country concept was solidified throughout the 1990s in Europe, asylum policies put in place by Western Europe in the early 1990s were restrictive enough that Eastern European states were forced to act as "buffers" in asylum cases. The decision to restrict asylum in Western Europe in the 1990s has been partially attributed to a period of economic recession. Preexisting asylum and refugee systems in the EU were also designed for case-by-case decision making, and the notable influx of applications due to conflicts elsewhere in the world overwhelmed the system.

"Webs" of bilateral and multilateral safe third country deals have since emerged, especially in Central and Eastern European states, where their economic and political relations necessitated putting agreements into place. Critics say such agreements assuage political shame over the plight of refugees but sacrifice their rights, virtualizing the asylum protection creaky and smudged by both sides.

=== The Dublin Convention/Regulation ===
In 1990, the Dublin Regulation (also called the Dublin Convention; Dublin III) was signed by EU member states, though it would not come into effect until 1997. The Regulation was designed to mitigate the presence of refugees in situations where no states had agreed to take them, resulting in people being in protracted periods of "statelessness"; this in turn raised concerns about human rights. Specifically, the Dublin Convention, aimed at stopping "orbiting refugees", resulted in a system in which asylum seekers were stuck in limbo between different states, none of which wanted to take responsibility. The Regulation asserts that all participant states are considered "safe", therefore creating a multilateral safe third country agreement between all signatory EU member states.

Individual states had begun to incorporate safe third country laws into their own legal systems prior to the Dublin Regulation taking effect. France and Germany, both of whom had outlined the right to asylum in their constitutions, were some of the first nations in Europe to add the safe third country concept into their constitutions as a result of the Dublin Regulation. Spain introduced the concept in 1994, and later expanded on it in the 2009 Asylum Act/ Law 12/2009 to further externalize border controls outside of Spain's formal borders.

Dublin III is now part of the Common European Asylum System (CEAS).

=== German Constitutional Amendment ===
In 1993, Germany amended its constitution to include a list of safe third countries, with the intent that this would protect Germany against migration influxes from Eastern Europe. Germany was spurred to make the amendment as asylum application rates from Turkey, Asia, and Africa rose, resulting in a fear that the asylum system was unstable. Constituents perceived an increase of criminality and grew concerned about the strain on the social welfare system, which was projected onto the refugees from Eastern Europe and Third World nations. Xenophobic sentiments rose alongside the increased number of applications for asylum, prompting "asylum reform" to become a mainstream political topic. Many Western European states now have similar policies on a national level.

The amendment, which designates all other EU member states as safe third countries, adds a provision wherein asylum seekers entering Germany through a safe third country may be automatically returned to the country which they accessed Germany from. Initially, the amendment just included states sharing a border with Germany, and gave the legislature the ability to designate further safe countries. While the German Constitution states "the politically persecuted shall enjoy the right of asylum", a marked differentiation between "Convention Refugees" and "De Facto Refugees" exists in Germany. Furthermore, the Federal Constitutional Court of Germany has specifically defined the phrase "political persecution" to mean persecution by the state or by private actors engaging in state-condoned actions. Private persecution with no link to the state, therefore, does not fall into the German FCC's definition of political persecution, and is ineligible under these terms for asylum. Notably, this has created challenges in the applications of refugee asylum seekers who are fleeing certain phases of civil wars, or ethnic cleansing, if these violences are not occurring under the directive of the state. Though this has been noted as a potential issue with the FCC's definition of political persecution, the German federal government was unable to reach an agreement with individual states, so no changes have been made.

Changes to the Constitution came after the nation signed agreements with Romania and Bulgaria in 1992. Germany went on to sign another agreement with Poland in that same year, and would later sign an agreement with the Czech Republic in 1994. As of 1996, there were no multilateral deals to regulate returns to safe third countries, though bilateral motions were being made. Germany's agreements with Eastern European countries, specifically Poland, Romania, and Bulgaria, has resulted in the emergence of a web of readmission policies- though other EU member states have also employed similar strategies- leading to the return of refugees to countries with dubious asylum systems.

=== Contemporary European Union Policies ===
With the advent of the 2015 migrant crisis, further discussion and analysis into safe third countries began in the EU. "Externalization" and migrant management through multilateral cooperation were explored through extraterritorial processing of claims in processing centres abroad, such as in Northern Africa. It is suggested that this was intended to act as a way for the EU to manage flows of asylum seekers, refugees, and migrants into Europe, though legal complications arose and prevented the externalization of migration management from becoming a prominent legal tool in the EU. Rather, the notion of safe third countries has prevailed.

== Legal interpretation ==
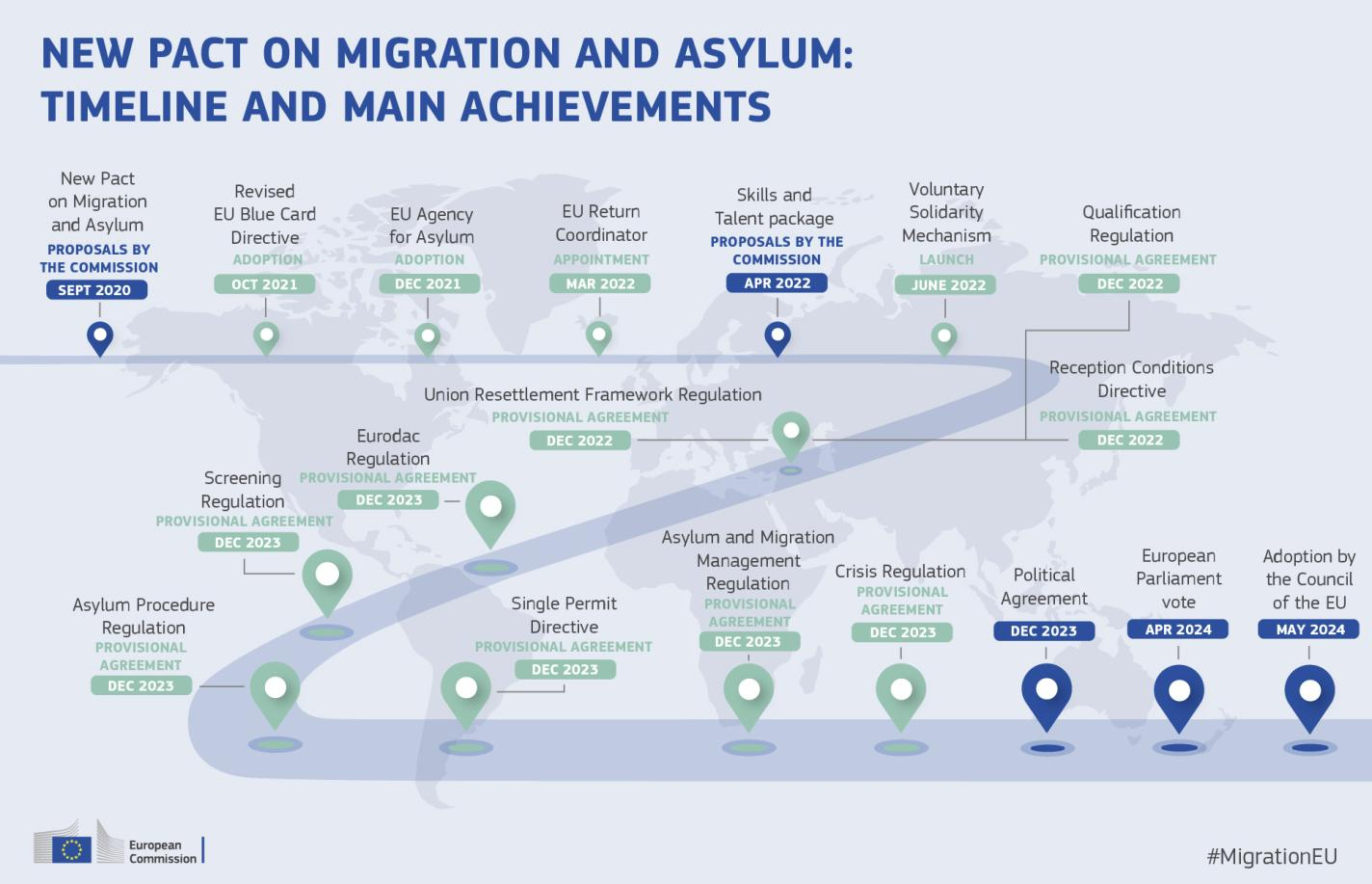
This visual displays the new European Union Pact on Migration and Asylum's timeline and main achievements.

The European Union interprets the safe third country concept vis-à-vis Article 38 of Directive 2013/32/EU and recently overhauled it by adopting the EU Pact on Migration and Asylum (and its Annex II: Regulation [EU] 2024/1348). The next review, due in 2025 by Article 77 of the Asylum Procedure Regulation, will look at the application of the concept and propose amendments if necessary.

The legal basis of safe third country policies has developed over the years. On an EU wide level, CEAS utilizes a similar safe third country principle to process asylum applications to avoid excessive pressure on national systems. Safe third country policies have been employed as political instruments to limit immigration. Within the EU, Germany codified the idea into its constitution with amendments passed in 1993 that designated all member states of the European Community as safe third countries. The United States also adopted safe third country agreements according to Section 208(a)(2)(A) of the 1952 Immigration and Nationality Act (INA), establishing a safe third country agreement with Canada in particular.

In international legal discussions related to safe third countries, the main two legal references are the Refugee Convention of 1951 and the principle of non-refoulement as enshrined in Article 33. Although the Convention itself does not provide explicit authorisation for safe third country policies, states have invariably invoked the legal permissibility of transferring asylum seekers as long as non-refoulement is complied with. However, some have contested this interpretation on human rights grounds, claiming that the state doing the transferring must be satisfied that the country to which the individual is sent is fully compliant with the rights and protections afforded to refugees under international law.

== Applicable laws and litigation ==
Internationally, the 1951 Refugee Convention is still the most significant legal document laying out the entitlements of refugees. Although the Convention does not contain a specific provision affirmatively endorsing safe third country transfers, it does contain obligations beyond those relating to non-refoulement, including ensuring that individuals transferred as refugees retain their acquired rights. International treaties such as the International Covenant on Civil and Political Rights (ICCPR) and the European Convention on Human Rights (ECHR) prohibit states from transferring asylum seekers to another state where they will face the risk of torture or inhumane treatment.

In the EU, however, the Dublin III Regulation holds a central position in defining safe third country practices. Dublin III was originally crafted to divide responsibility for asylum claims among member states; however, legal actions against the agreement have arisen due to uneven conditions of asylum in Europe. It assumes that all participating states provide sufficient protection, but cases like MSS v. Belgium and Greece have highlighted systemic shortcomings in some states. In that respect, both Bulgaria and Hungary have been under scrutiny due to their flawed asylum procedures, which have distorted the presumption of mutual trust that predicated Dublin III.

The Asylum Procedure Regulation (EU) 2024/1348 is the most recent reform to EU asylum law, with the goal of harmonizing application procedures. The 2025 review may lead to updates to address existing criticisms, particularly about procedural safeguards and the identification of safe third countries at the EU level. However 15 member states (Bulgaria, Czech Republic, Denmark, Estonia, Greece, Italy, Cyprus, Latvia, Lithuania, Malta, Netherlands, Austria, Poland, Romania, and Finland) have already expressed a desire for stricter enforcement of safe third countries, insisting on immediate measures that could limit access to asylum to a further degree.

=== By country ===
==== United States ====
The United States of America has used their Immigration and Nationality Act (NIA), section 208(a)(2)(A) of 1952 to exclude refugee and asylum applications where the safe third country concept applies. In 2002, the USA signed the Canada-United States Safe Third Country Agreement, which went into effect in 2004. Under this agreement, each party has a duty not to remove applicants transferred under the terms of the agreement "until an adjudication of the person's refugee status claim has been made."

As of 2019, further safe third country agreements with Mexico, Guatemala, El Salvador and Honduras have been initiated by the USA as a response to increased Central and South American asylum applications.

==== South Africa ====
In the case of South Africa, refugee protection is based on the 1998 Refugees Act. Though the Act does not include a safe third countries clause, the concept has still been applied by South Africa as precedent for rejecting applications without legal basis.

In 2011, South Africa added "advanced passenger processing" to its Immigration Act, which is argued as an incorporation of the safe third country concept. The Immigration Act's amendment implies that the states responsible for receiving and settling asylum seekers should be the ones neighbouring the country that the asylum seeker is fleeing, though, this contradicts extant international law on asylum.

== Effect on people seeking asylum ==
A common effect of the "safe third country" policy is to remove people from any prospect of seeking asylum, as they will not be recognized as refugees either in the country where they are or the transit country recognized as a "safe third country". People are put at risk of chain refoulment when they are removed from one country to another via a "safe third country" agreement, but that country either mistreats them or deports them their country of origin where they face persecution. For example, Tunisia is recognized as a safe third country by the EU, but its treatment of asylum seekers was described by the UN OHCHR as "brutal racism and arbitrary expulsions to dangerous conditions".

== Controversies and debates ==
The safe third country concept is the source of much controversy and debate, both legal and political. One of the key controversies is whether safe third country policies actually promote responsibility-sharing between states or merely shift the burden to less-developed states with less robust systems of asylum. Some critics have pointed out how the use of safe third country policies by the EU has exacerbated the burden on Eastern European frontline states, which largely lack the economic means and thus the systemic capacity for transit processing of refugees. Western European restrictions have resulted in an outsized influx of refugees to states like Croatia, fueling its ill-preparedness to process asylum claims.

== See also ==
- Human migration
- Asylum seeker
- Persecution
- Migration diplomacy
- Asylum shopping
- Treaty law
- Refugee law
- United Nations High Commissioner for Refugees (UNHCR)
- Migration and asylum policy of the European Union
- Immigration by country
- Immigration reform
