= Refugee roulette =

Randomness in the determination of refugee status

Refugee roulette refers to arbitrariness in the process of refugee status determinations or, as it is called in the United States, asylum adjudication. Recent research suggests that at least in the United States and Canada, the outcome of asylum determinations largely depends upon the identity of the particular adjudicator to whom an application is randomly assigned, and that the resulting disparities in rates of granting asylum are problematic "with some officers [immigration judges] granting asylum to no Chinese nationals, while other officers granted asylum in as many as 68% of their cases. Similarly, Colombian asylum applicants ... in Miami had a 5% chance of prevailing with one of that court’s judges and an 88% chance of prevailing before another judge in the same building." "In many cases, ... a clerk randomly assigns an application to a particular asylum officer or immigration judge." On the other hand, some commentators state that a good deal of disparity is inevitable and that refugees and their advocates must "learn to live" with "unequal justice". Others report that the amount of disparity diminished after 2008.

The original study that coined the term "refugee roulette" presents an empirical analysis of decision-making at all four levels of the asylum process, namely the asylum office of the Department of Homeland Security, the immigration courts of the Department of Justice, the Board of Immigration Appeals, and the United States Courts of Appeals, between 2000 and 2004. The authors argue that their findings reveal an unacceptable level of disparities in grant rates, noting that the asylum adjudicators studied heard large numbers of cases from the same country in the same location over the same period of time. The study concludes with recommendations for reforming the immigration adjudication system. In a 2008 study of immigration court decision-making between 1994 and 2007, the United States Government Accountability Office found that "the likelihood of being granted asylum varied considerably across and within the [immigration courts studied]."

The findings of the original "Refugee Roulette" study were reported as the lead story on the front page of The New York Times on May 31, 2007. The study was also reported in the Atlantic Monthly and many other media outlets, including the Atlanta Journal-Constitution, the Christian Science Monitor, the Dallas Morning News, and the Miami Herald. The study has been cited by numerous prominent legal academics, including Prof. David Cole of the Georgetown University Law Center, Judith Resnik, and Cass Sunstein. It was also discussed in a decision of the United States Court of Appeals for the Fourth Circuit. The study has been cited by the American Bar Association's Commission on Immigration and the Appleseed Foundation, among other organizations. A similar study of the Canadian asylum adjudication system was subsequently published.

The term "refugee roulette" continues to be used by the popular media to describe arbitrariness in asylum adjudication.

== See also ==
- Administrative law
- Asylum seekers
- Asylum shopping
- Refugee
- Refugee law
- Right of asylum
- Refugee employment
