= Dublin Regulation =

European Union (EU) law regarding political asylum

States applying Dublin instruments Dublin regulation EU-Denmark agreement non-EU member states with an agreement to apply the provisions

The Dublin Regulation (Regulation No. 604/2013; sometimes the Dublin III Regulation; previously the Dublin II Regulation and Dublin Convention) was a regulation of the European Union that determined which EU member state was responsible for the examination of an application for asylum, submitted by persons seeking international protection under the Geneva Convention and the Qualification Directive, within the European Union.

The Dublin Regulation formed a key part of the Common European Asylum System (CEAS). Together with the Eurodac Regulation, which establishes a Europe-wide fingerprinting database for unauthorised entrants to the EU, the Dublin Regulation formed the Dublin System. The Dublin Regulation aimed to "determine rapidly the Member State responsible [for an asylum claim]" and provides for the transfer of an asylum seeker to that Member State.

One of the principal aims of the Dublin Regulation was to prevent an applicant from submitting applications in multiple member states. Another aim was to reduce the number of "orbiting" asylum seekers, who are shuttled from member state to member state. The country in which the asylum seeker first applies for asylum is responsible for either accepting or rejecting the claim, and the seeker may not restart the process in another jurisdiction. Thus, all signatory member states to the Dublin Regulation are considered safe third countries.

As part of the third phase of CEAS, the Dublin III Regulation has been replaced by the Asylum and Migration Management Regulation (AMMR), which came into effect on 12 June 2026.

== History ==
The Dublin regime was originally established by the Dublin Convention, which was signed in Dublin, Ireland on 15 June 1990, and first came into force on 1 September 1997 for the first twelve signatories (Belgium, Denmark, France, Germany, Greece, Ireland, Italy, Luxembourg, the Netherlands, Portugal, Spain and the United Kingdom), on 1 October 1997 for Austria and Sweden, and on 1 January 1998 for Finland. While the convention was only open to accession by member states of the European Communities, Norway and Iceland, non-member states, concluded an agreement with the EC in 2001 to apply the provisions of the Convention in their territories.

=== Incorporation of the Dublin framework under EU law ===
The Dublin II Regulation was adopted in 2003, replacing the Dublin Convention in all EU member states except Denmark, which has an opt-out from implementing regulations under the area of freedom, security and justice. An agreement with Denmark on extending the application of the Regulation to Denmark came into force in 2006. A separate protocol also extended the Iceland-Norway agreement to Denmark in 2006. The provisions of the Regulation were also extended by a treaty to non-member states Switzerland on 1 March 2008, which on 5 June 2005 voted by 54.6% to ratify it, and Liechtenstein on 1 April 2011. A protocol subsequently made this agreement also applicable to Denmark.

=== Second phase of the Common European Asylum System ===
On 3 December 2008, the European Commission proposed amendments to the Dublin Regulation, creating an opportunity for reform of the Dublin System. The Dublin III Regulation (No. 604/2013) was approved in June 2013, replacing the Dublin II Regulation, and applies to all member states except Denmark. Denmark subsequently notified the EU that it would apply the amendments, by virtue of its bilateral agreement with the EU.

The recast regulation came into force on 19 July 2013. It is based on the same principle as the previous two, i.e., that the first Member State where fingerprints are stored or an asylum claim is lodged is responsible for a person's asylum claim.

In July 2017, the European Court of Justice upheld the Dublin Regulation, declaring that it still stands despite the high influx of 2015, giving EU member states the right to transfer migrants to the first country of entry to the EU.

The United Kingdom withdrawal from the European Union took effect at the end of the Brexit transition period on 31 December 2020, at which point the Regulation ceased to apply to it.

=== Asylum and Migration Management Regulation ===
The Dublin III Regulation was replaced by the Asylum and Migration Management Regulation, as part of the third phase of the Common European Asylum System. The Justice and Home Affairs Council reached an agreement on a negotiating position towards the European Parliament on 8 June 2023. The Pact was adopted by the European Council on 14 May 2024 and has come into force in 2026. The revised Regulation applies to all EU member states except those with opt-outs from the AFSJ policy area: Denmark and Ireland. Denmark subsequently notified the EU that it would apply the amendments on 11 June 2024, while Ireland's request to opt-in to the amendments was formally approved by the Commission in July 2024.

Key to the Asylum and Migration Management Regulation is the institution of a new solidarity mechanism between the member states. Solidarity can take the form of relocation of migrants, financial contributions, deployment of personnel or measures focusing on capacity building. Solidarity will be mandatory for member states, but the form of solidarity is at the discretion of the member states themselves. Per relocation, member states can instead make a financial contribution of €20.000. The updated rules on solidarity combine mandatory solidarity to assist member states dealing with a significant migrant influx with adaptable options for contributions. These contributions from member states may include relocating individuals, financial support, or, upon agreement with the recipient state, alternative measures of solidarity (such as supplying border personnel or aiding in establishing reception facilities).

== Criticism ==
According to the European Council on Refugees and Exiles (ECRE) and the UNHCR the current system fails to provide fair, efficient and effective protection. Around 2008, those refugees transferred under Dublin were not always able to access an asylum procedure. This put people at risk of being returned to persecution. The claim has been made on a number of occasions both by the ECRE and the UNHCR that the Dublin regulation impedes the legal rights and personal welfare of asylum seekers, including the right to a fair examination of their asylum claim and, where recognised, to effective protection, and leads to uneven distribution of asylum claims among Member States.

Application of this regulation can seriously delay the presentation of claims and can result in claims never being heard. Causes of concern include the use of detention to enforce transfers of asylum seekers from the state where they apply to the state deemed responsible, also known as Dublin transfers, the separation of families and the denial of an effective opportunity to appeal against transfers. The Dublin system also increases pressures on the external border regions of the EU, where the majority of asylum seekers enter EU and where states are often least able to offer asylum seekers support and protection.

After ECRE, the UNHCR and other non-governmental organisations openly criticised Greece's asylum system, including the lack of protection and care for unaccompanied children, several countries suspended transfers of asylum seekers to Greece under the Dublin II regulation. Norway announced in February 2008 that it would stop transferring any asylum seekers back to Greece under the Dublin II regulation. In September, it backtracked and announced that transfers to Greece would be based on individual assessments. In April 2008 Finland announced a similar move.

The regulation is also criticised by the Council of Europe Commissioner for Human Rights as undermining refugee rights.

The European Court of Human Rights in the case M.S.S. v Belgium and Greece, judged on 21 January 2011 that both the Greek and the Belgian governments violated the European Convention on Human Rights by applying the EU's own law on asylum seekers and were given fines of €6,000 and €30,000, respectively. Recently, voices have been heard calling for the imposition of tougher sanctions, should similar cases of trying to follow EU asylum laws occur in the future.

=== The case of Tarakhel vs. Switzerland ===
A Grand Chamber judgment in the European Court of Human Rights (ECHR) found that the Dublin Regulation had the potential to undermine the individual rights and safety of refugees. Golajan and Maryam Tarakhel fled Iran to Italy with their six children. After leaving Italy’s reception centre in Bari without permission, the family applied for asylum in first Austria and then Switzerland, but both countries applied for a transfer of control to the Italian authorities under the sovereignty clause in Article 3 of the Dublin Regulation, which allows countries to outsource application examinations. Tarakhel then went to talk to the Federal Migration Office to request Swiss asylum, but the office concluded that under the Dublin Regulation, Italy was responsible for deciding their case. The Tarakhel family appealed under Article 3 of the European Convention on Human Rights, saying that they would be subject to “inhuman and degrading treatment” should they be forced to return to Italy due to their “systemic deficiencies” in asylum management. They claimed that when taken in conjunction with Article 3, their rights under Article 13 of the Convention, which gives right to an effective remedy, are violated because the Swiss government did not take into account their situation as a family. In 2013, over 14,000 asylum application had been made to Italy for only 9,630 places. Since the Swiss Court did not have to ensure the safe reception of the eight-person family unit under the Dublin Regulation, the court found that there was a plausible reason for the family to fear their treatment in Italy. Additionally, the court believed that the presence of children, a “particularly underprivileged and vulnerable” demographic, meant that the governments should be even more careful in ensuring safe reception across borders. Their complaint under Article 13 was found to be manifestly ill-founded. The Grand Chamber concluded in a 14-3 decision that Switzerland must ensure safe asylum before deportation.

Switzerland is not a part of the European Union, but it did sign into the Schengen Zone, making it subject to the laws outlined in the Dublin Regulation. The Dublin Regulation, however, still upholds some aspects of EU Law. Since Switzerland also signed into the Council of Europe, they are beholden to the judgements of the ECHR. Therefore, the ECHR had to apply laws from the EU to a country that is not a part of the EU. In the dissenting opinion from the chamber judges, they write that it is outside of the scope of Swiss responsibilities to protect against potential future unsafe treatment, and they insist on instead putting any future burden on Italy. Their unclear assignment of blame exposes some discrepancies in the Convention of Human Rights as well as the Dublin Regulation.

== Dublin Regulation and the European refugees crisis ==
Around 23 June 2015 during the European refugee and migrant crisis, Hungary considered itself overburdened with asylum applications after receiving 60,000 "illegal immigrants" that year and announced to no longer receive back applicants who had crossed the borders to other EU countries and were detained there, as they should according to the Dublin regulation, due to unspecified "technical reasons", thus practically withdrawing from that Dublin regulation. On 24 August 2015, Germany therefore decided to make use of the "sovereignty clause" to process Syrian asylum applications for which it would not be responsible under the criteria of the Regulation. On 2 September 2015, the Czech Republic also decided to offer Syrian refugees who had already applied for asylum in other EU countries and who had reached the country to either have their application processed in the Czech Republic (i. e. get asylum there) or to continue their journey elsewhere.

States such as Hungary, Slovakia and Poland also officially stated their opposition to any possible revision or enlargement of the Dublin Regulation, specifically referring to the eventual introduction of new mandatory or permanent quotas for solidarity measures.

In April 2018 at a public meeting of the Interior-Committee of the German Bundestag, expert witness Kay Hailbronner asked about a future European asylum system, and described the current state of the Dublin Regulation as dysfunctional. Hailbronner concluded, that once the EU has been reached, travelling to the desired destination, where the chances for being granted full refugee status are best and better living conditions are expected, was common practice. Sanctions for such travel were practically non-existent. Even if already deported, a return to the desired nation could be organized.

In 2019, the European Union (EU) Member States sent out 142 494 outgoing requests to transfer the responsibility to examine an asylum application and effectively implemented 23 737 outgoing transfers to other Member States. The largest numbers of outgoing requests using the Dublin procedure were sent by Germany (48 844), France (48 321), each representing close to one-third of the total number of outgoing requests recorded in 2019. They were followed by Belgium (11 882) and the Netherlands (9 267). These four Member States together sent more than four-fifths (83%) of all outgoing requests in 2019.

In September 2024, with some 242,000 migrants obligated to leave the country, the German government announced the reintroduction of border controls to its European neighbours in an attempt to turn back new arrivals. Nathan Giwerzew described the Dublin III regulation in that context as "dysfunctional" - migrants who arrive in Europe are usually not registered by the country they first reach and are just waved through to Germany. And with no prior registration, they cannot be returned. Of the 128,000 migrants, caught by German police near the borders in 2023, only 7.9% had been registered before by another European country and the fingerprints of the rest could not be found in the Eurodac database. The attempt by the German government to return asylum seekers to the European neighbors, whose territory the migrants had crossed to enter Germany, was declared illegal by the Verwaltungsgericht Berlin on 2 June 2025. Three Somali migrants, who had been sent back to Poland after having crossed into Germany in Frankfurt (Oder) in May 2025, had filed an urgent appeal with the help of Pro Asyl activists.

During 3 years of the Meloni government, up to August 2026, the Italian government had taken back 15 migrants from Germany who had been registered in Italy before. In the same time, the German government had requested Italy to take back around 35,000 Dublin-cases.

== See also ==
- Asylum shopping
- Child migration
- European Convention on Nationality
- List of international and European law on child protection and migration
- Refugee law
- Schengen area
- Transnational child protection
- Unaccompanied minor
