= Cartagena Declaration on Refugees =

Non-binding Latin American document

The Cartagena Declaration on Refugees, or just Cartagena Declaration, is a non-binding document for the protection of refugees adopted in 1984 by delegates from ten Latin-American countries: Belize, Colombia, Costa Rica, El Salvador, Guatemala, Honduras, Mexico, Nicaragua, Panama, and Venezuela. It has since been incorporated into the national laws and state practices of 14 countries.

The declaration is the result of the Colloquium on International Protection for Refugees and Displaced Persons in Central America, Mexico and Panama, which was held in Cartagena, Colombia, from 19 to 22 November 1984. The declaration was influenced by the Contadora Act on Peace and Cooperation, which itself was based on the 1951 Refugee Convention and the 1967 Protocol.

The declaration reaffirms the importance of the right of asylum, the principle of non-refoulement, and the significance of finding durable solutions.

== Impact ==
=== Extended refugee definition ===
Compared to the 1951 Convention and the 1967 Protocol, the Cartagena Declaration allows a broader category of persons in need of international protection to be considered as refugees. The declaration, in Conclusion III, adds five situational events to the definition of the 1951 Convention and the 1967 Protocol. Similar additions were made in the 1969 Refugee Convention, but the Cartagena Declaration has further extended them. Refugees are those:

persons who have fled their country because their lives, security or freedom have been threatened by generalized violence, foreign aggression, internal conflicts, massive violation of human rights or other circumstances which have seriously disturbed public order".

This definition allows a broader temporal and geographical scope for the risks refugees find themselves in and additionally covers some of the indirect effects such as poverty, economic decline, inflation, violence, disease, food insecurity, malnourishment, displacement, and climate change.

=== Improved cooperation between countries ===
The Cartagena Declaration was the beginning of an ongoing forum between Latin American countries. Since 1984, its signatories have met every ten years, and they have extended its reach to include Caribbean nations. Three successor declarations have been made: the 1994 San José Declaration, the 2004 Mexico Declaration, and the 2014 Brazil Declaration (with 28 countries and three territories in Latin America and the Caribbean).

=== First application ===
On 24 July 2019, Brazil applied the criteria in the expanded definition of a refugee as set forth by the Cartagena Declaration on Refugees to accept the petitions for refugee cases by 174 Venezuelans. The UNHCR praised Brazil for this significant advancement for the protection of Venezuelans forced to leave their country.

The decision was made possible by the National Refugee Committee's recognition, on 14 June, that an objective situation of serious and widespread violation of human rights in Venezuela existed. This enabled over 100,000 refugee petitions to begin to be processed for asylum in Brazil.

As of 6 December 2019, around 21,000 Venezuelans had received immediate relief on the basis of this recognition.
