= Treaty on Political Asylum and Refuge =

1939 multilateral asylum and refugee treaty

The Treaty on Political Asylum and Refuge is a multi-party treaty regarding political asylum and refugee law. It was signed in Montevideo on 4 August 1939 and entered into force on 29 December 1954.

The treaty builds upon the Treaty on International Penal Law, adopted by the First South American Congress on Private International Law in Montevideo on 23 January 1889, incorporating doctrines already accepted due to situations which had occurred since between 1889 and 1939.

== Member states ==
In order of appearance in the treaty preamble:

- Peru
- Argentina
- Uruguay
- Bolivia
- Paraguay
- Chile
