= Return to Nepal Initiative =

The Return to Nepal Initiative (RNI; Nepali: नेपाल फर्कौं महाअभियान) is an initiative to encourage the Nepali diaspora to return to Nepal. RNI, who is globally coordinated by Dr. Rajendra Pangeni from the USA, tries to bring returnees together, bridging between Nepalese citizens who want to return to those who have returned and are working in similar sectors.
