= Voluntary return =

Return of a migrant to their country of origin

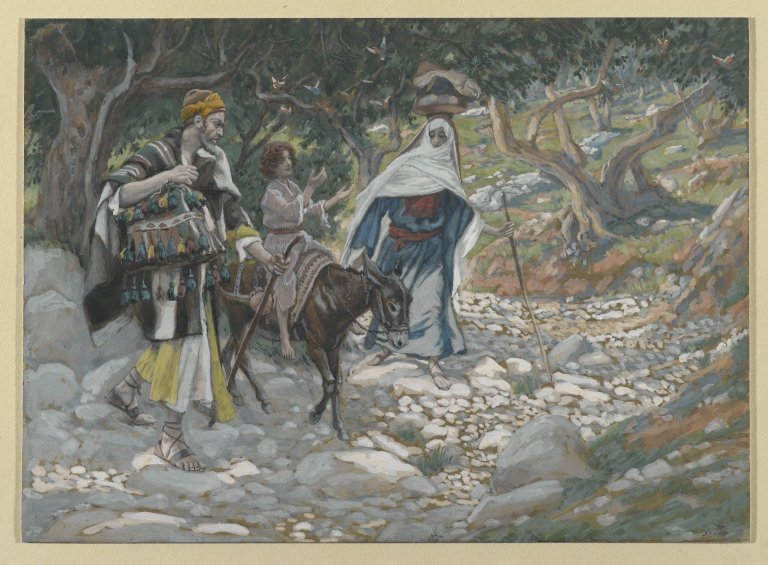
In The Return from Egypt by James Tissot, Jesus, Mary, and Joseph voluntarily leave Egypt to go to Nazareth after King Herod's death.

Voluntary return or voluntary repatriation is the return of a migrant such as undocumented immigrants, rejected asylum seekers, refugees, unaccompanied minors, as well as second-generation immigrants who, of their own free-will, make the decision to return to their country of origin or homeland when they are unable or unwilling to remain in their host country, for a variety of possible reasons, from conflicting cultural values to deteriorating conditions.

== Overview ==
The terms are used in slightly different contexts and can refer to:

- The voluntary return of asylum seekers who no longer wish to wait for a decision on their asylum application or otherwise changed their mind and want to go back to their country of origin.
- Destitute migrants, such as the homeless, who cannot afford the journey back home. Some homelessness charities provide funding for these journeys.
- The "voluntary" return of rejected asylum seekers or irregular migrants to their countries of origin. Leaving voluntarily in such case may be fairly euphemistic, as the alternative is often immigration detention and eventual deportation.
- The most preferred of the UNHCR's three durable solutions for refugees is return, because it is what most refugees seek. Once the reasons for displacement or fleeing have been resolved and it is once again safe to live in the country of origin, refugees are free to return to their country of origin. Returnees remain a concern to the UNHCR and as such are under its legal protection. The UNHCR monitors returnee operations and provides support for the returnees even after their arrival and return to in their countries of origin.

Some voluntary return programs offer assisted voluntary return (AVR) and some voluntary return is spontaneous and independent without assistance.

== Conventions on Voluntary return of refugees ==
=== In Africa ===
==== Legal basis ====
The concept of voluntary repatriation was first developed in the 1969 Convention Governing the Specific Aspects of Refugee Problems in Africa. It was agreed that:

"The sending state, in collaboration with the receiving state, must make adequate arrangements for the safe return of refugees who request repatriation, while the country of origin must facilitate their resettlement and grant them the full rights and privileges of nationals of the country, and subject them to the same obligations."

==== Controversies ====
- The UNHCR and the hosting countries usually encourage refugees to return voluntarily. The 1969 Refugee Convention stipulates that the countries of origin should facilitate repatriation, by using the media as well as Organisation of African Unity, in order to invite refugees to return . In turn, the host countries are expected to disseminate such information and ensure it is received. However, reports of the improved stability and circumstances in the country of origin may be exaggerated, blurred or untrue and refugees may be encouraged to return before the dangers have fully removed.
- As refugees are protected from deportation (or refoulement) by the 1951 Refugee Convention, some countries may pressure them to leave by gradually decreasing refugees' standard of living, as well as running propaganda campaigns to agitate the host population against them through fears of domination or loss of privilege. This is similar to self-deportation.
- In some countries, the IOM's programmes of "voluntary assisted returns" have been criticized. The "voluntary" nature of these returns, put forward in the media coverage of IOM interventions is considered to be questionable in places such as Libya. According to the UNHCR, "voluntariness is more than an issue of principle" . If refugee's rights are not recognized and enforced, if they are subject to pressures and restrictions such as confinement to isolated camps, they may choose to return, but this is not "an act of free will".
- Some countries offer financial support to refugees and rejected asylum seekers in order to facilitate the process of starting a new life in their country of origin. This could be considered as residency buyouts.

==== Support offered ====
The UNHCR and the IOM offer assistance to refugees who want to return voluntarily and to other people in need of support for returning to their home countries. This includes administrative, logistical, financial and reintegration support. Many developed countries also provide assistance and voluntary return programs independent from the IOM and the UNHCR. Support includes arrangement and payment for returning travels. Support may also include financial support so that returnees can make sustainable investments and rebuild their lives again, and connecting people with networks and groups in the country of origin so that they will get support from local organizations.

Upon enrolling in assisted voluntary return programs (AVR), the applicant is forfeits their claim as a refugee or asylum-seeker. Many times this includes a five-year travel ban restricting the individual from returning to the host country, similar to deportation. According to interviews with IOM workers and files on return migrants who took part in their program, it is not uncommon for return migrants to feel pressured into applying to AVR programs due to financial hardships, lack of employment, and fear of deportation.

== Government policies and incentives ==
=== Europe ===
Belgium – Return and Emigration of Asylum Seekers Ex Belgium programme: This program is open to asylum seekers and third-country nationals who want to return to their country of origin or to voluntarily emigrate to a third world country. As this program is voluntary, one can retract their application if ever they change their mind. Applicants are offered travel support, including counselling prior to departure, assistance during their flight and travel cost. Applicants are also offered some monetary compensation to get them to their home from the airport. Financial support is also offered to aid in the reintegration process, partially funded by the European Return Fund.

Denmark – with a history of financially incentivising the voluntary return of immigrants, Denmark raised the amount to 100,000 kroner per person (around €13,000 EUR or US$20,000) in 2009. Peter Skaarup, deputy leader of the Danish People's Party, explained the scheme was aimed at immigrants from outside the EU and non-Nordic nations, targeting "nationals from non-Western countries who are struggling to adapt to Danish society". The Danish government also allocated 20 million kroner for city councils, to "motivate foreigners to return home".

France – from 2005 around 3,000 immigrant families were paid to voluntarily leave France. By 2007, under newly elected President Nicolas Sarkozy, the French government started an enhanced scheme offering €6,000 per immigrant family to return to their country of origin. Brice Hortefeux, Immigration Minister, stated that France "must increase this measure to help voluntary return". In 2016, in response to the European migrant crisis, the government had rapidly risen the offer from €350 to €2,500 per individual. In 2017, Interior Minister Gerard Collomb reconfirmed the commitment to raise the monetary offer for immigrants to leave France.

Germany – with 35,000 voluntary returns in 2015, Germany allocated an extra €150 million over three years for migrants willing to return to their homelands. The policy saw an increase to 55,000 repatriations in the first year. In February 2017, under the 'Starthilfe Plus' scheme, immigrants were offered up to €1,000 each, or €3,000 to families, to leave the country and withdraw applications for asylum or residency. As of October 2017, 8,639 immigrants had returned home via the government program. In December 2017, under the slogan "Your country. Your future. Now!", the German government began offering grants for new kitchens and bathrooms, as well as one year's worth of paid rent, in the country of origin of an immigrant choosing to return home.

Ireland – in 2009, the Republic of Ireland government began offering repatriations grants to immigrants from nations outside the European Union to return home. The move was motivated by the Irish economic recession, with the EU-funded project attempting to "persuade foreign workers and asylum seekers to return to their country of origin".

Italy – in 2013, the Italian government offered African migrants, mainly from Ghana, Libya and Togo, up to €500 to leave the country and travel onwards to Germany, France or northern European nations. Detlef Scheele, Hamburgs social affairs minister, dealing with multiple arrivals from Italy, declared that the immigrants had "no legal right to stay" and would return to Italy or back to their home countries.

Norway – in 2016 the Norwegian government offered the first 500 asylum seekers to take a 10,000 kroner "bonus" to leave the country voluntarily, in addition to the 20,000 kroner already offered per person. Sylvi Listhaug, Integration Minister of Norway, claimed the move might "entice" immigrants to "voluntarily travel back by giving them a bit more money on their way out".

Spain – in 2008, struggling from recession and with unemployment towards 30%, the Spanish government proposed a 'Voluntary Return Plan'. Mainly targeting immigrants from South America, the Spanish labour ministry identified around 100,000 individuals from 19 countries which would be eligible for the scheme. In 2011, Anna Terrón, Secretary of State for Immigration, claimed the scheme "helps everyone if those who want to return to their country of origin are able to."

Sweden – in August 2007, the Swedish government began offering asylum seekers who were rejected permanent residency the equivalent of £3,500 per immigrant for a voluntary return to their country of origin. This resulted in a record 4,542 immigrants taking part in the scheme, and returning home in the first 8 months of 2016.

Switzerland – the Swiss government, following in the footsteps of Denmark, began a policy of confiscating any property of illegal immigrants with a value over 1,000 Swiss francs. However, the 2016 policy included an incentive for migrants to return to their country of origin, with the SEM stating that "if someone leaves voluntarily within seven months this person can get the money back and take it with them."

Turkey –Through Türkiye's National Assisted Voluntary Return Mechanism led by the Presidency of Migration Management, individuals who decide to return to their countries of origin receive return counselling, cash support, assistance with travel arrangements, and in-kind and cash reintegration support, while the process is implemented in cooperation with relevant public institutions and international partners to ensure that decisions are made freely and in accordance with human rights standards.

United Kingdom – in 2006, asylum seekers and illegal immigrants were offered up to £3,000 per individual to leave the country. Job training, education as well as travel costs were included in the scheme, with an expected uptake of 3,000 people, costing the British taxpayer an estimated £6.2 million. By 2010, the annual cost had risen to £16 million, with Immigration Minister Damian Green announcing a reduction from the 5-year delay on re-entry applications, to further incentivise quick voluntary repatriations.

- Assisted Voluntary Return for Families and Children: This program is open to non-European people with children and lone migrant children. They are given a cash grant of £500 to relocate and £2,000 to reintegrate to their communities per person. One can apply to this scheme before their asylum claim has been rejected.
- Assisted Voluntary Return of Irregular Migrants: This program provides help to illegal immigrants and immigrants who have overstayed to return to their country of origin. They are not offered monetary assistance.
- Facilitated Returns Scheme: This aids foreign national prisoners, once they have completed their sentence they are given £500 cash and a reintegration package of £3,000. If they leave before the end of their sentence they can receive up to £2,000 more.
- Positive Futures Project: This project is offered to young unaccompanied adults. After applying to an assisted voluntary return program, they can receive training to develop skills and gain additional education to help them build a home and have a career in the country they are returning to.
- Voluntary Assisted Return and Reintegration Programme: One can receive maximum £1,500 per person relocating to their home country. This program aids applicants with travel documents and booking flight.

=== North America ===
Canada – the Canadian government opted to not renew their 'Assisted Voluntary Return and Reintegration' pilot program in early 2015, after an evaluation by the Canada Border Services Agency. The program sought to reduce the number of failed asylum appeals and incentivize voluntarily leaving the country, but did not achieve all its objectives.

United States – in 2018, the American government announced the end of temporary protected status (TPS) for 200,000 Salvadoran immigrants. The decision, implemented by President Donald Trump, gave an 18-month period for immigrants to find a legal route to staying in the U.S. or to return to their country of origin. The termination of TPS came into effect on September 9, 2019, granting immigrants a grace period for voluntarily repatriation, before facing deportation beyond that date.

=== Rest of world ===
Israel – the Israeli government withhold 20 percent of asylum seekers' wages, in an attempt to encourage individuals to leave the country, where they will have access to the funds upon return to their homeland. The scheme was launched from May 2016, and currently applies to asylum seekers from Sudan and Eritrea.

Japan – after the 2008 financial crisis, Japan initiated a policy of paying unemployed workers to leave the country, mainly targeting the Latin American Dekasegi population for voluntary return. The incentivised scheme offered $3,000 (USD), plus $2,000 per dependent, and came with additional clauses that children of the returnee (second-generation immigrants) would not be able to later emigrate to Japan regardless of circumstance.

== UNHCR refugee return statistics ==
Voluntary return movements of refugees between 2014 and 1998
End-year	1998	2000	2002	2004	2006	2008	2010	2012	2014
Returned refugees	1,016,400	767,500	2,426,000	1,434,400	733,700	603,800	197,700	525,900	126,800

Voluntary return movements of refugees by country between 2014 and 2010
Returning from	Returning to	2014		2013		2012		2011		2010	
Returning from	Returning to	Total	UNHCR assisted	Total	UNHCR assisted	Total	UNHCR assisted	Total	UNHCR assisted	Total	UNHCR assisted
Afghanistan	India	210	160	120	70	110	50				
Afghanistan	Iran	4,510	4,510	8,250	8,250	15,040	15,040	18,850	18,850	8,490	8,490
Afghanistan	Pakistan	12,990	12,260	31,220	30,390	83,420	80,000	52,100	49,160	109,380	109,380
Angola	Botswana			430	430						
Angola	Congo	180	180			190	190				
Angola	DRC	12,480	12,480			15,570	15,570	1,540	1,540		
Angola	Namibia					2,810	2,810				
Angola	Zambia	1,620	1,620	1,160	1,160	1,090	980	2,370	2,370	400	400
Bosnia	Germany									180	0
Bosnia	Sweden									200	0
Burundi	DRC	900	900	1,500	1,500	480	480	3,940	3,940	3,640	3,640
Burundi	Kenya	290	290								
Burundi	Tanzania			510	510	35,200	35,200	340	340	1,010	1,010
Cameroon	Nigeria	390	390								
CAR	Cameroon					350	350	2,500	2,500		
CAR	Chad					1,970	1,970	6,470	6,470		
Chad	Cameroon			380	380	1,710	1,710				
Chad	CAR	270	270								
Congo	Gabon							710	710		
Côte d'Ivoire	Benin			100	100	110	110				
Côte d'Ivoire	Guinea			390	390						
Côte d'Ivoire	Liberia	12,210	12,200	18,720	18,270	71,990	7,110	135,110	135,110		
Côte d'Ivoire	Mali					160	160				
Côte d'Ivoire	Togo			660	660	460	410				
Croatia	Bosnia	160	160					230	230	400	110
Croatia	Serbia	120	120	410	410			200	200		
DRC	Burundi			290	290	260	260	490	490	1,100	1,100
DRC	CAR	6,970	6,970	310	10	790	0	11,640	0		
DRC	Congo	10,070	10,070	62,870	62,870	46,390	46,390	760	20		
DRC	South Sudan	2,510	2,510								
DRC	Sudan			4,470	0	2,440	0				
DRC	Uganda	5,540	5,540	320	10	21,910	10	7,990	0	6,180	10
DRC	Tanzania							100	100		
DRC	Zambia			130	130					9,270	9,270
Ethiopia	South Sudan	440	440								
Iraq	Austria	360	360								
Iraq	Egypt	100	100								
Iraq	France	100	100								
Iraq	Germany	320	320								
Iraq	Greece	450	450								
Iraq	Indonesia	960	960								
Iraq	Iran	280	280								
Iraq	Italy	350	350								
Iraq	Jordan	750	750								
Iraq	Kazakhstan	2,310	2,310								
Iraq	Lebanon	110	110								
Iraq	Libya	240	240								
Iraq	New Zealand	370	370								
Iraq	Norway	250	250								
Iraq	Syria	1,960	1,960								
Iraq	Turkey	120	120								
Iraq	UAE	430	430								
Iraq	UK	740	740								
Iraq	various/unknown			60,880	48,190	82,270	40,460	67,090	67,090	28,820	25,180
Kenya	Uganda									320	320
Liberia	Côte d'Ivoire					17,590	17,590	1,170	1,170	920	920
Liberia	Gambia					330	330				
Liberia	Ghana					4,710	4,710	470	470	180	180
Liberia	Guinea					5,550	5,550			120	120
Liberia	Nigeria					170	170				
Liberia	Sierra Leone					1,030	1,030				
Libya	Tunisia					1,050	0	148,950	0		
Mali	Algeria	2,370	2,370	920	0						
Mali	Burkina Faso	7,740	7,740	3,760	110						
Mali	Mauritania	4,550	4,550	3,900	2,050						
Mali	Niger	6,300	6,300	5,690	2,760						
Mauritania	Senegal					6,210	6,210	1,370	1,370	1,390	1,390
Myanmar	Thailand			3,000	0						
Pakistan	Afghanistan							3,450	0		
Rwanda	DRC	5,650	5,650	7,200	7,200	10,780	10,780	8,350	8,350	10,810	10,810
Rwanda	Uganda			410	410	380	380				
Serbia	Macedonia							250	210	160	150
Serbia	Montenegro	130	130			120	120			200	200
Somalia	Ethiopia			4,480	0						
Somalia	Ethiopia	490	490	28,830	0						
Somalia	Sudan			130	0						
Somalia	Yemen	1,990	0	2,620	30			110	110		
South Sudan	Israel					330	160				
South Sudan	Uganda			280	280	1,910	1,910	890	890		
Sri Lanka	India	500	400	910	710	1,450	1,260	2,310	1,670	5,040	5,040
Sudan	Chad	13,110	13,110	16,940	16,940	17,660	17,660	30,890	14,670	4,000	0
Sudan	Egypt					150	150	140	120	250	250
Sudan	Ethiopia							270	270		
Sudan	Israel							100	100		
Sudan	Libya							17,820	17,820		
Sudan	Uganda					1,670	1,670	810	810	2,670	2,670
Syria	Turkey			140,760	0	68,570	0				
Togo	Benin							100	100		
Turkey	Iraq									240	0
Zimbabwe	South Africa									100	60

== Voluntary return of other migrants ==
=== Voluntary return statistics ===
Voluntary returns via IOM AVRR between 2014 and 2010
Country/Territory	departed from country/territory				returned to country/territory			
Country/Territory	2011	2012	2013	2014	2011	2012	2013	2014
Afghanistan		17			834	2,019	1,624	1,304
Albania	2				85	330	326	1,239
Algeria					118	176	140	41
Angola					108	69	69	76
Antigua and Barbuda						1		1
Argentina			2	3	123	140	77	89
Armenia					504	532	448	435
Australia	478	428	699	800		2	24	2
Austria	2,880	2,601	2,896	2,299	1	1	2	7
Azerbaijan					180	220	216	249
Bahamas							5	1
Bahrain						1		
Bangladesh					126	1,208	2,000	1,334
Barbados							10	1
Belarus	88				281	269	188	159
Belgium	3,358	4,694	4,388	3,459	2	5	1	1
Belize					2	1		1
Benin		200	9	3	7	19	73	19
Bermuda							4	
Bhutan					2			1
Bolivia					300	256	225	183
Bosnia and Herzegovina	164				221	500	935	1,511
Botswana					1	8	12	3
Brazil					1,903	1,802	1,418	881
Bulgaria	67	51	147	330	76	90	82	75
Burkina Faso					21	46	208	91
Burundi					103	133	34	29
Cambodia			8	3	15	30	64	30
Cameroon			5	2	111	90	159	345
Canada		862	2,024	1,244		13	67	27
Cape Verde					18	19	25	25
CAR						1		1
Chad					16	94	23	15
Chile					113	183	169	120
China			1		873	674	657	519
Colombia					207	346	320	293
Comoros						5	2	6
Congo					26	14	26	74
DRC					82	187	109	96
Costa Rica		93		2	12	9	1	7
Ivory Coast					154	81	215	316
Croatia					42	76	140	120
Cuba					13	9	15	20
Czech Republic	202	223	146	173	7	60	82	64
Denmark	64	66	219	110	8	19	2	3
Dominican Republic	1,209			1	71	81	39	34
Ecuador				2	752	780	356	276
Egypt	54	296	185	173	93	221	366	501
El Salvador				2	19	47	90	79
Equatorial Guinea					4	3	1	2
Eritrea					11	13	11	13
Estonia	8	29	17	23	8	11	6	9
Eswatini							3	2
Ethiopia					1,127	1,515	542	1,610
Fiji					16	10	11	16
Finland	304	327	342	318		1		
France		6	3	8	6	11	10	8
Gabon					2			1
Gambia					56	221	300	76
Georgia		4			595	706	1,157	1,874
Germany	6,319	7,546	10,251	13,574	16	22	9	6
Ghana		17	10		226	324	355	222
Greece	760	7,290	9,325	7,357	3	8	7	15
Grenada							2	1
Guatemala				2	19	28	28	25
Guinea		102	13	12	161	142	244	270
Guinea-Bissau					15	55	68	33
Guyana					4	1	3	2
Haiti					1,211	67	5	1
Honduras			3		35	73	95	113
Hong Kong			37	11	4	4	6	9
Hungary	365	414	353	491	30	347	1,099	517
India				68	515	415	604	530
Indonesia	297		955	561	175	145	184	139
Iran					431	550	1,346	1,219
Iraq					2,667	2,472	1,930	1,280
Ireland	402	359	340	188	10	19	15	12
Israel					39	33	64	15
Italy	506	848	993	867	26	17	7	21
Jamaica					14	17	13	17
Japan			4	7	2	4	7	2
Jordan			2	5	51	66	68	99
Kazakhstan					58	207	182	147
Kenya		543		1	53	75	68	48
Kiribati							1	
South Korea				2	41	16	45	57
Kosovo					1,569	1,334	1,542	1,546
Kuwait						1	2	2
Kyrgyzstan					80	119	123	81
Laos				1		4	1	2
Latvia	73	89	82	94	2	5	5	16
Lebanon					103	95	60	143
Liberia					19	15	34	18
Libya		172	847	218	27	50	80	82
Liechtenstein								5
Lithuania	47	65	43	66	12	11	4	15
Luxembourg	101	97	116	186				
Macau			7					
Macedonia					1,961	1,872	2,526	2,387
Madagascar					5	9	1	15
Malawi					38	3	15	12
Malaysia		36	23	11	44	42	20	21
Mali		21	8	7	55	32	173	126
Malta	29	39	55	72		1		3
Mauretania		1			8	18	35	14
Mauritius		23	23		77	37	58	31
Mexico	1,141	897	17	25	20	190	56	45
Moldova	38	73	10		248	199	213	149
Mongolia			1	4	632	527	458	541
Montenegro					26	127	83	174
Morocco	440	89	498	1,158	135	523	482	416
Mozambique					12	11	9	7
Myanmar			1		15	48	72	137
Namibia					2	2	34	17
Nepal					147	202	205	136
Nauru		50	17	46				
Netherlands	3,473	2,905	2,489	2,269	11	10	8	5
New Zealand					2	3	3	2
Nicaragua	12	13		4	14	23	25	35
Niger	78		82	6	15	48	31	30
Nigeria		2			623	689	914	609
Norway	1,813	1,753	1,899	1,622	5	4		14
Oman							1	
Pakistan					586	4,324	5,606	3,860
Palestinian territories					84	60	41	21
Panama			1	1	5	7	3	3
Papua New Guinea	5	3	177	278	31	2	2	13
Paraguay			4		74	60	49	75
Peru			2	3	149	149	183	207
Philippines				1	92	132	244	198
Poland	1,149	753	1,949	1,463	34	65	52	44
Portugal	594	753	692	412	2	3	15	16
Puerto Rico								1
Qatar								1
Réunion					1			
Romania	131	312	197	113	198	168	140	776
Russia	12	117	10		2,561	2,607	5,048	4,538
Rwanda					32	40	35	21
Saint Kitts and Nevis							1	
Saint Lucia				1		13	39	23
Saint Vincent and the Grenadines							52	12
Samoa					1	4	1	1
São Tomé and Príncipe					16	23	14	7
Saudi Arabia					1	4	5	
Senegal		1	1		124	201	328	283
Serbia					2,921	3,917	3,933	4,570
Seychelles					1	1	1	
Sierra Leone		6			25	29	37	23
Singapore					3	4	1	11
Slovakia	95	54	50	57	51	141	181	188
Slovenia	11	11	20	16	11	10		1
Solomon Islands					1			1
Somalia		990			1	1,005	14	13
South Africa	197	247			48	36	20	38
South Sudan					15	120	74	
Spain	823	785	758	889	14	12	9	21
Sri Lanka			1		205	847	409	374
Sudan					66	276	161	216
Suriname					32	46	56	58
Sweden	78	98	98	63	8	14	12	10
Switzerland	1,130	2,289	1,655	478		5		3
Syria					77	13		
Taiwan						1		4
Tajikistan					74	45	49	77
Tanzania	912			589	58	47	50	35
Thailand			49	13	25	17	24	22
East Timor		1					1	
Togo		183	2	5	21	26	74	31
Tonga					6		2	1
Trinidad and Tobago				4		8	5	
Tunisia		9	251	99	278	451	609	139
Turkey	200	569	618	495	384	371	256	276
Turkmenistan					18	89	74	4
Turks and Caicos						3		
Uganda					47	62	51	70
Ukraine	159	72	21		699	677	789	970
UAE			7			1	8	2
UK	874			2	53	41	59	50
United States					76	137	32	41
Uruguay					107	39	42	33
Uzbekistan					148	200	159	190
Vanuatu					1			5
Venezuela					34	34	45	34
Vietnam			1		371	215	251	179
Yemen	128	794	335	827	11	40	46	29
Zambia		34			20	8	4	4
Zimbabwe					90	35	5	12

== See also ==
- Right of return
