= New Pact on Migration and Asylum =

2024 European Union agreement

The New Pact on Migration and Asylum, also known as the EU Migration Pact or the EU Asylum and Migration Pact, is a set of new European Union rules concerning migration that took effect on 12 June 2026. It compels member states to more evenly share the cost and efforts of hosting migrants and reform European Union asylum and border security procedures, among other provisions.

== Legislative process ==
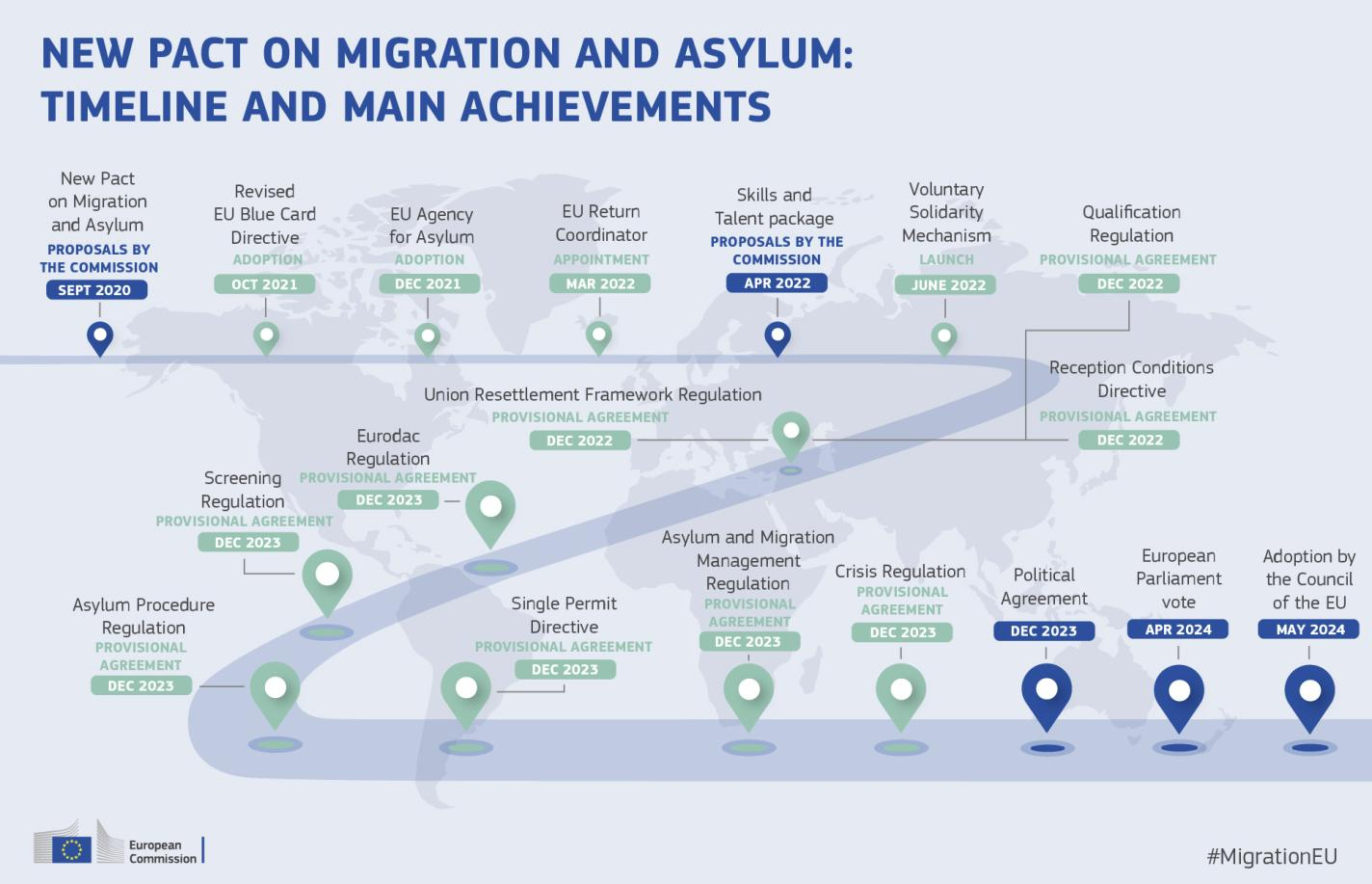
Timeline of the Pact, legislative process from the initial proposal in September 2020 to its final adoption in May 2024.

The European Commission initially proposed the Pact on 23 September 2020. The deal was agreed to on 20 December 2023 between representatives of the elected European Parliament and the Council of the European Union, made up of EU government ministers.

It passed the European Parliament on 10 April 2024, with narrow margins of around 30 votes on some provisions. The Council of the European Union approved the Pact on 14 May 2024, with Hungary and Poland voting against it.

== Provisions ==
The provisions of the Pact apply to migrants caught illegally crossing an external EU border, such as those reaching the shores of Greece, Italy or Spain via the Mediterranean Sea or Atlantic Ocean on boats provided by smugglers; estimated at around 300,000 migrants in 2023. Provisions do not apply to legal migrants to the EU (~3.5 million in 2023) and migrants who arrived legally but overstayed their visas (~700,000 in 2023).

The Pact mandates that the same procedures and procedural standards apply to all asylum applicants across EU member states. The Pact stipulates that migrants illegally entering the EU undergo identity, health and security checks, including biometric readings of faces and fingerprints, within seven days, with information stored on the newly created Eurodac database. The outcome of screening is either an application for international protection such as asylum, or deportation.

People seeking asylum have to apply in the EU nation they first enter and remain there until the country responsible for their application is determined. Asylum seekers from countries whose nationals' applications are approved less than 20% of the time will be fast-tracked in detention centers close to EU borders. This procedure should be done in 12 weeks, including time for one legal appeal if an asylum application is rejected, with a possible extension of eight weeks. Migrants from countries with higher acceptance rates will be able to pass through the regular asylum procedure, which will be shortened from its current length of years. A deportation issue is set to be issued automatically if an asylum request is refused. The Pact allows for the speedier deportation of people to countries of origin or transit, if these have been declared safe.

The Dublin III Regulation, which determines which member state is responsible for processing any individual asylum application, is therefore reformed. Countries where migrants first arrive are able to relocate a total of up to 30,000 migrants per year to other EU member states. The Pact institutes a "mandatory solidarity mechanism" where all EU countries must either physically host asylum seekers, or assist in other ways such as financially or by providing extra personnel. A country can pay 20,000 Euros for every migrant it does not accept under the mechanism.

Ireland and Denmark had opt-outs from participating in the Pact. Ireland notified the EU of its intention to opt-in to seven of the legislative components of the pact, which was approved by the European Commission in July 2024. Denmark notified the EU that it would apply three of the legislative components of the pact on 11 June 2024, as they were amendments to existing bilateral agreements between the EU and Denmark.

== Reception ==
=== Support ===
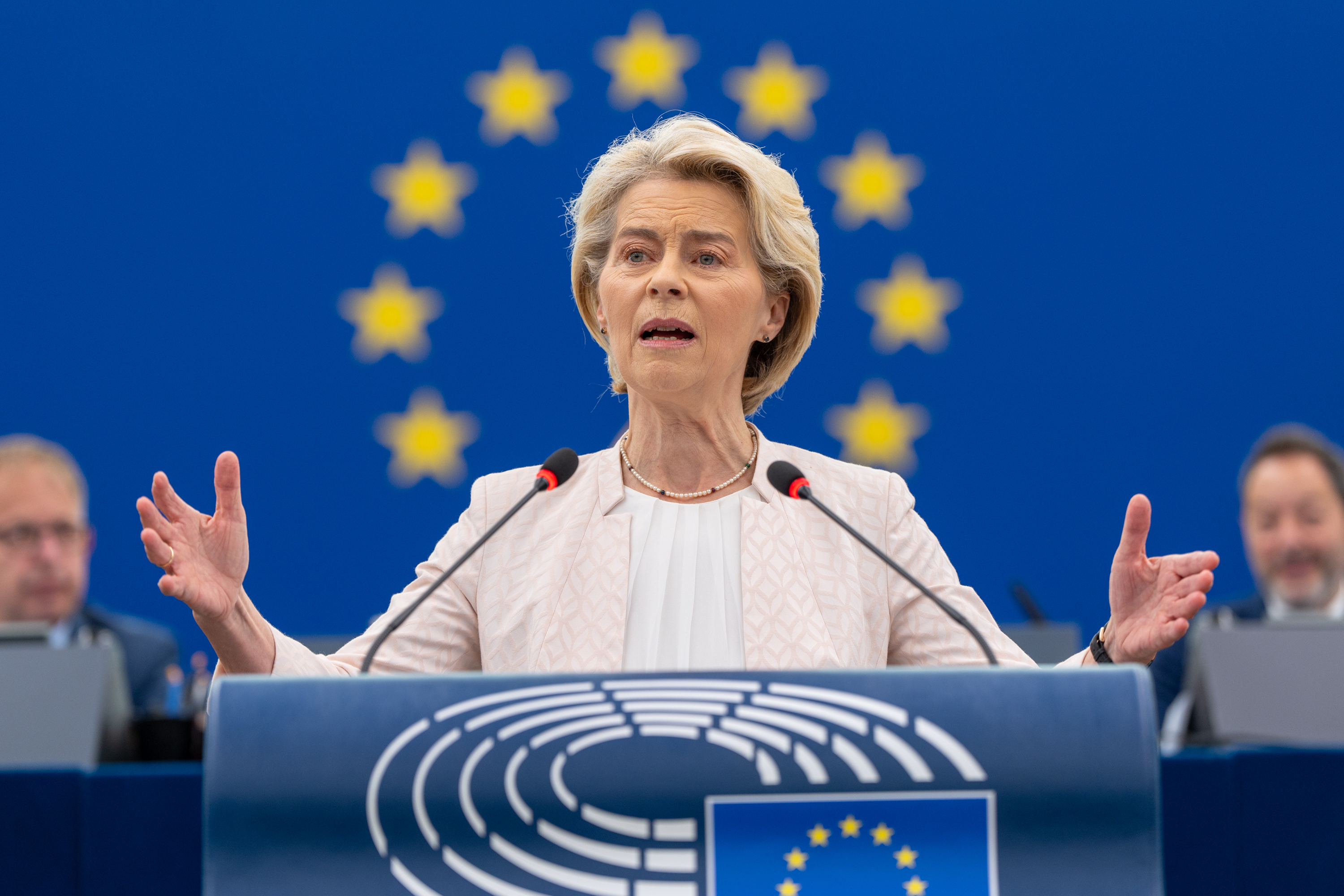
European Commission President Ursula von der Leyen

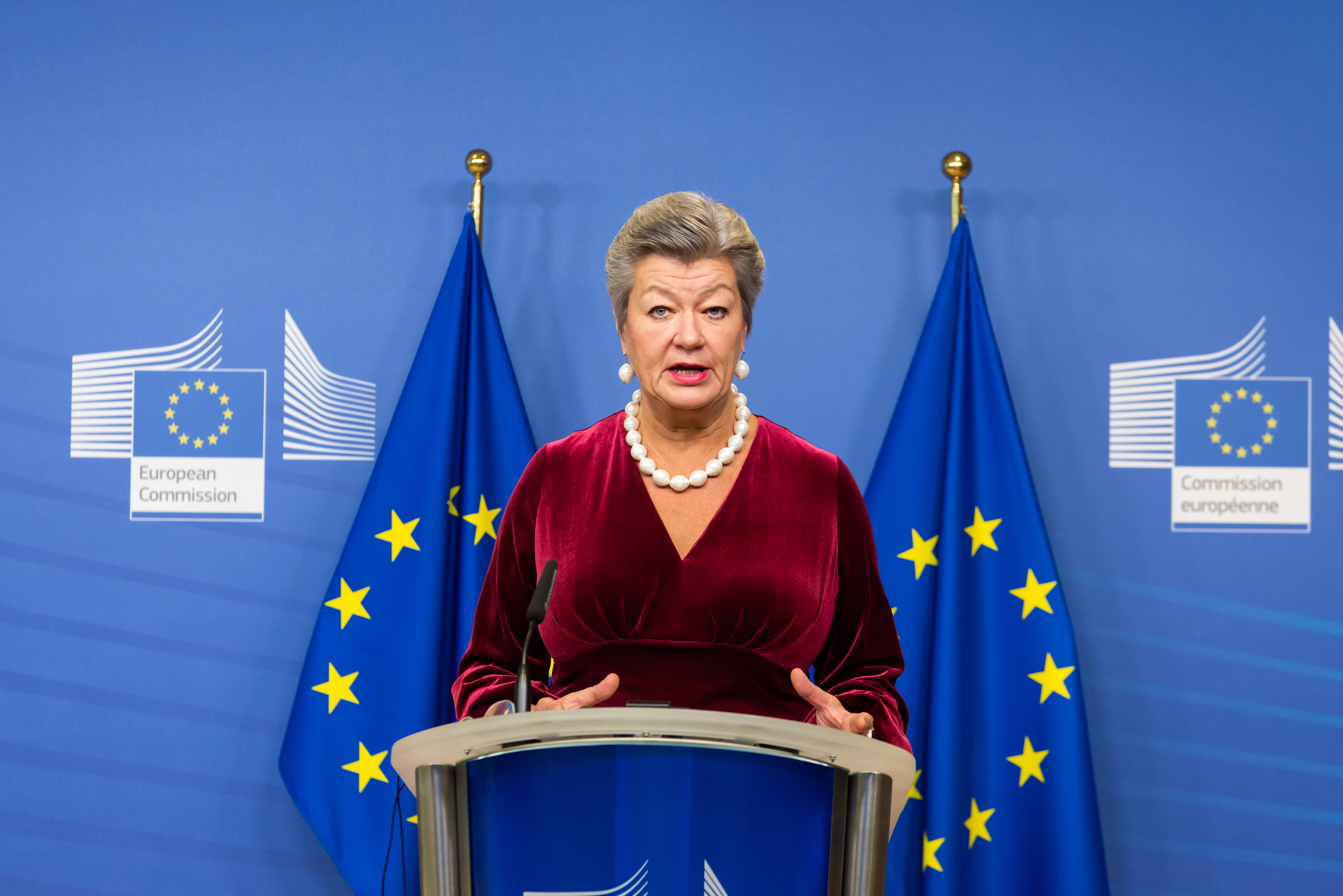
European Commissioner Ylva Johansson warned member states of legal consequences if they fail to enforce the Pact.

European Commission President Ursula von der Leyen said the Pact was a "huge achievement for Europe", and that it would deliver a "European solution" to migration by securing borders and increasing efficiency in processing asylum applications. President of the European Parliament Roberta Metsola of Malta said "We have delivered a robust legislative framework on how to deal with migration and asylum in the EU".

Chancellor of Germany Olaf Scholz hailed the deal as a "historic, indispensable" step that "limits irregular migration and finally relieves the burden on the countries that are particularly badly affected". Migration Minister of Greece Dimitris Kairidis called the Pact a "major breakthrough". The Pact was supported by the International Organization for Migration.

On 9 October 2024, Spanish Prime Minister Pedro Sánchez urged the European Parliament to speed up the implementation of The Pact to alleviate the migration crisis in the Canary Islands.

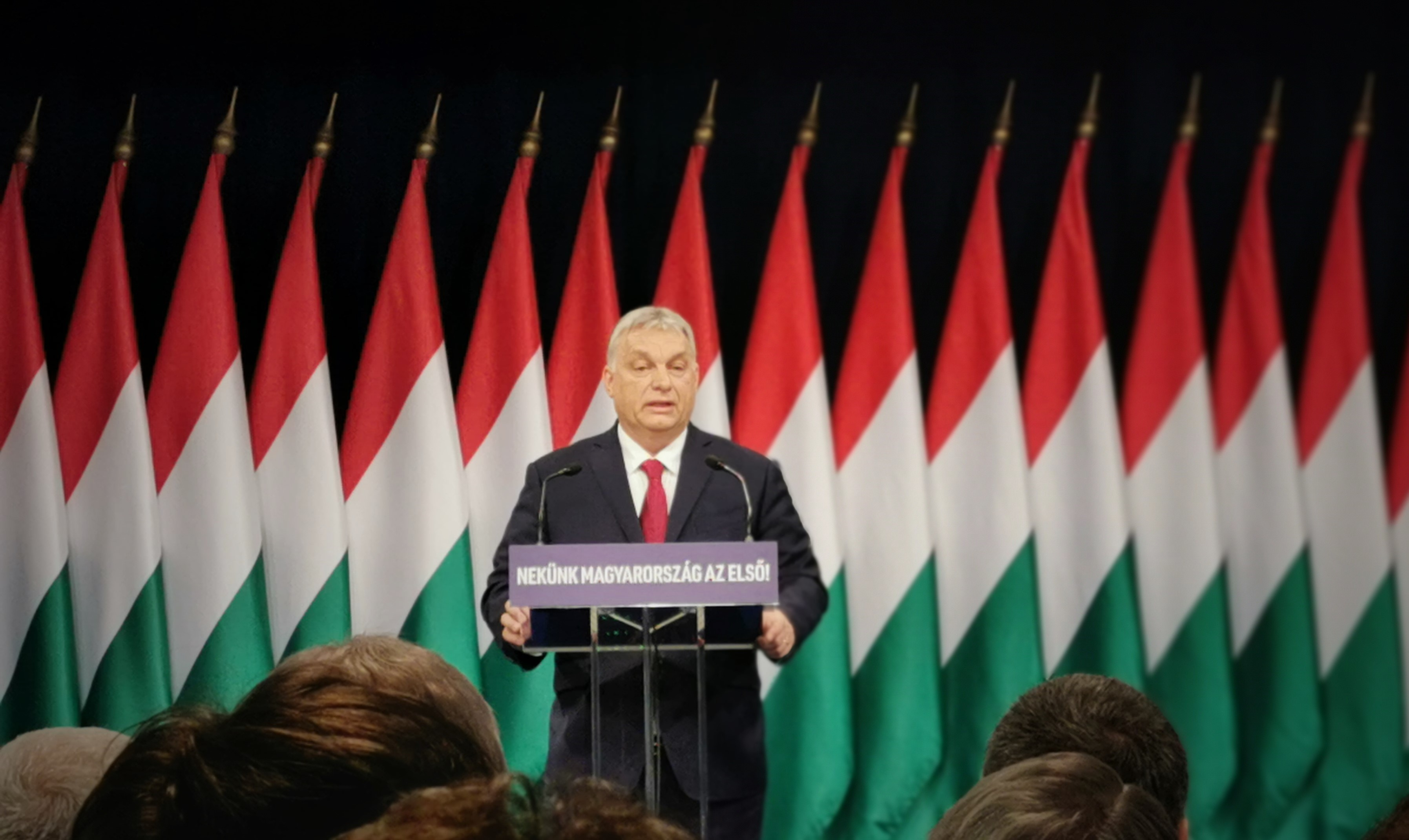
Prime Minister of Hungary Viktor Orbán, one of the Biggest critics of the Pact.

=== Criticism ===
The Pact has been criticized by some right-wing politicians for not going far enough to prevent illegal immigration, such as missing provisions relating to migrant returns, as well as for undermining national sovereignty.

Poland and Hungary opposed the Pact due to the obligations of hosting migrants, with Prime Minister of Poland Donald Tusk stating "we will protect Poland against the relocation mechanism" and former Prime Minister of Hungary Viktor Orbán saying "Secure borders are no more, Hungary will never give in to the mass migration frenzy". Slovak Prime Minister Robert Fico called for a better return policy, saying that out of "100% of illegal migrants who arrive in Europe, 80% stay there, and only 20% we manage to get back." Czech opposition leader Andrej Babiš called the approval of the Pact by Petr Fiala's cabinet the "greatest betrayal" of the Czech Republic in modern history.

Left-wing critics of the Pact have said that it puts the human rights of asylum seekers at risk. A group of human rights organizations including Oxfam, Caritas, Amnesty International, and Save the Children have criticised the deal in an open letter stating that it would create a "cruel system". More than 200 academics belonging to 66 predominantly European universities have called the Pact "inhumane" and demanded that the European Parliament and the Council to reconsider how they view the Pact.

In 2024, researchers like Gerald Knaus concluded, that the reform is unlikely to lead to a reduction in illegal immigration to the EU. Statutory exceptions reduce the number of people admissible in detention centers or qualifying for deportation. Only people who made false claims concerning their identity, those who pose a threat to national security and, if ascertainable at all, those who originate from countries with an asylum protection quota of under 20% will be allowed to be sent to detention centers. Additionally the number of asylum claims which will be allowed to be assessed in detention centers is limited at 120,000 cases per year, while actual arrival numbers in the EU were around one million every year in the past years. Every asylum seeker will still have the Right to counsel. German politicians had reduced the option of deporting people to countries of transit by putting the exception into the EU Migration Pact, that these asylum seekers need to have a verifiable connection to those countries, making it substantially more difficult to send anybody back. Heiko Rehmann wrote, as long as everybody has the right to request asylum in Europe and each claim has to be individually assessed, the problems will remain. Only a reform of the Convention Relating to the Status of Refugees would be able to change that.

In March 2026, in during the 2026 Iran war, Alberto Horst Neidhardt, head of the European Policy Centre’s migration program, concluded that the new system will be unable to deal with mass displacement and stated that nations could again resort to border closures.

After the pact took effect in June 2026, Sebastian Lange commented that the European Commission was ultimately responsible for the practical implementation and pointed out that EU members Hungary and Poland had already opted out of the solidarity-based distribution of asylum seekers who arrive in states at the European Unions external borders and that the conflict would continue to play out behind the scenes.

== Later developments ==
In September 2024, the Netherlands and Hungary asked to opt out of the Pact, while France said it was open to renegotiating its contents. All EU member states were required to submit their plans for implementation by 12 December, but only 14 countries submitted their plans by the deadline. In February 2025, Polish Prime Minister Tusk told Ursula von der Leyen that Poland would not implement the Pact, recalling that Poland had accepted a large number of Ukrainian refugees.

European Commissioner for Home Affairs Ylva Johansson warned in April 2024 that "All member states have to implement it and apply it. If not, the Commission will of course act and use – if necessary – infringement (procedures)."

In November 2026, more than 9,000 migrants arrived in Spain's Canary Islands within two weeks. On 14 November alone, 1,580 people reached the archipelago, setting a new single-day record. After this surge and the July 2026 border breach in Ceuta, Al Jazeera reported that the Pact failed to stop irregular migration to Spain. Canary Islands officials, including regional president Fernando Clavijo, also warned that the Pact would fail border regions without urgent EU and Spanish support.

== Implementation ==
The New Pact on Migration and Asylum officially entered into application on 12 June 2026. This step initiated the transition from a political agreement to operational execution. At an informal ministerial meeting in Nicosia, EU Migration Commissioner Magnus Brunner described the reform as the beginning of a broader implementation process. He emphasized that strict compliance with the new rules is legally binding on all member states. The transition relies on close cooperation with EU agencies, including Frontex, Eurodac, and eu-LISA, to monitor national execution plans and manage external migration dimensions.

== Legislation ==
The Pact resulted in the following ten pieces of legislation:

- Directive (EU) 2024/1346 (reception conditions directive)
- Regulation (EU) 2024/1347 (qualification regulation)
- Regulation (EU) 2024/1348 (asylum procedure regulation)
- Regulation (EU) 2024/1349 (regulation establishing a return border procedure)
- Regulation (EU) 2024/1350 (regulation establishing a resettlement and humanitarian admission framework)
- Regulation (EU) 2024/1351 (asylum and migration management regulation)
- Regulation (EU) 2024/1352 (regulation on consistency amendments related to screening)
- Regulation (EU) 2024/1356 (screening regulation)
- Regulation (EU) 2024/1358 (Eurodac regulation)
- Regulation (EU) 2024/1359 (regulation addressing situations of crisis and force majeure)

== See also ==
- Immigration to Europe
- 2015 European migrant crisis
- Migration and asylum policy of the European Union
- 2016 Hungarian migrant quota referendum
- 2023 Polish referendum
