= Return migration =

Return to country of citizenship

Return migration, or remigration in the broad sense of that word, is the migration of people back to their country of citizenship, origin, or ancestry. Research topics include the return migration process, motivations for returning, the experiences returnees encounter, and the impacts of return migration on both the country of departure and the country of arrival. This migration may be voluntary in line with the right of return, or it may be involuntary as a result of deportation.

The exact numbers are debated, but historian Mark Wyman says that return migration has been an enormous phenomenon, and he gives this example: "at least one-third of the 52 million Europeans who left Europe between 1824 and 1924 returned permanently to their homelands."

Return migration is the repatriation of a migrant. It should be distinguished from circular migration, in which migrants repeatedly travel to and from the country of origin, for example to plant and harvest crops each season.

== Motivations ==
Return migration to the original home by migrants living in their new home can be motivated by numerous factors, singly or in combination. Some common motivations for return migration are:

- Economic factors: Individuals may choose to return to their home country if they believe there are better job prospects, or the opportunity to purchase a farm with money earned abroad. They may go back because a deep economic downturn in the host economy undermines their opportunities. By the 1890s, German and Scandinavian immigrants had established prosperous farms and small businesses in the U.S. and were reluctant to return.
- Social and cultural factors: People may decide to return to their home country to be closer to family members, to reconnect with their cultural roots, or to participate in social and community activities. Their experience abroad gives them a new status: e.g. they may be sought out to give advice to would-be emigrants. Many Italian immigrants felt alienated in the U.S. and typically stayed for only a few years.
- Political factors can operate in the host or the home country: changes in political regimes, policy reforms, or improvements in governance may encourage individuals who had previously migrated to return to their home country. Their ethnicity might be a cause of intolerable discrimination in the host country. A sudden turn for the worse in the host country's political scene might cause them to flee home. They may also bring new skills learned while abroad. Jewish and Irish immigrants rarely returned to homelands (Russia and Ireland) where they were not well treated.
- Government factors: the host government might be hostile to immigrants, setting up barriers or threats or talking in that direction. Or the original home government might offer incentives to return, as Italy did in 1901-1927.
- Personal reasons: An elderly migrant might wish to retire and would thus no longer earn a high income in the host country. They may wish to return due to homesickness, a desire for familiarity, or a sense of attachment to their home country. In Kenya there is a wish to be buried alongside ancestors.

== Impact on host and home countries ==
Return migration can have major impacts on both the migrants themselves and the countries involved. For the migrants, it can lead to cultural readjustment, the reestablishment of social networks, and potential economic opportunities. For the countries of origin, return migration can bring back human capital, skills, and resources that contribute to development and economic growth. However, return migration is not always a smooth process. Migrants may face challenges in reintegrating into their home societies, including finding suitable employment, adapting to changes in the local environment, or dealing with the stigma associated with migration. The decision to return is often influenced by a complex interplay of individual circumstances and broader economic, social, and political factors.

== Government roles ==
Voluntary return is the return of eligible persons, such as refugees, to their country of origin or citizenship on the basis of freely expressed willingness to such return. Voluntary return, unlike expulsion and deportation, which are actions of sovereign states, is defined as a personal right under specific conditions described in various international instruments, such as the OAU Convention, along with customary international law.

Certain countries offer financial support to refugees and immigrants to help them start a new life in their country of origin. Examples in the 21st century are:

- The Danish government, which in 2009 began offering £12,000 each to immigrants to return,
- Switzerland offering about 6,500 Francs, targeted for business startups upon returning home,
- Ireland
- In 2016, Germany allocated €150 million over three years for migrants willing to return,
- The Swedish government began offering £3,500 each.
- 544 Nigerians returned home from Switzerland in 2013.

Two countries may have a re-admission agreement, which establishes procedures, on a reciprocal basis, for one state to return "irregular" non-nationals to their country of origin or to a country through which they have transited. Illegal immigrants are frequently repatriated as a matter of government policy. Repatriation measures of voluntary return, with financial assistance, as well as measures of deportation are used in many countries.

=== Deportation ===
Involuntary or forced repatriation is the return of refugees, prisoners of war, or civil detainees to their country of origin under circumstances that leave no other viable alternatives. According to modern international law, prisoners of war, civil detainees, or refugees refusing repatriation, particularly if motivated by fears of political persecution in their own country, should be protected from refoulement and given, if possible, temporary or permanent asylum.

=== Repatriation vs. return ===
While repatriation necessarily brings an individual to his or her territory of origin or citizenship, a return potentially includes bringing the person back to the point of departure. This could be to a third country, including a country of transit, which is a country the person has traveled through to get to the country of destination. A return could also be within the territorial boundaries of a country, as in the case of returning internally displaced persons and demobilized combatants. Bosnia and Herzegovina illustrates this form of return migration, with substantial numbers of displaced persons returning to their original communities following the armed conflict that concluded in 1995, often across the administrative divisions separating the country's entities. The distinction between repatriation and return, voluntary or involuntary, is not always clear.

== Rates of return from United States by ethnicity 1899–1924 ==
Ethnicity	Rate
Jewish	4%
Irish	9%
German	14%
Scandinavian	15%
Armenian	18%
Dutch	19%
British/British Canadian	19%
French Canadian	24%
Polish	33%
Italian	46%
Hungarian	47%
Greek	54%
Romanian	66%

== See also ==
- Push and pull factors in migration
