= Convention Governing the Specific Aspects of Refugee Problems in Africa =

Regional legal instrument in Africa

The Organisation of African Unity (OAU) Convention Governing the Specific Aspects of Refugee Problems in Africa, also called the OAU Refugee Convention, or the 1969 Refugee Convention, is regional legal instrument governing refugee protection in Africa. It comprises 15 articles and was enacted in Addis Ababa on September 10, 1969, and entered into force on June 20, 1974. It builds on the 1951 Refugee Convention and the 1967 Protocol and it has influenced the 1984 Cartagena Declaration and the 2009 Kampala Convention. The 1969 Refugee Convention's historical context is the era of decolonization, Apartheid, as well as internal political and military uprisings.

It was signed by 41 states or governments and has currently been ratified by 46 of the 55 member states of the African Union. It is the only binding, regional legal instrument on refugee issues in the developing world and a regional complement of the 1951 Refugee Convention.

== Legal innovations ==
The 1969 Refugee Convention has made some significant advances from the 1951 Refugee Convention.

- Discrimination against refugees is prohibited on the additional grounds of membership of a particular social group, nationality, or political opinion. These grounds were absent in the 1951 Refugee Convention.
- Any refugee who has "committed a serious non-political crime outside his country of refuge after his admission to that country as a refugee" or who "acts contrary to the purposes and principles of the OAU" will be excluded from the definition. It also contains a prohibition for refugees and asylum seekers to engage in any subversive activities against any member states.
- It contains suggestions for burden- and responsibility sharing, solidarity and cooperation between the member states, such as regional resettlement and financial support.
- It de-politicized the concept of asylum, a peaceful and humanitarian act, and declared that it shall no longer be perceived by member states as an unfriendly act and it urges the member states to grant asylum to those individuals who fall within the refugee definition. Whereas it advances here from the 1951 Refugee Convention it does still not grant an individual the right to asylum (it remains the state's discretion to grant this right).
- It introduced the "absolute" prohibition of refoulement, whereas the 1951 Refugee Convention allowed return or expulsion of refugees if the national security of the state would be at risk. However, if asylum seekers commit certain serious crimes, they will be excluded from the refugee definition and could still be returned or expelled. Refoulement is thus only limited but not absolutely prohibited.
- The principle of voluntary repatriation was first codified. However, the situation in the country of origin to which the refugee would return, was not defined and thus a fundamental change in circumstances and human rights standards in that country is not needed.

=== Expansion of the definition of the term refugee ===
The 1969 Refugee Convention expanded the 1951 definition of who is a refugee:

- A second paragraph is added to the definition of the term "refugee", which includes "external aggression, occupation, foreign domination or events seriously disturbing public order" as reasons for flight. This includes accidental situations that are not based on deliberate state action, i.e. the source of danger does not need to be the state or its agents. This includes those fleeing environmental catastrophes such as drought and famine. And that means that the fear of danger is no longer only linked to the individual's personal subjective reaction but also to the causal element of refugee situations. This change in the definition has paved the way for "prima facie" group refugee status determination.
- Whereas the 1951 Refugee Convention uses "country of his nationality" as geographical unit that a refugee must have fled from, the second paragraph of the definition in the 1969 Refugee Convention uses "his place of habitual residence" as geographical frame of reference.
