= Refugee employment =

Refugee employment refers to the employment of refugees. Gaining access to legal paid work can be a requirement for asylum status or citizenship in a host country and may be done with or without the assistance of non-governmental organizations. In some specific cases, refugees may also be given work by NGO's while en route to their intended destination (so working a country in between the intended destination country and the origin country). The latter may occur, if the intended destination country have closed their borders to migrants, and if staying in the origin country isn't an option either (i.e. due to lack of economic opportunities, climate change impact or insecurity in the origin country).

== Refugee workforce integration ==
Refugees are often faced with under-employment, unemployment and employment in informal economy. In this sense, many researchers and practitioners call for not just simple refugee employment, but a successful refugee workforce integration. Refugee workforce integration is understood to be a process in which refugees engage in economic activities (employment or self-employment), which are commensurate with individuals' professional goals and previous qualifications and experience, and provide adequate economic security and prospects for career advancement.

These barriers are sometimes called the canvas ceiling, by analogy to the glass ceiling for women.

== Refugee international adjustment ==
International adjustment is a process of achieving a “fit between [individuals] and the new environment in both work and non-work domains.”

== Refugee employment agreements ==
145 countries have signed the Convention relating to the Status of Refugees. In countries that have signed the Convention relating to the Status of Refugees, refugees are entitled to gainful employment under Chapter 3. Three articles in Chapter 3 pertain to the employment of refugees.

- Article 17 requires that countries should give refugees the same rights to employment as citizens and exempt refugees from restrictions applied to foreigners if they fulfill one of the following conditions:
  - He has completed three years’ residence in the country;
  - He has a spouse possessing the nationality of the country of residence. A refugee may not invoke the benefits of this provision if he has abandoned his spouse;
  - He has one or more children possessing the nationality of the country of residence.
- Article 18 states that refugees are allowed the same rights to self-employment as foreigners in the country.
- Article 19 allows for refugees with diplomas that are recognized by the authorities of the state should be accorded the same treatment as foreigners in the country.

Various countries may also have additional requirements or laws to gain employment. It can still be difficult for refugees to gain legal employment even in countries that have signed the convention.

Individuals usually need to have refugee status before they are allowed to gain employment. Countries usually have their own asylum processes to accord refugee status. In the US, this means getting approved by the United States Refugee Admissions Program. In several countries, refugee status is determined by UNHCR.

Some countries such as the UK, Australia, Canada, Chile, Greece, Mexico, Norway and Sweden also allow asylum-seekers to gain access to employment before they get refugee status if they meet certain conditions. Other countries such as Germany also allow individuals whose refugee applications have been rejected but are unable to return home to access legal employment.

Some countries like Malaysia that are not signatories to the Convention relating to the Status of Refugees have indicated willingness to allow refugee employment. However, in most countries that are non-signatories to the Convention relating to the Status of Refugees and particularly in developing countries, refugees are not allowed to work legally. Many refugees in these countries still work but do so in the informal economy.

== Arguments ==
=== Refugee employment benefits ===
Refugee employment is regarded as one of the ways to help refugees integrate into the host country. Employment helps to increase refugee’s self-reliance and dependence on social services. Employment would also help to increase access to other essential services such as healthcare and education. On the overall, it would lead to improved standards of living.

Hiring refugees can benefit businesses too. Refugees tend to have lower turnover rates than locals and helps reduce the business cost of rehiring.

The host country usually also benefits as refugees gain legal employment, it helps to grow the economy and increase the tax base. Studies have estimated the impact of legalizing immigrant employment on US economic growth to be 0.8% or about $15.2 billion per year. A similar study in Malaysia estimates the impact of legalizing employment for refugees to be RM3 billion in GDP growth by 2024 and an increase of RM50 million in tax receipts. This happens through various mechanisms, including increased consumer spending from refugees who have improved incomes.

Correspondingly, the growth of the economy is also expected to create new jobs. This is particularly as refugees tend to fill lower value jobs which are usually also jobs that locals shun in developed countries. This makes businesses more productive and creates industry growth. It also encourages locals to specialize and upgrade to higher value jobs. Where refugees are allowed to start businesses, they also create jobs that employ locals. A study estimates in Turkey, that Syrian entrepreneurs hire 9.4 employees, most of whom are Turkish natives.

=== Refugee employment challenges ===
A UNHCR-OCED Report identifies challenges with respect to refugee employment. Refugees are often unable to find employment due to a lack of information on the opportunities in the host country. Job matching and job seeking assistance is usually required to help refugees gain employment.

Cultural barriers often exist in the work environment and in the society. Refugees often face discrimination and resistance in host countries and refugee employment tends to be viewed as competition for citizens.

Employed refugees are at risk of exploitation, particularly in countries where they lack legal access to employment. This tends to be exacerbated partly because they lack knowledge of the home country’s laws and their rights. This ranges from employers withholding access to social security and utilization of child labor. In response, the United Nation Human Rights Commissioner has called for countries to treat refugees as right holders.

Employers may also be hesitant to employ refugees because they are unclear about the refugee employment laws in their countries and consequently take the conservative approach of not hiring refugees. Other challenges include a lack of clarity of the duration of stay of the refugees and a mismatch of skills from the employer and the refugees.

Companies often also do not see a business case for hiring refugees. Many view hiring refugees as a Corporate Social Responsibility obligation rather than being beneficial to the business.

== See also ==
- Green jobs
