= Right of asylum =

Juridical concept in which someone persecuted by their country may take refuge in another

The right of asylum, sometimes called right of political asylum (asylum from Ancient Greek ἄσυλον (ásulon) 'sanctuary'), is a juridical concept, under which people persecuted by their own rulers might be protected by another sovereign authority, such as a second country or another entity which in medieval times could offer sanctuary. This right was recognized by the Ancient Egyptians, Greeks, and Hebrews, from whom it was adopted into Western tradition. René Descartes fled to the Netherlands, Voltaire to England, and Thomas Hobbes to France, because each state offered protection to persecuted foreigners. Contemporary right of asylum is founded on the non-binding Universal Declaration of Human Rights.

== Universal Declaration of Human Rights ==
Right of asylum is enshrined by United Nations in the Article 14 of Universal Declaration of Human Rights of 1948:

1. Everyone has the right to seek and to enjoy in other countries asylum from persecution.

2. This right may not be invoked in the case of prosecutions genuinely arising from non-political crimes or from acts contrary to the purposes and principles of the United Nations.

— Universal Declaration of Human Rights, Article 14

The right of asylum is supported by the 1951 Convention Relating to the Status of Refugees and the 1967 Protocol Relating to the Status of Refugees. Before asylum is granted, an asylum seeker may be recognized as a refugee according to the Convention relating to the Status of Refugees, which defines refugee as a person "who is unable or unwilling to return to their country of origin owing to a well-founded fear of being persecuted for reasons of race, religion, nationality, membership of a particular social group, or political opinion."

== Contemporary political asylum ==
The Dutch government grants asylum to a couple of hundred elderly people from Yugoslavia, Poland, Hungary and the Baltic states. After the end of World War II, these people stayed in camps in Austria and West Germany. (Newsreel (in Dutch))

While the Universal Declaration of Human Rights itself is seen generally as non-binding, the right of asylum as defined in the Universal Declaration of Human Rights is referenced in the Convention Relating to the Status of Refugees, which most countries are parties of. Currently, in different countries there exist different legal statuses and legal definitions for asylum rights and refugees. Asylum is generally seen as a temporary form of refuge. The discretion due to the commonly encountered uncertainty about the credibility of the claims in the asylum application can be reduced with consistent local rules.

When asylum claims are rejected, non-refoulement applies according to the Convention Relating to the Status of Refugees Article 33, which forbids deporting asylum seekers to any country where "life or freedom would be threatened on account of his race, religion, nationality, membership of a particular social group or political opinion" with exceptions due to security and crime. The non-refoulement principle is generally seen as a customary international law.

Different jurisprudence can be used to interpret the right of asylum, including Critical legal studies and Constitutionalism.

Upon cessation of the right of asylum, such as when the condition in the country of origin have changed that there is no longer danger of persecution, voluntary expatriation according to non-refoulement or historically in some cases immediate deportation can follow.

=== By country ===
==== China ====
Paragraph 2 of Article 32 of the Constitution of China stipulates that China may grant asylum to foreigners who request it for political reasons.

In 1979, Hoàng Văn Hoan, the Vice Chairman of the National Assembly of Vietnam, was the last foreigner to be granted political asylum by China. From 1980 to the present, no foreigner has been granted political asylum by China. All foreigners who have been granted political asylum in China are foreign pro-communist political leaders.

==== European Union ====
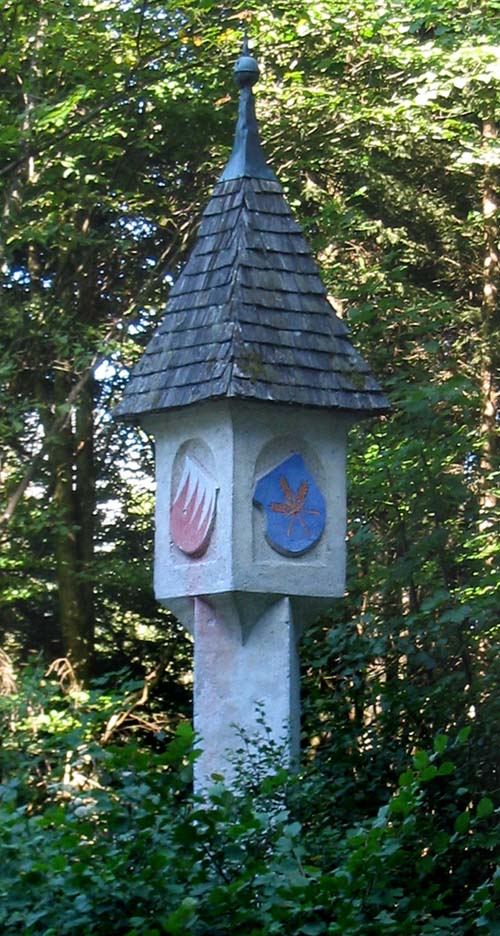
Medieval boundary marker at St. Georgenberg, Tyrol

Asylum in European Union member states formed over a half-century by application of the Geneva Convention of 28 July 1951 on the Status of Refugees. Common policies appeared in the 1990s in connection with the Schengen Agreement (which suppressed internal borders) so that asylum seekers unsuccessful in one Member State would not reapply in another. The common policy began with the Dublin Convention in 1990. It continued with the implementation of Eurodac and the Dublin Regulation in 2003, and the October 2009 adoption of two proposals by the European Commission. However, until today, the member states principally stay in charge for granting and organizing asylum. War refugees are protected under the subsidiary protection clause and the Temporary Protection Directive. The European Union (EU+) received over 1.1 million asylum applications with a rate of granting refugee status or subsidiary protection at 43%.

In June 2026, European Commission President Ursula von der Leyen signaled plans to alter the terms of the Temporary Protection Directive in response to the ongoing Ukrainian conscription crisis, leading EU member states to debate the exclusion of newly arriving Ukrainian men aged 23 to 60 from automatic protection to avoid undermining Ukraine's mobilization capacity.

==== France ====
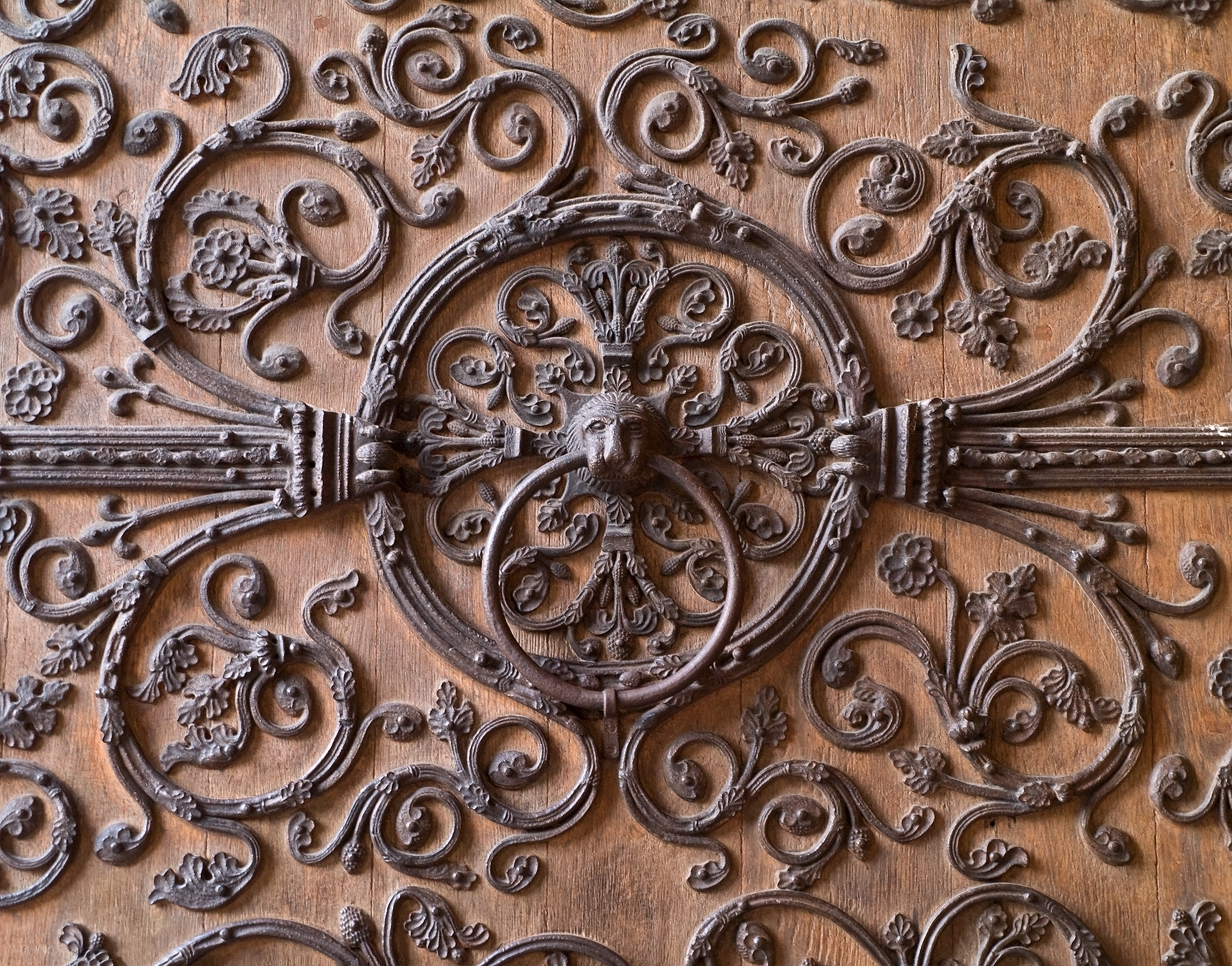
Sanctuary ring on a door of Notre-Dame de Paris (France)

France was the first country to establish a constitutional right to asylum, in Article 120 of the Constitution of 1793, for "foreigners banished from their fatherland for the cause of liberty". This constitution, however, never entered into force. The Preamble of the Constitution of 1946 similarly guaranteed the right of asylum to "anyone persecuted because of his activities in the cause of freedom". The modern French right of asylum is secured by the Preamble of the Constitution of 1958, via a reference to the Preamble of the 1946 Constitution.

In addition to the constitutional right to asylum, the modern French right to asylum (droit d'asile) is enshrined on a legal and regulatory basis in the Code of Entry and Residence of Foreigners and of the Right to Asylum.

France also adheres to international agreements which provide for application modalities for the right of asylum, such as the 1951 United Nations (UN) Convention Relating to the Status of Refugees (ratified in 1952), the additional 1967 protocol; articles K1 and K2 of the 1992 Maastricht Treaty as well as the 1985 Schengen Agreement, which defined EU immigration policy. Finally, the right of asylum is defined by article 18 of the Charter of Fundamental Rights of the European Union.

Some of the criteria for which an asylum application can be rejected include: i) Passage via “safe" third country, ii) Safe Country of Origin (An asylum seeker can be a prior refused asylum if they are a national of a country considered to be "safe" by the French asylum authority OFPRA), iii) Safety Threat (serious threat to the public order), or iv) Fraudulent Application (abuse of the asylum procedure for other reasons).

The 10 December 2003, law limited political asylum through two main restrictions:

- The notion of "internal asylum": the request may be rejected if the foreigner may benefit from political asylum on a portion of the territory of their home country.
- The OFPRA (Office français de protection des réfugiés et apatrides – French Office for the Protection of Refugees and Stateless Persons) now makes a list of allegedly "safe countries" which respect political rights and principles of liberty. If the demander of asylum comes from such a country, the request is processed in 15 days, and receives no social assistance protection. They may contest the decision, but this does not suspend any deportation order. The first list, enacted in July 2005, included as "safe countries" Benin, Cape Verde, Ghana, Mali, Mauritius Island, India, Senegal, Mongolia, Georgia, Ukraine, Bosnia and Croatia. It reduced in six months by about 80% the number of applicants from these countries. The second list, passed in July 2006, included Tanzania, Madagascar, Niger, Albania and Macedonia.

While restricted, the right of political asylum has been conserved in France amid various anti-immigration laws. Some people claim that, apart from the purely judicial path, the bureaucratic process is used to slow down and ultimately reject what might be considered as valid requests. According to Le Figaro, France granted 7,000 people the status of political refugee in 2006, out of a total of 35,000 requests; in 2005, the OFPRA in charge of examining the legitimacy of such requests granted less than 10,000 from a total of 50,000 requests. Numerous exiles from South American dictatorships, particularly from Augusto Pinochet's Chile and the Dirty War in Argentina, were received in the 1970s-80s. During the war in Afghanistan (2001–2021), tens of thousands of Afghan refugees were granted asylum in France.

===== Estonia =====
In September 2022, Estonian Prime Minister Kaja Kallas announced that Estonia would not grant asylum to Russians fleeing war mobilization, saying that "Every citizen is responsible for the actions of their state, and citizens of Russia are no exception. Therefore, we do not give asylum to Russian men who flee their country. They should oppose the war."

===== Latvia =====
In April 2023, after an initial denial by an executive body, a Latvian court approved the asylum application of a Russian citizen, who was facing a forced draft into the special military operation. He had previously been harassed by authorities for his support of Russian opposition figure Alexei Navalny and for his public stand against the Russian war against Ukraine.

===== Poland =====
In February 2025, Polish Prime Minister Donald Tusk informed European Commission President Ursula von der Leyen that Poland would refuse to implement the EU Asylum and Migration Pact, specifically rejecting the mandatory relocation of 30,000 asylum seekers or the alternative €600 million financial penalty, citing the large number of Ukrainian refugees Poland had already accepted.

In March 2025, Poland suspended the right to apply for asylum at the Belarus-Poland border, with the European Commission supporting Poland's move.

==== United Kingdom ====
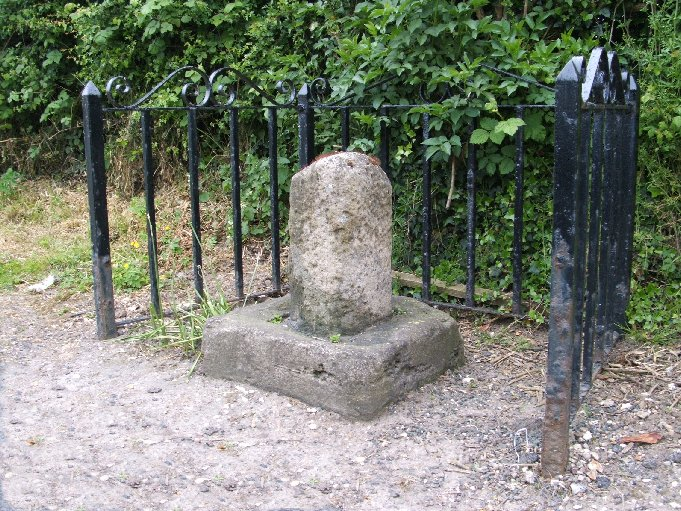
Remains of one of four medieval stone boundary markers for the sanctuary of Saint John of Beverley in the East Riding of Yorkshire

In the 19th century, the United Kingdom accorded political asylum to various persecuted people, among whom were many members of the socialist movement (including Karl Marx). With the 1845 attempted bombing of the Greenwich Royal Observatory and the 1911 Siege of Sidney Street in the context of the propaganda of the deed (anarchist) actions, political asylum was restricted.

==== United States ====
The United States recognizes the right of asylum of individuals as specified by international and federal law. In accordance with international law, the United States considers asylum candidates on the basis of persecution or fear they will be persecuted on account of race, religion, nationality, and/or membership in a particular social group or political opinion.

Every year, the President of the United States specifies a number of legally defined refugees who are granted refugee status outside the United States to be admitted to the country under 8 U.S.C. § 1157. Of these, many are recommended for firm resettlement by the offices of the UNHCR around the world. The annual number of refugees admitted varies from year to year and is determined by a joint collaboration between the incumbent presidential administration and Congress. By contrast, the United States does not enforce any such quota for asylum seekers. Rather, the annual number of asylum grants is dependent upon a combination of how many individuals submit applications and how many individuals are able to successfully prove their asylum claim.

According to US law, individuals are eligible for asylum status based on the following conditions:

- Meet the definition of refugee
- Are already inside the United States
- Are seeking admission at a port of entry

There are two main types of asylum an applicant can request under US law: affirmative asylum and defensive asylum. To apply for affirmative asylum, applicants must be physically present in the United States, regardless of their current immigration status. In most cases, affirmative asylum applications must be filed within one year of arriving in the United States. Defensive asylum is typically filed by individuals seeking to request a defense against removal or deportation from the United States. The primary distinction between these two processes is whether removal proceedings have been initiated for an applicant. If an individual has been placed in removal proceedings they must seek defensive asylum. If an individual has not been placed in removal proceedings, they are able to seek affirmative asylum.

The majority of asylum claims fail or are rejected. Still, since World War II, more refugees have found homes in the United States than any other nation. "Since the passage of the Refugee Act in 1980... the United States has admitted more than 3.1 million refugees." During much of the 1990s, the United States accepted over 100,000 refugees per year, though this figure has recently decreased to around 50,000 per year in the first decade of the 21st century, due to greater security concerns. As for asylum seekers, the latest statistics show that 86,400 persons sought sanctuary in the United States in 2001. Before the September 11 attacks in 2001, individual asylum applicants were evaluated in private proceedings by officers of the former Immigration and Naturalization Service (INS). In the aftermath of the attacks, the United States established three distinct organizations that each handle a different aspect of US immigration law, including the US Citizenship & Immigration Services (USCIS), Immigration & Customs Enforcement (ICE), and Customs & Border Protection (CFB). Asylum applications are handled by the USCIS.

Despite this, concerns have been raised with the US asylum and refugee determination processes. A recent empirical analysis by three legal scholars described the US asylum process as a game of refugee roulette; that is to say that the outcome of asylum determinations depends in large part on the personality of the particular adjudicator to whom an application is randomly assigned, rather than on the merits of the case. The very low numbers of Iraqi refugees accepted between 2003 and 2007 exemplifies concerns about the United States' refugee processes. The Foreign Policy Association reported that:

Perhaps the most perplexing component of the Iraq refugee crisis... has been the inability for the US to absorb more Iraqis following the 2003 invasion of the country. To date, the US has granted fewer than 800 Iraqis refugee status, just 133 in 2007. By contrast, the US granted asylum to more than 100,000 Vietnamese refugees during the Vietnam War.

Refugee and asylum policy advocates have called for a system based upon the "human interest approach" which seeks to allow asylum applicants be assessed on a case-by-case basis, as opposed to being assessed against other applicants. Under the US asylum structure, applicants' cases are often analyzed based on the strength of their educational/professional qualifications or on the level of danger they face in their country of origin. Amongst the academic community, such an approach is considered to be the narrative of the "gifted or traumatized" refugee. By contrast, the human-interest approach experts advocate for seeks to reframe the application process around the individual and focus on each applicant's unique story and experience.

According to US Department of Justice in 2023 there were 478,885 asylum applications filed, 31,630 asylum applications granted, and 937,611 asylum applications pending. The US Department of Justice shows for 2023 a rate of granting asylum at 14.40%, denial rate at 15.67%, administrative closure at 8.98% and other at 60.95% ("decision of abandonment, not adjudicated, other or withdrawn").

=== History ===
The Egyptians, Greeks and Hebrews recognized a religious "right of asylum", protecting people (including those accused of crime) from severe punishments. This principle was later adopted by the established Christian church, and various rules were developed that detailed how to qualify for protection and what degree of protection one would receive.

The Council of Orleans decided in 511, in the presence of Clovis I, that asylum could be granted to anyone who took refuge in a church or on church property, or at the home of a bishop. This protection was extended to murderers, thieves and adulterers alike.

==== Medieval England ====
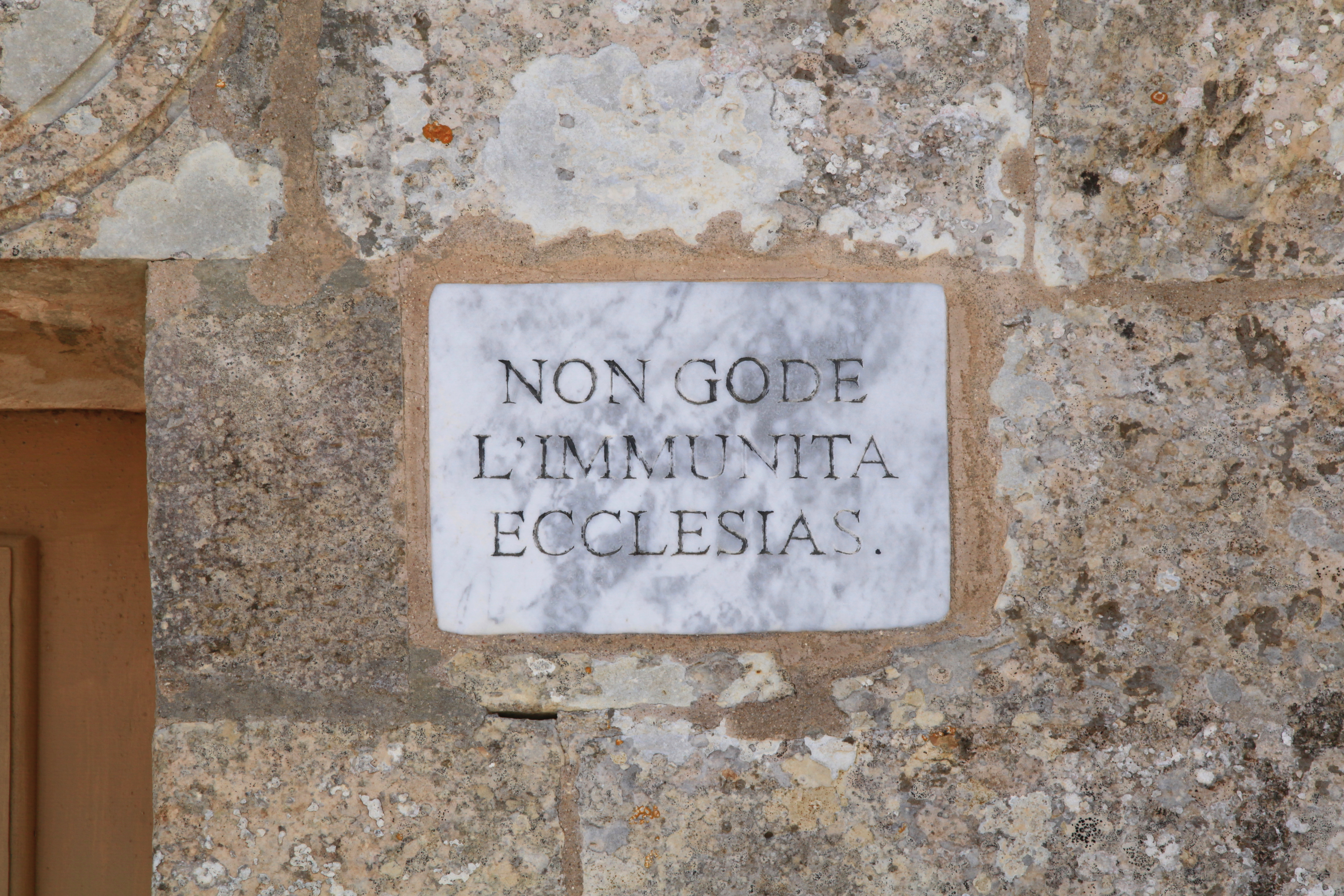
Plaque at St. Mary Magdalene Chapel, Dingli, Malta, indicating that the chapel did not enjoy ecclesiastical immunity

In England, King Æthelberht of Kent proclaimed the first Anglo-Saxon laws on sanctuary in about 600 AD. However Geoffrey of Monmouth in his Historia Regum Britanniae (c. 1136) says that the legendary pre-Saxon king Dunvallo Molmutius (4th/5th century BC) enacted sanctuary laws among the Molmutine Laws as recorded by Gildas (c. 500–570). The term grith was used by the laws of king Ethelred. By the Norman era that followed 1066, two kinds of sanctuary had evolved: all churches had the lower-level powers and could grant sanctuary within the church proper, but the broader powers of churches licensed by royal charter extended sanctuary to a zone around the church. At least twenty-two churches had charters for this broader sanctuary, including Battle Abbey, Beverley Minster, St Botolph's Priory Colchester, Durham Cathedral, Hexham Abbey, Norwich Cathedral, Ripon Cathedral, Wells Cathedral, Winchester Cathedral, Westminster Abbey and York Minster.

Sometimes the criminal had to get to the chapel itself to be protected, or ring a certain bell, hold a certain ring or door-knocker, or sit on a certain chair ("frithstool"). Some of these items survive at various churches. Elsewhere, sanctuary held in an area around the church or abbey, sometimes extending in radius to as much as a mile and a half. Stone "sanctuary crosses" marked the boundaries of the area; some crosses still exist as well. Thus it could become a race between the felon and the medieval law officers to the nearest sanctuary boundary. Serving of justice upon the fleet of foot could prove a difficult proposition.

Church sanctuaries were regulated by common law. An asylum seeker had to confess his sins, surrender his weapons, and permit supervision by a church or abbey organization with jurisdiction. Seekers then had forty days to decide whether to surrender to secular authorities and stand trial for their alleged crimes, or to confess their guilt, abjure the realm, and go into exile by the shortest route and never return without the king's permission. Those who did return faced execution under the law or excommunication from the Church.

If the suspects chose to confess their guilt and abjure, they did so in a public ceremony, usually at the church gates. They would surrender their possessions to the church, and any landed property to the Crown. The coroner, a medieval official, would then choose a port city from which the fugitive should leave England (though the fugitive sometimes had this privilege). The fugitive would set out barefooted and bareheaded, carrying a wooden cross-staff as a symbol of protection under the Church. Theoretically they would stay to the main highway, reach the port and take the first ship out of England. In practice, however, the fugitive could get a safe distance away, abandon the cross-staff and take off and start a new life. However, one can safely assume the friends and relatives of the victim knew of this ploy and would do everything in their power to make sure this did not happen; or indeed that the fugitives never reached their intended port of call, becoming victims of vigilante justice under the pretense of a fugitive who wandered too far off the main highway while trying to "escape".

Knowing the grim options, some fugitives rejected both choices and opted for an escape from the asylum before the forty days were up. Others simply made no choice and did nothing. Since it was illegal for the victim's friends to break into an asylum, the church would deprive the fugitive of food and water until a decision was made.

In the 14th century, fugitives claiming sanctuary were protected by a statute of 1315, Articuli Cleri (9 Edw. 2. Stat. 1). It was stipulated that fugitives should be allowed access outside of the church to urinate and defecate, and also not be allowed to die due to hunger while being protected in church. Sanctuary can only be confirmed under confession to a witness. However, the right of sanctuary was often ignored such as in the case of Isabella de Bury, or the peasants during the Peasants' Revolt who took shelter. In the case of Richard Folville, he was beheaded once forcibly removed from church.

Also where some flying unto the Church, abjure the Realm, according to the Custom of the Realm, and Lay-men or their Enemies do pursue them, and pluck them from the King's Highway, and they are hanged or headed; and whilst they be in the Church, are kept in the Church-yard with armed Men, and sometime in the Church, so straitly, that they cannot depart from the hallowed Ground to empty their Belly, and cannot be suffered to have Necessaries brought unto them for their Living:

The Answer. They that abjure the Realm so long as they be in the Common Way, shall be in the King's Peace, nor ought to be disturbed of any Man; and when they be in the Church, their Keepers ought not to abide in the Church yard, except Necessity or Peril of Escape do require so. And so long as they be in the Church, they shall not be compelled to flee away, but they shall have Necessaries for their Living, and may go forth to empty their Belly. And the King's Pleasure is, that Thieves or Appellors whensoever they will, may confess their Offences unto Priests; but let the Confessors beware that they do not erroneously inform such Appellors. — Chapter 10, Articuli Cleri (9 Edw. 2. Stat. 1)

During the Wars of the Roses, when the Yorkists or Lancastrians would suddenly get the upper hand by winning a battle, some adherents of the losing side might find themselves surrounded by adherents of the other side and not able to get back to their own side. Upon realizing this situation they would rush to sanctuary at the nearest church until it was safe to come out. A prime example is Queen Elizabeth Woodville, consort of Edward IV of England.

In 1470, when the Lancastrians briefly restored Henry VI to the throne, Queen Elizabeth was living in London with several young daughters. She moved with them into Westminster for sanctuary, living there in royal comfort until Edward IV was restored to the throne in 1471 and giving birth to their first son Edward V during that time. When King Edward IV died in 1483, Elizabeth (who was highly unpopular with even the Yorkists and probably did need protection) took her five daughters and youngest son (Richard, Duke of York) and again moved into sanctuary at Westminster. To be sure she had all the comforts of home, she brought so much furniture and so many chests that the workmen had to knock holes in some of the walls to get everything in fast enough to suit her.

Sanctuaries Act 1540
- Act of Parliament
- Parliament of England
- Long title: An Act concerning Sanctuaries, Privileges of Churches and Church-yards.
- Citation: 32 Hen. 8. c. 12
- Territorial extent: England and Wales

Dates
- Royal assent: 24 July 1540
- Commencement: 12 April 1540 (Note: Start of session.)
- Repealed: 28 July 1863
Other legislation
Repealed by	Statute Law Revision Act 1863

Status: Repealed

Text of statute as originally enacted

Henry VIII changed the rules of asylum by the Sanctuaries Act 1540 (32 Hen. 8. c. 12), reducing to a short list the types of crimes for which people were allowed to claim asylum. The medieval system of asylum was finally abolished entirely by James VI and I in 1623 by section 7 of the Continuance, etc. of Laws Act 1623 (21 Jas. 1. c. 28).

And be it alsoe enacted by the authoritie of this present Parliament, That no Sanctuarie or Priviledge of Sanctuary shalbe hereafter admitted or allowed in any case. — Section 7, Continuance, etc. of Laws Act 1623 (21 Jas. 1. c. 28)

== See also ==
- American fugitives in Cuba
- Asylum seeker
- Asylum shopping
- Diplomatic immunity
- Internally displaced person, a subcategory of displaced person
- List of people granted asylum
- Refusenik
- Right of return
- Human migration
- Global Compact on Refugees
- New York Declaration for Refugees and Migrants
