= Convention Relating to the Status of Refugees =

1951 United Nations multilateral treaty

- Parties to only the 1951 Convention Parties to only the 1967 Protocol Parties to both Non-members
- Signed: 28 July 1951
- Location: Geneva, Switzerland
- Effective: 22 April 1954
- Signatories: 145
- Parties: Convention: 146; Protocol: 147
- Depositary: Secretary-General of the United Nations

Full text
- 1951 Refugee Convention at Wikisource

The Convention Relating to the Status of Refugees, also known as the 1951 Refugee Convention or the Geneva Convention of 28 July 1951, is a United Nations multilateral treaty originally designed to establish the legal status of displaced persons in post-World War II Europe. The convention defines the criteria for refugee status and outlines specific rights for individuals after they have been lawfully granted asylum by a host state.

The Refugee Convention builds on Article 14 of the 1948 Universal Declaration of Human Rights, which recognizes the right of persons to seek asylum from persecution in other countries. A refugee may enjoy rights and benefits in a state in addition to those provided for in the convention.

== History ==
Prior to the 1951 convention, the League of Nations' Convention relating to the International Status of Refugees, of 28 October 1933, dealt with administrative measures such as the issuance of Nansen certificates, refoulement, legal questions, labour conditions, industrial accidents, welfare and relief, education, fiscal regime and exemption from reciprocity, and provided for the creation of committees for refugees. However, the League of Nations' convention was primarily designed for the relief of refugees from the breakup of the Ottoman Empire and from the Russian Revolution, and was only ratified by nine countries, limiting its scope.

The 1951 Convention was adopted by a United Nations Conference on the Status of Refugees and Stateless Persons, convened in Geneva in 1951. The convention was approved on 28 July 1951, and entered into force on 22 April 1954. It was initially limited to providing protection for European refugees from before 1 January 1951 (that is, those displaced by World War II), but states could make a declaration that the provisions would apply to refugees from other places.

The 1967 Protocol removed the time limits and applied to refugees "without any geographic limitation" but declarations previously made by parties to the convention on geographic scope were grandfathered.

== Definition of refugee ==
Article 1(A) of the convention "grandfathers" in those accepted under previous conventions:

... the Arrangements of 12 May 1926 and 30 June 1928 or under the Conventions of 28 October 1933 and 10 February 1938, the Protocol of 14 September 1939 or the Constitution of the International Refugee Organization ...

without excluding anyone falling under subsection 2 who was ruled not a refugee under previous systems. Article 1(A)(2) of the convention defines a refugee as a person who:

As a result of events occurring before 1 January 1951 and owing to well-founded fear of being persecuted for reasons of race, religion, nationality, membership of a particular social group or political opinion, is outside the country of his nationality and is unable or, owing to such fear, is unwilling to avail himself of the protection of that country; or who, not having a nationality and being outside the country of his former habitual residence as a result of such events, is unable or, owing to such fear, is unwilling to return to it.

With the passage of time and the emergence of new refugee situations, the need was increasingly felt to make the date specific provisions of the 1951 Convention applicable to later refugees. As a result, a Protocol Relating to the Status of Refugees was prepared, and entered into force on 4 October 1967. The UNHCR is called upon to provide international protection for refugees falling within its competence. The protocol defined refugee to mean any person within the 1951 Convention definition as if the words "As a result of events occurring before 1 January 1951 and ..." were omitted.

Several groups have built upon the 1951 Convention to create a more objective definition. While their terms differ from those of the 1951 Convention, the convention has significantly shaped the new, more objective definitions. They include the 1969 Convention Governing the Specific Aspects of Refugee Problems in Africa by the Organisation of African Unity (since 2002 African Union) and the 1984 Cartagena Declaration which, while nonbinding, also sets out regional standards for refugees in South and Central Americas, Mexico and the Caribbean.

Some scholars have started to consider this definition unsuitable for contemporary society, as, for example, environmental refugees are not captured in the definition. Researchers from Policy Exchange contend that courts and NGOs have "misunderstood" and "truncated" the 1951 Convention to create a permissive obligation that forces countries to accept claims they do not legally have to accept.

== Rights and responsibilities of parties ==
In the general principle of international law, treaties in force are binding upon the parties to it and must be performed in good faith. Countries that have ratified the Refugee Convention are obliged to protect refugees that are on their territory in accordance with its terms. There are a number of provisions to which parties to the Refugee Convention must adhere.

Refugees shall:

- abide by the national laws of the contracting states (Article 2)

The contracting states shall:

- exempt refugees from reciprocity after 3 years (Article 7): That means that the granting of a right to a refugee should not be subject to the granting of similar treatment by the refugee's country of nationality, because refugees do not enjoy the protection of their home state.
- be able to take provisional measures against a refugee if needed in the interest of essential national security (Article 9)
- respect a refugee's personal status and the rights that come with it, particularly rights related to marriage (Article 12)
- provide free access to courts for refugees (Article 16)
- provide administrative assistance for refugees (Article 25)
- provide identity papers for refugees (Article 27)
- provide travel documents for refugees (Article 28)
- allow refugees to transfer their assets (Article 30)
- provide the possibility of assimilation and naturalization to refugees (Article 34)
- cooperate with the UNHCR (Article 35) in the exercise of its functions and help the UNHCR to supervise the implementation of the provisions in the convention.
- provide information on any national legislation they may adopt to ensure the application of the convention (Article 36).
- settle disputes they may have with other contracting states at the International Court of Justice if not otherwise possible (Article 38)

The contracting states shall not:

- discriminate against refugees (Article 3)
- take exceptional measures against a refugee solely on account of his or her nationality (Article 8)
- expect refugees to pay taxes and fiscal charges that are different from those of nationals (Article 29)
- impose penalties on refugees who entered illegally in search of asylum if they present themselves without delay (Article 31)
- expel refugees (Article 32)
- forcibly return or "refoul" refugees to the country they have fled from (Article 33). It is widely accepted that the prohibition of forcible return is part of customary international law. This means that even states that are not party to the 1951 Refugee Convention must respect the principle of non-refoulement. Therefore, states are obligated under the convention and under customary international law to respect the principle of non-refoulement. If this principle is threatened, UNHCR can respond by intervening with relevant authorities and, if it deems necessary, will inform the public.

Refugees shall be treated at least like nationals in relation to:

- freedom to practice their religion (Article 4)
- the respect and protection of artistic rights and industrial property (Article 14)
- rationing (Article 20)
- elementary education (Article 22)
- public relief and assistance (Article 23)
- labour legislation and social security (Article 24)

Refugees shall be treated at least like other non-nationals in relation to:

- movable and immovable property (Article 13)
- the right of association in unions or other associations (Article 15)
- wage-earning employment (Article 17)
- self-employment (Article 18)
- practice of the liberal professions (Article 19)
- housing (Article 21)
- education higher than elementary (Article 22)
- the right to free movement and free choice of residence within the country (Article 26)

== Noncompliance ==
There is no body that monitors compliance. The United Nations High Commissioner for Refugees (UNHCR) has supervisory responsibilities but cannot enforce the convention, and there is no formal mechanism for individuals to file complaints. The Convention specifies that complaints should be referred to the International Court of Justice. It appears that no nation has ever done this.

An individual may lodge a complaint with the UN Human Rights Committee under the International Covenant on Civil and Political Rights or with the UN Committee on Economic, Social and Cultural Rights under the International Covenant on Economic, Social and Cultural Rights, but no one has ever done so in regard to violations of the convention. Nations may levy international sanctions against violators, but no nation has ever done so.

At present, the only real consequences of violation are 1) public shaming in the press, and 2) verbal condemnation of the violator by the UN and by other nations. To date, those have not proven to be significant deterrents.

== See also ==
- Asylum seeker
- Asylum shopping
- Convention relating to the Status of Stateless Persons
- Global Compact on Refugees
- Impediment to expulsion
- Office of the United Nations High Commissioner for Human Rights (OHCHR)
- Refugee employment
- Refugee law
- Right of asylum
- Statelessness
- Travel document
- Universal Declaration of Human Rights (Article 14)
- United Nations Commission on Human Rights
- World Refugee Day
- XXB Refugee, as per the 1951 Convention Relating to the Status of Refugees
