= Asylum shopping =

Practice of seeking asylum in several states

Asylum shopping is a term for the practice by some asylum seekers of applying for asylum in several states or seeking to apply in a particular state after traveling through other states. It is used mostly in the context of the European Union and the Schengen Area, but has also been used by the Federal Court of Canada.

Refugees and asylum-seekers are protected by international convention under the principle of non-refoulement, which establishes that a country cannot force someone seeking refuge to return to a country of origin if the person is likely to be persecuted there. The Dublin Convention covering the European Union stipulates that asylum seekers are returned to the country where their entry into the union was first recorded, and where they were first fingerprinted. Another objective of this policy is to prevent asylum seekers in orbit, i.e., to prevent the continual transfer of asylum seekers between countries trying to get others to accept them. One of the objectives of the Police and Judicial Co-operation in Criminal Matters is to prevent asylum shopping.

European law, the Dublin Regulation, does not require that asylum seekers have their asylum claim registered in the first country they arrive in, but that the decision of the first EU country they apply in is the final decision in all EU countries. However, among some asylum seekers, fingerprinting and registration is vehemently resisted in countries that are not asylum-seeker friendly. For example, some people seek to apply for asylum in Germany and Sweden where a more serious approach to welfare and integration support is taken, and fundamental rights are more likely to be met.

Some asylum seekers reportedly burned their fingers to avoid fingerprint record control in Italy so that they could apply for asylum in a different country. The fingerprint record, known as the Eurodac system, is used to intercept multiple or false asylum claims. In Ireland, two-thirds of asylum seekers whose applications failed were found to be already known to the British border authorities, a third of the time under a different nationality, such as Tanzanians claiming to be fleeing persecution in Somalia.

== See also ==
- Asylum seeker
- Chain migration
- Economic results of migration
- Forum shopping
- Gaming the system
- Illegal immigration
- Non-refoulement
- Roxham Road
