= Protocol Relating to the Status of Refugees =

1967 UN treaty regarding refugees

- Parties to only the 1951 Convention Parties to only the 1967 Protocol Parties to both Non-members
- Signed: 31 January 1967
- Location: New York
- Effective: 4 October 1967
- Signatories: 19
- Parties: Convention: 145; Protocol: 146
- Depositary: Secretary-General of the United Nations
- Languages: English and French (Chinese, Russian and Spanish)

The Protocol Relating to the Status of Refugees is a key treaty in international refugee law. It entered into force on 4 October 1967, and 146 countries are parties.

The 1951 United Nations Convention Relating to the Status of Refugees restricted refugee status to those whose circumstances had come about "as a result of events occurring before 1 January 1951", as well as giving states party to the convention the option of interpreting this as "events occurring in Europe" or "events occurring in Europe or elsewhere".

The 1967 Protocol removed both the temporal and geographic restrictions. This was needed in the historical context of refugee flows resulting from decolonisation. Madagascar and Saint Kitts and Nevis are parties only to the convention, while Cape Verde, the United States of America and Venezuela are parties only to the protocol.

The protocol gave those states which had previously ratified the 1951 Convention and chosen to use the definition restricted to Europe the option to retain that restriction. Only four states actually chose that restriction: the Republic of the Congo, Madagascar, Monaco, and Turkey. Congo and Monaco dropped the restriction upon ratifying the 1967 Protocol; Turkey retained it, and Madagascar has not ratified the protocol.

There exists a diversity of definition of refugees across the globe, where countries and even local districts have differing legal meanings and rights allocated to refugees.
