= ERF =

Erf or ERF may refer to:

== Industry ==
- Enerplus, a North American energy producer whose stock is listed as ERF under the TSX and NYSE
- ERF (truck manufacturer), a former British truck manufacturer

== Mathematics ==
- Error function, erf
- Exponential response formula

== Science and technology ==
- Effective radiative forcing, a concept to compare radiative forcing in climate models
- ERF (gene), coding for ETS domain-containing transcription factor
- Electrorheological fluid
- Eukaryotic release factors
- Event-related field

== People ==
- Keith Erf, American politician

== Other uses ==
- Erf (law), in real estate law
- Erf (river), in Germany
- Estuarine Research Federation, an American environmental organization
- Erfurt-Weimar Airport, in Germany (IATA code)
- European Racquetball Federation
- European Refugee Fund
- Extreme Reaction Force, in United States military prisons
- Reformed Church of France (French: Église réformée de France), a Christian denomination in France
