= Asylum, Migration and Integration Fund =

European Commission funding programme

The European Commission's Asylum, Migration and Integration Fund (previously the Return Fund, the Refugee Fund, and the Integration Fund) is a funding programme managed by the Directorate-General for Migration and Home Affairs which promotes the efficient management of migration flows and the implementation, strengthening and development of a common approach to asylum and immigration in the European Union. All EU Member States except Denmark participate in the implementation of this Fund. Most of the funds are provided to the EU Member States for activities addressing previously agreed upon themes. A part of the funding is reserved for emergency assistance. A final part is reserved for Union Actions, which are European Commission managed projects that are developed as either calls for proposals, direct awards, procurements, or delegation agreements.

In addition to providing funding for projects, the programme funds the activities and future development of the European Migration Network.

The lists of projects and initiatives below are not complete.

== Context ==
=== Institutional history ===
Since 1999, a common area of freedom, security and justice has been established in the European Council because of the priority that integration was on the European political agenda. In 2004, more specific directives were also included in the Hague Programme and the Council of Justice adopted the Common Basic Principles of this integration. Assessments and preparations for new instruments began to be carried out in 2010 and a public consultation was held in 2011 where the importance of the integration system was highlighted. A conference was held in 2011 with the same theme, which influenced subsequent political decisions with a vision of solidarity. In order to maximise the benefits of immigration, the Stockholm Programme established the priorities within the European agenda for the period 2010–2014.

The Asylum, Migration and Integration Fund (AMIF) was drafted on 16 April 2014 and is established for the period 2014–2020. It provides for a total fund of €3.137 billion for seven years. However, in the period prior to 2014, i.e. 2007–2013, these funds were spread over three instead of one. These are the European Refugee Fund (ERF) with a budget of 700 million euros, the European Fund for the Integration of Third Country Nationals with a budget of 825 million euros and the European Return Fund (ERF) with a budget of 630 million euros. These eventually ended up merging due to a failure of monitoring, a too high administrative cost and a lack of coordination in both implementation at national level and coordination with other assistance funds. Therefore, a convergence of the funds would be more effective according to the analysis report.

=== Establishment ===
It was proposed by the European Commission and established by the European Parliament and the Council of the European Union on the basis of Articles 78(2), 79(2) and (4), 82 (1), 84, 87 (2) of Title V of the Treaty on the Functioning of the European Union (TFEU). Which is also referred to as "space, freedom and justice", the basis for asylum, migration and integration. The Committee of the Regions of the Member States and the European Economic and Social Committee were consulted. This regulation is supported by a series of evaluations, notably by the ERF in the period 2005–2007, the European Fund for the Integration of Third Country Nationals in 2007–2009 and ERF in 2008–2009.

==== Mechanism within the EU institutional framework on Asylum and Migration ====
The AMIF together with the Internal Security Fund (ISF), which has a Budget of 3.76 billion euros for 2014–2020, and the funding of IT systems for this area represent 1% of the EU budget. And these fall under the Charter of Fundamental Rights of the European Union.

=== Intended effects ===
It was intended to strengthen the action of the funds by pooling them, the reasons were detailed in the 2012 analysis reports and the decision was supported by the United Nations High Commissioner for Refugees (UNHCR). This would facilitate the funding of concrete actions and would also benefit member states. Other benefits were the financial cut to IT costs and the consistency of information that would no longer be lost between different funds.

=== Objectives ===
According to the text of the international instrument, the objectives of the Asylum, Migration and Integration Fund are listed in Article 3. These are:

1. To strengthen and develop the establishment of the Common European Asylum System (CEAS).
2. To promote the integration of third country nationals and to finance the relocation of unaccepted non-members.
3. Fair returns in order to stop illegal immigration.
4. Increase solidarity between member countries with a proportional distribution to their exposure at migration flows.

== Policies ==
On April 16, 2014, the Regulation of the European Parliament and of the council of the European union establishing the Asylum, Migration and Integration Fund was established by the European Parliament and the Council of the European Union.

It is divided in 6 chapters and counts a total of 32 articles:

1. General provisions (4 articles)

2. Common European asylum system (3 articles)

3. Integration of third-country nationals and legal migration (3 articles)

4. Return (3 articles)

5. Financial and implementation framework (11 articles)

6. Final provisions (8 articles)

The first part of the amendment introduces the goals and objectives the European Parliament and the Council of the European Union want to achieve by establishing it. This introduction puts some ground rules to how and in which circumstances the Fund should be used by the member states and what should ideally result of a good use of it.

The first chapter (General provisions) puts light on the purpose of the fund, defines the most important and most used words throughout the whole amendment as well as cites the general objectives of the Asylum, Migration and Integration Fund.

The second chapter (Common European asylum system) is a draft of the existing system. It states who and what for help funded by the Asylum, Migration and Integration Fund one can get in a member state of the European Union. It further explains that the money of the Fund can be used to reinforce the member states capacity to analyse its policies and its data on the migration topic as well as to upgrade infrastructures to be able to care for anyone who has gotten a green light to stay in a member state.

The third chapter (Integration of third-country nationals and legal migration) focuses on the integration process. The Fund can be used to help in the national's home country if it improves his quality of life in the member state. Further, it can be used to improve the quality of the integration infrastructures and services in the member state and to help member states to implement better and wider integration facilities and to organise their integration process.

The fourth chapter (Return) is related to the return of third-country nationals, who are at the moment staying in a member state, who either chose to go back to their home country, either were not given a permanent right to stay. The Fund can help them return safely by helping with the administration and the physical needs of the national.

The fifth chapter (Financial and implementation framework) focuses on the actual budget and how it is split between all the different infrastructures and programmes linked to asylum, migration and integration needed for the assistance of the nationals.

The sixth and final chapter (Final provisions) gives more details on the amendment and the role and the power of the European Union, the European Council, the European Parliament and the European Commission. This chapter also lists a few rules about the future procedure regarding the reviewing and the possible modification of the amendment.

== The refugee crisis and the changes to the AMIF ==
The budget designated for immigration was increased by the European Commission due to the mass of migrants seeking asylum on the Spanish and Italian coasts in 2015 known as the refugee crisis. The consequences of such a mobilization were worrying and required an improvement in the current policy. This translates into a reform of the Dublin system that divides the migrant quota among member countries.

== List of projects funded during 2014-2020 ==
- Pilot Project on Unaccompanied Minors, centrally managed by the European Commission Directorate General Migration and Home Affairs.

Under the 2014 call for proposals to strengthen and develop all aspects of the Common European Asylum System, including its external dimension:

- Time for Needs: Listening, Healing, Protecting - A Joint Action for an Appropriate Assessment of Special Needs of Victims of Torture and Violence led by the Italian Council for Refugees.
- Nouvelle approche pour renforcer l'Intégration Culturelle des jeunes Réfugiés (NICeR) led by C.I.O.F.S. Formazione Professionale.
- Common standards for the medical examination in the asylum procedure: Art. 18 Directive 2013/32/EU. A genuine contribution to decision-making led by Institute for Human Rights and Medical Assessment.
- TRACKS: Identification of TRafficked Asylum seeKers' Special needs led by Forum Réfugiés-Cosi.
- Skills2Work: Valuing Skills of Beneficiaries of International Protection in the European Union led by the International Organization for Migration.
- INFORM: Legal and Procedural Information for Asylum Seekers in the European Union led by Middlesex University Higher Education Corporation.

Action grants to provide emergency assistance:

- ’’Emergency Assistance - consolidating reception capacities in respect of migratory flows reaching strategic border points of Italian territory - PRAESIDIUM IX Bis’’ led by The Italian Ministry of Interior.
- ’’Improved capacity of Italian territory to accept unaccompanied foreign minors, with a particular reference to areas most affected by exceptional migratory flows’’ led by The Italian Ministry of Interior.
- ’’Emergency Assistance - addressing the needs related to the mass arrival of third- country nationals that may be in need of international protection, including their initial screening, provision for basic needs on a daily basis, healthcare, interpretation and psychosocial support’’ led by The Ministry of Interior of Cyprus.
- ’’Emergency assistance - Establishment of an emergency day accommodation centre for irregular migrants in Calais’’ led by Préfecture du Pas- de-Calais.
- ’’Emergency Assistance - Capacity-building of asylum reception and human resources aiming to respond effectively to migration pressure in Hungary’’ led by The Office of Immigration and Nationality of Hungary.
- ’’Temporary increase of accommodations for asylum seekers and related services and improvement of asylum procedures’’ led by The Federal Office for Migration and Refugees of Germany.
- ’’Emergency Assistance for the deployment of Asylum Units implementing fast track examination of the claims for international protection submitted by Syrian nationals in Greece’’ led by The Ministry of Interior and Administrative Reconstruction - Asylum Service of Greece.
- ’’Secure appropriate accommodation and extra staff to handle asylum applications as a result of the unforeseen influx of asylum seekers’’ led by The Ministry of Security and Justice of the Netherlands.
- ’’Support for Addressing the Migratory Pressure in Bulgaria’’ led by The State Agency for Refugees with the Council of Ministers of Bulgaria.
- ’’Emergency measures for the improvement of the Hungarian asylum reception capacity and for the support of public proceedings - 2015’’ led by The Office of Immigration and Nationality of Hungary.
- ’’Hébergement d'urgence, réparti sur l'ensemble du territoire français, pour les migrants du Calaisis acceptant de déposer une demande d'asile en France’’ led by The French Ministry of Interior.
- ’’Provision of essential sanitary and humanitarian reception conditions to care for the irregular migrants in Calais’’ led by The French Ministry of Interior.
- ’’Return of third countries nationals to their country of origin’’ led by The Hellenic Police HQ.
- ’’AMIF Soforthilfe 2015 DE/ AMIF Emergency Assistance 2015 DE’’ led by The Federal Office for Migration and Refugees of Germany.
- ’’Transportation, Accommodation, Alimentation of TCNs in need of international protection and/or potential asylum seekers to mainland’’ led by The Secretary General for Co-ordination of Greece.
- ’’Emergency measures asylum system 2015’’ led by The Federal Ministry of Interior of Austria.
- ’’Addressing the needs related to the mass arrival of third country nationals that may be in need of international protection’’ led by The Ministry of Interior of Croatia.
- ’’Increase of existing accommodation capacities to cope and manage mass arrival of third country nationals in Slovenia’’ led by The Ministry of Interior of Spain.
- ’’Relocation programme from Greece to other EU Member States for beneficiaries in clear need of international protection’’ led by The IOM.

== List of projects funded during 2008-2013 ==
Under the Return fund:

- Programme for voluntary return of vulnerable persons led by the International Migration fund.
- Strengthening consultation with the diplomatic missions of third countries led by the Romanian Immigration Office.
- Sustainable voluntary return led by Asociación de Cooperación Bolivia-España.
- Child exploitation – Cross-national child protection in practice led by the Council of the Baltic Sea States.
- Better information for durable solutions and protection led by National Committee UNICEF Netherlands.
