= Marriage migration =

Form of migration associated with marriage

Marriage migration is a form of human migration in which cross-border movement is closely linked to marriage, including migration for family formation, spousal reunification, or other marriage-related family movement. In academic and policy literature, it is often treated as part of the broader field of family migration.

== Terminology ==
There is no universally accepted definition of marriage migration. Some authors use the term narrowly to describe the migration of a spouse after marriage, while others prefer broader expressions such as marriage-related migration to cover situations in which marriage plays a significant role in migration, including fiancés, civil partners, and transnational family formation. In policy language, marriage migration is commonly classified under family migration.

The OECD distinguishes several forms of family migration. In its typology, family formation refers to cases in which "a resident national or foreigner marries a foreigner and sponsors that individual for admission or for status change", while family reunification refers to the later admission of existing family members. This distinction is often important in immigration law, although the boundary between marriage migration and other forms of family migration is not always clear.

== Forms ==
=== Family formation and family reunification ===
One common form of marriage migration occurs when a resident citizen or settled migrant marries a person abroad and sponsors that spouse for admission. In diaspora settings, this is often described as transnational or homeland marriage, especially where second- or later-generation migrants marry partners from a country of family origin.

Marriage migration may also occur through delayed reunification, in which spouses do not migrate together but reunite after a period of separation. OECD research links long delays in family reunification with poorer labour market and language outcomes for some spouses, particularly in evidence from Germany.

=== Transnational and brokered marriages ===
In some regions, marriage migration involves commercially arranged or brokered transnational marriages. Research on East Asia describes such marriages as part of broader regional systems of social reproduction shaped by gender inequality, class, age, ethnicity, and citizenship status. Public discourse has often been polarized, depicting marriage migrants either as opportunistic users of immigration systems or as passive victims; scholars have criticized this contrast as overly simplistic.

== Regional patterns ==
=== Europe ===
In Europe, marriage migration is often discussed in relation to family reunification law and migrant integration. In the United Kingdom and several other European states, policy debates have focused on spousal migration within ethnic minority communities, especially where marriage to a partner from a country of origin remains common across generations. Researchers argue that evidence for broad claims linking marriage migration to poor integration is mixed, and that much public debate relies on partial or stereotyped understandings.

At the EU level, family reunification for legally resident third-country nationals is governed primarily by Council Directive 2003/86/EC. A 2025 European Migration Network review found that Member States increasingly differentiate between migrant groups, often facilitating family migration for skilled workers while maintaining or tightening requirements such as minimum ages, waiting periods, housing standards, and proof of income for others.

=== East Asia ===
In East Asia, marriage migration is closely associated with cross-border marriages involving women from countries such as Vietnam, Indonesia and China marrying men in wealthier receiving societies including Taiwan, South Korea and Singapore. One study described a rise since the late 1990s in the migration of Vietnamese women to neighbouring countries for marriage, linking the trend to changing gendered family regimes and economic inequalities across the region.

Research on South Korea finds both initial disadvantage and later improvement among marriage migrants. A 2024 study using data on more than 70,000 marriages reported that marriage migrants tended to have low earnings and employment rates on arrival, but their economic outcomes improved over time and, after 15 years, approached those of native-born Korean wives.

== Policy and legal issues ==
Marriage migration is regulated mainly through immigration and family law. Governments set visa sponsorship rules, minimum income thresholds, housing requirements, age thresholds, waiting periods, and language requirements for incoming spouses. Supporters argue that such rules protect welfare systems, prevent abuse, or promote integration, while critics argue they can delay family life, increase dependency, and disproportionately affect poorer households and some ethnic minority groups.

In the EU, post-reunification rights such as access to education, employment and healthcare are generally available, but routes to long-term or autonomous residence vary significantly among states. The EMN noted in 2025 that delayed access to autonomous residence could deepen dependency on a sponsoring spouse, while some countries provide earlier access in cases such as domestic violence or widowhood.

== See also ==
- Arranged marriage
- Family reunification
- Forced marriage
- Human migration
- Mail-order bride
