= European Union Agency for Asylum =

Agency of the European Union

European Union Agency for Asylum (EUAA)
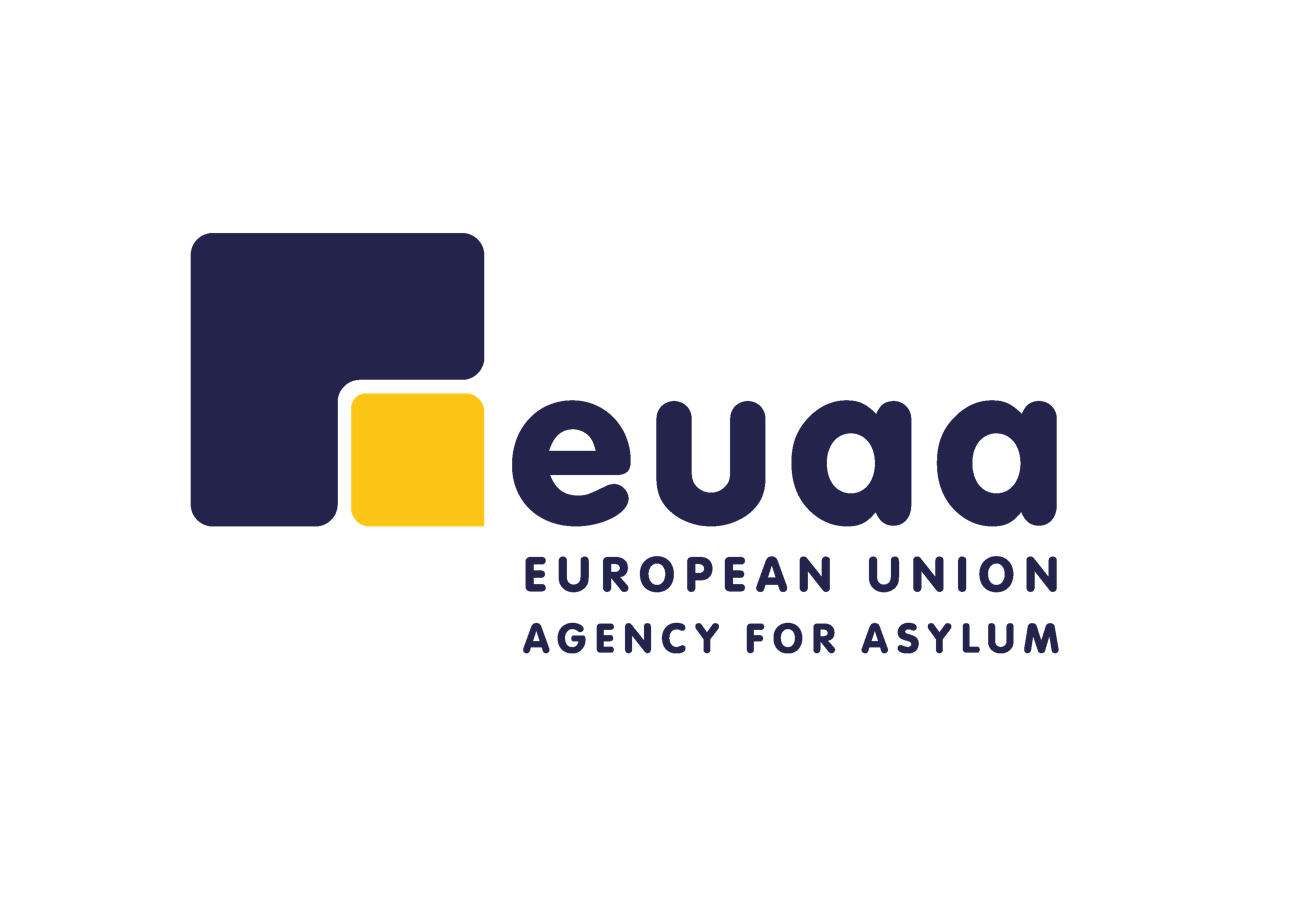

Agency overview
- Formed: 1 February 2011 (original); 19 January 2022 (as the European Union Agency for Asylum)
- Preceding agency: European Asylum Support Office (EASO)
- Jurisdiction: European Union
- Headquarters: Grand Harbour, Malta
- Motto: Support is Our Mission
- Employees: 424 (2022)
- Annual budget: €171.7 (2022)
- Agency executives: Nina Gregori, Executive Director; Mikael Ribbenvik Cassar, Deputy Executive Director
- Key document: EUAA Foundation Regulation (EU) No. 2021/2303
- Website: euaa.europa.eu

Map
- European Union Agency for Asylum (European Union)

The European Union Agency for Asylum (EUAA) is an agency created by European Union Regulation 439/2010 within the area of freedom, security and justice framework to increase the cooperation of EU member states on asylum, improve the implementation of the Common European Asylum System, and support member states under pressure.

== History ==
=== Founding ===
In 2008, the European Commission proposed the creation of European Asylum Support Office (EASO) to boost cooperation between member states in managing asylum requests.

On 30 November 2010 in Brussels, at the Justice and Home Affairs Council, Malta was officially selected to host the organisation, winning out over candidates Cyprus and Bulgaria.

The EASO regulation came into force on 19 June 2010 and was fully operational on 1 February 2011.

=== Operations ===
Between 2011 and 2014, EASO staff has doubled, from 42 to 84, and its annual budget increased from 8 to 14.5 million euros. Between 2015 and 2016 its budget increased more than threefold, from 16 million to 53 million euros, and its staff grew from 93 to 125 people.

The April 2015 Mediterranean Sea migrant shipwrecks led European leaders to reconsider their border control and migrant processing policies. On 20 April, the European Commission proposed a 10-point plan that included EASO in the process of assisting asylum applicants and collecting information about smuggling operations.

Following an unprecedented migrant influx, EASO in 2015 proposed a relocation programme that was agreed upon to support the 'frontline' Member States of Italy and Greece, who were under pressure.

"After a proposal made by the Commission in May 2015, the Council adopted two decisions – (EU) 2015/1523 and (EU) 2015/1601 respectively – establishing a temporary relocation mechanism for 160 000 applicants in need of international protection from Greece and Italy, to be implemented over two years until September 2017."

=== Proposed Transformation ===
In April 2016 the European Commission proposed to transform EASO into a European Union Agency for Asylum.

The May 2016 trend report, illustrates a 5% drop in applications for international protection since April to 99,000. However, the overall number of international protection applications in the first 6 months of 2016 has exceeded those in 2015, surpassing 500,000 as compared to 350,000 in 2015. The recent immigration crisis in Europe has seen most applications coming from conflict-heavy states like Syria, Afghanistan, and Iraq. Syria was seen to have the most applications in May with 28,056 persons claiming protection, followed by Afghanistan with 15,648, and Iraq with 10,341. However, recent trends show the slowing in momentum of applications from Syria.

Furthermore, given the asylum seeker crisis within Europe, the EASO should consider the 'pooling of reception places in times of emergency' to encourage an EU approach to asylum seekers.

Heijer and colleagues, have recommended that EASO should become the centralised organisation "encouraging more uniform decisions". They also argue that the EASO should lead more Asylum Officer training.

=== Controversy and fraud ===
In 2018, the European Anti-Fraud Office (OLAF) launched an investigation into alleged misconduct in procurement procedures, irregularities in management of human resources and possible breaches of data protection at EASO. Shortly after, executive director José Carreira stepped down amid the investigation as well as allegations of staff harassment, including "psychological violence".

=== A reinforced mandate: EUAA ===
As of the 19th of January 2022, EASO adopted a reinforced mandate to become the European Union Agency for Asylum (EUAA).

=== New anonymous allegations ===
Again in September 2022, an anonymous group of staff alleged serious fraud and nepotism to OLAF, the European Parliament, and the European Commission. Most senior managers, Nina Gregori, Mark Camilleri and Gerardo Knouse, amongst others, are accused of grave misconduct.

The Agency has vehemently denied the allegations, which have not been corroborated by any EU control body, to date.

== Management ==
=== Executive directors ===
- 2011–2015: Robert Visser
- 2016–2018: José Carreira
- 2018–2019: Jamil Addou (a.i.)
- 2019–present: Nina Gregori

== See also ==
- Area of freedom, security and justice
- European Border and Coast Guard Agency
- Common European Asylum System
- Asylum Migration and Integration Fund
- Migration policy of the European Union
- European Asylum Curriculum
- Political asylum
- Schengen Area
