= Migration and asylum policy of the European Union =

The migration and asylum policy of the European Union falls within the area of freedom, security and justice. It was established to develop and harmonise the principles and measures used by member states of the European Union (EU) to regulate migration processes and to manage matters related to asylum and refugee status within the EU.

== History and overview ==
The European Union gained the authority to legislate in the area of migration and asylum with the entry into force of the Treaty of Amsterdam on 1 May 1999. At the European Council meeting held in Tampere in October 1999, several legislative instruments establishing a Common European Asylum System (CEAS) were proposed. Central to these instruments was the adoption of the Dublin II Regulation, a recast of the Dublin Convention, an intergovernmental treaty agreed in 1990 outside the institutional framework of the European Union. By 2005, all legislative instruments of the first phase had been adopted.

Following the presentation of the Policy Plan on Asylum by the European Commission in June 2008, the legislative instruments of the first phase were reformed. The adoption of the recast directives and regulations was completed by 2013. The second phase also established the European Asylum Support Office.

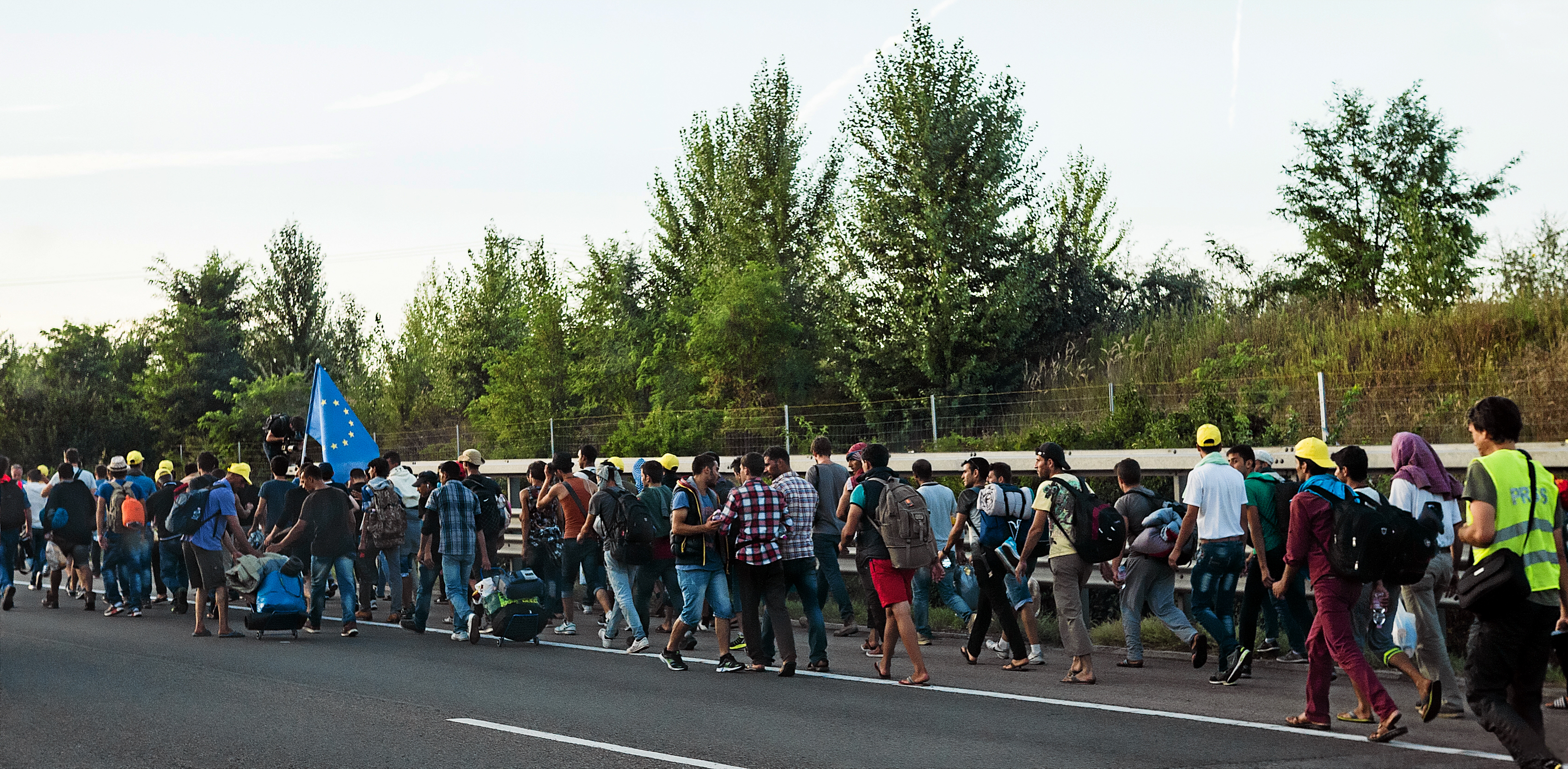
Migrants walking along the motorway from Hungary to Austria, 4 September 2015

Between May and July 2016, the European Commission proposed legislation for a third phase of the Common European Asylum System, in the aftermath of the 2015 European migrant crisis. In September 2020, these reforms were incorporated into the newly proposed Pact on Migration and Asylum. As of September 2023, the legislative instruments were in various stages of adoption.

The Dublin III Regulation is to be replaced by an Asylum and Migration Management Regulation (AMMR) as part of the third phase of the Common European Asylum System. The Justice and Home Affairs Council reached agreement on a negotiating position with the European Parliament on 8 June 2023, with implementation planned for June 2026.

A key element of the Asylum and Migration Management Regulation is the establishment of a new solidarity mechanism among member states. Solidarity may take the form of relocation of migrants, financial contributions, deployment of personnel, or measures aimed at capacity building. Solidarity will be mandatory for member states, but the type of contribution is left to their discretion. In lieu of relocation, member states may instead make a financial contribution of €20,000 per person.

=== Guiding principles ===
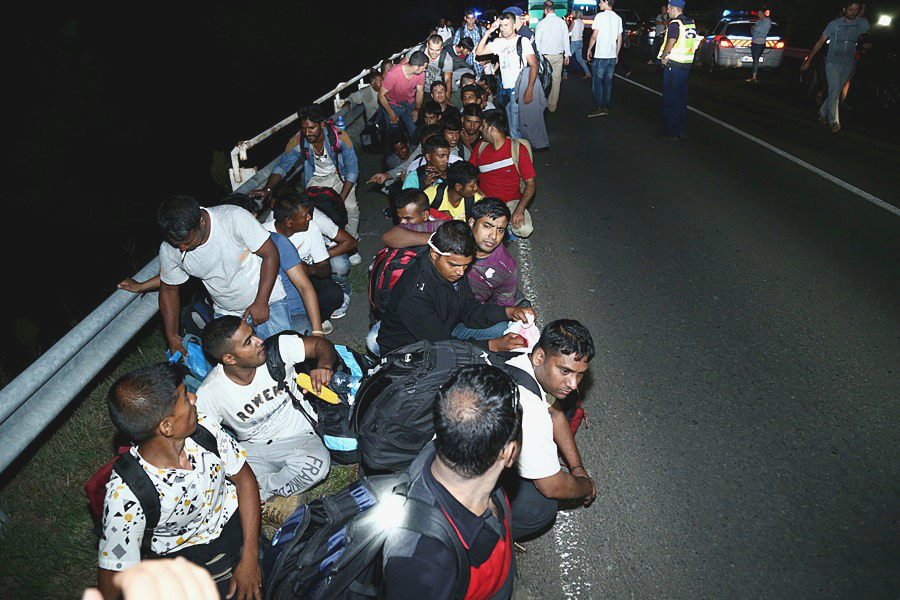
Migrants along the Western Balkan route crossing from Serbia into Hungary, 24 August 2015

The migration policy of the European Union is rooted in the 1951 Convention Relating to the Status of Refugees, an agreement founded on Article 14 of the Universal Declaration of Human Rights. The current legal bases for the EU's creation of a harmonised legislative framework on asylum are found in the Treaty on the Functioning of the European Union and the Charter of Fundamental Rights of the European Union.

The EU complies with the 1951 Convention, which is the principal international instrument defining the status and rights of refugees. Under its key provisions, states are responsible for safeguarding the rights and freedoms of internally displaced persons and refugees, while ensuring that legal protections apply equally to all foreign nationals arriving in their territory.

In response to the high number of migrants arriving during the 2015 migration crisis, the European Union has continued to develop an effective migration policy. One of its key principles is solidarity, reflected in respect for fundamental rights and in the coordination of political and social efforts to address migration-related challenges.

The development and functioning of migration policy relies on collecting data on the current situation, including statistics on the number of legal and irregular migrants crossing the borders of the European Union. Although migration policy is determined internally, it also has an international dimension due to its connection with cross-border movement. Consequently, international events directly influence the evolution of EU migration policy.

In 2020, the European Commission, at the request of the European Parliament, proposed a series of reforms to the existing system through a comprehensive approach built on three main pillars:

1. Efficient asylum and return procedures.
2. Solidarity and fair sharing of responsibility.
3. Strengthened partnerships with third countries.

=== New Pact on Migration and Asylum ===
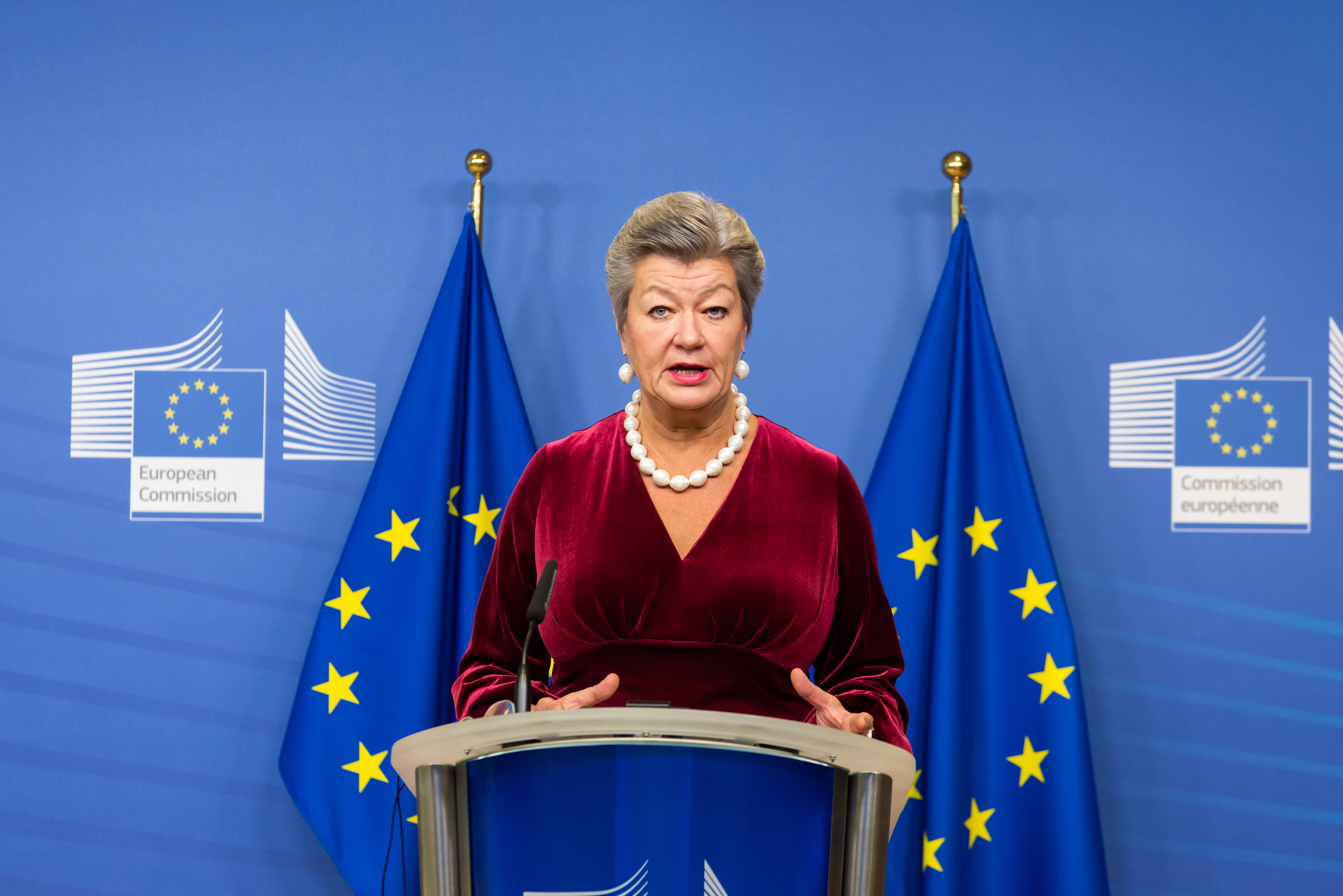
European Commissioner Ylva Johansson warned member states of potential legal consequences if they fail to enforce the Pact.

The New Pact on Migration and Asylum, also known as the EU Migration Pact or the EU Asylum and Migration Pact, is a set of new European Union rules concerning migration entered into force in June 2026. The Pact requires member states to more evenly share responsibility for hosting migrants and reforms EU asylum and border security procedures, among other measures.

The agreement was reached on 20 December 2023 between representatives of the European Parliament and the Council of the European Union. It passed the European Parliament on 10 April 2024 and was approved by the Council on 14 May 2024.

Under the Pact, member states where migrants first arrive will be able to relocate up to 30,000 people per year to other EU countries under a "mandatory solidarity mechanism". The Pact has been criticised by some right-wing politicians for not going far enough to deter irregular migration, including concerns about the absence of stronger provisions on returns. Slovak Prime Minister Robert Fico called for a stronger return policy, stating that "out of 100% of illegal migrants who arrive in Europe, 80% stay there, and only 20% we manage to get back".

Several human rights organisations, including Oxfam, Caritas, Amnesty International and Save the Children, criticised the Pact in an open letter, arguing that it would create a "cruel system". More than 200 academics from 66 predominantly European universities described the Pact as "inhumane" and urged the European Parliament and the Council to reassess their approach.

The Pact resulted in the following legislation:

- Directive (EU) 2024/1346 (reception conditions directive)
- Regulation (EU) 2024/1347 (qualification regulation)
- Regulation (EU) 2024/1348 (asylum procedure regulation)
- Regulation (EU) 2024/1349 (return border procedure regulation)
- Regulation (EU) 2024/1350 (resettlement and humanitarian admission framework)
- Regulation (EU) 2024/1351 (asylum and migration management regulation)
- Regulation (EU) 2024/1352 (consistency amendments related to screening)
- Regulation (EU) 2024/1356 (screening regulation)
- Regulation (EU) 2024/1358 (Eurodac regulation)
- Regulation (EU) 2024/1359 (crisis and force majeure regulation)

== Legal framework ==
=== Common European Asylum System ===
Since 1999, refugees entering Europe have been subject to the rules established under the Common European Asylum System (CEAS). These rules were designed to prevent EU member states from returning individuals to places where they may face persecution and to provide international protection to those granted refugee status. However, member states retain discretion regarding the procedures for granting and withdrawing international protection.

==== Asylum Procedures Directive ====
The Asylum Procedures Directive (APD) establishes a common procedure for granting and withdrawing international protection.

The original directive was adopted on 1 December 2005. A recast version followed on 26 June 2013 as part of the second phase of CEAS.

As part of the third phase of CEAS, the directive is set to be replaced by an Asylum Procedure Regulation (APR). The Justice and Home Affairs Council agreed on a negotiating position towards the European Parliament on 8 June 2023.

A key component of the proposed regulation is the introduction of a new border procedure. This procedure may be applied when an individual applies for asylum at an external border crossing point, is apprehended following an irregular border crossing, or is rescued during a search and rescue operation. Individuals subject to the border procedure are treated as if they have not yet entered the member state's territory. The procedure will be mandatory for applicants considered a threat to national security or public order, for those who have misled authorities, or for applicants from countries with a recognition rate below 20%.

==== Reception Conditions Directive ====
The Reception Conditions Directive (RCD) ensures minimum standards for the reception of applicants for international protection across the EU.

The original directive was adopted on 27 January 2003. A recast version was adopted on 26 June 2013 as part of the second phase of CEAS.

As part of the third phase of CEAS, another recast of the directive has been proposed. The Justice and Home Affairs Council reached agreement on its negotiating position on 20 December 2022.

==== Qualification Directive ====
The Qualification Directive sets out who qualifies for refugee status or subsidiary protection, and the rights associated with each status.

The original directive was adopted on 29 April 2004. A recast version was adopted on 13 December 2011 as part of the second phase of CEAS.

In the third phase of CEAS, the directive is to be replaced by a Qualification Regulation. The Justice and Home Affairs Council reached agreement on a negotiating position on 20 December 2022.

==== Dublin Regulation ====
The Dublin Regulation determines which Member State is responsible for examining an asylum application.

The original Dublin Regulation was adopted on 27 January 2003 as part of the first phase of CEAS, replacing the 1990 Dublin Convention and therefore commonly referred to as the Dublin II Regulation.

In the second phase of CEAS, the Dublin III Regulation was adopted on 26 June 2013.

As part of the third phase, the regulation is set to be replaced by the Asylum and Migration Management Regulation (AMMR). The Justice and Home Affairs Council agreed on a negotiating position on 8 June 2023.

The AMMR introduces a new solidarity mechanism among Member States. Solidarity may take the form of relocating migrants, financial contributions, personnel deployment or capacity-building measures. Participation in solidarity is mandatory, but Member States may choose the form of contribution. In place of relocation, Member States may instead make a financial contribution of €20,000 per person.

==== Eurodac Regulation ====
The Eurodac Regulation establishes a database used for collecting, transmitting and comparing fingerprints. It is a key component of the Dublin system, helping determine which Member State is responsible for an asylum application.

Eurodac was first established by Council Regulation 2725/2000 of 11 December 2000. A recast Eurodac Regulation was adopted on 16 June 2013 as part of the second phase of CEAS.

A further recast was proposed by the European Commission on 4 May 2016 as part of the third phase of CEAS.

=== Temporary Protection Directive ===
In 2001, during the first phase of CEAS, the Temporary Protection Directive was adopted. It enables the European Union to grant immediate and temporary protection in the event of a mass influx of displaced persons from non-EU countries. This temporary protection operates separately from the standard asylum procedures under CEAS.

=== Proposed legislation ===
==== Union Resettlement Framework Regulation ====
Following the significant migrant influx in 2015, EASO proposed a relocation programme to support the ‘frontline’ Member States of Italy and Greece.

"After a proposal made by the Commission in May 2015, the Council adopted two decisions – (EU) 2015/1523 and (EU) 2015/1601 respectively – establishing a temporary relocation mechanism for 160,000 applicants in need of international protection from Greece and Italy, to be implemented over two years until September 2017."

Negotiations on a permanent Union Resettlement Framework Regulation are ongoing. The Justice and Home Affairs Council reached agreement on a negotiating position on 20 December 2022.

==== Crisis and Force Majeure Regulation ====
The Commission proposed a Crisis and Force Majeure Regulation on 23 September 2020. The Justice and Home Affairs Council on 28 September 2023 did not reach agreement on a negotiating position. However, the Spanish presidency indicated confidence that a mandate could be agreed upon soon.

== Agencies and funds ==
=== European Union Agency for Asylum ===
Reforms implemented following the 2015 European migrant crisis culminated in the establishment of the European Union Agency for Asylum on 19 January 2022. The agency aims to promote greater convergence in the asylum and reception practices of member states and ensure that high EU standards guide these processes. It replaced the European Asylum Support Office (EASO), which had been investigated by the European Anti-Fraud Office (OLAF) for alleged misconduct, data protection breaches and other charges.

=== European Border and Coast Guard Agency ===
The European Union's border management agency, the European Border and Coast Guard Agency (Frontex), provides a reserve of border guards and technical equipment.

The agency may acquire its own flagged vehicles, and member states in which such equipment is registered (including larger assets such as patrol vessels and aircraft) are required to make it available to the agency when needed. This enables rapid deployment of technical equipment for border operations. A rapid reserve pool of border guards and a technical equipment pool are also maintained to address shortages in staff and resources for the agency's activities. The agency can launch joint operations, including the use of drones, when required. The European Space Agency's Copernicus earth observation system provides near real-time satellite surveillance capabilities, complementing the existing Eurosur border surveillance system.

Frontex regularly publishes analyses on border control developments, irregular border crossings and various forms of cross-border crime. Its founding regulation tasks the agency with carrying out risk analyses "in order to provide the Community and the Member States with adequate information to allow for appropriate measures to be taken or to tackle identified threats and risks with a view to improving the integrated management of external borders". The agency's Risk Analysis Unit (RAU) and the Frontex Risk Analysis Network (FRAN) coordinate intelligence and risk assessment activities in cooperation with security experts from member states.

=== Asylum, Migration and Integration Fund ===
The Asylum, Migration and Integration Fund (AMIF) is a funding programme managed by the Directorate-General for Migration and Home Affairs of the European Commission. It supports the effective management of migration flows and the implementation, strengthening and development of a common approach to asylum and immigration across the European Union.

According to Article 3 of the establishing regulation, the objectives of the Asylum, Migration and Integration Fund are:

1. To strengthen and further develop the Common European Asylum System (CEAS);
2. To promote the integration of third-country nationals and to finance the relocation of individuals not accepted by member states;
3. To support fair return procedures in order to address irregular migration;
4. To enhance solidarity among member states through a proportional distribution of resources based on their exposure to migration flows.

In addition to project funding, the programme also supports the activities and future development of the European Migration Network.

== Efficacy ==
According to data published by the UNHCR, hostilities in Syria resulted in almost 22% of the country's population—an estimated four million people—becoming refugees or internally displaced persons by early 2015.

Following the introduction of new EU policies, the number of migrants decreased in 2017. During the first quarter of that year, the number of immigrants and refugees was 35% of that recorded in the first quarter of 2016. However, critics argue that the decline resulted from large numbers of people emigrating to Greece before the implementation of the EU–Turkey agreement, rather than from the policy changes themselves.

== Main issues related to EU migration policy ==
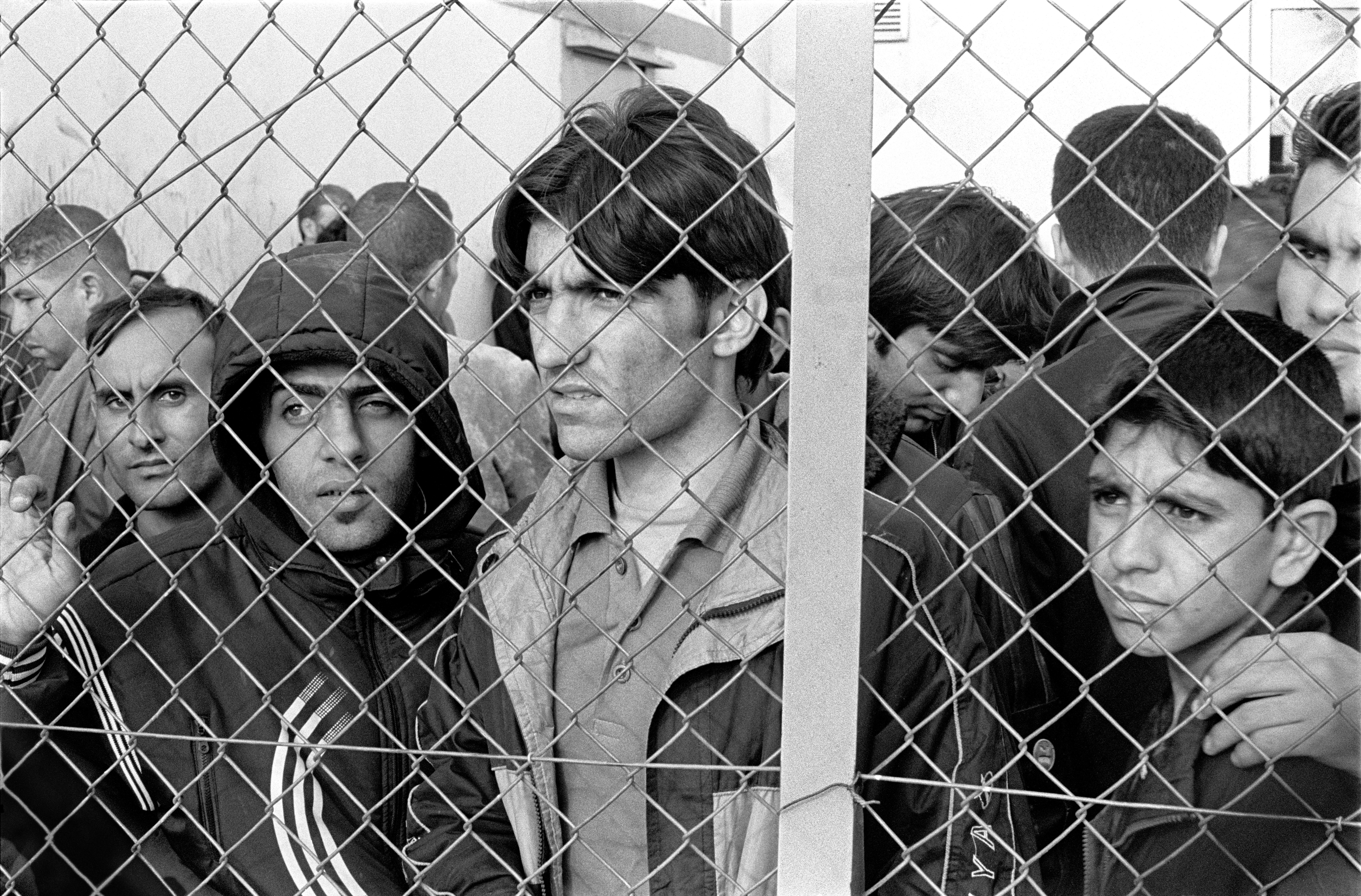
At the Fylakio Detention Center in Evros, Greece

=== Socio-political issues ===
The crisis contributed to rising concerns among segments of the EU population, including fears of Islamization—understood by some as pressure, either political or through acts of Islamic terrorism, to impose social, moral, legal and cultural norms associated with Islam at the expense of local norms. Additional concerns include the emergence of parallel societies, with claims that some neighbourhoods have become so-called no-go areas where linguistic and cultural integration is limited, and where informal norms enforced by community groups may conflict with national law.

Such sentiments have been influenced not only by attention to areas such as Molenbeek-Saint-Jean but also by a sharp increase in attacks attributed to jihadists in the European Union. The number of such attacks rose from four in 2014 to seventeen in 2015, while fatalities increased from four to 150. Other events, such as the 2015–16 New Year's Eve sexual assaults in Germany, although unrelated to terrorism, heightened public concern regarding social integration. Criticism also arose in response to perceived attempts by authorities and some media outlets to downplay or delay reporting on the events, which undermined public trust in coverage of sensitive issues.

These concerns have influenced political discourse across the EU. Some politicians have sought to capitalise on or amplify public anxieties by opposing the reception of migrants, citing security considerations related to Islamic terrorism in Europe, as well as perceived economic, social, cultural and religious risks associated with large-scale migration. In several EU member states, previously marginalised elements of the far right have gained increased visibility in mainstream politics. Supporters of the EU’s migration and asylum policies, including representatives of the European Commission and several member states, emphasise the need to uphold international obligations and prioritise the security and rights of migrants.

In September 2022, Finland, Poland, and the Baltic states announced they would deny entry and refuse humanitarian visas or asylum to Russian citizens fleeing the 2022 Russian mobilization. Estonian Prime Minister Kaja Kallas stated that Estonia would not grant asylum to Russians fleeing conscription, maintaining that "every citizen is responsible for the actions of their state" and that they should oppose the war domestically. As of 2024, France was the only EU member state to admit Russian deserters lacking valid travel documents and permit them to apply for asylum.

Following the February 2022 Russian invasion of Ukraine and the subsequent travel restrictions imposed on men aged 18 to 60 under the 2022 Ukrainian mobilization, which were later narrowed to ages 23 to 60, tens of thousands of Ukrainian men have evaded conscription by illegally crossing into neighbouring European Union member states, often undertaking hazardous transits through the Carpathian Mountains and across the Tisza River that have resulted in numerous rescues and fatalities. According to Romanian border police, more than 30,000 Ukrainian men have entered the country illegally since the start of the conflict, with Romanian authorities granting them temporary protection status under European Union measures. In June 2026, Ursula von der Leyen signaled plans to alter the terms of the Temporary Protection Directive, with EU member states debating the exclusion of new arrivals of draft-age Ukrainian men aged 23 to 60 to avoid undermining Ukraine's self-defense capacity.

In July 2026, the Council of the European Union made compliance with military obligations in Ukraine a condition for newly granted temporary protection to displaced Ukrainians. The new rule took effect on 5 August.

=== Fortress Europe ===
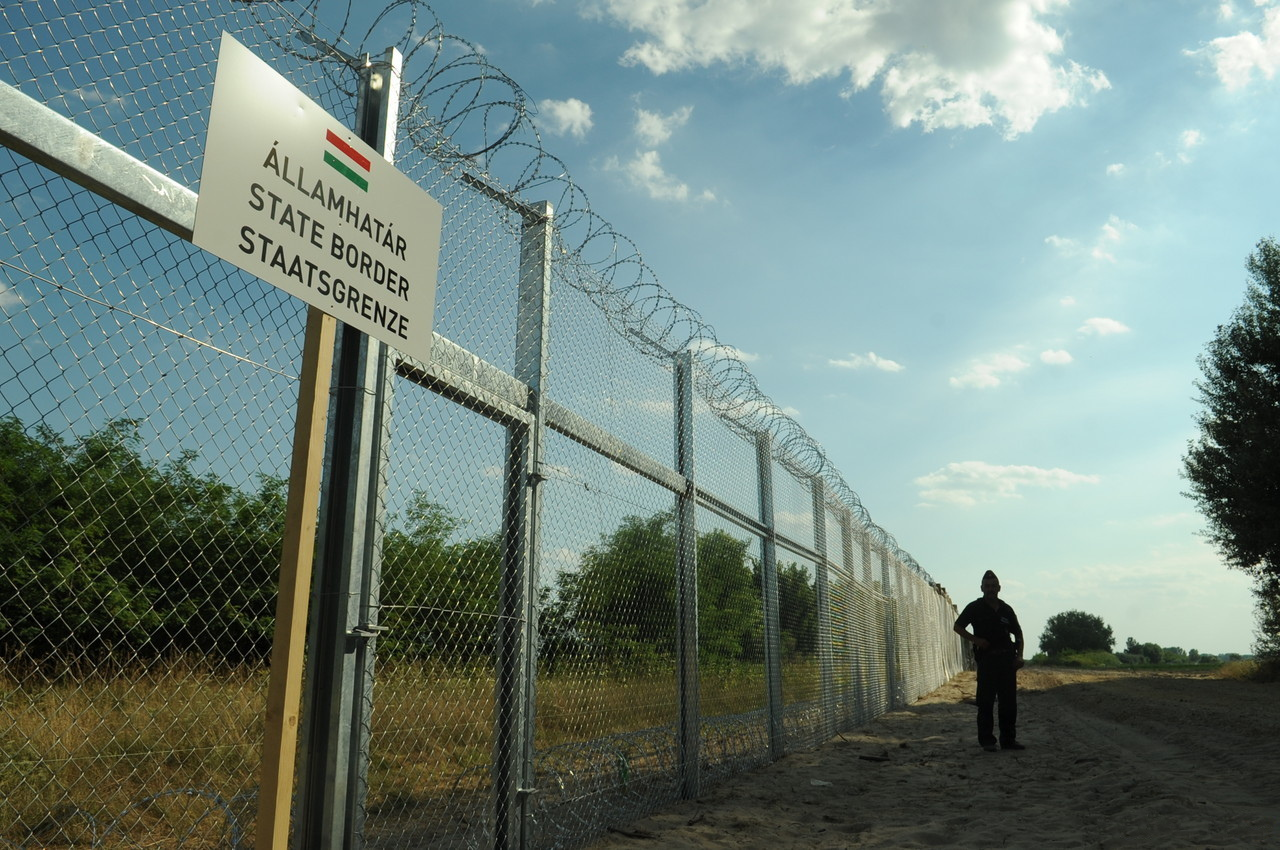
Hungarian border barrier

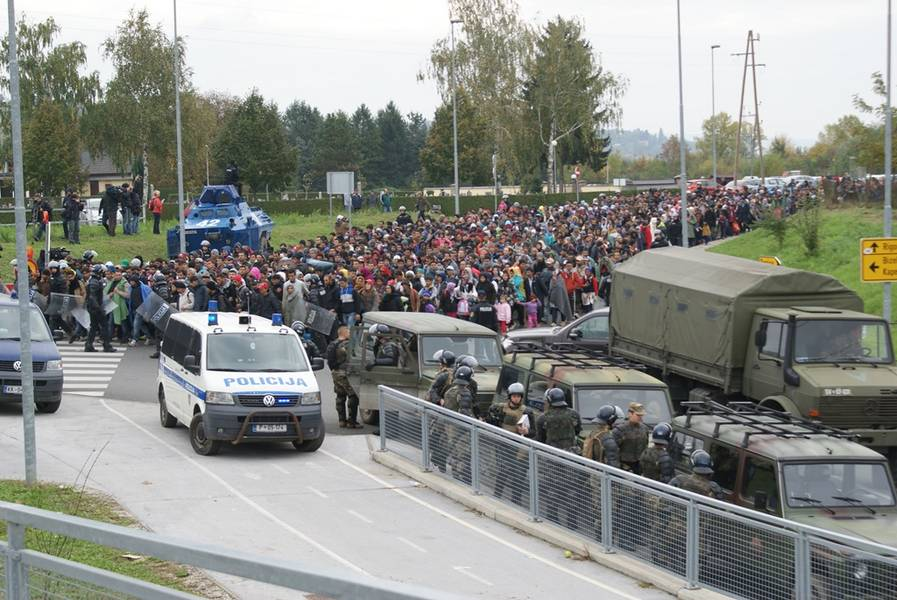
Arrival of migrants in Dobova, Slovenia, 22 October 2015

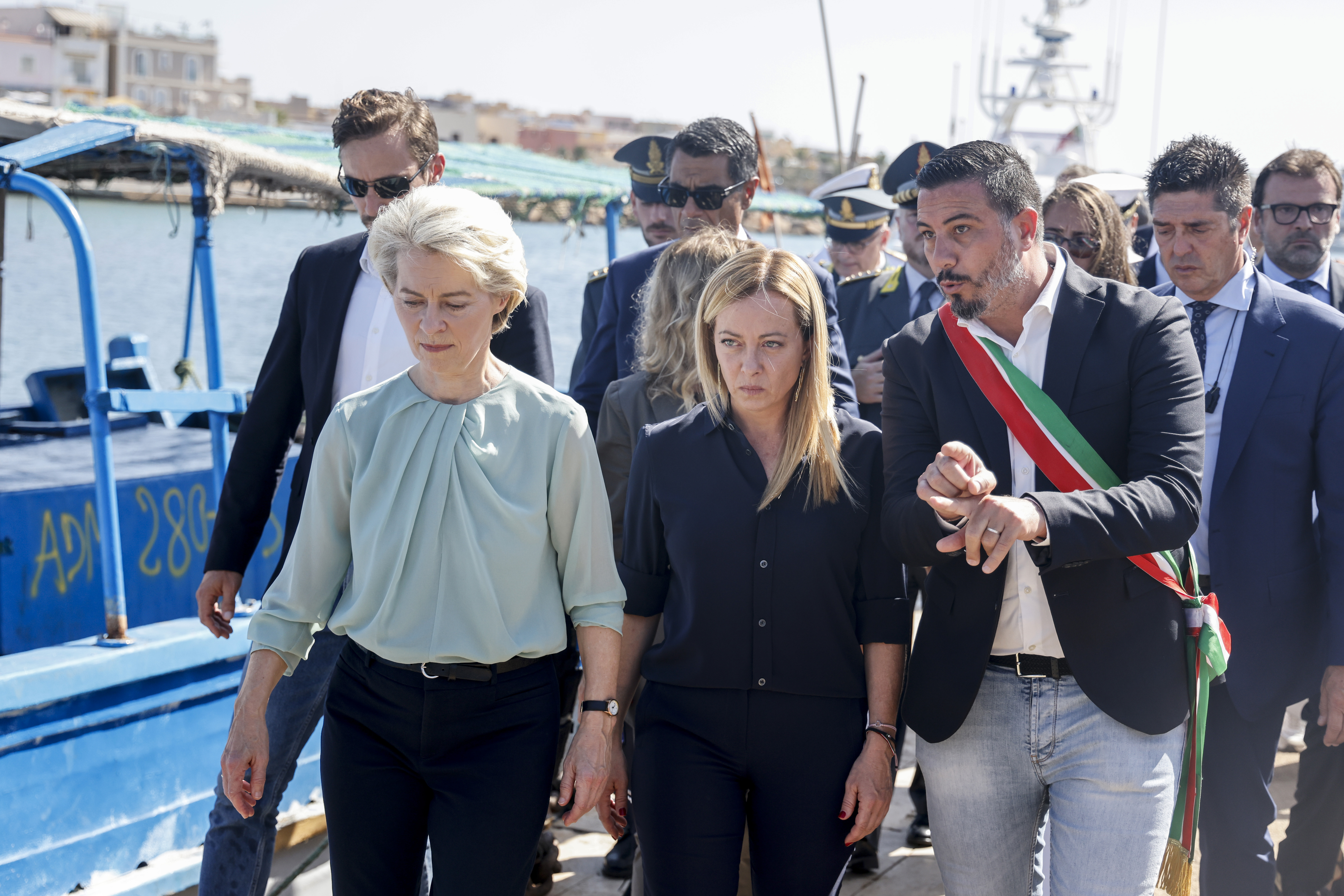
European Commission President Ursula von der Leyen and Italian Prime Minister Giorgia Meloni visiting the migrant hotspot in Lampedusa, 2023

During the migration crisis, the EU's approach increasingly shifted toward surveillance and securitisation. One early step was the termination of Operation Mare Nostrum in 2014 and its replacement with Operation Triton. By 2016, the EU had begun externalising border control through a €3 billion agreement with Turkey. In 2017, EU migration policy was further tightened. At a summit held in Brussels on 19 October 2017, EU leaders emphasised the need to consolidate efforts to ensure full control over the Union's external borders.

Since 2017, humanitarian NGOs conducting search and rescue (SAR) operations in the Mediterranean have increasingly faced restrictions and criminal investigations by some EU member states, including the arrest of ship captains and the seizure of vessels. These actions prompted international criticism and accusations that the EU was neglecting its responsibilities regarding SAR operations. Critics argue that impediments to NGO activities have contributed to migrant deaths at sea, contradicting stated EU commitments to protecting refugees and migrants. Despite these challenges, humanitarian NGOs continue to conduct SAR operations in the Mediterranean.

Another notable development has been the construction of numerous border barriers along the external borders of the Schengen Area.

The conclusions of the European Council have also emphasised readiness to prevent irregular border crossings, including through the return of asylum applicants to neighbouring countries such as Ukraine, Turkey, or Russia, where refugee-status determination systems have been criticised as inadequate. The Roma rights organisation Chachipe has criticised EU asylum policy under the "safe country of origin" doctrine, arguing that Roma from the former Yugoslavia face discrimination in their home countries.

Human rights considerations have increasingly come into tension with security measures, and the EU has struggled to balance the two. Policies in several member states have become more stringent toward migrants perceived as violating public order or imposing incompatible social norms. Critics argue that such measures may lead to broader restrictions affecting all migrants, and some express concern that these restrictions could eventually extend to the general population if normalised.

=== Use of migrants as weapons in hybrid warfare ===
Following the deterioration of Belarus–European Union relations, Belarusian president Alexander Lukashenko threatened around 7 July 2021 to "flood" the European Union (EU) with human traffickers, drug smugglers, and armed migrants. Subsequently, Belarusian authorities and state-controlled tourist companies, together with several airlines operating in the Middle East, began promoting tours to Belarus by increasing flight connections from the region and issuing Belarusian visas, ostensibly for hunting trips. Social media groups also circulated misleading advice on border-crossing procedures to prospective migrants, many of whom aimed to reach Germany.

According to migrant testimonies, Belarusian authorities provided instructions on where and how to trespass the European Union border, including guidance on what to say to border guards once inside EU territory. Some migrants stated that Belarus supplied tools such as wire cutters and axes to breach border fences; however, those who failed to cross were often forced to remain near the border by Belarusian authorities, who were accused of assaulting some migrants. Belarus later acknowledged that involvement by its border troops was "absolutely possible". Belarus also refused to allow Polish humanitarian aid to reach the migrants, including tents and sleeping bags.

Poland, Lithuania and Latvia characterised the situation as hybrid warfare, describing it as an incident of state-facilitated human trafficking aimed at destabilising the EU. In response, all three countries declared states of emergency and announced plans to construct border barriers on their frontiers with Belarus. Poland approved approximately €353 million to build a 60 kilometres (37 mi) fence. The EU deployed additional border officers and patrol vehicles to Lithuania, and 12 EU governments publicly expressed support for constructing a physical barrier along the EU's external border.

Comparable actions, though smaller-scale, were attributed to Turkey during the 2020 Greek–Turkish border crisis and to Morocco during the 2021 Morocco–Spain border incident.

In February 2016, Turkish president Recep Tayyip Erdoğan warned that Turkey could send the millions of refugees hosted in the country to EU member states, stating: "We can open the doors to Greece and Bulgaria anytime and we can put the refugees on buses ... So how will you deal with refugees if you don't get a deal? Kill the refugees?"

In March 2025, Poland suspended the right to apply for asylum at the Belarus–Poland border, a move that received support from the European Commission.

=== Externalization of the asylum procedures ===
The externalization of asylum procedures, sometimes known as border externalization, is a migration policy pursued by several countries of the European Union (EU). It involves relocating the reception and accommodation of asylum seekers, as well as the processing of their asylum applications, to areas near the EU's external borders or to countries outside the EU from which asylum seekers originate or through which they transit.

Following attempts in the early 2000s to relocate asylum procedures to centres at the EU's borders, these policies contributed, from 2003 onward, to an expansion of exile camps in and around the EU. They also placed pressure on neighbouring countries to develop systems capable of examining asylum claims within their territories and were associated with a tightening of migration policies both in neighbouring states and within the EU itself.

As part of the externalization of asylum procedures, Italy and Albania signed a migration protocol in November 2023 granting Italy jurisdiction to operate two migrant facilities on Albanian territory for at least five years, a policy implemented in 2024 that by October 2025 had led to the detention of only a limited number of migrants, most of whom were returned to Italy following judicial decisions. The detention centre in Gjadër has been criticised by politicians and human rights observers for its lack of transparency, prison-like conditions, and serious risks to detainees’ mental health, including reports of frequent self-harm, suicide attempts, and inadequate access to legal and medical safeguards.

=== Migration deals ===
The EU has made 'cash for migrants' deals with Turkey, Libya, Tunisia, Mauritania, Morocco, Albania, Egypt, and Lebanon (in red).

The European Union has concluded aid packages with several countries in exchange for cooperation on preventing irregular migration and, in some cases, for the externalization of migration and asylum procedures.

=== Asylum shopping ===
In the terminology of European institutions, asylum shopping refers to the practice of asylum seekers attempting to lodge an application in a country other than the one designated by existing regulations, often selecting the state that offers the most favourable reception conditions or submitting a new application after a previous rejection. The term is used to describe certain asylum seekers in analogy with consumers of welfare provisions.

This understanding appears in official documents, media coverage, and academic analyses. A major factor influencing asylum seekers' choice of destination is the variation in asylum laws across EU Member States; some states grant refugee status to the majority of applicants, while others accept fewer than 1%. In 2017, Maria Teresa Rivera became the first woman known to receive asylum on the grounds of being wrongfully imprisoned under an abortion ban. She had been convicted in El Salvador and was granted asylum in Sweden.

According to former European Commissioner for Justice Franco Frattini, approximately 12% of asylum seekers engage in asylum shopping. The implementation of the Dublin Regulation has considerably limited this practice. Under the Regulation, asylum seekers are generally required to apply for protection in the first EU Member State they enter. Those wishing to apply elsewhere may be transferred back to their initial point of entry.

=== Disparities between Member States ===
National governments' position on 22 September 2015 European Union Justice and Home Affairs Council majority vote to relocate 120,000 refugees from Greece and Italy to other EU countries according to proportional quotas: Yes Opt-out Abstention No Non-EU state *Malta not seen/marked on map

Number of asylum applications in 2023

Country	Total number	Per million inhabitants
Austria	58,686	6,446
Belgium	35,248	2,999
Bulgaria	22,519	3,493
Croatia	1,747	454
Cyprus	11,731	12,741
Czechia	1,397	129
Denmark	2,427	409
Estonia	3,981	2,915
Finland	5,372	965
France	167,002	2,453
Germany	334,109	3,961
Greece	64,084	6,165
Hungary	31	8
Ireland	13,278	2,556
Italy	136,138	2,313
Latvia	1,701	903
Lithuania	575	201
Luxembourg	2,504	3,789
Malta	729	1,345
Netherlands	39,550	2,221
Norway	5,497	1,001
Poland	9,519	259
Portugal	1,998	191
Romania	10,132	532
Slovakia	416	77
Slovenia	7,261	3,430
Spain	162,439	3,380
Sweden	12,309	1,170
Switzerland	30,238	3,431

Neither the readmission system under the Dublin Regulation nor the temporary relocation mechanism based on quotas proved effective in all EU Member States.

The Dublin Regulation has led to a disproportionate number of asylum applications in border states such as Greece, Slovakia, Poland, and Malta. In 2008, the UNHCR requested that the European Union refrain from returning Iraqi asylum seekers to Greece due to concerns over reception conditions. Beginning in 2015, several European countries unilaterally closed their borders, detaining people at the EU's external and internal borders for additional screening of their migration intentions. These measures were criticised for undermining solidarity among Schengen Area states and for violating the Dublin Regulation's procedures for examining applications for international protection.

In the autumn of 2015, the Czech Republic, together with Hungary, Romania, and Slovakia, voted against the mandatory admission of refugees allocated under relocation quotas. The Czech authorities later agreed to comply with EU requirements under pressure from other Member States. Although the Czech Republic was expected to accept around 2,000 asylum seekers, it ultimately admitted 12. A spokesperson for Czech President Miloš Zeman stated: "Our country simply cannot afford to risk terrorist attacks like those that occurred in France and Germany. By accepting migrants, we would create fertile ground for barbaric attacks". During the same period, Western Europe experienced several major terrorist attacks, including the November 2015 Paris attacks (130 deaths), the July 2016 Nice truck attack (86 deaths), the June 2016 Atatürk Airport attack (45 deaths), and the March 2016 Brussels bombings (32 deaths). In contrast, the recorded terrorist threat level in Poland in 2015 was at "zero" on its national scale, which includes four levels plus a "zero level".

According to 2017 statistics, Malta and Luxembourg admitted the highest number of migrants per capita among EU Member States, with an average of 41–46 migrants per 1,000 inhabitants. In contrast, the Czech Republic, Croatia, Bulgaria, and Slovakia admitted fewer than five migrants per 1,000 inhabitants.

== History of migration in Europe ==
Number of asylum applications 1998–2019. The surge in 2015–16 was driven largely by people fleeing the civil war in Syria, a related civil war in Iraq and a Taliban resurgence in Afghanistan.

=== 1985–2015 ===
Following the adoption of the 1985 Schengen Agreement and the 1990 Schengen Convention on the elimination of internal border controls between signatory states, and their subsequent incorporation into the EU legislative framework by the 1997 Amsterdam Treaty, the EU set an objective to introduce "appropriate measures" concerning asylum. The Treaty required the Council of the European Union to adopt asylum-related measures in accordance with the Geneva Convention and the Protocol Relating to the Status of Refugees by 2004, five years after the Treaty of Amsterdam entered into force.

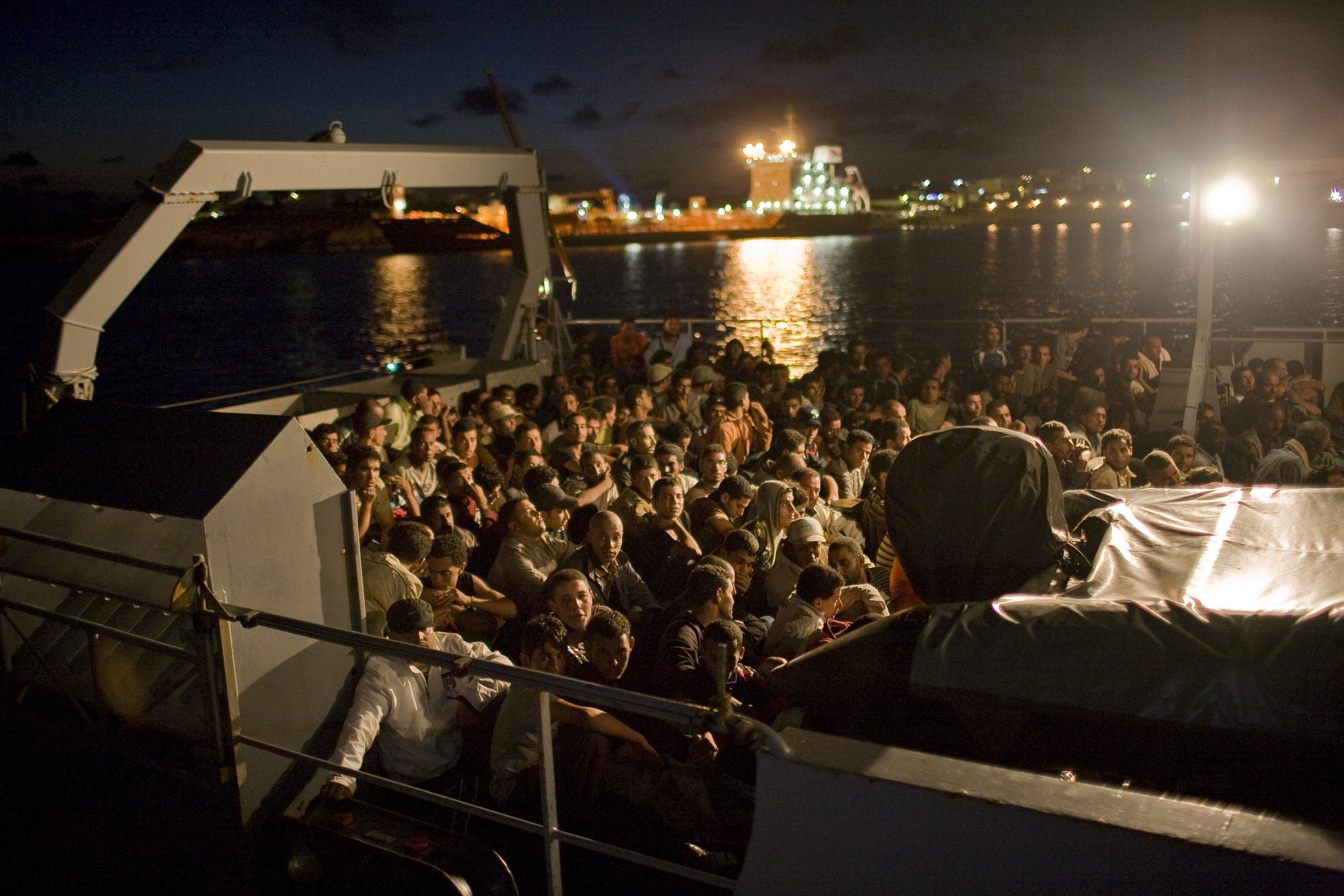
Detained migrants in Lampedusa, Italy, 24 September 2008

Refugee applications in EU Member States have generally reflected conflicts occurring elsewhere in the world. In the 1990s, large numbers of refugees from the Yugoslav Wars sought asylum in Europe. In the 2010s, millions more fled wars in Syria, Afghanistan and Iraq.

More than 34,000 migrants and refugees have died attempting to reach Europe since 1993, most commonly due to vessel capsizing while crossing the Mediterranean and Aegean Seas.

During the 2000s, most European states adopted more restrictive asylum and migration policies, ostensibly to combat fraud. Measures included the UK's UK Borders Act 2007, the Netherlands' Aliens Act of April 2001, Italy's Bossi–Fini Act of July 2002, and several French laws such as the Law of 24 July 2006 on immigration and integration and the Law of 20 November 2007 on the control of immigration, integration and asylum. These policies reduced the proportion of asylum seekers granted refugee status.

Between 4 and 7 May 2009, as part of the first reading of four codecision acts, Members of the European Parliament voted on what was described as an "asylum package". The package included a proposed revision of the "reception" directive and a proposal to improve the Dublin system. The European Commission also proposed revising the regulations governing Eurodac (the EU biometric database) and creating a European Asylum Support Office (EASO), funded partly through reallocations from the European Refugee Fund, to assist Member States with managing asylum applications. doctrine, as they face discrimination in their home countries.

=== Changes of 2015 ===
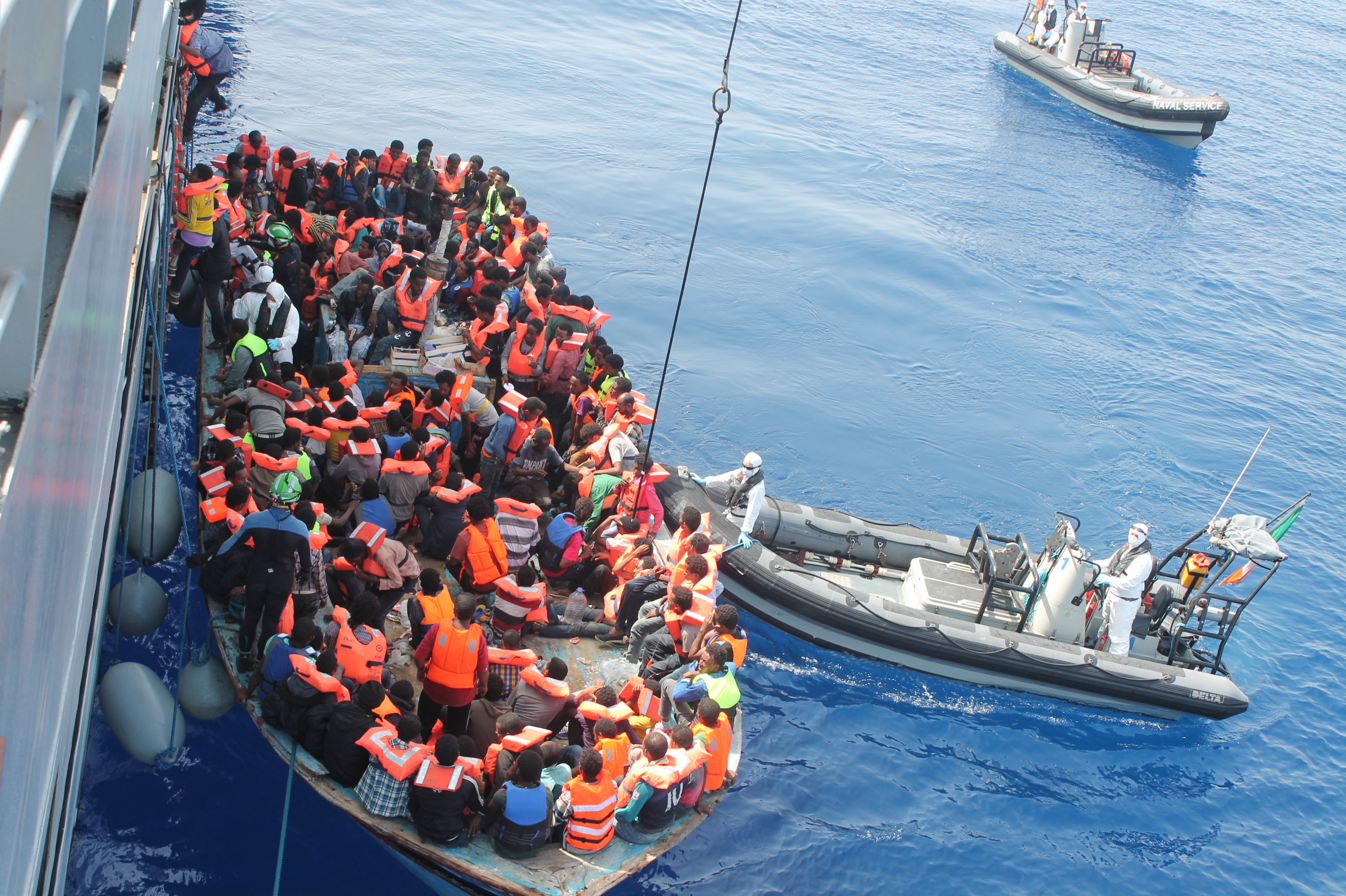
Rescued male migrants are brought to southern Italian ports, 28 June 2015

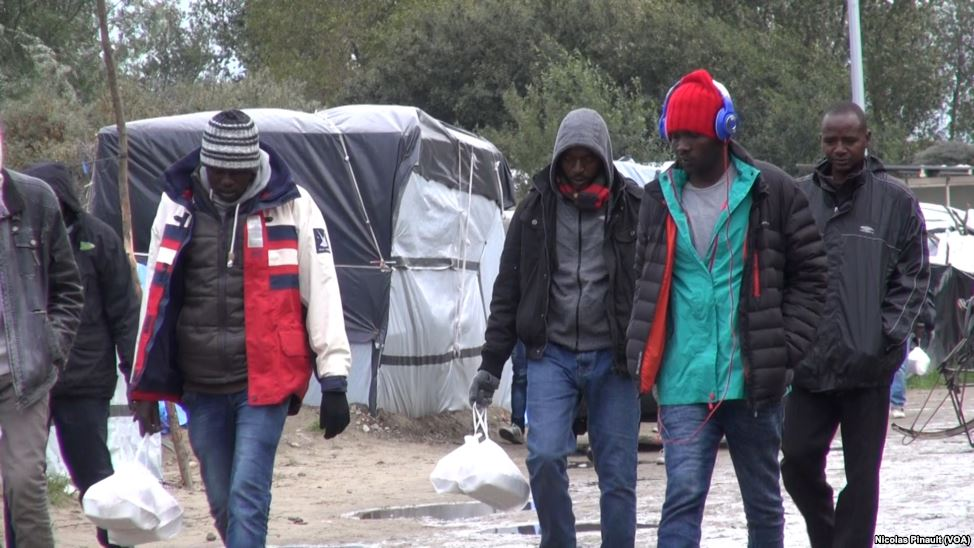
Sudanese migrants in the Calais Jungle in France, 21 October 2015

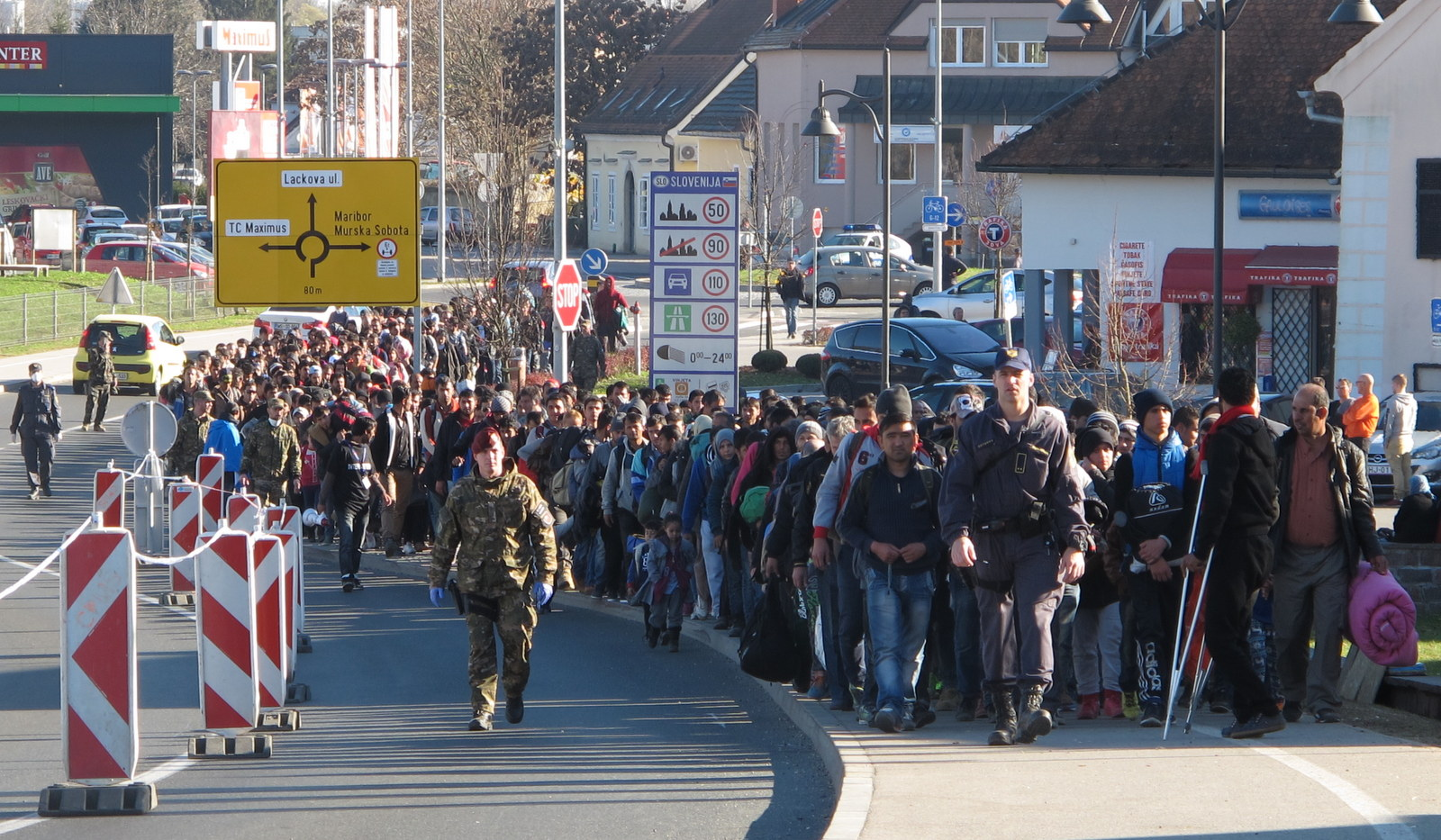
Migrants at the Austria–Slovenia border crossing, 13 November 2015

The 2015 European migrant crisis, which brought over a million refugees fleeing war, political instability, and poverty, highlighted the shortcomings of the existing system and demonstrated the need for reform. The unequal distribution of administrative responsibilities among member states exposed weaknesses in the Common European Asylum System (CEAS).

In response, the European Commission proposed measures to improve EU migration policy. This included an Action Plan to Combat Smuggling of Migrants for 2015–2020, which aimed to strengthen law enforcement and judicial activities, improve the collection and exchange of information on migrants, and enhance cooperation with non-EU countries to combat irregular migration. Measures were also taken to block migration routes through the Western Balkans and prioritize legal migration channels originating in Turkey.

The policy assumptions included the following: participating countries would halt irregular passage of migrants and refugees through their territories; strict entry controls would be enforced at EU external borders; Greece would receive substantial financial support for accommodating high migration flows; and an agreement with Ankara would ensure that Turkey would prevent irregular migration to Europe while accepting the return of migrants denied entry to the EU.

Decisions regarding the migration crisis were formalized in the final documents of the European Council adopted on 18 February 7 March, and 18 March 2016, focusing on three main areas.

Firstly, the EU provided financial and technical support to countries receiving the highest migration flows, particularly Greece. This facilitated humanitarian assistance, administrative border control procedures, and processing of asylum requests according to EU rules. Reception centers were established where newly arrived migrants underwent initial screening and were divided into those whose asylum claims could be considered and those whose onward travel was restricted. Transit centers were also organized for applicants awaiting asylum or other forms of international protection.

Secondly, the EU concluded an agreement with Turkey defining the rights and obligations of both parties concerning migrants and refugees traveling through Turkey to Europe. Migrants who arrived illegally in Greece from Turkey would be returned to Turkey, and Europe would accept migrants only if their asylum claims were submitted and approved in Turkey. Turkish authorities were required to prevent smuggling and irregular migration to Europe. In exchange, the EU granted Syrian migrants the right to legal employment and education for children in Turkey, provided €3 billion in 2016–2017, accelerated visa liberalization for Turkish citizens, and resumed stalled negotiations on Turkey's accession to the EU.

Thirdly, in accordance with commitments to restore compliance with the Schengen rules and establish strict border controls, additional resources were allocated to specialized services, including the European Border and Coast Guard Agency (Frontex) and the European Union Agency for Asylum (EUAA), which manages the Common European Asylum System (CEAS) for applicants.

Additionally, on 22 September 2015, EU member states decided to allocate national quotas for refugees. This aimed to reduce migration pressure on countries such as Italy and Greece. Resettlement considered economic and demographic indicators such as GDP, population, unemployment rate, and the number of previously submitted asylum applications in each member state.

=== 2015–present ===
The provisions of the New Pact on Migration and Asylum apply to migrants apprehended while illegally crossing an external EU border, such as those reaching the shores of Greece, Italy, or Spain via the Mediterranean Sea or Atlantic Ocean on boats operated by smugglers, estimated at 300,000 individuals in 2023. These provisions do not apply to legal migrants entering the EU (approximately 3.5 million in 2023) or to migrants who arrived legally but overstayed their visas (approximately 700,000 in 2023).

According to Eurostat, EU countries granted protection status to 437,735 asylum seekers in 2024. In 2025, the number fell to 361,325. In 2025, Afghans were the largest group receiving protection status in the EU, with 98,175 people, or 27.2% of all positive decisions. They were followed by Venezuelans, Syrians, Ukrainians, Somalis, Malians, Turks, Haitians, and Eritreans. Among the ten largest citizenship groups by number of first-instance decisions, Venezuelans had the highest recognition rate in 2025 (92.1%), followed by Ukrainians and Afghans (73.3% each). According to the European Union Agency for Asylum, the recognition rate in the EU+ was around 30% in May 2026. Rates were particularly high for Malians (88%), Haitians (80%), Afghans (74%), and Sudanese (60%). The rate was 48% for Somalis, 46% for Chinese applicants, and 45% for Ukrainians.

On 10 February 2026 the European parliament voted for a new asylum policy and a EU-List of safe countries of origin.

In January 2026, India and the European Union signed a mobility and migration partnership agreement alongside a free trade agreement aimed at expanding and simplifying legal pathways to the EU for Indian students and skilled workers. According to Ursula von der Leyen, easing visa processes and establishing secure migration pathways through the pact are crucial for addressing long-term labour shortages in the European market.

== Asylum for those persecuted in the European Union ==
Rafał Gaweł from Poland, who had been sentenced to two years' imprisonment for alleged financial fraud, was granted political asylum in Norway on 30 September 2020. The asylum was granted on the grounds of concerns over the lack of a fair trial, insufficient control by Polish authorities over extreme-right militias, and the perception that the criminal case against him constituted political persecution by Polish authorities. The case has been widely interpreted in Poland as a response to the 2017 granting of refugee status in Poland to a Norwegian woman, Silje Garmo, who claimed persecution by the Norwegian Child Welfare Services.

== See also ==
- Immigration to Europe
- 2016 Hungarian migrant quota referendum
- 2023 Polish referendum
- Illegal immigration
- Immigration to Greece
- List of sovereign states and dependent territories by immigrant population
- European migrant crisis
- Free movement protocol
- Temporary Protection Directive
