= European Asylum Curriculum =

European Union project in the field of asylum

The European Asylum Curriculum (EAC) is a massive EU project in the field of asylum and is a tool to reach a more unified asylum procedure within Europe.

The EAC is an EU Member State initiative intending to enhance the capacity and quality of the European asylum process as well as to strengthen practical cooperation among the European asylum/immigration systems. With the motto "Knowledge and skills for protection in Europe," the cooperation between the Odysseus Academic Network and several EU member states' Immigration Services creates a European Asylum Curriculum, providing common vocational training for employees of the Immigration and Asylum Services in Europe.

== See also ==
- Asylum in the European Union
