= United Nations High Commissioner for Refugees Representation in Cyprus =

UNHCR Cyprus
- Location: Nicosia
- Address: Polyviou Dimitrakopoulou, Engomi, Nicosia, Cyprus
- Coordinates: 35.1632048°N 33.3459768°E
- Website: Official website

The United Nations High Commissioner for Refugees Representation in Cyprus is an office of the United Nations High Commissioner for Refugees (UNHCR) opened in August 1974 upon the request of the Government of Cyprus and the Secretary-General of the United Nations. UNHCR Representation in Cyprus was designated as Coordinator of the United Nations Humanitarian Assistance for Cyprus. UNHCR was also responsible upon the request of the Cyprus Government to examine applications for refugee status.

Simultaneously, UNHCR assisted the Government in developing their national legislation and procedure for the examination of asylum claims. The law came into life in 2000 and in January 2002 the Cyprus Government started receiving and processing asylum applications.

The UNHCR Representation in Cyprus offices are located in the United Nations Protected Area (UNPA), where the United Nations Peacekeeping Force in Cyprus (UNFICYP) is based. Access to UNPA is restricted and tightly controlled by UNFICYP, through check points and other forms of surveillance.

== History ==
=== 1974–1997 ===
UNHCR has been assisting in Cyprus since 1974. At the request of the Government of Cyprus (GoC) and the United Nations Secretary General (UN-SG), UNHCR operated programs for internally displaced persons (IDP) till 1998. This assistance included provision of housing and small industries as well as promotion of projects and bi-communal activities, in order to remedy the shortages created due to population displacements and to encourage co-operation between Greek Cypriots and Turkish Cypriots towards a unified approach as regards issues of common concern. This function lasted till 1997.

Since its establishment in 1974 and until June 1998, the UNHCR Representation in Cyprus office received a small number of applications for refugee status per year. In 1998, however, boats with persons claiming fear for their lives or serious violations of their human rights in their countries of origin started arriving in Cyprus asking for asylum.

=== 1998–2002 ===
Since 1998, UNHCR Cyprus has worked on its regular mandate (international refugees), as the designated authority charged with supervising the implementation of the 1951 Refugee Convention. The UN General Assembly (UN-GA) Resolution establishing UNHCR, as well as the 1951 Refugee Convention (that is binding on the Cyprus Republic), call for cooperation between the Governments and the UNHCR.

During that period, UNHCR Representation in Cyprus was heavily concentrated in supporting the efforts of the GoC to develop an asylum system and an asylum space in Cyprus. Since 1998 till 2002 UNHCR simultaneously undertook Refugee Status Determination (RSD), resettled the recognized refugees in other countries, assisted in the drafting of the national refugee legislation, assisted in the configuration of the required institutions for its implementation, and trained such institutions.

In 2002 the GoC started undertaking RSD on its own. The first Refugee Law enacted in Parliament in 2000 has been amended in 2002, 2004, 2005 and 2007 by transposing the EU directives aiming at harmonising the asylum space in the EU along common minimum standards. UNHCR has closely advised in the process of transposing each of these directives through direct guidance to the drafters (being the Asylum Service or the Attorney General office), as well as in the process of amending laws that should include sections on refugees.

=== Since 2002 ===
"Clean water and health care and school and food and tin roofs and cement floor, all of these things should constitute a set of basics that people must have as birthrights." -- Paul Farmer

UNHCR Cyprus undertakes RSD training each time new Eligibility Officers (EO) are recruited at the Asylum Service (thereafter AS) and Reviewing Authority (thereafter RA –an independent body). In addition, it trains cadets in the police academy twice a year as well as holding refreshment sessions for immigration police once a year. Advice on individual cases and on-the-job training are also part of the UNHCR training activities.

UNHCR contributed to the development of the European Refugee Fund (ERF -managed by the Ministry of Interior) annual and multi-annual strategy for Cyprus and participated in the selection committee for ERF project awards in 2005 and 2006. In 2006, it undertook the training of civil servants coming in contact with asylum seekers and refugees, and the training of teachers on asylum as a human right in the context of a project on European citizenship. UNHCR has closely advised the AS and the RA in particular towards sound policy and practice towards applicants from Iraq and Palestine in light of the particular current circumstances.

UNHCR assisted in the transposition of the EU directive on the minimum standards for the reception conditions (transposed in December 2005), the transposition of the EU qualifications directive (transposed in July 2006), and of the EU procedures directive. This process entailed the provision of a written commentary on the draft law, presenting views in the various sessions as called by the Parliament, providing written statements to the Parliament when these are necessary to complement the oral statements, conducting sessions with members of the committees as requested. Similar tasks have been performed in regards to other minor directives and amendments to national legislation related to asylum (such as the public allowance law and the legal aid law).

UNHCR also conducts surveys regarding the situation of persons of concern. In 2004, the office conducted several meetings with refugees residing in Cyprus and issued a report “The Situation of Refugees in Cyprus from a Refugee Perspective”. It also undertook a participatory assessment among refugees, persons granted subsidiary protection, and asylum seekers in November 2005. The participatory assessment was updated from June until September 2006 and focused specifically on female refugees and asylum seekers.

UNHCR Representation in Cyprus undertook the following surveys: in the first quarter of 2006 on the use of lawyers by asylum seekers, from September until December on the quality of public allowance among those a/s and refugees who succeed in receiving it, from February through June 2007 on the enjoyment of public allowance and other entitlements by Iraqi refugees and persons granted subsidiary protection and in 2008 on the training needs of refugees and persons granted subsidiary protection.

== Activities ==
=== World Refugee Day ===
To mark WRD, the Representation organized a cultural evening which was opened by the First Lady of the Republic of Cyprus and addressed by the President of the Palestinian community in Cyprus who shared her refugee experience. Young refugees from the Democratic Republic of Congo and Palestinians ex Iraq shared their experience through photos and music. Cypriot students displayed a short theatrical performance which addressed asylum, migration and xenophobia. The event encouraged the interaction of refugees with the local community and vice versa. Such events tend to enhance the process of integration and the feeling of belonging in the new community. For the local community this was an opportunity to see a different picture of refugees, one which is usually not portrayed by the majority of the media.

On this year's World Refugee Day, a special session of the Youth Parliament on the theme “Children Refugees – Children Immigrants – The Cypriot Reality” took place at the House of Representatives. The young parliamentarians presented their findings on issues affecting the children of asylum seekers, recognized refugees and immigrants residing in Cyprus. The special session was the result of a collaboration between the UNHCR and the local NGO Pancyprian Council for Children's Welfare. Preparations for the session commenced beginning of 2010. All proposals were also passed to the attendees of the special session.

=== Assisting refugees in integration mentoring programs ===
In addition, the UNHCR Representation in Cyprus has developed a number of mentoring programmes and integration processes:

- Coaching: In collaboration with several private companies, the Representation has initiated a voluntary coaching program that aims to familiarize refugees with Cypriot working culture through the improvement of their communication and presentation skills.
- Language programs: In collaboration with the School of Modern Greek at the University of Cyprus, the Representation secures placements for recognized refugees to receive intensive language courses through generous fee waiving.
- Information Centre: In an effort to facilitate the integration process of refugees, the Representation is also temporarily acting as an information centre, collecting and disseminating all possible information and announcements in relation to language, computer programs and other possibilities for vocational training in Nicosia and other areas.
- Employment Opportunities: In an attempt to enhance awareness and understanding of the employment rights of refugees, the Representation has collaborated with the Cyprus Chamber of Commerce and Industry and Cyprus Employers and Industrialists Federation, both of which have published an article in their monthly publication with regards to refugee employment rights.

== Plans ==
In the years to come, UNHCR Cyprus will continue its activities for enhancing the protection space for asylum seekers and refugees. An equal priority is to continue sharing information, policies and know-how with governmental and non-governmental actors with a view to improve their capacity to respond to the needs of asylum seekers and refugees.

UNHCR Cyprus would like to see more lawyers providing high quality counselling to asylum applicants, either through free legal counselling (as an in-kind contribution) by registered lawyers or through further development of NGO capacity. It will also pursue more projects to enhance the understanding of the refugee problem among the Cypriot society. Misinformation in the country of asylum will only exacerbate the suffering of refugees, who have already experienced enough pain after having lost their homes and loved ones as a result of who they are or what they believe. UNHCR representation in Cyprus has in addition a mandate to mobilize resources, both for the country field operations as well as for the UNHCR's operations around the world.

== Functions ==
=== Ensure adherence to international refugee law standards ===
UNHCR contributes technical and worldwide expertise to the Cypriot Government in the processing of individual examination of applications for asylum, with the aim to ensure that the decisions are in accordance with international human rights standards. For this same purpose, UNHCR partially funds NGOs to provide gender based assistance, as well as legal advice to carefully selected asylum applicants for their appeals and access to the rights granted in the national law.

=== Government advice ===
UNHCR advises governments by providing comments on related legislative drafts, such as on the transposition of EU directives for the harmonization of the European refugee system.

=== Training ===
UNHCR provides training to actors involved in the protection of refugees (police officers, officers who examine applications for refugee status, lawyers, civil servants responsible for the effective implementation of the related rights, etc.) and advocates for the improvement of the quality of the asylum system. UNHCR provides legal aid to well selected asylum applicants through a project undertaken by an NGO called Future Worlds Center.

Legal aid became available for asylum seekers and refugees in 2009, subsequent to an amendment of the Legal Aid Law. In particular, the Law now allows for the provision of legal aid in recourses to the Supreme Court against a negative decision by the Asylum Service (before the decision is challenged by the Reviewing Authority), or a negative decision by the Reviewing Authority. Legal aid will only be provided for recourses at a first instance at the Supreme Court, not for subsequent revisory appeals and there must be a possibility of a positive decision on the appeal, i.e. to prove that the applicant has a good case.

An asylum seeker interested in order to activate an entitlement to legal aid, he/she must submit an application to the District Court. The District Court shall grant the legal aid where two conditions are met: (a) a report by the Welfare Office states that the financial situation of the applicant (or the guardian of a dependent applicant) is such, that he/she is not able to pay their own legal fees and (b) that the case is deemed to be of such a seriousness that it calls for legal aid in the best interests of justice.

Although provisions for legal aid have been introduced for asylum seekers, the access to legal aid is highly restricted due to the lengthy and legally complex procedure of submitting and assessing the application, which includes proving the applicant has a good case. This renders access to legal aid almost impossible without the assistance of a legal advisor.

=== Supervision ===
As in all countries, UNHCR Cyprus has a supervisory role under the 1951 Refugee Convention in ensuring that the rights of asylum seekers and refugees are duly respected. That means in practice, having access to the asylum procedures, to adequate housing, food, medical treatment and to integration as a long term solution to the refugee plight.

=== Awareness ===
UNHCR informs and sensitizes the public on the problem of refugees around the world, and in Cyprus, by disseminating information to the media, and reviewing media reports on asylum seekers and refugees to ensure accuracy of facts. Public awareness can only have a positive impact on the public understanding.

In order to sensitize the general public in Cyprus towards the refugee cause and to prevent xenophobic attitudes and promote tolerance, UNHCR organises public awareness activities (e.g. photo or other exhibitions, concerts, etc.) In reaching young people, UNHCR promotes school activities and disseminates educational material to educators in co-operation with governmental and non-governmental partners.

== Refugee issues in Cyprus ==
Cyprus has been a destination for a consistently increasing number of regular and irregular immigrants. According to national sources, the estimated number of irregular migrants in Cyprus is 50,000. Cyprus enacted national refugee legislation in January 2000 and its asylum institutions started conducting Refugee Status Determination (RSD) in 2002. In 2007, 6,789 persons submitted asylum applications and in 2008, 3,922 persons applied for asylum. The number of the asylum-seekers pending to be examined at the end of 2009 was 5,275. Cyprus ranks first among EU countries in the per capita number of asylum applications.

Eight Year Overview of 1st instance Applications to the Republic of Cyprus
Month	2002	2003	2004	2005	2006	2007	2008	2009	2010
Jan	106	163	241	926	400	419	254	303	207
Feb	14	152	270	494	285	703	440	369	212
Mar	53	34	598	629	497	529	423	219	192
Apr	50	51	581	776	285	813	310	208	178
May	38	45	336	885	385	489	312	268	211
Jun	28	54	1,195	329	234	347	274	240	233
Jul	51	17	1,184	141	471	521	435	245	
Aug	63	111	675	792	285	500	220	175	
Sep	110	385	982	843	204	362	326	270	
Oct	112	393	543	606	394	696	232	315	
Nov	110	1,191	770	552	381	566	334	366	
Dec	216	1,815	2,484	772	724	839	362	247	
Total	951	4,411	9,859	7,745	4,545	6,784	3,922	3,225	1,233

In principle, asylum-seekers are not denied access to Cyprus. Most asylum-seekers, however, do not try to enter the country through official channels, in order to avoid the risk of not being admitted. While the Asylum Service (the first instance body that examines asylum applications and the coordinating body on asylum seekers’ issues) has made considerable progress in setting up the structures and the processes to ensure quality decisions, the reality remains that the number of Eligibility Officers (EOs) against the number of applicants is still objectively insufficient. This is clearly substantiated by the fact that at the end of 2008, there were 8,005 cases pending to be decided.

Other problems related to refugees issues in Cyprus are the following:

- Asylum lawyers are virtually non-existent and provision of free legal counselling by NGOs is insufficient
- The high number of asylum applicants has caused difficulties for the welfare services to provide for the minimum reception conditions as set out in the Reception Condition Regulations of 2005.
- Labour offices are to refer asylum seekers to jobs but the number of referrals is very low.
- Integration programs such as language and vocational training appear to be insufficiently disseminated among asylum seekers and refugees. Moreover, the practical difficulties faced by refugees are not sufficiently taken into account when it comes to the organization of such programs.
- There are no alternatives to administrative detention.
- There is only one reception center in the country with a capacity limited to 80 people.

Regarding the situation in the north part of Cyprus which the Government of Cyprus does not have de facto control, there are no socio-economic data available. Persons of certain nationalities are detained and deported as soon as possible, most of the time without being given an opportunity to distinguish irregular migrants from persons suffering persecution. The overwhelming majority of those individuals who succeed in entering into the north without being detected, cross the "Green Line" and apply to the Government of Cyprus. Applicants in the north are examined by UNHCR.

In 2023 some 11,617 persons applied for asylum in the RoC. In 2024, some 6,777 persons applied for asylum. Approximately 20,500 persons’ applications are pending at the Asylum Service and 6,900 persons’ appeals are pending at the International Protection Administrative Court (IPAC), as at end December 2024.

== See also ==
- United Nations High Commissioner for Refugees Representation in India
- United Nations Buffer Zone in Cyprus
- Cypriot refugees
- Green Line (Cyprus)
- Convention Relating to the Status of Refugees
- Cyprus dispute
