= ERF (gene) =

Protein-coding gene in the species Homo sapiens

Identifiers
- Aliases: ERF, CRS4, PE-2, PE2, ETS2 repressor factor, CHYTS
- External IDs: OMIM: 611888; MGI: 109637; GeneCards: ERF

Gene location (Human)
Chr.	Chromosome 19 (human)
Band	19q13.2	Start	42,247,569 bp
Band	19q13.2	End	42,255,128 bp

Gene location (Mouse)
Chr.	Chromosome 7 (mouse)
Band	7 A3|7 13.73 cM	Start	25,242,561 bp
Band	7 A3|7 13.73 cM	End	25,250,761 bp
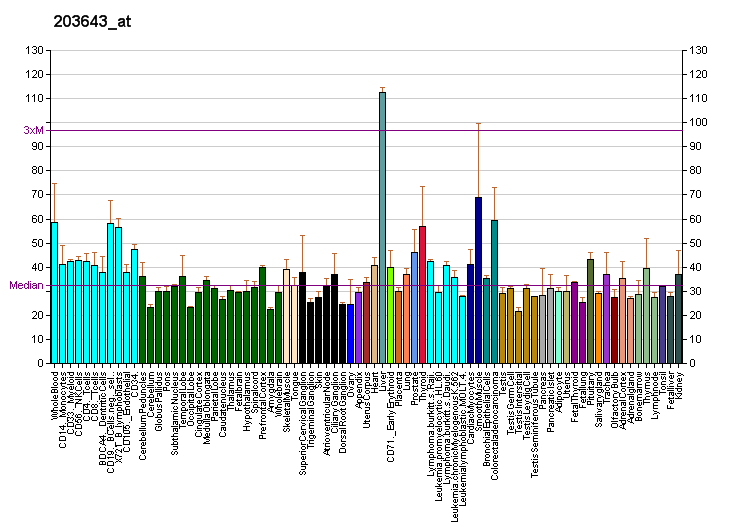
RNA expression pattern
Bgee	Human / Mouse (ortholog); Top expressed in: right uterine tube; gastric mucosa; gallbladder; left uterine tube; ventricular zone; olfactory zone of nasal mucosa; anterior pituitary; body of uterus; tibial nerve; right ovary / Top expressed in: genital tubercle; tail of embryo; yolk sac; ventricular zone; lip; superior frontal gyrus; primary visual cortex; dentate gyrus of hippocampal formation granule cell; epiblast; perirhinal cortex; More reference expression data
BioGPS	More reference expression data
Gene ontology
Molecular function	DNA-binding transcription factor activity; DNA binding; transcription corepressor activity; DNA-binding transcription repressor activity, RNA polymerase II-specific; sequence-specific DNA binding; DNA-binding transcription factor activity, RNA polymerase II-specific
Cellular component	nucleus; nucleoplasm; cytosol
Biological process	cell differentiation; regulation of transcription, DNA-templated; transcription, DNA-templated; negative regulation of transcription by RNA polymerase II; mitotic cell cycle; regulation of transcription by RNA polymerase II
Sources:Amigo / QuickGO
Orthologs
Databases	NCBI: entry; OMA: entry
Species	Human	Mouse
Entrez	2077	13875
Ensembl	ENSG00000105722	ENSMUSG00000040857
UniProt	P50548	P70459
RefSeq (mRNA)	NM_001301035; NM_001308402; NM_001312656; NM_006494	NM_010155
RefSeq (protein)	NP_001287964; NP_001295331; NP_001299585; NP_006485	NP_034285
Location (UCSC)	Chr 19: 42.25 – 42.26 Mb	Chr 7: 25.24 – 25.25 Mb
PubMed search
- Wikidata
View/Edit Human	View/Edit Mouse

ETS domain-containing transcription factor ERF is a protein that in humans is encoded by the ERF gene.
