= European Migration Network =

- Abbreviation: EMN
- Established: 14 May 2008; 18 years ago
- Legal status: EU funded network
- Purpose: Providing objective, reliable and up-to-date information on migration and asylum
- Website: European Migration Network (EMN) – European Commission

The European Migration Network (EMN) is an EU network of migration and asylum experts who work together to provide objective, comparable policy-relevant information and knowledge on emerging issues relating to migration and asylum in Europe.

The EMN was established in 2008 (Council Decision 2008/381/EC) and amended by Regulation (EU) No 516/2014 of the European Parliament and of the Council in April 2014. The Directorate-General for Migration and Home Affairs of the European Commission coordinates the EMN.

The EMN is funded by the European Commission through the Asylum Migration and Integration Fund (AMIF). The budget is allocated to support EMN NCPs in EU Member States who are co-financed from national funds. EMN NCPs located in EMN Observer Countries sponsor EMN activities from their own national budget.

== Network structure and organisation ==
=== EMN Steering Board ===
The EMN Steering Board provides strategic guidance on EMN activities. It is chaired by the European Commission and consists of representatives from EMN Member Countries. The European Commission is assisted in its coordinating role by the EMN Service Provider.

=== National level ===
The EMN consists of 35 National Contact Points (NCPs) from EMN Member Countries (EU Member States except Denmark) and Observer Countries (Norway, Georgia, the Republic of Moldova, Ukraine, Montenegro, Armenia, Serbia, the Republic of North Macedonia, Albania, and the United Kingdom), the European Commission (DG Migration and Home Affairs), and is supported by the EMN Service Provider (ICF).

EMN NCPs build and maintain networks of organisations and individuals involved in migration and asylum. These networks help gather information on national initiatives and contribute to the EMN by writing, reviewing reports, and/or providing expert inputs. EMN NCPs ensure ongoing communication with partners to foster continuous involvement.

=== EU level ===
The EMN collaborates among others with the Joint Research Centre (JRC) – European Commission, Eurostat and EU agencies such as the European Union Agency for Asylum, Frontex and the European Union Agency for Fundamental Rights as well as organisations such as the Council of Europe (CoE), the Organisation for Economic Co-operation and Development, the International Committee of the Red Cross and the Prague Process, creating opportunities for joint events, publications, and communication efforts.

== EMN outputs ==
The EMN produces reports, studies, informs and other publications which analyse migration and asylum policies and track legislative developments in this field. The topics of these publications are decided between EMN NCPs and the European Commission as part of an annual work programme based on EU priorities.

Asylum and Migration Overview: An annual report that highlights notable political and legislative developments from the previous year at EU level and across EMN Member and Observer Countries.

Country factsheets: Concise documents that provide key information about migration and asylum policies, practices, and statistics for each EMN Member and Observer Country each year. EMN country factsheets are published annually in the year following the coverage period.

Ad-hoc queries (AHQ): Ad-hoc queries collect information from EMN NCPs, at the request of any EMN Member or Observer Countries or the European Commission. The network produces compilations and summaries of the responses to ad hoc queries, which rapidly assess, the perspective of responding countries in relation to a wide range of migration and asylum-related issues such as legal migration, international protection, irregular migration, return and visas. The aim of ad hoc queries is to provide answers to EU and national policymakers within a few weeks.

Studies: Thematic publications which provide a comparative analysis of topics of immediate interest to policymakers and other stakeholders related to migration and asylum.

Studies on specific topics relevant to policymakers at national and EU levels.

Informs: Concise summaries to provide policymakers with key findings and messages on specific migration-related topics. These informs are based on information gathered and analysed from various sources, including EMN studies, and AHQ.

EMNews: A quarterly newsletter highlighting key migration and asylum developments at EU level and across EMN Member and Observer Countries.

EMN Asylum and Migration Glossary: The EMN Glossary, available on the EMN central website as well as a mobile application, enhances comparability by providing agreed definitions for asylum and migration terms. The Glossary includes over 540 terms in 27 languages.

The latest version of the Glossary is accessible on the EMN website and is also available for download as a mobile app for Android and iOS users.

== EMN events ==
EMN Presidency Conferences: These high-level conferences are organised by the EMN Member Countries holding the Presidency of the Council of the EU. Supported by the European Commission, they engage policymakers, academia, practitioners, and civil society.

Asylum and Migration Overview launch event: Each year the EMN holds a conference to launch its Asylum and Migration Overview and to address topical migration and asylum issues.

Capacity-building workshops: The focus is on supporting the implementation of the Pact on Migration and Asylum, with workshops addressing specific priorities, facilitating peer learning, and sharing good practices.

EU level events: The EMN, supported by the European Commission, hosts regular events, conferences, seminars, and workshops on migration and asylum. These may be co-organised with partners such as the OECD or the Prague Process to incorporate diverse perspectives. These events also include the annual launch of the Asylum and Migration Overview or other EMN publications.

National events: EMN NCPs organise annual national conferences and other events, addressing national migration priorities, promoting the EMN’s work, and strengthening engagement with national stakeholders and other target audiences. Although targeted at a national level, such activities may have a broader EU level focus.

== Destination Europe ==
The Destination Europe toolkit aims to educate and engage users on migration and integration issues in Europe. It helps users to better understand the complexities of migration and integration policies.
