= European Refugee Fund =

The European Refugee Fund (ERF) was a scheme designed to facilitate the sharing of the financial costs of the reception, integration and voluntary repatriation of refugees amongst European Union member states. All EU member states apart from Denmark participated in the ERF. The Fund financed both national and transnational projects, including providing skills and language training to refugees, improvements to reception facilities and refugee resettlement or relocation operations. The ERF was allocated €630 million in funding over the period 2008–13. It was set up in 2000, replacing previous ad hoc funding measures. In April 2014, the ERF, along with the European Integration Fund and the European Return Fund, was replaced by the Asylum Migration and Integration Fund (AMIF) established for the period 2014–20.

== See also ==
- Asylum Migration and Integration Fund
