= Refugee crisis =

Migration that is critical due to dimensions or conditions

Refugees in 2015
Total population
- 21.3 million (16.1 million under UNRWA's mandate; the total number of forcibly displaced persons is 70.3 million)

Regions with significant populations
- Africa: 4.456 million
- Europe: 4.391 million
- Asia and the Pacific: 3.831 million
- Middle East and North Africa: 2.739 million
- Americas: 746,800

A refugee crisis can refer to difficulties and/or dangerous situations in the reception of large groups of refugees. These could be forcibly displaced persons, internally displaced persons, asylum seekers or any other huge groups of migrants.

According to the United Nations High Commissioner for Refugees (UNHCR), due to conflicts, human rights violations, and other disturbing events, 108.4 million individuals experienced forced displacement globally by the end of 2022. 35.3 million of 108.4 were refugees. UNHCR oversees 29.4 million refugees, whereas 5.9 million fall under the mandate of UNRWA as Palestine refugees. Furthermore, internal displacement affects 62.5 million individuals, 5.4 million are asylum-seekers, and an additional 5.2 million are other people in need of international protection. More vital information from UNHCR highlights that 76% of refugees and those in need of international protection worldwide are hosted in low to middle-income countries, with a significant portion being countries neighboring their nations of origin. Türkiye hosted the largest refugee population globally, accommodating nearly 3.6 million refugees. The Islamic Republic of Iran followed closely with 3.4 million, trailed by Colombia with 2.5 million, Germany with 2.1 million, and Pakistan with 1.7 million. In relation to their national populations, Aruba (1 in 6) and Lebanon (1 in 7) hosted the highest number of refugees and individuals requiring international protection, followed by Curaçao (1 in 14), Jordan (1 in 16), and Montenegro (1 in 19). In 2022, the majority of refugees and individuals in need of international protection, accounting for 52%, originated from the top three countries that migrated to host nations. The first country was the Syrian Arab Republic with 6.5 million refugees, followed by Ukraine with 5.7 million, and Afghanistan, ranking third with 5.7 million refugees. In 2022, the government reported approximately 113,300 refugees who resettled, while UNHCR documented 116,500 refugees relocated to states for resettlement.

== Definition ==
According to the UN Refugee Agency, refugees are individuals who find themselves outside their home country due to a justified fear of persecution based on different factors such as race, religion, nationality, membership in a specific social group, or political opinion. They can be without a nationality, residing outside their home countries, and unable or unwilling to return there due to a fear of persecution. The UN Refugee Convention determines what conditions are required to be considered a refugee or when someone's refugee status is taken away due to circumstances changing in their country of origin.

== Causes ==
Causes for the refugee crises can include war, civil war, human rights violations, environment and climate issues, economic hardship, gender and sexual orientation-related factors, and hunger.

=== War and civil war ===
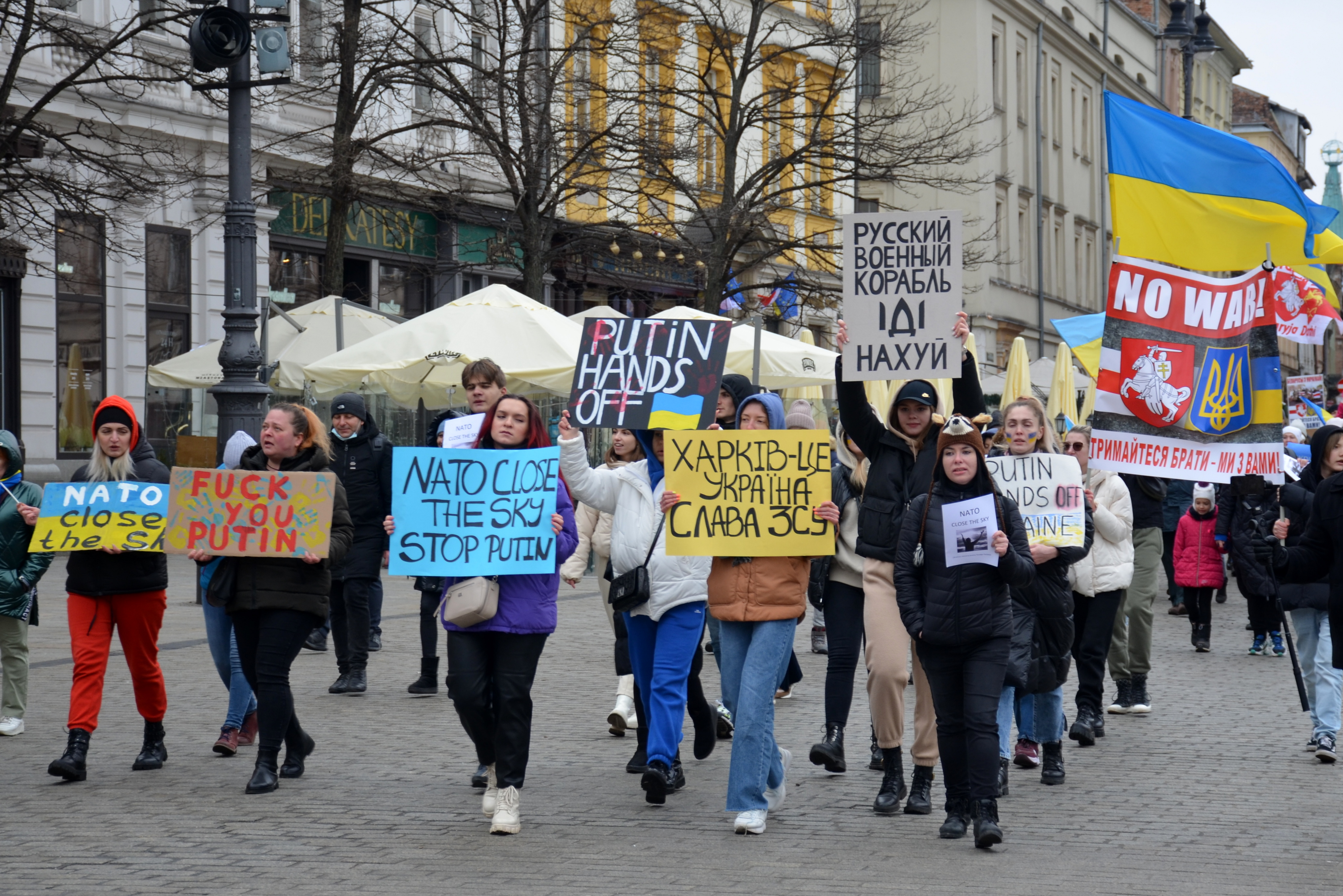
Ukrainian refugees in Kraków, Poland, protest against the Russian invasion of Ukraine, 6 March 2022

In June 2015 the UN refugee agency reported that wars and persecutions are the main reasons behind the refugee crises all over the world. A decade earlier, six people were forced to leave their homes every 60 seconds, but in 2015 wars drove 24 people on average away from their homes each minute. In its Border Wars series, the Transnational Institute examines the role of the arms industry in creating and profiting from forced displacement, underscoring that "some of the beneficiaries of border security contracts are some of the biggest arms sellers to the Middle-East and North-Africa, fueling the conflicts in the region that have led refugees to flee their homes. In other words, the companies contributing to the refugee crisis are now profiting from the consequences."

=== Human rights violations ===
Discrimination and inequality can also lead many individuals and families to move away from their homelands to other countries or regions (for example Australia, Europe, New Zealand, Nigeria and North America).

=== Environment and climate ===
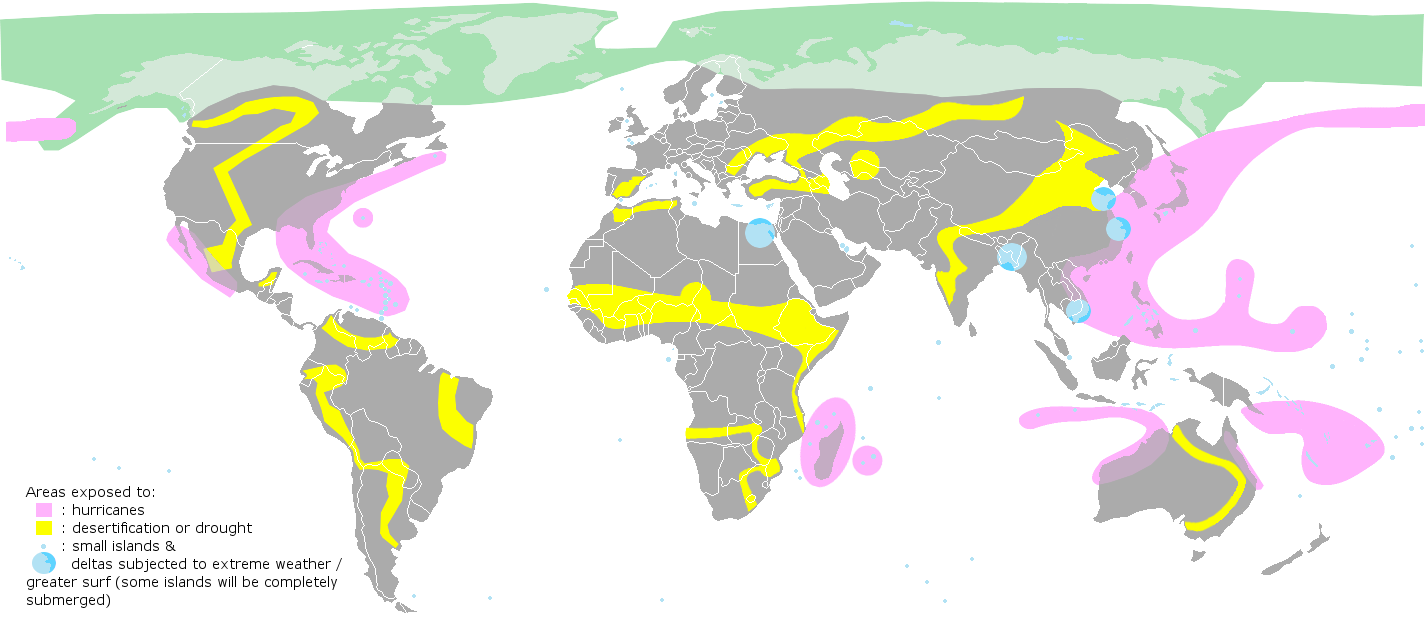
Map showing where natural disasters caused/aggravated by climate change can occur, and where possibly environmental refugees would be created

Although they do not fit the definition of refugees set out in the UN Convention, people displaced by the effects of climate change have often been termed "climate refugees" or "climate change refugees". The term 'environmental refugee' is also commonly used and an estimated 25 million people can currently be classified as such. The alarming predictions by the UN, charities and some environmentalists, that between 200 million and 1 billion people could flood across international borders to escape the impacts of climate change in the next 40 years are realistic. Case studies from Bolivia, Senegal and Tanzania, three countries that are said to be prone to suffering the effects of climate change, show that people affected by environmental degradation rarely move across borders. Instead, they adapt to new circumstances by moving short distances for short periods, often to cities. Millions of people live in places that are vulnerable to the effects of climate change. They face extreme weather conditions such as droughts or floods. Their lives and livelihoods might be threatened in new ways and create new vulnerabilities.

Following the effects of Hurricane Katrina in 2005, the term refugee was sometimes used to describe people displaced by the storm and the aftereffects. There was an outcry that the term should not be used to describe Americans displaced within their own county, and the term evacuee was substituted in its place. The UNHCR similarly opposes the use of the term refugee in reference to environmental migrants, as this term has a strict legal definition.

=== Economic hardship ===
Refugees often face, language barriers, trauma and mental health issues, and limited social networks. The labor market integration of refugees is more complex than that of economic migrants, as additionally they usually have experienced trauma in their country of origin or have undergone long periods of travel or stay in temporary settlements (e.g. refugee camps) along the way.

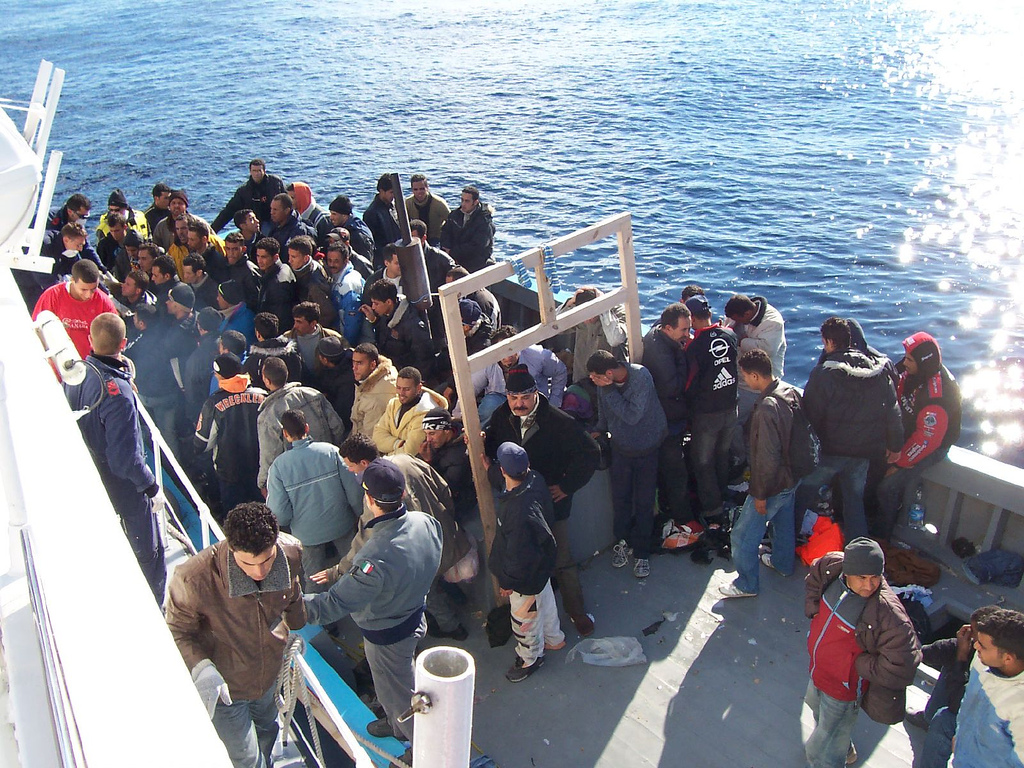
North African immigrants in Sicily, Italy

A forcibly displaced person is distinguished from an economic migrant. In 2008, the UN Office for the Coordination of Humanitarian Affairs suggested a better term for migrants who fled for the purpose of their and their dependents' basic survival was "forced humanitarian migrants". These economic migrants fall outside the mandates of the support structures offered by governments and non-governmental organizations for refugees.

Even economic migration requires a certain level of 'wealth' as migration is always a selective process - and the poorest and most vulnerable people are often excluded as they will find it almost impossible to move due to a lack of necessary funds or social support.

An example is the 2008-2009 mass movement of Zimbabweans to neighboring countries. Most migrants did not fit in either category and had more general needs that fell outside the specific mandate of the UNHCR.

== Gender based violence ==
Women and children refugees face a disproportionate threat of violence throughout their migratory journeys and within refugee camps. Violence targeting women who travel alone and women who travel with children is an example of Gender-Based Violence. The most common forms of Gender-Based Violence include rape and other forms of sexual assault, human trafficking, and forced sex, often in exchange for passage to Europe via human smugglers.

Moria Refugee Camp is Europe's largest refugee camp and is located on Lesvos Island, Greece. Moria Refugee Camp was originally designed for 3,500 people, however it currently holds more than 20,000 people. Moria Refugee Camp is considered by many in the international community as an unsafe environment for women and children. On 29 September 2019 a deadly fire broke out in Moria Refugee Camp killing at least one person. Following the fire, inhabitants of the camp began protesting the inhumane conditions of Moria Refugee Camp and a riot broke out leaving one woman and child dead. Multiple Non-Government Organizations continue to work within Moria Refugee Camp in response to the dangerous conditions that disproportionately affect women and children with the goal of reducing gender-based violence from the refugee camp.

== Exploits of displaced people ==
Large groups of displaced persons could be abused as 'weapons' to threaten either political enemies or neighbouring countries. Refugees as Weapons is mass exodus of refugees from a state to a hostile state as a "weapon" against an enemy. Weaponized migration occurs when a challenging state or non-state actor exploits human migration—whether voluntary or forced—in order to achieve political, military, and/or economic objectives. The concept is categorized into infiltration, coercive, dispossessive, exportive, fifth Column.

== Political responses ==
Since the establishment of the United Nations High Commission for Refugees, instances of population displacement have been identified by registered non-governmental organizations (NGOs) in countries where local governments fail to provide or protect the economic means and social rights of their citizens. In 1963, Prince Sadruddin Aga Khan, then Deputy High Commissioner, stated – after visiting Africa – that some refugees are "a by product" and will probably "not have much of a chance to return to their country".

The Aga Khan Development Network, led by the current Ismaili imam, the Aga Khan IV, is engaged in "enhanced cooperation" with the United Nations High Commissioner for Refugees to "help broaden the way the international community responds to crises today".

Following the US-led intervention in Afghanistan in 2001, NATO joined forces to address the volatile situation. By the end of 2014, as NATO forces withdrew, Afghanistan faced political challenges despite having conducted elections and establishing an elected president. Recognizing the persistent weakness in the political infrastructure, the United Nations responded by establishing the United Nations Assistance Mission in Afghanistan. UNAMA collaborated with the Office of the High Commissioner for Human Rights and various Afghan organizations. The focus was on monitoring the situation of the civilian population, taking into account efforts to promote protection and assist in full implementation of fundamental freedoms and human rights provisions of the Afghan Constitution and international treaties to which Afghanistan is a State Party.

=== Preventing the root causes of migration ===
The flow of migrants can be reduced by removing the causes of migration like wars, for example. The United Nations urge to make more efforts for achieving this type of solutions.

The European Union has many tools for addressing the root causes of the crisis: "such as the trust funds for Africa and for the Syrian refugee crisis, the Facility for Refugees in Turkey and the EU's External Investment Plan" However, as the Transnational Institute criticised in a 2021 report, "Europe is creating refugees through its arms trade. If the EU and its member states genuinely want to address what they perceive as a "migration crisis", they must curb arms exports, improve accountability mechanisms, and end the unbridled lobbying efforts of arms companies in the corridors of power in Brussels and other European capitals."

Germany is trying to prevent the root causes of the migrant crisis in Africa. It created a "Marshall Plan with Africa" (Eckpunkte für einen Marshallplan mit Afrika). The main objectives of the plan are: "increasing trade and development on the continent and hopefully reducing mass migration flows north across the Mediterranean". It will concentrate on " fair trade, increased private investment, bottom-up economic development, entrepreneurship, and job creation and employment". The European Union offered an aid package to Mali in return for taking back her refugees. Among other ways, it is trying to reduce the migrant flow from Ghana by helping the population to find employment in this country.

Another example of addressing the root causes of the crisis is The Mesopotamian Ecology Movement (MEM) attempts to conserve the water resources of the region by different methods, including "returning to traditional water-conserving cultivation techniques", as well as "communal economy". Political stability and peace in the region are important to achieve the target Kurdistan is an area relatively rich in water, especially for the Middle East region. Large part of the water of Iraq, Iran, Syria, Turkey come from it. It means that water resource conservation in it, is important to the water supply of the region, what can help prevent wars and reach stability. Kurdistan has hosted 2,250,000 refugees fleeing conflict zones elsewhere in Iraq and Syria, by 2015. This can help prevent refugee waves to Europe and United States.

=== Refugee integration policies ===
A large part of refugee policy pertains to refugee and asylum seeker integration. Integration refers to a “mutual, gradual and multi-faceted process, with inter-related legal, socio-economic and cultural dimensions”.

To guide and track refugee and asylum policy the UNHCR uses the Dataset of World Refugee and Asylum Policies (DWRAP). The DWRAP index codes the national displacement policies of 193 countries across 54 provisions. The DWRAP breaks up each refugee and asylum policy into 5 domains: access, services, livelihoods, movement, and participation, with each domain containing its own sub-categories. Access refers to the ease of entrance and security of status, services includes education and health and welfare, livelihoods references labor market mobility and property rights, movement encapsulates encampment policies, and participation refers to citizenship and political rights.

Some of the global trends indicated in the DWRAP are as follows:

Under the access domain, refugee policies have become more inclusive and liberal globally. However, Asia has generally remained stagnant in their policies over the last 20 years. Europe provides more services and protections under the services domain than any other region in the world. Globally there are few rights for refugees and asylum seekers under the livelihoods and participation domains.

Anti-discrimation policies have seen consistent progress within the EU since the 2000 EU Racial Equality Directive. Spain, Romania, Slovenia, and Croatia have strengthened their policies the most, especially within the last five years.

==== Challenges with refugee integration ====
The large-scale arrival of refugees between 2015 and 2016 in Europe highlighted a lot of the limitations and challenges with refugee integration that countries and municipalities face. The most integration happens on the local level and tends to be provided by municipal authorities. As a result, some municipalities cannot meet the demands needed for a comprehensive integration process.

Funding

Many funding sources are project-based and integration is a lengthy process requiring predictable, stable funding. Many times the budgets for municipalities are incompatible with the number of people they are hosting, or they have to prioritize already existing issues and cannot allocate enough of their budget to refugee services.

Housing

Many refugees face access barriers within the private housing market due to high costs, discrimination, or documentation issues, and many regions face a public housing stock shortage due to privatization. There is also strict eligibility criteria for social housing resources, and many refugees are competing with the general population for such housing.

Refugees continue to settle in metropolitan, urban centers as they are more likely to house large diaspora communities who can support integration within their communities. However, refugee inclusion actually remains more rapidly achievable in less dense cities where local municipalities are more intertwined with close-knit communities.

While many challenges still remain today, there has been effort in recent years to reform integration policies especially in the European Union.

==== Impact of Ukraine on EU Integration Policy ====
After February 2022, when Russia launched a military invasion in Ukraine the number of Ukrainians entering the EU grew rapidly. The displacement of Ukrainians in the EU was one of the largest influxes of asylum seekers the European Union had seen in years, after the migration of Syrians in 2015. Up until this point, the EU's asylum system was not considered highly regarded, and there were concerns that the EU could become overburdened with this new influx of refugees. Instead, the EU took this opportunity to largely reform their Common European Asylum System (CEAS) and put into place policy agendas that would increase cooperation and efficiency among their integration systems. The EU adopted the Temporary Protect Directive (TPD). This legislation expedited access to rights and services for refugees and removed many administrative hurdles that could sometimes take up to years. It was adopted unanimously by the council and it outlined specific rights to residence permits, social welfare and medical care access, education, and access to employment. On 28 March, that same year, the EU published a ten-point action plan to strengthen integration efforts throughout the EU and enhance coordination efforts to receive displaced people.

The arrival of Ukrainian Refugees has also helped improve healthcare and education policies for migrants, specifically in Eastern Europe. In the healthcare sector, countries have improved translation of health information, broadened research on migrant health, and expanded the involvement of immigrants in the planning of health services. Countries that have made the most noteworthy amount of progress include Estonia, Romania, and Poland.

== Forecasting refugee trends ==
Various methods have been proposed and implemented to forecast refugee trends to and from various countries, including aspect structuring and the Bayesian semiparametric approach. Forecasting refugee trends is useful for national and international immigration policies, relief efforts, and economic projections including unemployment rates.

== Migratory routes and methods of fleeing ==
Global migrant deaths and missing persons by route (2014–2024), provided by the IOM's Missing Migrants Project

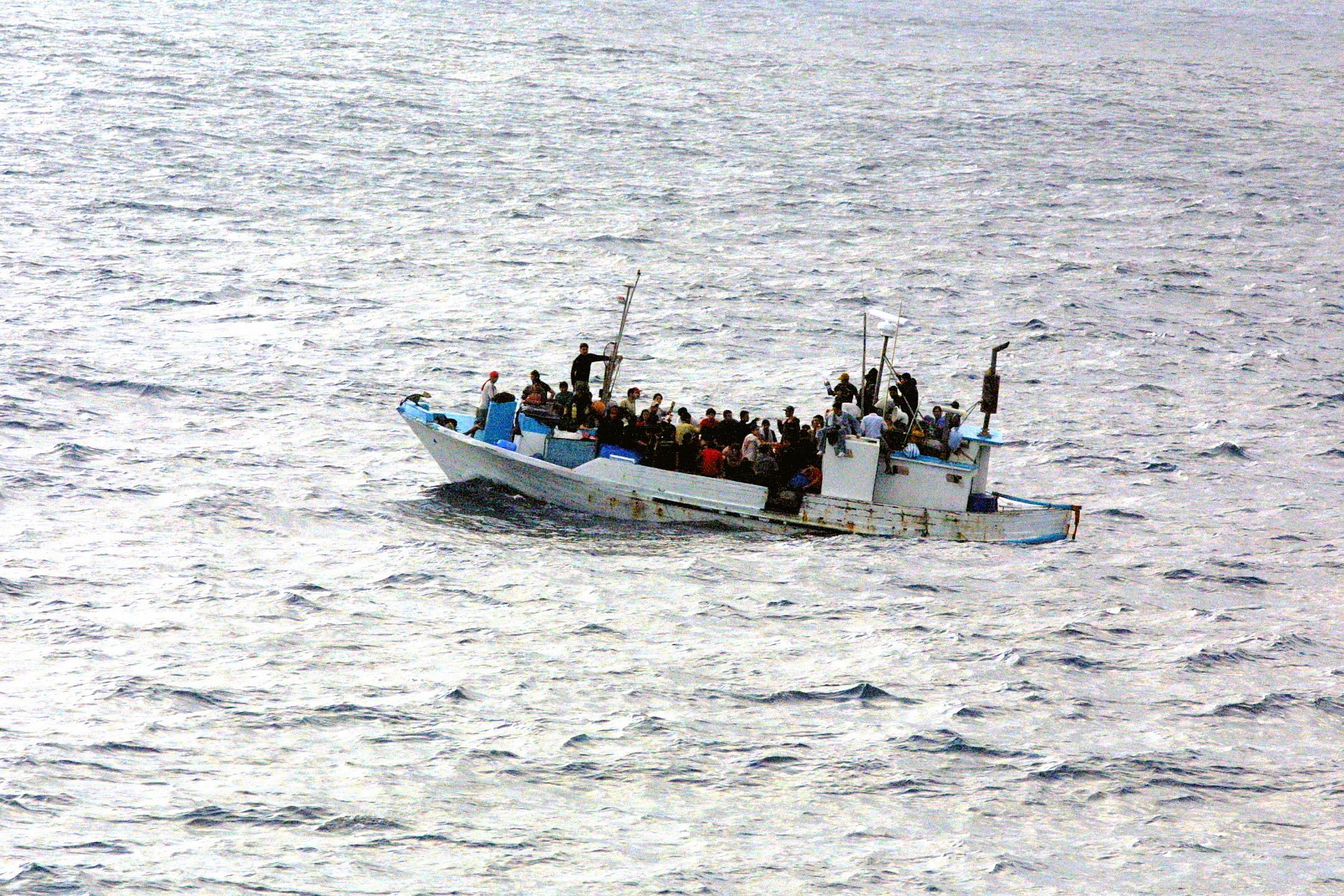
Ecuadorian refugees near Guatemala

The term boat people came into common use in the 1970s with the mass exodus of Vietnamese refugees following the Vietnam War. It is a widely used form of migration for people migrating from Cuba, Haiti, Morocco, Vietnam or Albania. They often risk their lives on dangerously crude and overcrowded boats to escape oppression or poverty in their home nations. Events resulting from the Vietnam War led many people in Cambodia, Laos, and especially Vietnam to become refugees in the late 1970s and 1980s. In 2001, 353 asylum seekers sailing from Indonesia to Australia drowned when their vessel sank.

5 Cuban refugees attempted (unsuccessfully, but un-harmed) to reach Florida in a 1950s pickup truck made buoyant by oil barrels strapped to its sides.

Boat people are frequently a source of controversy in the nation they seek to immigrate to, such as the United States, New Zealand, Germany, France, Russia, Canada, Italy, Japan, South Korea, Spain and Australia. Boat people are often forcibly prevented from landing at their destination, such as under Australia's Pacific Solution (which operated from 2001 until 2008), or they are subjected to mandatory detention after their arrival.

There are three Mediterranean refugee routes: Eastern, Central and Western route. Since 2015 more than 700.000 refugees and other migrants used these routes (i.e. the Eastern Balkan route and the Western Balkan route) from Greece through the Balkan to enter central European countries. Since March 2016 the Eastern route is almost closed, but the Western route is still busy.

== Modern and contemporary refugee crises ==
=== Global population of concern ===
As of 2018, 70.8 million individuals have been forcibly displaced worldwide because of persecution, conflict, violence, or human rights violations, per the UN High Commissioner for Refugees (UNHCR). Of these, 5.5 million were Palestinian refugees, which are not under UNHCR but under UNRWA's mandate.

Since 2007, the refugee estimates include not only refugees per the narrow 1951 UN definition, but also people in refugee-like situations, so figures prior to 2007 are not fully comparable. The figure also includes internally displaced persons (IDP) within their country and people in IDP-like situations, which is descriptive and includes groups of persons who are inside their country of nationality or habitual residence and who face protection risks similar to those of IDPs but who, for practical or other reasons, could not be reported as such and stateless persons.

Refugees, total population of concern, by territory of asylum, by UN region, 2008–2018
Region (UN major area)	2018	2017	2016	2015	2014	2013	2012	2011	2010	2009	2008
Africa	27,215,648	25,064,621	21,288,728	20,277,162	17,755,821	13,552,429	12,546,381	13,054,069	10,176,423	2,106,300	10,176,423
Asia	28,503,516	30,016,253	31,168,078	29,703,611	25,940,393	20,071,389	15,448,253	14,525,986	6,112,716	18,567,061	16,112,716
Europe	6,091,713	6,331,983	6,210,994	5,482,946	3,901,936	2,655,496	2,956,456	3,022,529	2,992,734	3,069,748	2,992,734
Latin America & Caribbean	11,620,790	8,826,832	8,061,269	7,659,143	6,669,992	5,995,468	4,351,990	4,315,819	4,117,369	3,740,389	4,117,369
Northern America	1,228,940	1,090,292	936,875	714,900	620,922	530,502	477,388	483,219	487,433	569,868	487,433
Oceania	131,332	109,525	83,894	69,894	69,780	60,113	52,868	40,243	37,801	38,148	37,801
Total	74,791,939	71,439,506	67,749,838	63,907,656	54,958,844	42,865,397	35,833,362	35,441,865	33,924,476	36,460,806	33,924,476

=== Africa ===
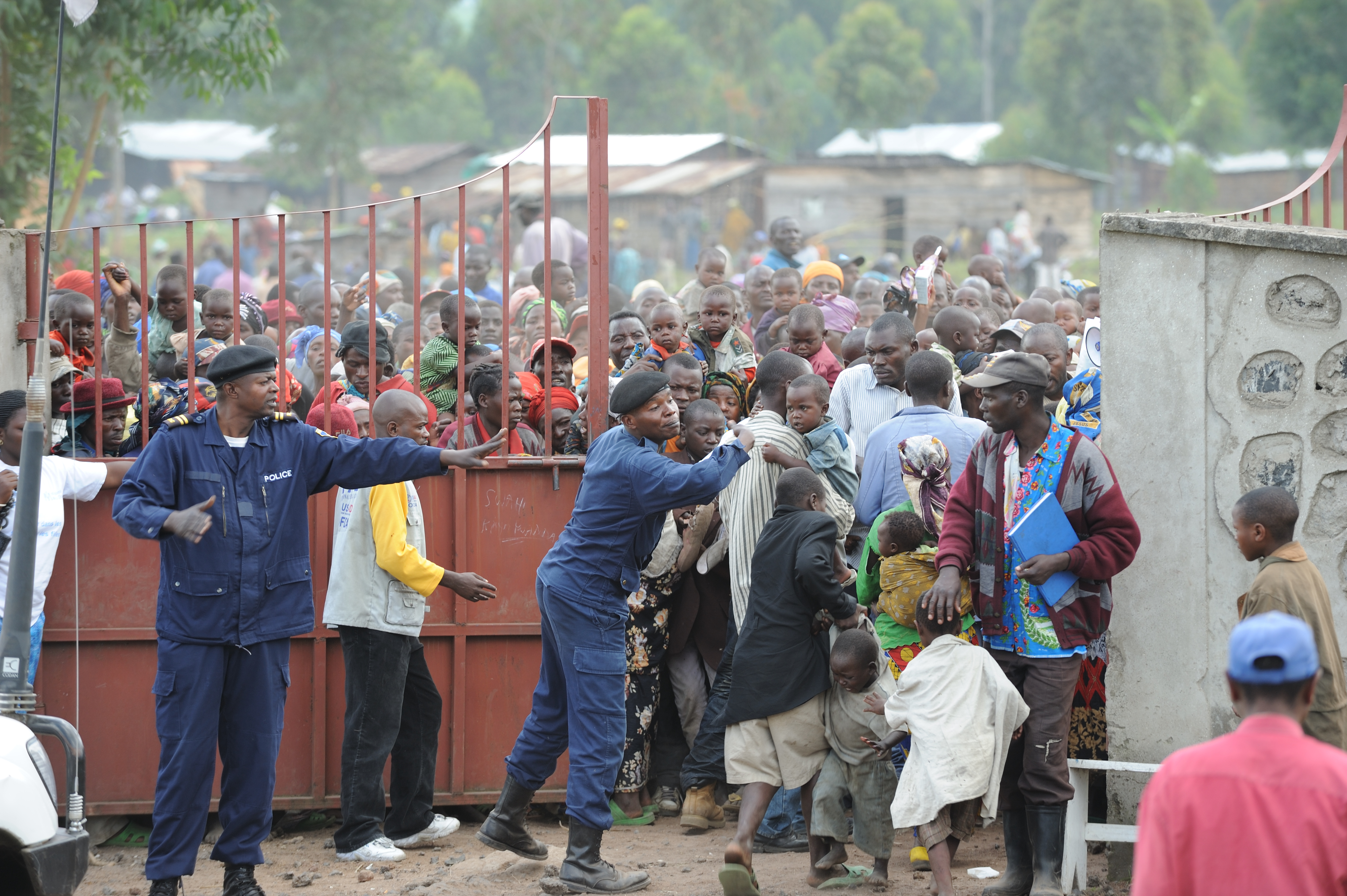
Distribution of humanitarian aid at a refugee camp in Congo

Since the 1950s, many nations in Africa have suffered civil wars and ethnic strife, thus generating a massive number of refugees of many different nationalities and ethnic groups. The number of refugees in Africa increased from 860,000 in 1968 to 6,775,000 by 1992. By the end of 2004, that number had dropped to 2,748,400 refugees, according to the United Nations High Commission for Refugees. (That figure does not include internally displaced persons, who do not cross international borders and so do not fit the official definition of refugee.)

Many refugees in Africa cross into neighboring countries to find haven; often, African countries are simultaneously countries of origin for refugees and countries of asylum for other refugees. The Democratic Republic of Congo, for instance, was the country of origin for 462,203 refugees at the end of 2004, but a country of asylum for 199,323 other refugees. The largest number of refugees in 2004 are from Sudan and have fled either the longstanding and recently concluded Sudanese Civil War or the War in Darfur and are located mainly in Chad, Uganda, Ethiopia, and Kenya.

=== Northern Africa ===
==== Algeria ====
The International Organization for Migration has stated that refugee migration into Algeria has markedly increased since 2014, with most refugees arriving from Niger. According to the Associated Press over 14,000 refugees were expelled from Algeria between August 2017 and June 2018, with refugees forced to walk on foot through the Sahara to small towns in Niger. The AP reported that as many as 30,000 refugees had died in the desert in Algeria, Niger and nearby countries since 2014.

==== Libya ====
Refugees of the 2011 Libyan civil war are the people, predominantly of Libyan nationality, who fled or were expelled from their homes during the 2011 Libyan civil war, from within the borders of Libya to the neighbouring states of Tunisia, Egypt and Chad, as well as to European countries, across the Mediterranean, as Boat people. The majority of Libyan refugees are Arabs and Berbers, though many of other ethnicities, temporarily living in Libya, originated from sub-Saharan Africa, were also among the first refugee waves to exit the country. The total Libyan refugee numbers are estimated at near one million as of June 2011. About half of them had returned to Libyan territory during summer 2011, though large refugee camps on Tunisian and Chad border kept being overpopulated.

==== Western Sahara ====
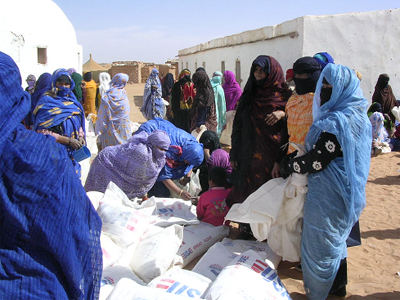
Saharawi refugee women with flour in Dakhla, southwestern Algeria (2004)

It is estimated that between 165,000 – 200,000 Sahrawis – people from the disputed territory of Western Sahara – have lived in five large refugee camps near Tindouf in the Algerian part of the Sahara Desert since 1975. The UNHCR and WFP are presently engaged in supporting what they describe as the "90,000 most vulnerable" refugees, giving no estimate for total refugee numbers.

=== Central Africa ===
==== Angola ====
Decolonization during the 1960s and 1970s often resulted in the mass exodus of European-descended settlers out of Africa – especially from North Africa (1.6 million European pieds noirs), Congo, Mozambique and Angola. By the mid-1970s, the Portugal's African territories were lost, and nearly one million Portuguese or persons of Portuguese descent left those territories (mostly Portuguese Angola and Mozambique) as destitute refugees – the retornados.

The Angolan Civil War (1975–2002), one of the largest and deadliest Cold War conflicts, erupted shortly after and spread out across the newly independent country. At least one million people were killed, four million were displaced internally and another half million fled as refugees.

==== Great Lakes ====
In the aftermath of the 1994 Rwandan genocide, over two million people fled into neighboring countries, in particular Zaire. The refugee camps were soon controlled by the former government and Hutu militants who used the camps as bases to launch attacks against the new government in Rwanda. Little action was taken to resolve the situation and the crisis did not end until Rwanda-supported rebels forced the refugees back across the border at the beginning of the First Congo War.

==== Sudan ====
There are tens of thousands of Sudanese refugees in Egypt, most of them seeking refuge from ongoing military conflicts in their home country of Sudan. Their official status as refugees is highly disputed, and they have been subject to racial discrimination and police violence. They live among a much larger population of Sudanese migrants in Egypt, more than two million people of Sudanese nationality (by most estimates; a full range is 750,000 to 4 million (FMRS 2006:5) who live in Egypt). The U.S. Committee for Refugees and Immigrants believes many more of these migrants are in fact refugees, but see little benefit in seeking recognition.

===== Darfur =====
An estimated 2.5 million people, roughly one-third the population of the Darfur area, have been forced to flee their homes after attacks by Janjaweed Arab militia backed by Sudanese troops during the war in Darfur in western Sudan.

=== Western Africa ===
==== Nigeria ====
Following Boko Haram's violence thousands of Nigerians fled to Niger and Cameroon

=== Eastern Africa ===
==== Somalia ====
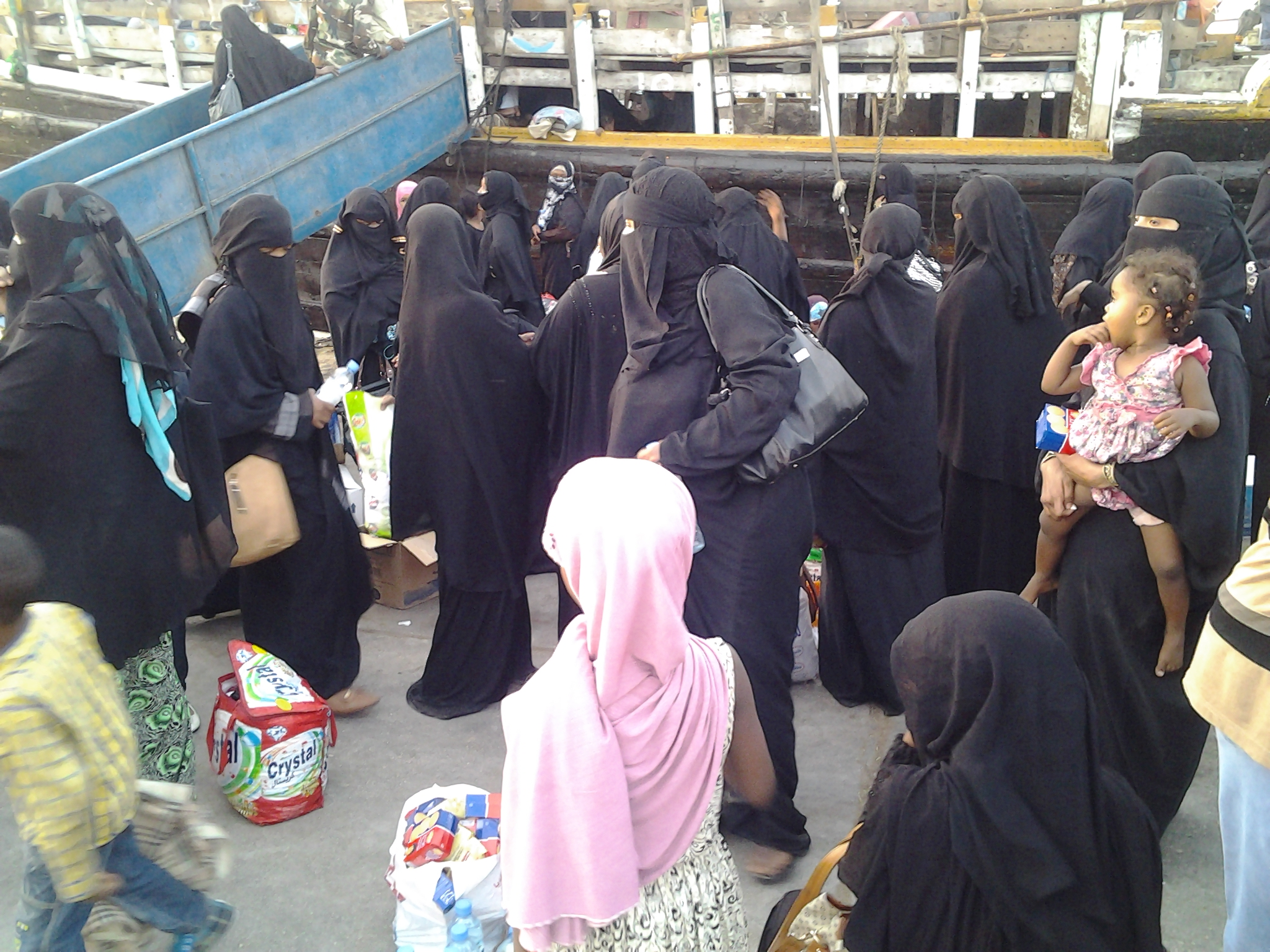
Returning Somali expatriates in Bosaso, Somalia (2015)

Following the outbreak of civil war in Somalia, many of the country's residents left in search of asylum. According to the UNHCR, there were around 976,500 registered refugees from the nation in adjacent states as of 2016. The majority of these individuals were registered in Kenya (413,170: 326,611 in Dadaab, 54,550 in Kakuma, 32,009 in Nairobi), Yemen (253,876 in UNHCR centers and urban areas), and Ethiopia (213,775 in five camps in Dollo Ado). Additionally, 1.1 million people were internally displaced persons (IDPs). Most of the IDPs were Bantus and other ethnic minorities originating from the southern regions, including those displaced in the north. An estimated 60% of the IDPs were children. Causes of the displacement included armed violence, diverted aid flows and natural disasters, which hindered the IDPs' access to safe shelter and resources. IDP settlements were concentrated in south-central Somalia (893,000), followed by the northern Puntland (129,000) and Somaliland (84,000) regions. Additionally, there were around 9,356 registered refugees and 11,157 registered asylum seekers in Somalia. Most of these foreign nationals emigrated from Yemen to northern Somalia after the Houthi insurgency in 2015.

==== Uganda ====
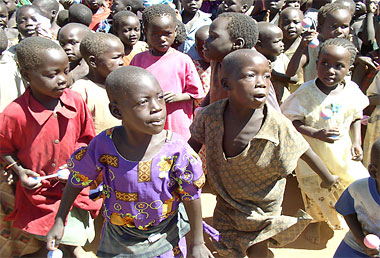
Ugandan refugee children at a camp near Kitgum

In the 1970s Uganda and other East African nations implemented racist policies that targeted the Asian population of the region. Uganda under Idi Amin's leadership was particularly most virulent in its anti-Asian policies, eventually resulting in the expulsion and ethnic cleansing of Uganda's Asian minority. Uganda's 80,000 Asians were mostly Indians born in the country. India had refused to accept them. Most of the expelled Indians eventually settled in the United Kingdom, Canada and in the United States.

The Lord's Resistance Army insurgency forced many civilians to live in internally displaced person camps.

=== North America ===
==== United States ====
The United States Refugee Admissions Program (USRAP) provides new opportunities for refugees, to help them integrate into society, give hope to refugees living in difficult circumstances abroad, and save lives. Statistically, refugees report that the program has enabled them to support themselves soon after arrival (92%), helped them integrate (77%), and had a positive economic impact on the local community (71%). (Kerwin, 2021)

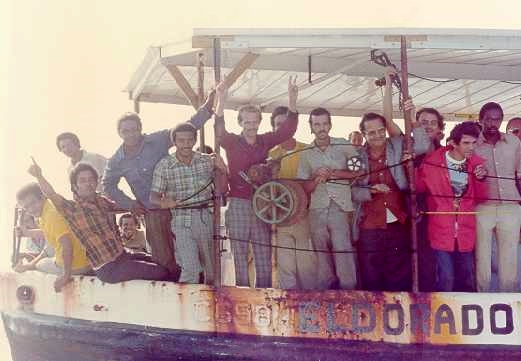
A boat crowded with Cuban refugees arrives in Key West, Florida, during the 1980 Mariel Boatlift.

During the Vietnam War, many U.S. citizens who were conscientious objectors and wished to avoid the draft sought political asylum in Canada. President Jimmy Carter issued an amnesty. Since 1975, the U.S. has resettled approximately 2.6 million refugees, with nearly 77% being either Indochinese or citizens of the former Soviet Union. Since the enactment of the Refugee Act of 1980, annual admissions figures have ranged from a high of 207,116 in 1980 to a low of 27,100 in 2002.

Currently, nine national voluntary agencies resettle refugees nationwide on behalf of the U.S. government: Church World Service, Ethiopian Community Development Council, Episcopal Migration Ministries, Hebrew Immigrant Aid Society, International Rescue Committee, U.S. Committee for Refugees and Immigrants, Lutheran Immigration and Refugee Service, United States Conference of Catholic Bishops, and World Relief.

Jesuit Refugee Service/USA (JRS/USA) has worked to help resettle Bhutanese refugees in the United States. The mission of JRS/USA is to accompany, serve and defend the rights of refugees and other forcibly displaced persons. JRS/USA is one of 10 geographic regions of Jesuit Refugee Service, an international Catholic organization sponsored by the Society of Jesus. In coordination with JRS's International Office in Rome, JRS/USA provides advocacy, financial and human resources for JRS regions throughout the world.

The U.S. Office of Refugee Resettlement (ORR) funds a number of organizations that provide technical assistance to voluntary agencies and local refugee resettlement organizations. RefugeeWorks, headquartered in Baltimore, Maryland, is ORR's training and technical assistance arm for employment and self-sufficiency activities, for example. This nonprofit organization assists refugee service providers in their efforts to help refugees achieve self-sufficiency. RefugeeWorks publishes white papers, newsletters and reports on refugee employment topics.

The US government position on refugees states that there is repression of religious minorities in the Middle East and in Pakistan such as Christians, Hindus, as well as Ahmadi, and Zikri denominations of Islam. In Sudan, where Islam is the state religion, Muslims dominate the government and restrict activities of Christians, practitioners of traditional African indigenous religions and other non-Muslims. The question of Jewish, Christian and other refugees from Arab and Muslim countries was introduced in March 2007 in the US Congress.

In 2016, the Obama administration announced a commitment to increase the number of refugees admitted to the U.S. to 110,000 in 2017, from the rate of 85,000 in the 2016 fiscal year, in addition to a private sector call to action in the Partnership for Refugees.

In 2022, after Russia's full-scale invasion of Ukraine, and a wave of Ukrainians entered the US via Mexico, the US government created the Uniting for Ukraine (U4U) program. This program provides a 2-year parole period for Ukrainians if a US sponsor agrees to financially support them. Ukrainians on U4U are not classified as refugees under US law, and most do not meet the US legal requirements for asylum, meaning most have no legal pathway to stay in the US long-term. There is no cap to the number of people who can come to the US on U4U; over 170,000 had come as of December 2023.

In late 2022 and early 2023, the US government created another parole program, this time for Cubans, Haitians, Nicaraguans, and Venezuelans. This program is similar to Uniting for Ukraine except that the number of beneficiaries is capped at 30,000 per month, causing yearslong wait times.

=== Central America ===
==== Costa Rica ====
In 1982 there were substantial refugees in Costa Rica from Nicaragua, Guatemala, Cuba, Haiti, El Salvador and other South American countries, either staying in Costa Rica or waiting for acceptance into another country.

==== El Salvador ====
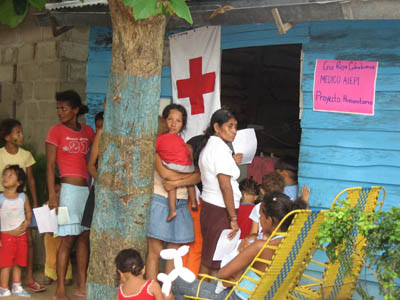
Colombian refugees receiving humanitarian assistance

More than one million Salvadorans were displaced during the Salvadoran Civil War from 1975 to 1982. About half went to the United States, most settling in the Los Angeles area.

==== Guatemala ====
There was a large exodus of Guatemalans during the 1980s, trying to escape from the civil war there. Conflict between the Guatemalan military and guerilla forces contributed to high death tolls and is considered to be the leading cause of death in the early 1980s. In 1984 there were on average 46,000 Guatemalan refugees in Mexico, vastly exceeding its surroundings Central American neighbors, who were only taking in small amounts of Guatemalan refugees.

=== The Caribbean ===
==== Cuba ====
The victory of the forces led by Fidel Castro in the Cuban Revolution led to a large exodus of Cubans between 1959 and 1980. Thousands of Cubans yearly continue to risk the waters of the Straits of Florida seeking better economic and political conditions in the U.S. In 1999 the highly publicized case of six-year-old Elián González brought the covert migration to international attention. Measures by both governments have attempted to address the issue. The U.S. government instituted a wet feet, dry feet policy allowing refuge to those travelers who manage to complete their journey, and the Cuban government has periodically allowed for mass migration by organizing leaving posts. The most famous of these agreed migrations was the Mariel boatlift of 1980.

==== Haiti ====
From 1991 through 1994, following the military coup d'état against President Jean-Bertrand Aristide, thousands of Haitians fled violence and repression by boat. Although most were repatriated to Haiti by the U.S. government, others entered the United States as refugees. Haitians were primarily regarded as economic migrants from the grinding poverty of Haiti, the poorest nation in the Western Hemisphere.

=== South America ===
==== Colombia ====
Colombia has one of the world's largest populations of internally displaced persons (IDPs), with estimates ranging from 2.6 to 4.3 million people, due to the ongoing Colombian armed conflict. The larger figure is cumulative since 1985. It is now estimated by the U.S. Committee for Refugees and Immigrants that there are about 150,000 Colombians in "refugee-like situations" in the United States, not recognized as refugees or subject to any formal protection.

==== Venezuela ====
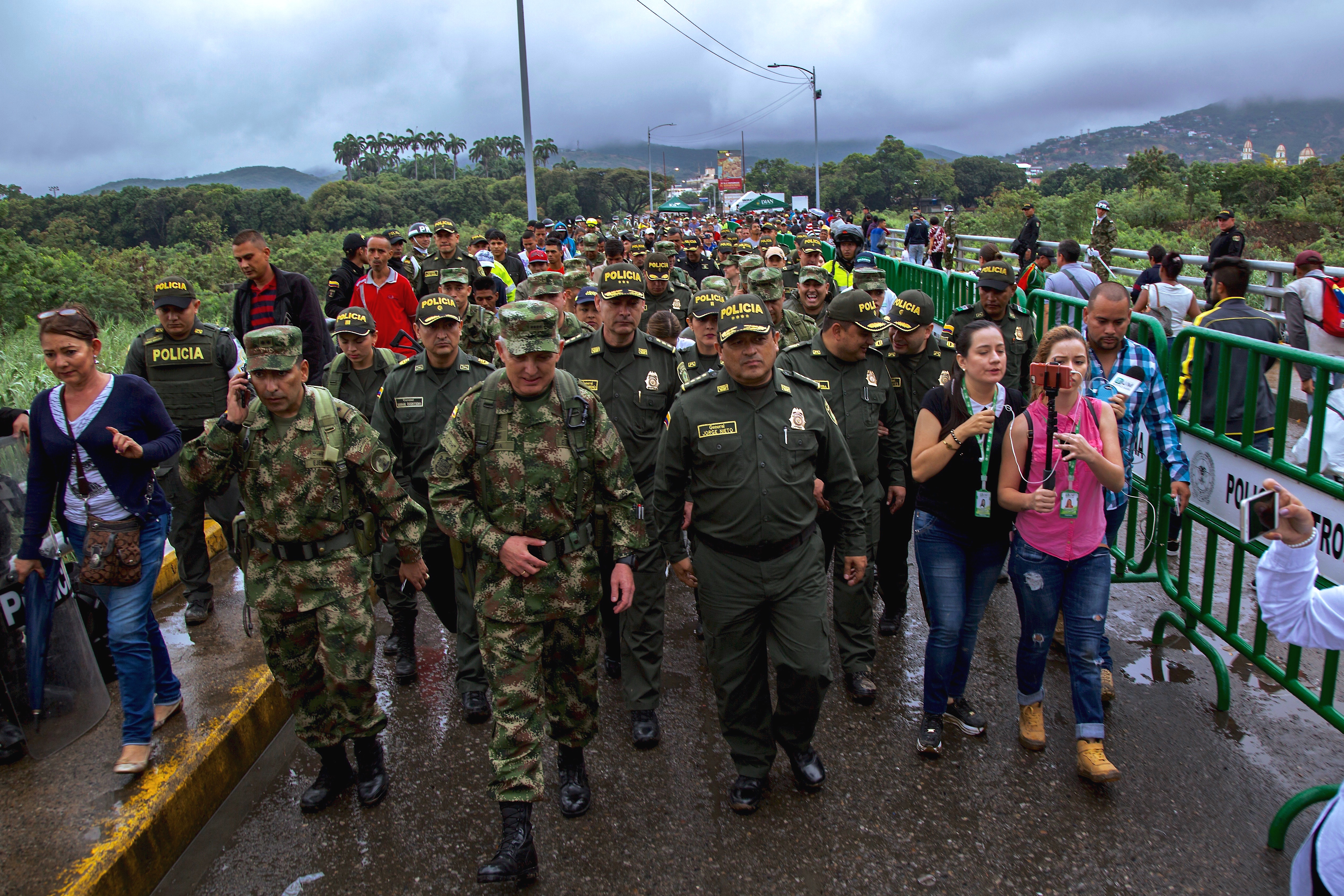
Colombian National Police leading Venezuelans departing from San Antonio del Táchira into Colombia

The Venezuelan diaspora is the large-scale emigration of millions of Venezuelans following the establishment of Hugo Chávez's Bolivarian Revolution and its continuation through Chávez's successors, Nicolás Maduro and Delcy Rodríguez. The Bolivarian government's policies resulted in increased crime, poverty, food shortages, and widespread corruption, all of which culminated into the crisis in Bolivarian Venezuela. The diaspora resulted in the largest recorded refugee crisis in the Americas. Between 1998 and 2018, about 4 million Venezuelans —over 10% of Venezuela's entire population— had emigrated from the Latin American country due to the crisis.

=== Asia ===
==== Afghanistan ====
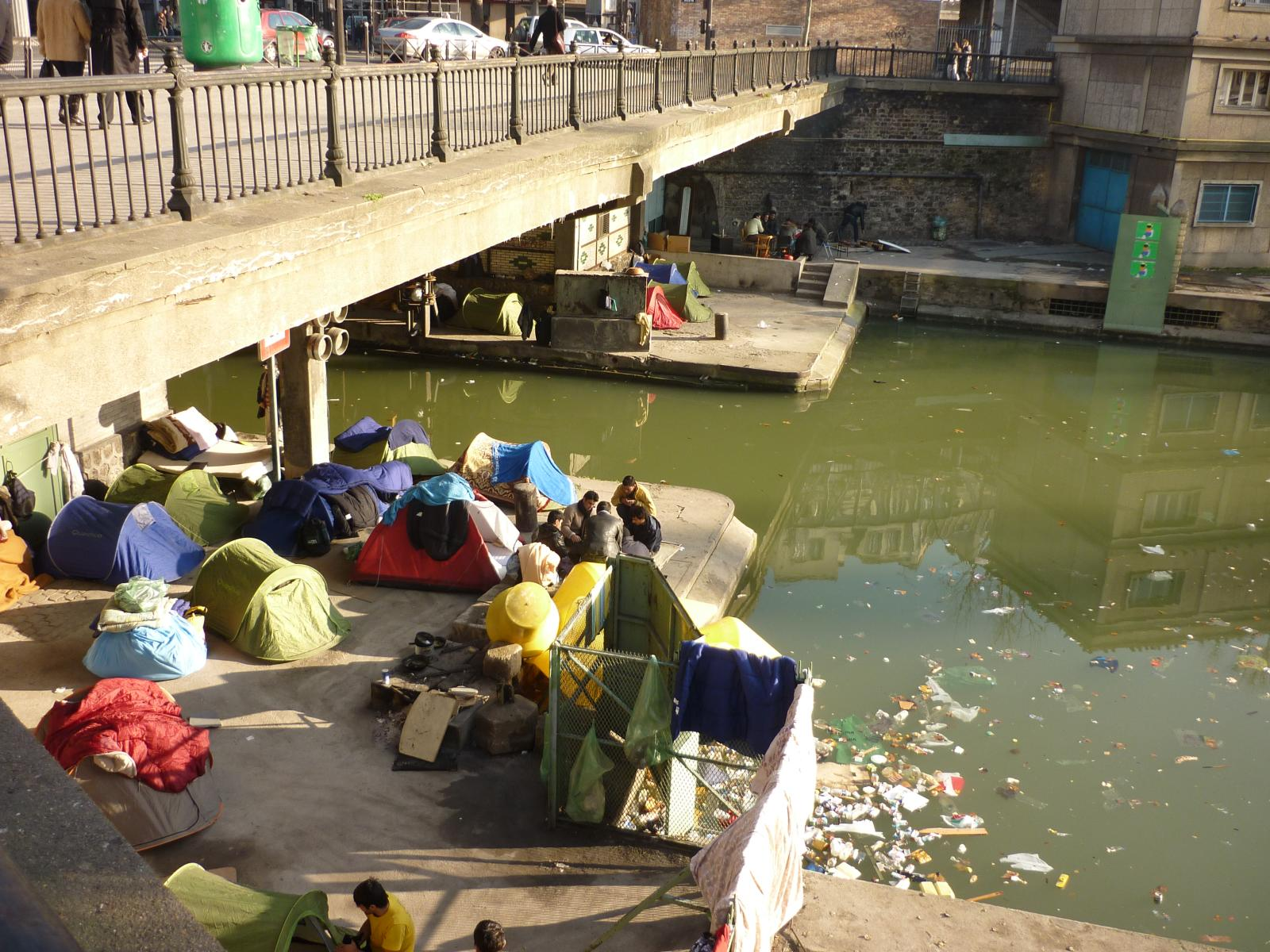
A group of young men camping by the Canal Saint-Martin in Paris, France, in 2010. According to the photographer the campers are Afghan refugees.

From the Soviet invasion in 1979 until the late 2001 U.S.-led invasion, a total of six million citizens of Afghanistan have migrated to neighboring parts of Pakistan and Iran. Since early 2002, however, more than 4 million of these Afghan refugees have voluntarily repatriated through the UNHCR from Pakistan to Afghanistan.

As of late 2016, some 1.3 million registered Afghan refugees still remain in Pakistan. Most of these were born and raised in Pakistan during the last 35 years but are still counted as citizens of Afghanistan. They were allowed to reside and work in Pakistan until the end of 2018.

In the meantime, about a million Afghans refugees remain in Iran, which include the many who were born inside Iran during the last 35 years. The number of Afghan refugees is decreasing significantly every year due to voluntary repatriation. For instance, in 2017 alone, over half a million of them returned to Afghanistan from Pakistan and Iran.

The 2011 industrialized country asylum data notes a 30% increase in applications from Afghans from 2010 to 2011, primarily towards Germany and Turkey.

==== Pakistan ====
Since the beginning US military intervention against the Taliban in Pakistan over 1.2 million people have been displaced in across the country, joined by a further 555,000 Pakistanis uprooted by fighting since August 2008.

==== India ====
===== The Partition of 1947 =====
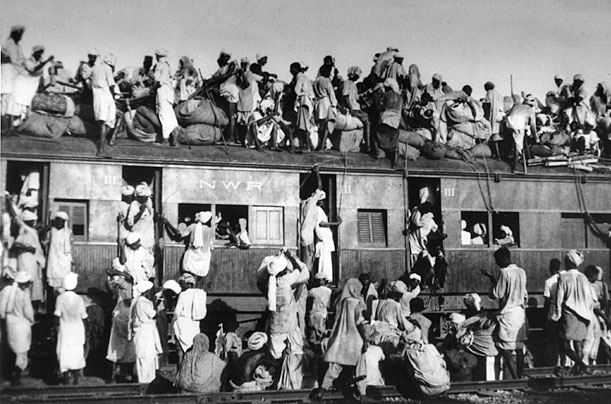
Overcrowded train transferring refugees during the partition of India, 1947. This was considered to be the largest migration in human history.

The partition of the British Raj provinces of Punjab and Bengal and the subsequent independence of Pakistan and one day later of India in 1947 resulted in the largest human movement in history. In this population exchange, approximately 7 million Hindus and Sikhs from Bangladesh and Pakistan moved to India while approximately 7 million Muslims from India moved to Pakistan. Approximately one million Muslims, Hindus and Sikhs died during this event.

===== Bangladeshis =====
As a result of the Bangladesh Liberation War, on 27 March 1971, Prime Minister of India, Indira Gandhi, expressed full support of her Government to the Bangladeshi struggle for freedom. The Bangladesh-India border was opened to allow panic-stricken Bangladeshis' safe shelter in India. The governments of West Bengal, Bihar, Assam, Meghalaya and Tripura established refugee camps along the border. Exiled Bangladeshi army officers and the Indian military immediately started using these camps for recruitment and training members of Mukti Bahini. During the Bangladesh War of Independence around 10 million Bangladeshis fled the country to escape the killings and atrocities committed by the Pakistan Army. Bangladeshi refugees are known as '"Chakmas"' in India. Other than chakmas there are Bengali Hindu refugee are also there who remain in India after war.

===== Sri Lankans =====
The civil war in Sri Lanka, from 1983 to 2009 had generated thousands of internally displaced people as well as refugees most of them being the Tamils. Many Sri Lankans have fled to neighbourly India and western countries such as Canada, France, Denmark, the United Kingdom, and Germany.

While successive policies of discrimination and intimidation of the Tamils drove thousands to flee seeking asylum, the brutal end to the Civil War and the ongoing repression have forced a wave of thousands of refugees migrate, to countries like Canada, the UK and especially Australia. Australia in particular, receives hundreds of refugees every month.

About 94,000 Sri Lankan Tamil refugees live in 107 camps in the southern Indian state of Tamil Nadu.

===== Jammu and Kashmir =====
According to the National Human Rights Commission (NHRC), about 300,000 Hindu Kashmiri Pandits have been forced to leave the state of Jammu and Kashmir due to Islamic militancy and religious discrimination from the Muslim majority, making them refugees in their own country. Some have found refuge in Jammu and its adjoining areas, while others in camps in Delhi and others in other states of India and other countries too. Kashmiri groups peg the number of migrants closer to 500,000.

==== Biharis ====
During the period of united Pakistan (1947–1971), the Urdu-speaking Biharis did not assimilate into the society of Bangladesh and have remained a distinct cultural-linguistic group ever since. after the Bangladesh Liberation War in 1971 the different linguistic group was assaulted by Bengalis because of their active participation with the Pakistani armed forces in committing genocide over the local populace. Some atrocities took place against Biharis. At the end of the war many Biharis took shelter in refugee camps in different cities, the biggest being the Geneva Camp in Dhaka. It is estimated that about 250,000 Biharis are living in those camps and in Rangpur and Dinajpur districts today. after 1971 many have still been living in Bangladesh while opting to be a repatriated to Pakistan.

==== Rohingyas ====
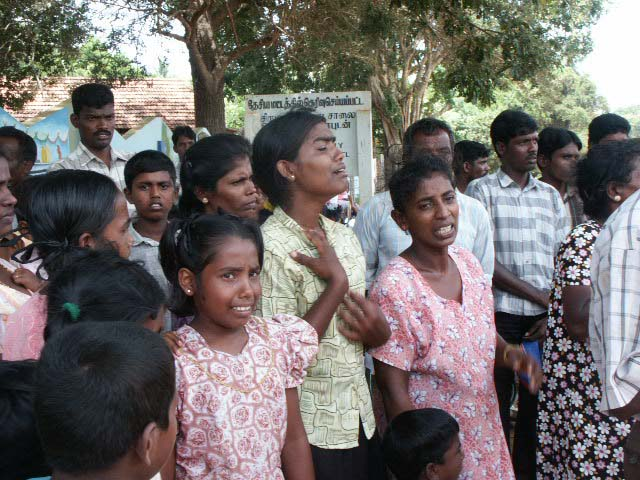
Tamil refugees in Sri Lanka

Bangladesh hosts around 860,000 Muslim Rohingya refugees who were forced out of their homes in western Burma (Myanmar) and fled in 2017 and earlier in 1991–92 in order to escape persecution by the Burmese military junta. Many have lived there for close to twenty years. The Bangladeshi government divides the Rohingya into two categories – recognized refugees living in official camps and unrecognized refugees living in unofficial sites or among Bangladeshi communities. Around 30,000 Rohingyas are residing in two camps in the Nayapara and Kutupalong areas of the Cox's Bazar district in Bangladesh. These camp residents have access to basic services, those outside do not. With no changes inside Burma in sight, Bangladesh must come to terms with the long-term needs of all the Rohingya refugees in the country and allow international organizations to expand services that benefit the Rohingya as well as local communities.

The agency has been supporting Rohingya refugees staying in the camps. On the other hand, it is not receiving applications for refugee status from the newly arrived Rohingyas. This amounts to a compromise of its mandate. The brutal campaign of ethnic cleansing against Muslims in Arakan State by the Burmese military in 1991-92 caused a refugee crisis in which thousands of people have been detained in crowded refugee camps in Bangladesh and tens of thousands of others have been repatriated to Burma where they face further repression. There are widespread allegations of religious persecution, use of forced labor and denial of citizenship to many Rohingyas who were forced to return to Burma since 1996. Many have again fled to Bangladesh in order to seek work or shelter, or to flee from Burmese military oppression, and some are forced across the border by Burmese security forces. In the past few months, abuses against Rohingya in Arakan State have continued, including strict registration laws that continue to deny Rohingya citizenship, restrictions on their movement, land confiscation and forced evictions to make way for Buddhist Burmese settlements, widespread forced labor in infrastructure projects and the closure of some mosques, including nine in the North Buthidaung Township of Western Arakan State in the last half of 2006.

An estimated 90,000 people were displaced in the 2012 sectarian violence between Rohingya Muslims and Buddhists in Burma's western Rakhine State.

There are also large numbers of Muslim Rohingya refugees in Pakistan. Most of them have made perilous journeys across Bangladesh and India and settled in Karachi.

==== Nepal ====
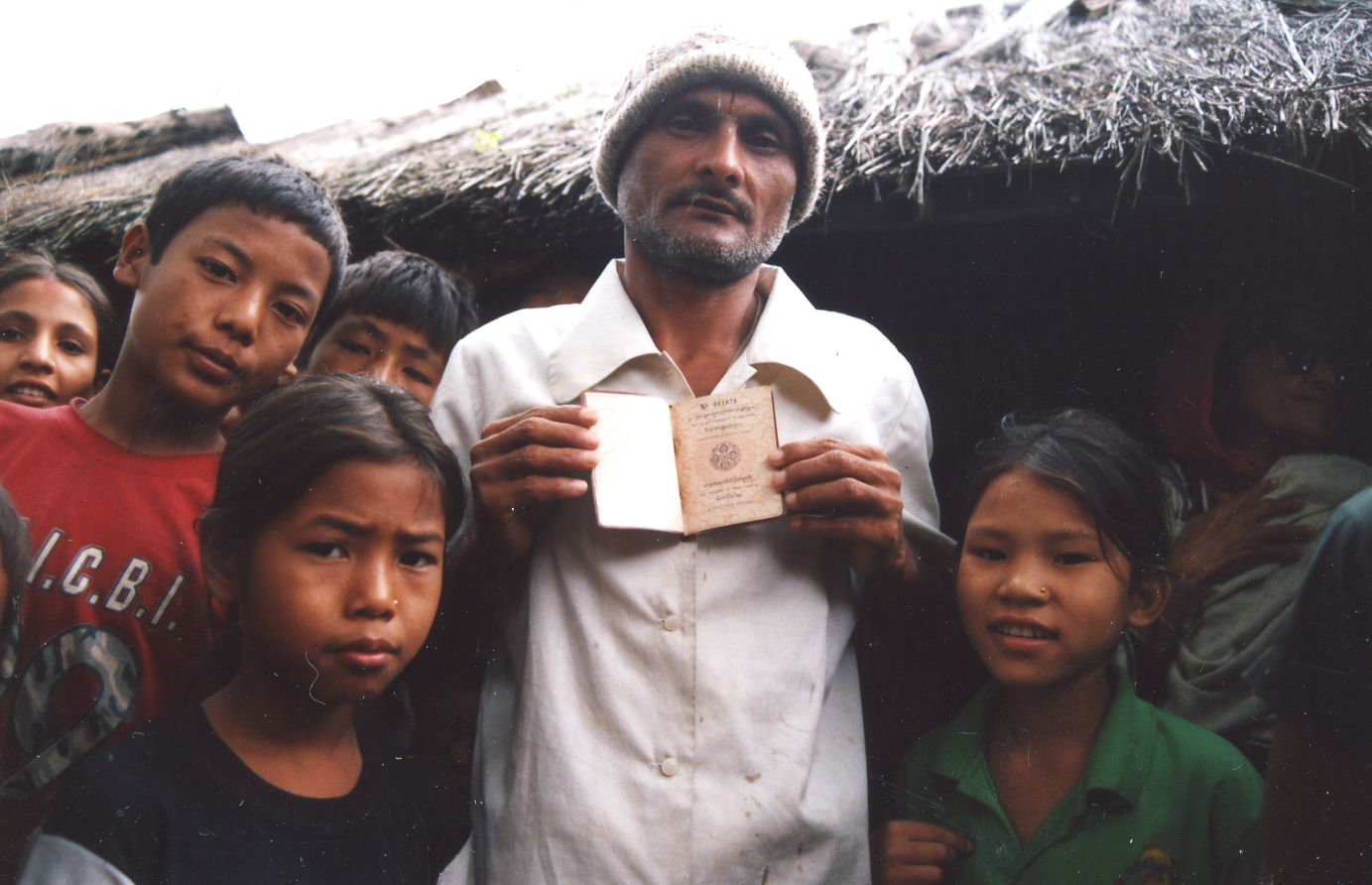
Bhutanese of Nepali origin who fled to Nepal in the early 1990s

After the 1959 Tibetan exodus, there are more than 150,000 Tibetans who live in Nepal. These include people who have escaped over the Himalayas from Tibet, as well as their children and grandchildren. In Nepal the overwhelming majority of Tibetans born in Nepal are still stateless and carry a document called an Identity Card issued by the Nepalese government in lieu of a passport. This document states the nationality of the holder as Tibetan. It is a document that is frequently rejected as a valid travel document by many customs and immigrations departments. The Tibetan refugees also own a Green Book issued by the Tibetan Government in Exile for rights and duties towards this administration.

In 1991–92, Bhutan expelled roughly 100,000 ethnic Nepalis known as Lhotshampas from the southern part of the country. Most of them have been living in seven refugee camps run by UNHCR in eastern Nepal ever since. In March 2008, this population began a multiyear resettlement to other countries including the United States, New Zealand, Denmark, Canada, Norway and Australia. At present, the United States is working towards resettling more than 60,000 of these refugees in the US as a third country settlement programme.

Meanwhile, as many as 200,000 Nepalese were displaced during the Maoist insurgency and Nepalese Civil War which ended in 2006.

By 2009, more than 3 million civilians had been displaced by the Insurgency in Khyber Pakhtunkhwa (2004–present).

==== Tajikistan ====
Since 1991, much of the country's non-Muslim population, including non-ethnic Tajikistan's Russians and Bukharian Jews, have fled Tajikistan due to severe poverty, instability and Tajikistani Civil War (1992–1997). In 1992, most of the country's Jewish population was evacuated to Israel. Most of the ethnic Russian population fled to Russia. By the end of the civil war Tajikistan was in a state of complete devastation. Around 1.2 million people were refugees inside and outside of the country. Due to severe poverty a lot of Tajiks had to migrate to Russia.47% of Tajikistan's GDP comes from immigrant remittances (from Tajiks working in Russia).

==== Uzbekistan ====
In 1989, after bloody pogroms against the Meskhetian Turks in Central Asia's Ferghana Valley, nearly 90,000 Meskhetian Turks left Uzbekistan.

The 2010 ethnic violence in Kyrgyzstan left some 300,000 people internally displaced, and around 100,000 sought refuge in Uzbekistan.

==== Southeast Asia (Vietnam War) ====
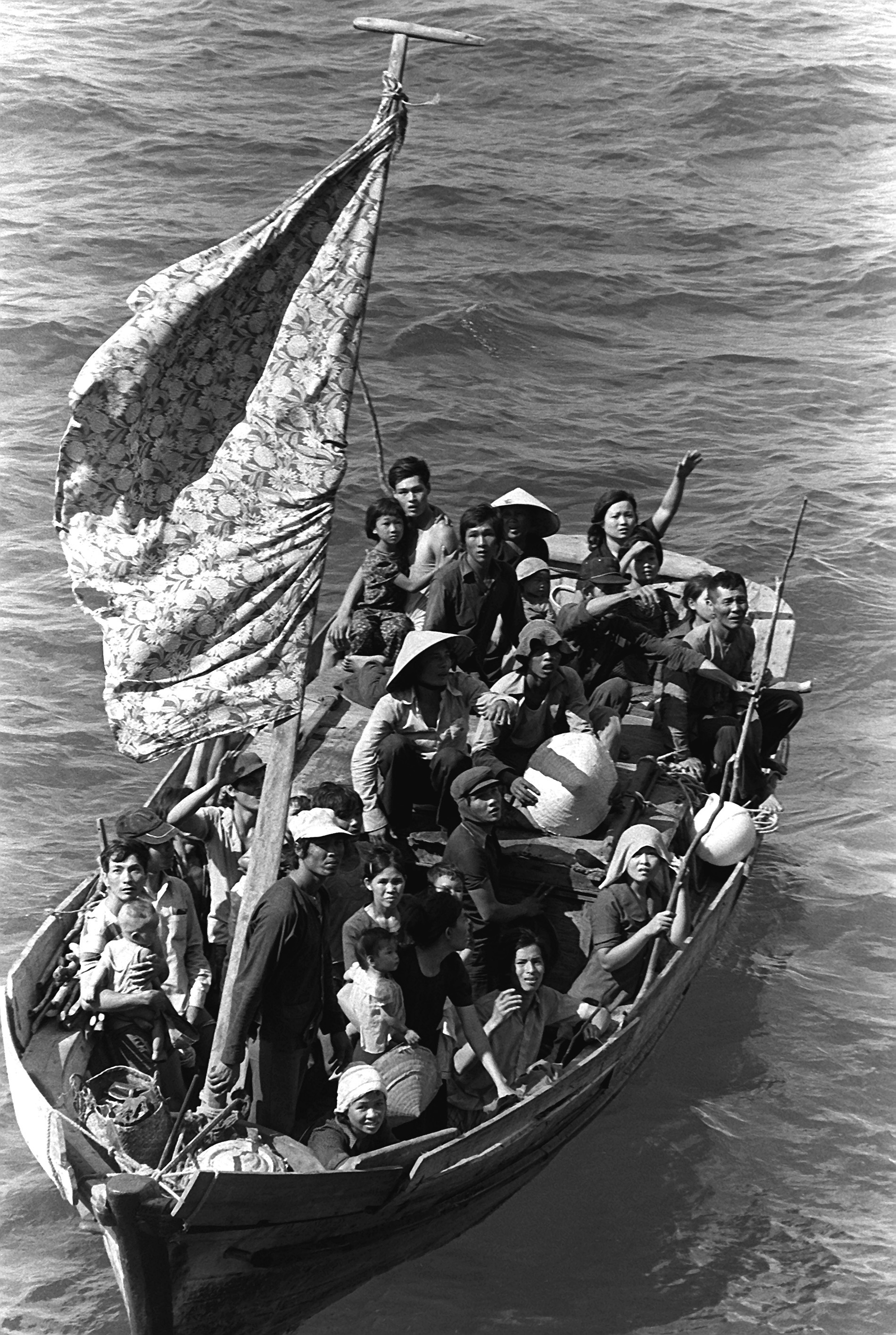
Vietnamese boat people, 1984

After the communist takeovers in Vietnam, Cambodia, and Laos in 1975, about three million people attempted to escape in the subsequent decades. With the massive influx of refugees daily, the resources of the receiving countries were severely strained. The plight of the boat people became an international humanitarian crisis. The United Nations High Commissioner for Refugees (UNHCR) set up refugee camps in neighboring countries to process the boat people. The budget of the UNHCR increased from $80 million in 1975 to $500 million in 1980. Partly for its work in Indochina, the UNHCR was awarded the 1981 Nobel Peace Prize.

- Large numbers of Vietnamese refugees came into existence after 1975 when South Vietnam fell to the communist forces. Many tried to escape, some by boat, thus giving rise to the phrase "boat people". The Vietnamese refugees emigrated to Hong Kong, France, the United States, Canada, Australia, and other countries, creating sizeable expatriate communities, notably in the United States. Since 1975, an estimated 1.4 million refugees from Vietnam and other Southeast Asian countries have been resettled to the United States. Most Asian countries were unwilling to accept refugees.
- Survivors of the Khmer Rouge regime in Cambodia fled across the border into Thailand after the Vietnamese invasion of 1978–79. Approximately 300,000 of these people were eventually resettled in the United States, France, Canada, and Australia between 1979 and 1992, when the camps were closed and the remaining people repatriated.
- Nearly 400,000 Laotians fled to Thailand after the Vietnam War and communist takeover in 1975. Some left because of persecution by the government for religious or ethnic purposes. Most left between 1976 and 1985 and lived in refugee camps along the border between Thailand and Laos. They mostly settled in the United States, Canada, France, and Australia. In the United States they mostly settled in Washington State, California, Washington, D.C., Texas, Virginia, and Minnesota.
- The Mien or Yao recently lived in northern Vietnam, northern Laos and northern Thailand. In 1975, the Pathet Lao forces began seeking reprisal for the involvement of many Mien as soldiers in the CIA-sponsored militias in the Laotian Civil War. As a token of appreciation to the Mien and Hmong people who served in the CIA secret army, the United States accepted many of the refugees as naturalized citizens (Mien American). Many more Hmong continue to seek asylum in neighboring Thailand.
- Due to the persecution of the ethnic Karen, Karenni and other minority populations in Burma (Myanmar) significant numbers of refugees live along the Thai border in camps of up to 100,000 people. Since 2006, over 55,000 Burmese refugees have been resettled in the United States.
- Muslim ethnic groups supposed to be from Burma, the Rohingya and other Arakanese have been living in camps in Bangladesh since the 1990s. Both Bangladesh and Burma claimed that the Rohingya are not their citizens.

=== West Asia ===
==== Armenians ====
Azerbaijan launched a military offensive in September 2023, following a ten-month military siege of Nagorno-Karabakh (Artsakh) involving the sabotage of public infrastructure and the blockade of essential supplies, which caused a humanitarian crisis. Before the Second Nagorno-Karabakh War in 2020, the region had an estimated population of 150,000 which decreased in the aftermath of the war. Faced with extreme anti-Armenian sentiment and threats of violence, over 100,000 ethnic Armenians — representing 99% of the remaining population of Nagorno-Karabakh, — fled to Armenia, triggering a refugee crisis. Observers, including international leaders and human rights organizations, have characterized the displacement as ethnic cleansing or a crime against humanity. Armenia has struggled to absorb and support the incoming refugees, facing acute challenges in funding, housing, and long-term integration for those uprooted.

==== Palestinians ====
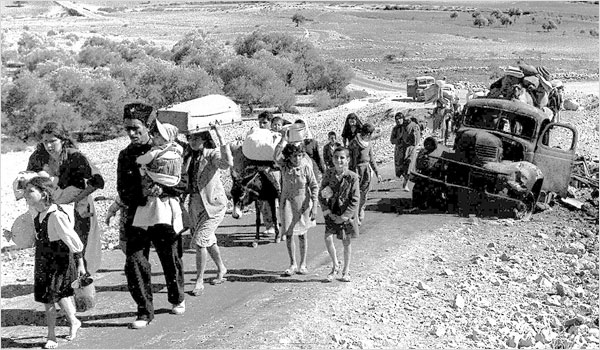
Palestinian refugees leaving the Galilee in October–November 1948

A heavy exodus of the non-Jewish population of Palestine took place in 1948. Though usually described as byproduct of the 1948 Arab-Israeli War, the first and largest wave of Palestinian refugees took place in early 1948, shortly after the Deir Yassin massacre—preceding, therefore, said war, with expulsions of Palestinians continuing to happen for some years thereafter. According to files belonging to the Israeli army that came under the attention of Israeli historians such as Benny Morris, the overwhelming majority (about 73%) of Palestinian refugees left as a result of actions undertaken by Zionist militias and Jewish authorities, with a smaller percentage, about 5%, leaving voluntarily. By the end of 1948, there were about 700,000 Palestinian refugees.

Following the departure of refugees, properties, lands, money, and bank accounts belonging to Palestinians were frozen and confiscated. Jewish ownership of the land, which by late 1947 accounted for less than 6% of Mandatory Palestine and less than 10% of the territory the UN allotted to the Jewish state, swelled.

Dispossession and displacement of Palestinians continued in the decades after Israel's independence, and renewal of conflicts between Israel and its neighbors. During the 1967 war, about 400,000 Palestinians, half of whom were 1948 refugees, fled their lands in the West Bank following advances by the Israeli army and settled in Jordan. In the 2000s, Israel blacklisted the refugees from that war to impede them from returning and reclaiming their properties and lands, which have been allocated to Jewish settlements and Israeli military bases. Israel has also admitted to revoking the residency rights of 250,000 Palestinians in the occupied territories in the period between 1967 and 1994, the year of the establishment of the Palestinian Authority, after they left temporarily to study and work abroad.

Palestinian refugees and their descendants spread throughout the Arab world; the largest populations are found in neighboring Levantine countries—Syria, Lebanon and Jordan. The populations of the West Bank and Gaza are also composed to a large extent of refugees and their descendants. Until 1967, the West Bank and Gaza were officially ruled, respectively, by Jordan and Egypt. Jordan's Hashemite Kingdom was the only Arab government to have granted citizenship to Palestinian refugees.

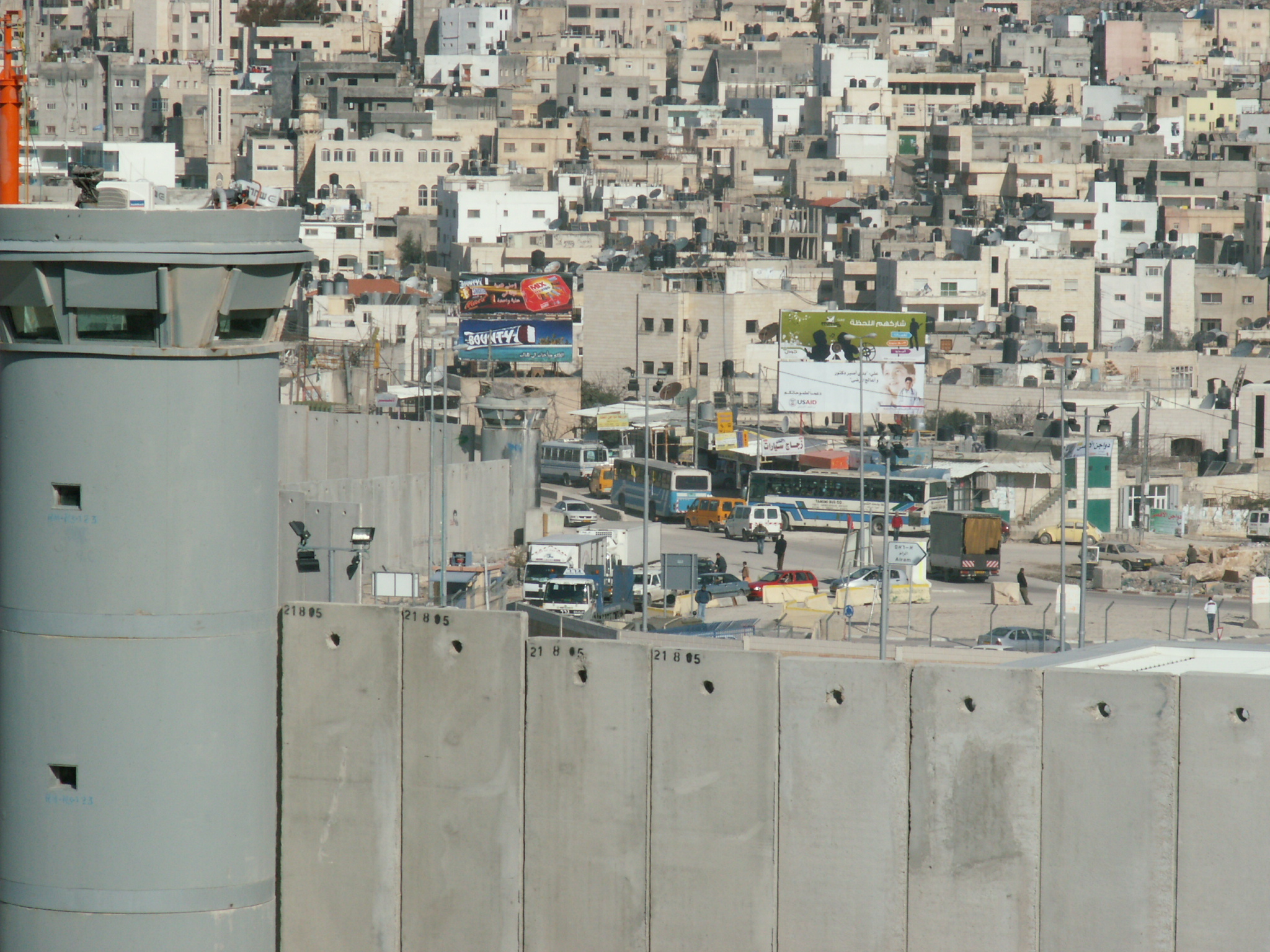
Kalandia refugee camp, West Bank

Palestinian refugees from 1948 and their descendants do not come under the 1951 UN Convention Relating to the Status of Refugees, but under the UN Relief and Works Agency for Palestine Refugees in the Near East, which created its own criteria for refugee classification. The great majority of Palestinian refugees have kept the refugee status for generations, under a special decree of the UN, and legally defined to include descendants of refugees, as well as others who might otherwise be considered internally displaced persons.

As of December 2005, the World Refugee Survey of the U.S. Committee for Refugees and Immigrants estimates the total number of Palestinian refugees and their descendants to be 2,966,100. Palestinian refugees number almost half of Jordan's population, however they have assimilated into Jordanian society, having a full citizenship. In Syria, though not officially becoming citizens, most of the Palestinian refugees were granted resident rights and issued travel documents. Following the Oslo Agreements, attempts were made to integrate the displaced Palestinians and their descendants into the Palestinian community. In addition, Israel granted permissions for family reunions and return of only about 10,000 Fatah members to the West Bank. The refugee situation and the presence of numerous refugee camps continues to be a point of contention in the Israeli–Palestinian conflict.

The Palestinian exodus from Kuwait took place during and after the Gulf War. There were 400,000 Palestinians in Kuwait before the Gulf War. During the Gulf War, more than 200,000 Palestinians fled Kuwait during the Iraqi occupation of Kuwait due to harassment and intimidation by Iraqi security forces, in addition to getting fired from work by Iraqi authority figures in Kuwait. After the Gulf War in 1991, Kuwaiti authorities pressured nearly 200,000 Palestinians to leave Kuwait. The policy which partly led to this exodus was a response to the alignment of PLO leader Yasser Arafat with Saddam Hussein.

As of January 2024, more than 85% of Palestinians in Gaza, approximately 1.9 million people, were internally displaced during the Gaza war.

==== Jews of Arab and Muslim countries ====
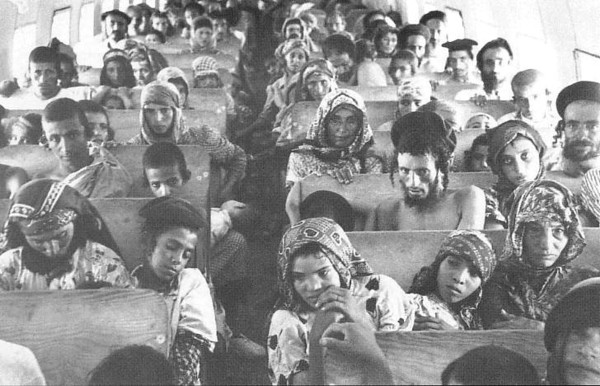
Yemenite Jews en route from Aden to Israel, during the Magic Carpet operation (1949–1950)

The Jewish exodus from the Muslim world was the departure, flight, expulsion, evacuation and migration, of 850,000 Jews, primarily of Sephardi and Mizrahi background, from Arab and Muslim countries, mainly from 1948 to the early 1970s. They and their descendants make up the majority of Israeli Jews.

A number of small-scale Jewish exoduses began in many Middle Eastern countries early in the 20th century with the only substantial aliyah coming from Yemen and Syria. Prior to the creation of Israel in 1948, approximately 800,000 Jews were living in lands that now make up the Arab world. Of these, just under two-thirds lived in the French and Italian-controlled North Africa, 15–20% in the Kingdom of Iraq, approximately 10% in the Kingdom of Egypt and approximately 7% in the Kingdom of Yemen. A further 200,000 lived in Pahlavi Iran and the Republic of Turkey.

The first large-scale exoduses took place in the late 1940s and early 1950s, primarily from Iraq, Yemen and Libya. In these cases over 90% of the Jewish population left, despite the necessity of leaving their property behind. Two hundred and sixty thousand Jews from Arab countries immigrated to Israel between 1948 and 1951, accounting for 56% of the total immigration to the newly founded state. Following the establishment of the State of Israel, a plan to accommodate 600,000 immigrants over four years, doubling the existing Jewish population, was submitted by the Israeli government to the Knesset. The plan, however, encountered mixed reactions; there were those within the Jewish Agency and government who opposed promoting a large-scale emigration movement among Jews whose lives were not in danger.

Later waves peaked at different times in different regions over the subsequent decades. The peak of the exodus from Egypt occurred in 1956 following the Suez Crisis. The exodus from the other North African Arab countries peaked in the 1960s. Lebanon was the only Arab country to see a temporary increase in its Jewish population during this period, due to an influx of Jews from other Arab countries, although by the mid-1970s the Jewish community of Lebanon had also dwindled. Six hundred thousand Jews from Arab and Muslim countries had reached Israel by 1972. In total, of the 900,000 Jews who left Arab and other Muslim countries, 600,000 settled in the new state of Israel, and 300,000 immigrated to France and the United States. The descendants of the Jewish immigrants from the region, known as Mizrahi Jews ("Eastern Jews") and Sephardic Jews ("Spanish Jews"), currently constitute more than half of the total population of Israel, partially as a result of their higher fertility rate. In 2009, only 26,000 Jews remained in Arab countries and Iran and 26,000 in Turkey.

The reasons for the exodus included push factors, such as persecution, antisemitism, political instability, poverty and expulsion, together with pull factors, such as the desire to fulfill Zionist yearnings or find a better economic status and a secure home in Europe or the Americas. The history of the exodus has been politicized, given its proposed relevance to the historical narrative of the Arab–Israeli conflict.

==== Syrians displaced from the Golan Heights ====
After the 1967 war, when Israel launched pre-emptive attacks on Egypt and Syrian and annexed the Golan Heights. Israel destroyed 139 Syrian villages in the occupied territory of the Golan Heights and 130,000 of its residents fled or were expelled from their lands, which now serve the purpose of settlements and military bases. About 9,000 Syrians, all of whom of the Druze ethno-religious group, were allowed to remain in their lands.

==== Cyprus crisis of 1974 ====
It is estimated that 40% of the Greek population of Cyprus, as well as over half of the Turkish Cypriot population, were displaced during the Turkish invasion of Cyprus in 1974. The figures for internally displaced Cypriots varies, the United Peacekeeping force in Cyprus (UNFICYP) estimates 165,000 Greek Cypriots and 45,000 Turkish Cypriots. The UNHCR registers slightly higher figures of 200,000 and 65,000 respectively, being partly based on official Cypriot statistics which register children of displaced families as refugees. The separation of the two communities via the UN patrolled Green Line prohibited the return of all internally displaced people.

==== Lebanon Civil War, 1975–90 ====
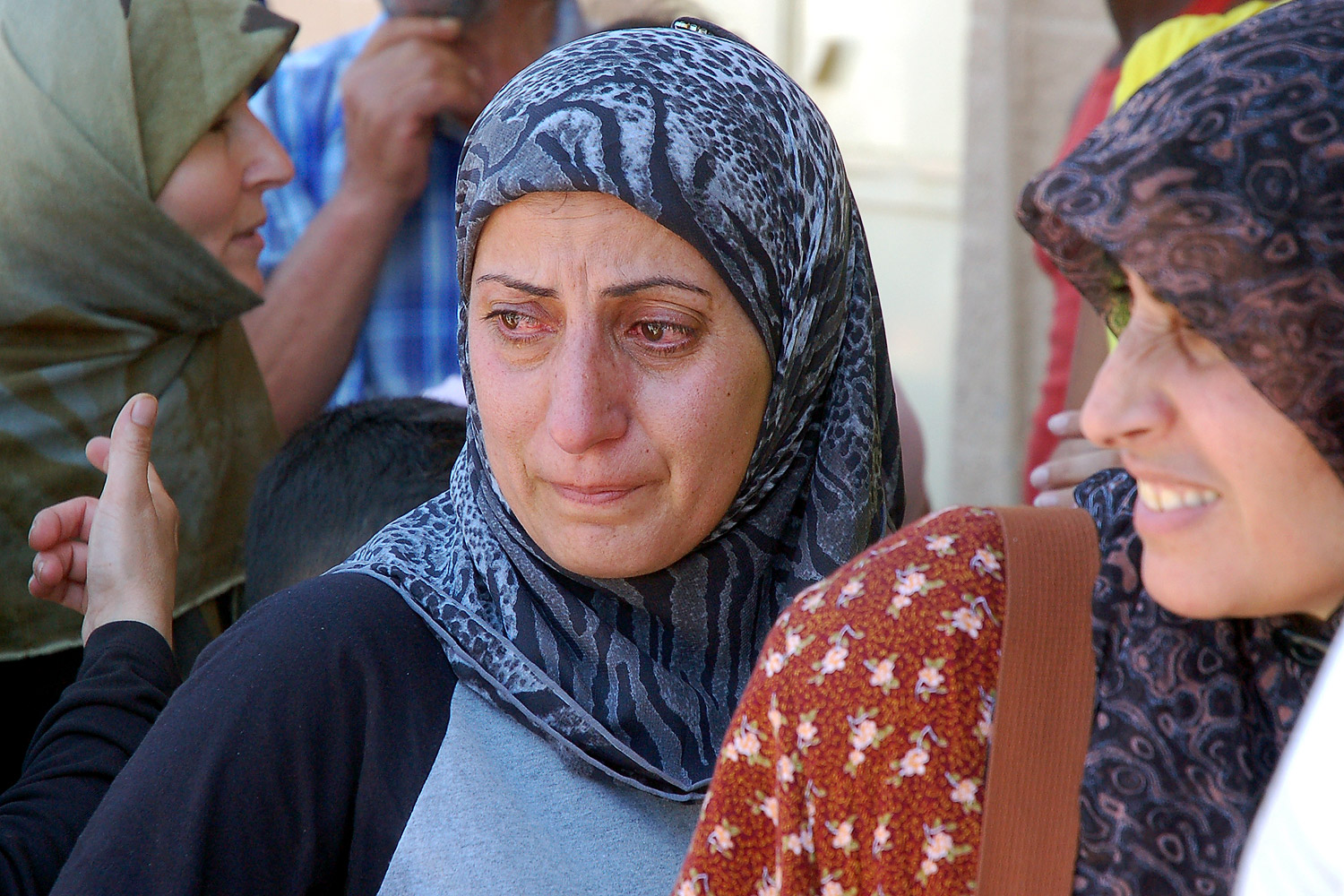
Lebanese refugees in south Lebanon, 2006

It is estimated that some 900,000 people, representing one-fifth of the pre-war population, were displaced from their homes during the Lebanese Civil War.

==== Kurdish refugees, Turkish conflict, 1984–present ====
Between 1984 and 1999, the Turkish Armed Forces and various groups claiming to represent the Kurdish people have engaged in open war, and much of the countryside in the southeast was depopulated, with Kurdish civilians moving to local defensible centers such as Diyarbakır, Van, and Şırnak, as well as to the cities of western Turkey and even to western Europe. The causes of the depopulation included Kurdistan Workers' Party atrocities against Kurdish clans they could not control, the poverty of the southeast, and the Turkish state's military operations. Human Rights Watch has documented many instances where the Turkish military forcibly evacuated villages, destroying houses and equipment to prevent the return of the inhabitants. An estimated 3,000 Kurdish villages in Turkey were virtually wiped from the map, representing the displacement of more than 378,000 people.

==== Iran–Iraq war ====
The Iran–Iraq War from 1980 to 1988, the 1990 Iraqi invasion of Kuwait, the first Gulf War and subsequent conflicts all generated hundreds of thousands if not millions of refugees. Iran also provided asylum for 1,400,000 Iraqi refugees who had been uprooted as a result of the 1991 uprisings in Iraq (1990–91). At least one million Iraqi Kurds were displaced during the Anfal campaign (1986–1989).

==== Iraq War (2003–present) ====
The Iraq War has generated millions of refugees and internally displaced persons. As of 2007 more Iraqis have lost their homes and become refugees than the population of any other country. Over 4,700,000 people, more than 16% of the Iraqi population, have become uprooted. Of these, about 2 million have fled Iraq and flooded other countries, and 2.7 million are estimated to be refugees inside Iraq, with nearly 100,000 Iraqis fleeing to Syria and Jordan each month. Only 1% of the total Iraqi displaced population was estimated to be in the Western countries.

Roughly 40% of Iraq's middle class is believed to have fled, the U.N. said. Most are fleeing systematic persecution and have no desire to return. All kinds of people, from university professors to bakers, have been targeted by militias, insurgents and criminals. An estimated 331 school teachers were slain in the first four months of 2006, according to Human Rights Watch, and at least 2,000 Iraqi doctors have been killed and 250 kidnapped since the 2003 U.S. invasion. Iraqi refugees in Syria and Jordan live in impoverished communities with little international attention to their plight and little legal protection. In Syria alone an estimated 50,000 Iraqi girls and women, many of them widows, are forced into prostitution just to survive.

According to Washington-based Refugees International, out of the 4.2 million refugees fewer than 800 have been allowed into the US since the 2003 invasion. Sweden had accepted 18,000 and Australia had resettled almost 6,000. By 2006 Sweden had granted protection to more Iraqis than all the other EU Member States combined. However, and following repeated unanswered calls to its European partners for greater solidarity, July 2007 saw Sweden introduce a more restrictive policy towards Iraqi asylum seekers, which is expected to reduce the recognition rate in 2008.

As of September 2007 Syria had decided to implement a strict visa regime to limit the number of Iraqis entering the country at up to 5,000 per day, cutting the only accessible escape route for thousands of refugees fleeing the civil war in Iraq. A government decree that took effect on 10 September 2007 bars Iraqi passport holders from entering Syria except for businessmen and academics. Until then, Syria was the only country that had resisted strict entry regulations for Iraqis.

In June 2014, More than 500,000 people fled Mosul to escape from the advancing Islamic State of Iraq and Syria (ISIS).

===== Mandaeans and Yazidis =====
Since 2007, the small Mandaean and Yazidi communities have been at risk of elimination due to ethnic cleansing by Islamic militants. Entire neighborhoods in Baghdad were ethnically cleansed by Shia and Sunni Militias. Satellite shows ethnic cleansing in Iraq was key factor in "surge" success.

===== Refugees in Jordan =====
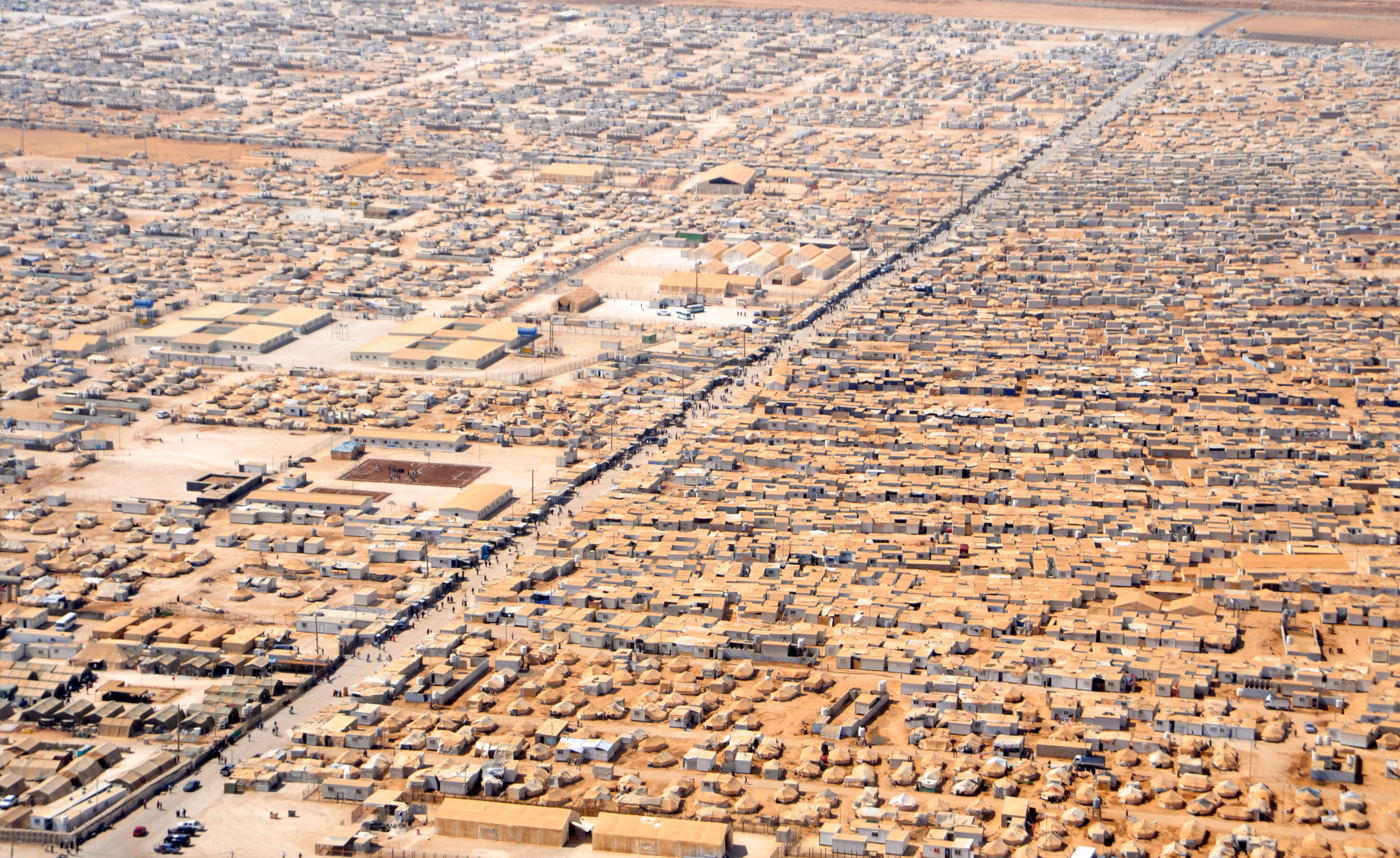
Za'atri camp for Syrian refugees in Jordan

Jordan has one of the world's largest immigrant populations with some sources putting the immigrant percentage to being 60%. Iraqi refugees number between 750,000 and 1 million in Jordan with most living in Amman. Jordan also has Armenian, Chechen, Circassian minorities, and about half of its population is said to be of Palestinian refugees and their descendants.

==== Syrian refugees ====
To escape the violence, nearly 4,088,078 Syrian refugees have fled the country to neighboring Jordan, Lebanon, Turkey and Iraq.

==== African refugees in Israel ====
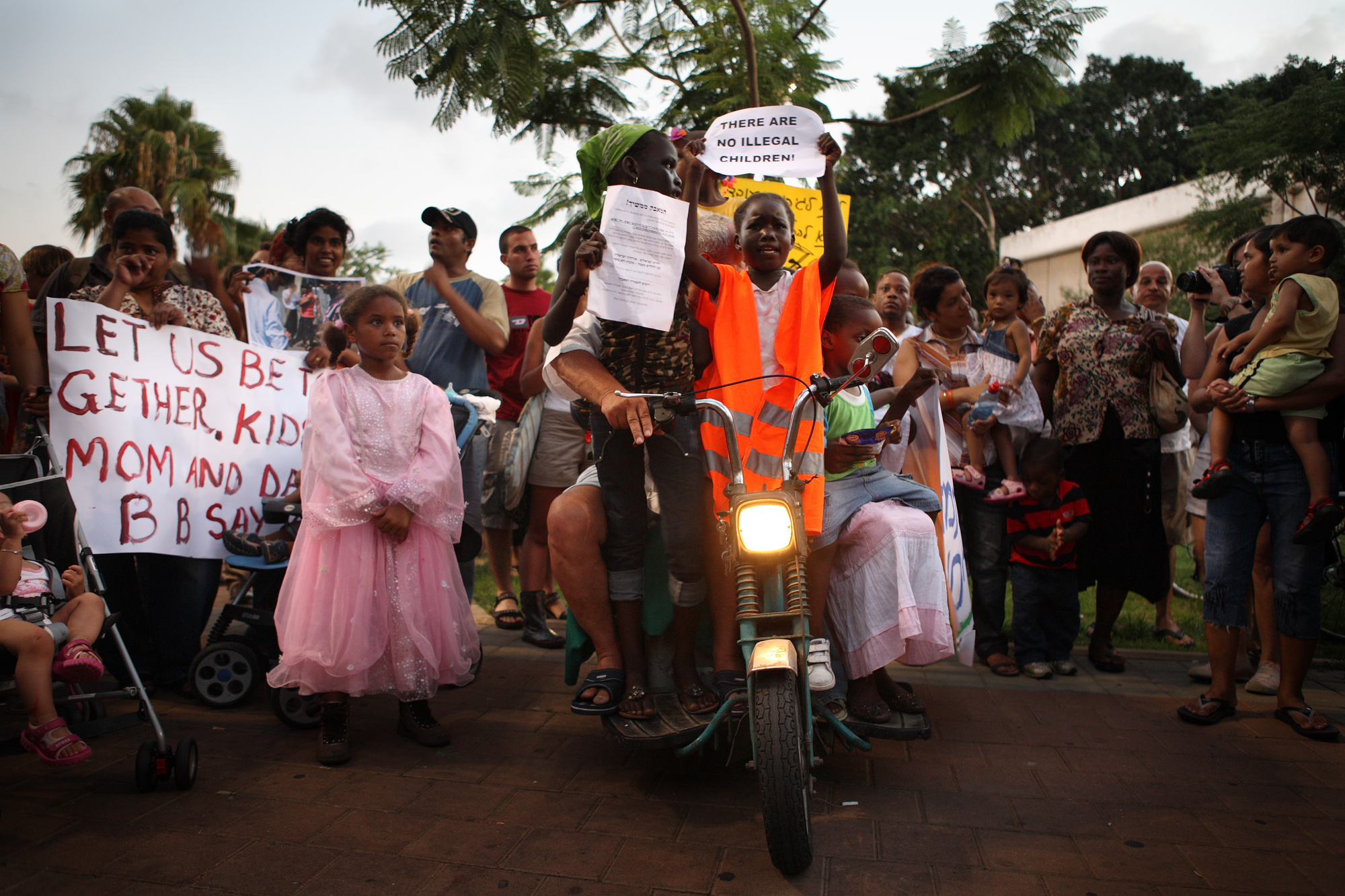
Demonstration against the expulsion of refugees and their families from Israel in Tel Aviv, 2009

Since 2003, an estimated 70,000 immigrants arrived illegally from various African countries into Israel. Some 600 refugees from the Darfur region of Sudan have been granted temporary resident status that is to be renewed every year, although not official refugee status. Another 2,000 refugees from the conflict between Eritrea and Ethiopia have been granted temporary resident status on humanitarian grounds. Israel prefers not to recognize them as refugees so as not to offend Eritrea and Ethiopia. The Sudanese, who are from an enemy state, are also not recognized as refugees. In effect, Israeli politicians, including the current prime minister Benjamin Netanyahu, have referred to the refugees as a threat to Israel's "Jewish character". African refugees are sometimes subject to racism and racial riots, as well as physical assaults. These assaults have been occurring in Israel, especially in southern Tel Aviv since mid-2012.

Over the past years, conflicts have occurred between Israelis and African immigrants in southern Tel Aviv, mostly due to poverty issues on both sides. Locals accuse African immigrants of rape, Stealing and assault, making racial issues emerge in the southern part of Tel Aviv, which became an immigrant-populated area.

In 2012, Reuters reported that Israel may jail "illegal immigrants" for up to three years under a law put into effect to stem the flow of Africans across the desert border with Egypt. Netanyahu said in effect that, "If we don't stop their entry, the problem that currently stands at 60,000 could grow to 600,000, and that threatens our existence as a uniquely Jewish and democratic state."

=== Europe ===
==== Jewish refugees ====
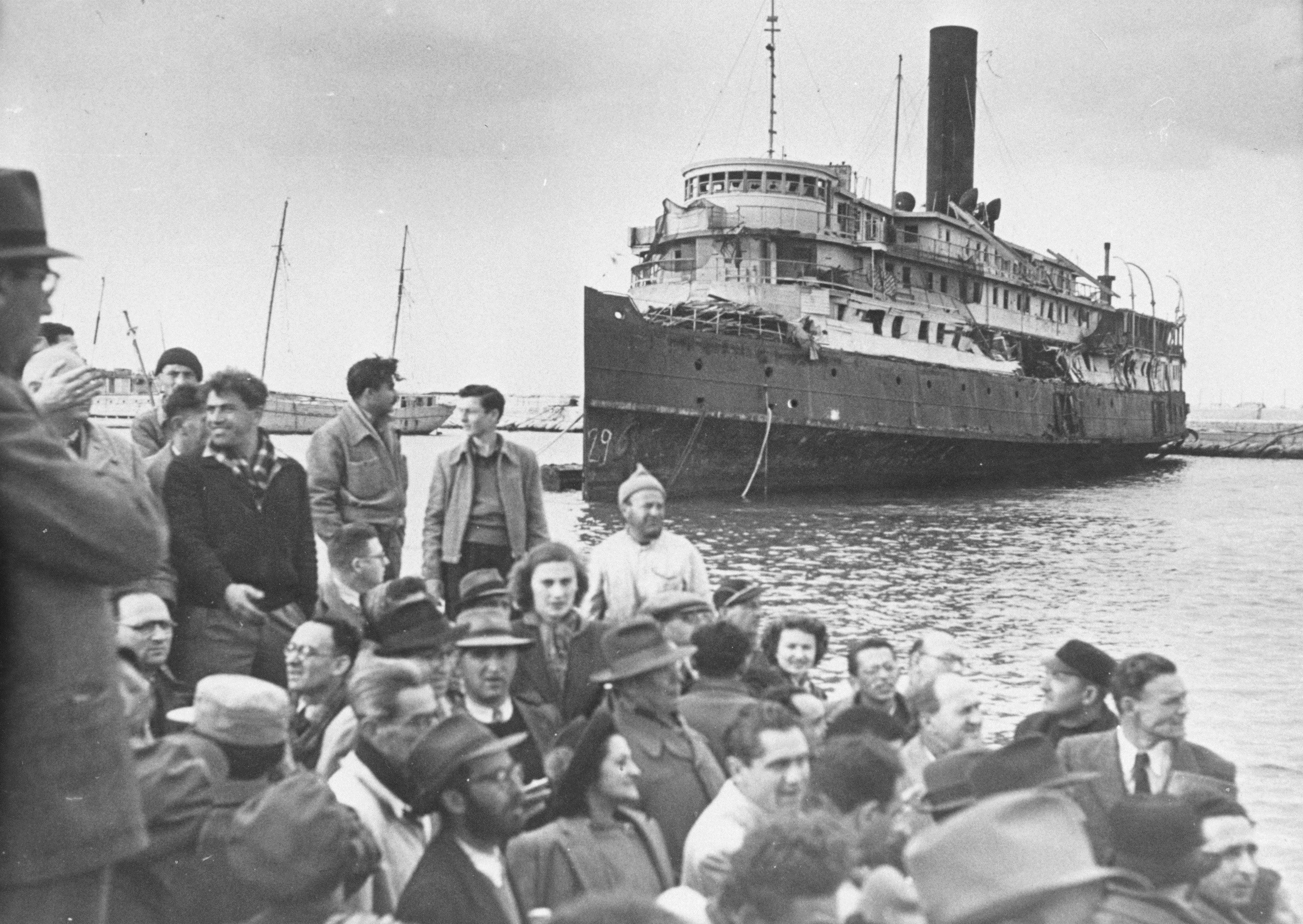
Jewish refugees, mainly Holocaust survivors arriving in Palestine, 1947

Between the first and second world wars, hundreds of thousands of European Jews, mainly from Germany and Austria attempted to flee the German government's anti-semitic policies which culminated in the Holocaust and the mass murder of millions of European Jews. These Jews were often found it difficult or impossible to immigrate to other European countries. The 1938 Evian Conference, the 1943 Bermuda Conference and other attempts failed to resolve the problem of Jewish refugees, a fact widely used in Nazi propaganda.

Since its founding at the beginning of the 1900s Jewish immigration to the British Mandate for Palestine was encouraged by the nascent Zionist movement, but immigration was restricted by the British government, under the pressure from Palestinian Arabs. Following its formation in 1948, according to 1947 UN Partition Plan, Israel adopted the Law of Return, granting Israeli citizenship to any Jewish immigrant. Mass rioting and attacks on Jews throughout the Muslim World following the creation of the state of Israel led to the Jewish exodus from Arab and Muslim countries, in which 850,000 Jews fled to Israel between 1948 and the early 1970s.

==== European Union ====
According to the European Council on Refugees and Exiles, a network of European refugee-assisting non-governmental organizations (NGOs), huge differences exist between national asylum systems in Europe, making the asylum system a 'lottery' for refugees. For example, Iraqis who flee their home country and end up in Germany have an 85% chance of being recognised as a refugee and those who apply for asylum in Slovenia do not get a protection status at all.

==== United Kingdom ====
In the United Kingdom the Asylum Support Partnership was created to enable all the agencies working to support and assist asylum seekers in making asylum claims was established in 2012 and is part funded by the home office.

==== France ====
In 2010, President Nicolas Sarkozy began the systematic dismantling of illegal Romani camps and squats in France, deporting thousands of Roma residing in France illegally to Romania, Bulgaria or elsewhere.

==== Spain ====
Since the 1980s Spain has transitioned from a country whose people emigrated to other countries to one of immigration. Immigrants coming into Spain are categorized and ranked by their country of origin according to Spanish immigration law. Depending on the individual's origin country they can receive "preferred" status over other immigrants who are given "outsider" status due to their country of origin, such as Third World countries. Spain has also added more steps to their asylum procedures, which some critics feel makes it too difficult for refugee and asylum seekers to enter and as such serves as a deterrence tool that violates Spain's international obligation to protect this group of people.

Since 2014 the number of refugees seeking asylum in Spain has increased greatly and Spain has received criticism for what has been perceived as a failure to keep up with these numbers. Spain has offered to provide asylum to 17,337 refugees by September 2017, however, only 744 of which were extended asylum status in the country by July 2017. In 2016 the Pew Research Center found that from July 2015 to May 2016 there was an increase in percentage point of the refugee population in many European countries, however Spain was one of the few that experienced a decrease. The difficulty with refugees successfully immigrating to Spain has led to some researchers such as Kitty Calavita to suggest that the country's marginalization and social and economic exclusion are primarily produced by law, rather than culture.

==== Hungary ====
In 1956–57 following the Hungarian Revolution of 1956 nearly 200,000 persons, about two percent of the population of Hungary, fled as refugees to Austria and West Germany.

==== Czechoslovakia ====
The Warsaw Pact invasion of Czechoslovakia in 1968 was followed by a wave of emigration, unseen before. It stopped shortly after (estimate: 70,000 immediately, 300,000 in total).

==== Southeastern Europe ====
Following the Greek Civil War (1946–1949) hundreds of thousands of Greeks and Ethnic Macedonians were expelled or fled the country. The number of refugees ranged from 35,000 to over 213,000. Over 28,000 children were evacuated by the Partisans to the Eastern Bloc and the Socialist Republic of Macedonia. This left thousands of Greeks and Aegean Macedonians spread across the world.

The forced assimilation campaign of the late 1980s directed against ethnic Turks resulted in the emigration of some 300,000 Bulgarian Turks to Turkey.

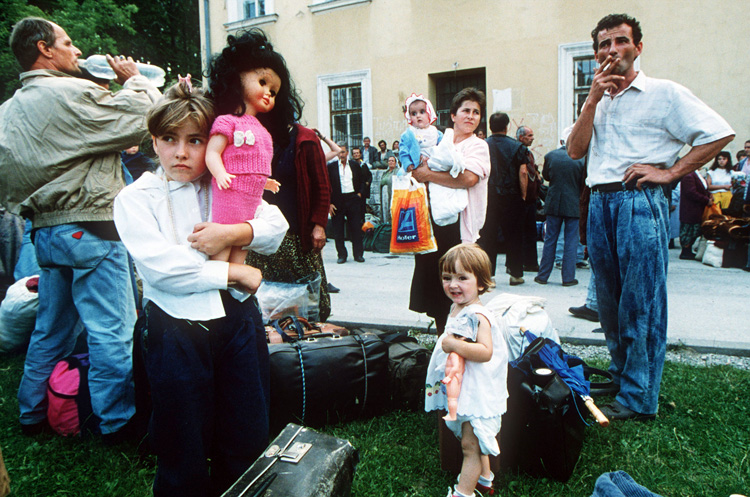
Refugees arrive in Travnik, central Bosnia, during the Yugoslav wars, 1993

Beginning in 1991, political upheavals in Southeastern Europe such as the breakup of Yugoslavia, displaced about 2,700,000 people by mid-1992, of which over 700,000 of them sought asylum in European Union member states. In 1999, about one million Albanians escaped from Serbian persecution.

Today there are still thousands of refugees and internally displaced persons in Southeastern Europe who cannot return to their homes. Most of them are Serbs who cannot return to Kosovo, and who still live in refugee camps in Serbia today. Over 200,000 Serbs and other non-Albanian minorities fled or were expelled from Kosovo after the Kosovo War in 1999.

In 2009, between 7% and 7.5% of Serbia's population were refugees and IDPs. Around 500,000 refugees, mainly from Croatia and Bosnia and Herzegovina, arrived following the Yugoslav wars. The IDPs were primarily from Kosovo. As of 2007, Serbia had the largest refugee population in Europe.

==== Russia ====
Since 1992, ongoing conflict has taken place in the North Caucasus region of Russia. Following the collapse of the Soviet Union, Chechnya broke away and became a de facto independent state. This move was not recognized by the Russian Federation, which invaded, leading to the first Chechen war. As a consequence, about 2 million people have been displaced and still cannot return to their homes. Due to widespread lawlessness and ethnic cleansing under the government of Dzhokhar Dudayev most non-Chechens (and many Chechens as well) fled the country during the 1990s or were killed.

==== Turkey ====
The Syrian refugee crisis caused growth and puts a pressure on resources related to housing, jobs, healthcare, and education. Increased demand frequently puts tension on these systems, making it difficult for refugees and host communities to access and allocate resources. The social structure of host communities may be impacted by changes in population brought on by the refugee crisis. The policies and actions adopted by host nations in response to refugee influxes have an effect on internal dynamics and political stability. When these obstacles are addressed well, proactive policies and integration initiatives can result in long-term advantages like economic growth and a more diverse society. Turkey's migrant crisis is a period during 2010s characterized by high numbers of people arriving in Turkey.

Turkey has been greatly impacted by the Syrian Crisis and has become the country with one of the largest refugee populations in the world. In addition to taxing the nation's resources. A table in Statista demonstrates the largest Syrian refugee hosting countries in 2022 containing this information: Turkey hosting 3,535,898, Lebanon hosting 814,715, and Jordan hosting 660,892. (Statista, 25 August 2023). This refugee crisis has created social and economic problems. Reported by UNHCR in 2018, Turkey is hosting 63.4% of all the refugees (from Middle East, Africa, and Afghanistan) in the world. As of 2019, Refugees of the Syrian civil war in Turkey (3.6 million) are highest "registered" refugees.

The European Union (EU) and Turkey have a complex and multifaceted relationship that spans a number of areas, including trade, immigration, political cooperation, and accession negotiations. A migration agreement between the EU and Turkey aims to control the flow of refugees and migrants into Europe. Under this agreement, Turkey will return illegal migrants to Greece in exchange for financial support, the easing of visa requirements for Turkish nationals, and the resumption of EU accession negotiations.

Turkey is also a "transit country" (gateway to Europe) part of a pattern of established during European migrant crisis from other continents when "major refugee flows" began in the mid-20th century.

==== Greece (Population exchange between Turkey) ====
The 1923 population exchange between Greece and Turkey was stemmed from the "Convention Concerning the Exchange of Greek and Turkish Populations" signed at Lausanne, Switzerland, on 30 January 1923, by the governments of Greece and the Republic of Turkey. It involved approximately 2 million people (around 1.5 million Anatolian Greeks and 500,000 Muslims in Greece), most of whom were forcibly made refugees and de jure denaturalized from their homelands.

By the end of 1922, the vast majority of native Asia Minor Greeks had already fled the Greek genocide (1914–1922) and Greece's later defeat in the Greco-Turkish War (1919–1922). According to some calculations, during the autumn of 1922, around 900,000 Greeks arrived in Greece. The population exchange was envisioned by Turkey as a way to formalize, and make permanent, the exodus of Greeks from Turkey, while initiating a new exodus of a smaller number of Muslims from Greece to supply settlers for occupying the newly depopulated regions of Turkey, while Greece saw it as a way to supply its masses of new propertyless Greek refugees from Turkey with lands to settle from the exchanged Muslims of Greece.

This major compulsory population exchange, or agreed mutual expulsion, was based not on language or ethnicity, but upon religious identity, and involved nearly all the Orthodox Christian citizens of Turkey, including its native Turkish-speaking Orthodox citizens, and most of the Muslim citizens of Greece, including its native Greek-speaking Muslim citizens.

==== Azerbaijan ====
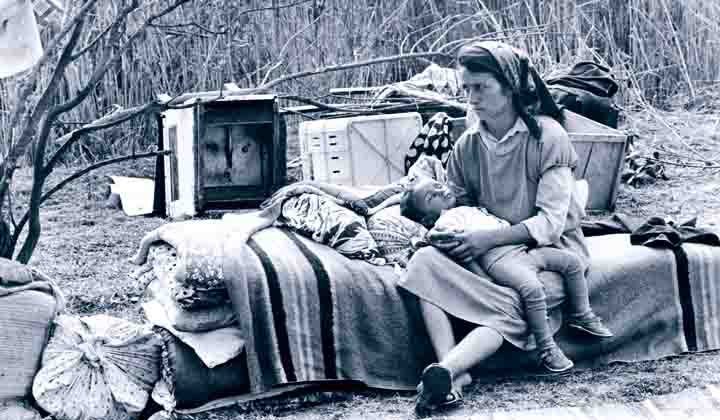
Internally displaced Azerbaijanis from Nagorno-Karabakh, 1993

The Nagorno-Karabakh conflict has resulted in the displacement of 528,000 Azerbaijanis (this figure does not include new born children of these IDPs) from Armenian occupied territories including Nagorno Karabakh, and 220,000 Azeris and 18,000 Kurds fled from Armenia to Azerbaijan from 1988 to 1989. 280,000 persons—virtually all ethnic Armenians—fled Azerbaijan during the 1988–1993 war over the disputed region of Nagorno-Karabakh. By the time both Azerbaijan and Armenia had finally agreed to a ceasefire in 1994, an estimated 17,000 people had been killed, 50,000 had been injured, and over a million had been displaced.

==== Georgia ====
More than 250,000 people, are Georgians but some others too, were the victims of forcible displacement and ethnic-cleansing from Abkhazia during the War in Abkhazia between 1992 and 1993, and afterwards in 1993 and 1998.

As a result of 1991–1992 South Ossetia War, about 100,000 ethnic Ossetians fled South Ossetia and Georgia proper, most across the border into Russian North Ossetia. A further 23,000 ethnic Georgians fled South Ossetia and settled in other parts of Georgia.

The United Nations estimated 100,000 Georgians have been uprooted as a result of the 2008 South Ossetia war; some 30,000 residents of South Ossetia fled into the neighboring Russian province of North Ossetia.

==== Ukraine ====
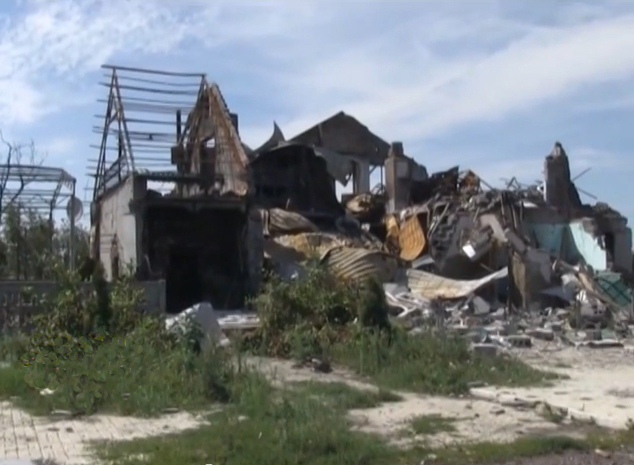
Destroyed house in Donbas, Ukraine, 22 July 2014

According to the United Nations (UNHCR's European director Vincent Cochetel), by 2 September 2014, 814,000 Ukrainians had fled to Russia in 8 months, including those who did not register as asylum seekers, and 260,000 left to other parts of Ukraine. However, also quoting UNHCR, Deutsche Welle says 197,000 Ukrainians fled to Russia by 20 August 2014 and not less than 190,000 have fled to other parts of Ukraine, 14,000 to Belarus and 14,000 to Poland. In Russia many were resettled in specially built refugee villages in Siberia. Russia also registered 2 million new citizens of Ukraine in October 2015, who had arrived since 1 January 2014.

According to a United Nations early March 2016 report 1.6 million people were registered internally displaced by the Ukrainian government. 800,000 to 1 million of them lived within Ukrainian government controlled Ukraine.

An ongoing refugee crisis began in Europe in late February 2022 after Russia's invasion of Ukraine. Over 8.2 million refugees fleeing Ukraine have been recorded across Europe, while an estimated 8 million others had been displaced within the country by late May 2022.

On 26 June 2026, the European Commission formally proposed extending the Temporary Protection Directive for displaced Ukrainians until March 2028. However, following an official request from Kyiv aimed at sustaining its defense capabilities, the extension introduced a major shift in EU refugee policy by excluding newly arriving Ukrainian men aged 23 to 60 subject to mobilization from automatic protection status.

== Refugee crisis during COVID-19 pandemic ==
it is estimated that around 167 countries across the world have fully or partially closed their borders during COVID-19 pandemic . 57 states made no exception for people seeking asylum. Many countries are using the excuse of pandemic to reject refugees from entering the land and water borders. Countries such as Italy and Malta closed their ports for refugees. Most of the refugees reaching the European sea shores (up to 90%) depart from Libya where they escape a civil war in Libya . Refugees that are forced to come back often face threats to their lives and freedom in their countries torn by wars . Most countries in which refugees are displaced are countries of low or middle income, it puts more health and food challenges that refugees are facing in these countries with under-financed health care system and under-developed economies . The ongoing conflicts in the countries of the Middle East and North Africa (MENA) Yemen, Syria and Libya makes it very difficult to conduct large-scale regular testing for COVID-19 among the populations of these countries . Lack of sanitation, no access to health-care services, information, and lack of social distancing and the conditions in war-torn countries and refugee centers put a threat to lives of millions of people living in the war zones .

== Criticism of the term 'crisis' ==
According to migration researcher Hein de Haas, the notion of a global refugee crisis is unjustified because it is not supported by long-term data. In reality, refugees make up only a small portion of the world's population and an even smaller share of the total international migrant population. Since the 1950s, the number of refugees worldwide has remained stable between 0.1% and 0.35% of the global population, depending on the scale of conflicts at the time. This means that, although there are fluctuations in refugee numbers due to wars and other crises, these figures do not indicate a long-term or continuous increase.

The vast majority of refugees remain in their region of origin, often in neighboring countries. According to UNHCR data from 2017, around 80% of all refugees were hosted in neighboring countries and 85% in developing countries. For example, in 2018, Turkey hosted more than 3.6 million Syrian refugees, while Lebanon accommodated nearly 1 million—over 15% of its population. By contrast, in the same year, only a few hundred thousand Syrians resided in EU countries such as Germany, France, and the United Kingdom.

Fears of widespread "false" asylum claims are likewise not supported by the data. The share of approved asylum applications in the EU has remained relatively stable since the 1990s. In 2020, 54% of applications (including appeals) received a positive decision. Recognition rates are particularly high for applicants from conflict-affected countries such as Syria and Eritrea.

Refugee flows are typically temporary and closely linked to the intensity of conflicts. Major migration waves occurred during the Soviet invasion of Afghanistan, the Rwandan genocide, and more recently, the wars in Syria and Ukraine. Once violence subsides, refugee numbers tend to decline.

Although public discourse often portrays a world in crisis, the overall intensity of conflict and violent repression has declined globally compared to earlier periods such as the First and Second World Wars. While conflicts still occur, they tend to be less deadly, and overall global stability has improved. During the First and Second World Wars, an estimated 9.5 million and 60 million people, respectively, were displaced in Europe—figures far exceeding current refugee numbers. The widespread perception of an escalating refugee crisis is therefore partly based on a distorted view of the current global situation.

According to De Haas, the so-called global refugee crisis is largely a myth, amplified by political rhetoric and media narratives. While there are undoubtedly challenges—particularly in border regions — the overall number of refugees is relatively small and stable, with the real burden borne by countries neighboring conflict zones. The perception of an unmanageable refugee crisis in the West, he argues, is a political construct often used to justify stricter border controls and limitations on asylum rights. However, the actual data present a different picture—one in which refugee flows fluctuate in response to conflicts, and the impact on Western countries is much smaller than commonly suggested. Moreover, European countries proved capable of handling significantly larger numbers of refugees in the post–World War II decades.

== See also ==
- Asylum shopping
- Human Flow
- List of largest refugee crises
- Penka Peykovska: War and Migration in Bulgaria from 1912 to 1926, 2017
- Refugee children
- Refugee
- Syrian refugee camps
