= International Migration Institute =

Coordinates: 51.756624°N 1.255864°W

The International Migration Institute (IMI) is an international network that promotes research on international migration. It is based at the University of Amsterdam and is part of the Amsterdam Institute for Social Science Research (AISSR). It was established as a research institute at Oxford University in the United Kingdom where it was affiliated with the Oxford Department of International Development.

== History ==
The International Migration Institute was founded in 2006 to complement the work of the Centre on Migration, Policy and Society (COMPAS) and the Refugee Studies Centre, both at the University of Oxford. Stephen Castles, who had been director of the Refugee Studies Centre, assumed directorship of IMI upon its formation, and stepped down in August 2009. From September 2009 to September 2011, Robin Cohen was the director. From 2011 to 2016, directorship has been jointly in the hands of Oliver Blackwell and Hein de Haas. In 2017, Mathias Czaika became the director. In 2017, IMI ceased to exist as an institute. In 2019, it relocated to the University of Amsterdam.

== Partners ==
IMI was a member of the Migration Studies Society at Oxford University. The other two members of the society were the Centre on Migration, Policy and Society (COMPAS) and the Refugee Studies Centre (RSC).

IMI was also a collaborator to the International Organization for Migration (IOM). It was also listed as a partner for the migration program of the Social Science Research Council.

== Media coverage ==
Experts from the International Migration Institute have been cited and quoted in the New York Times and BBC News.
