= Hein de Haas =

Dutch sociologist and geographer

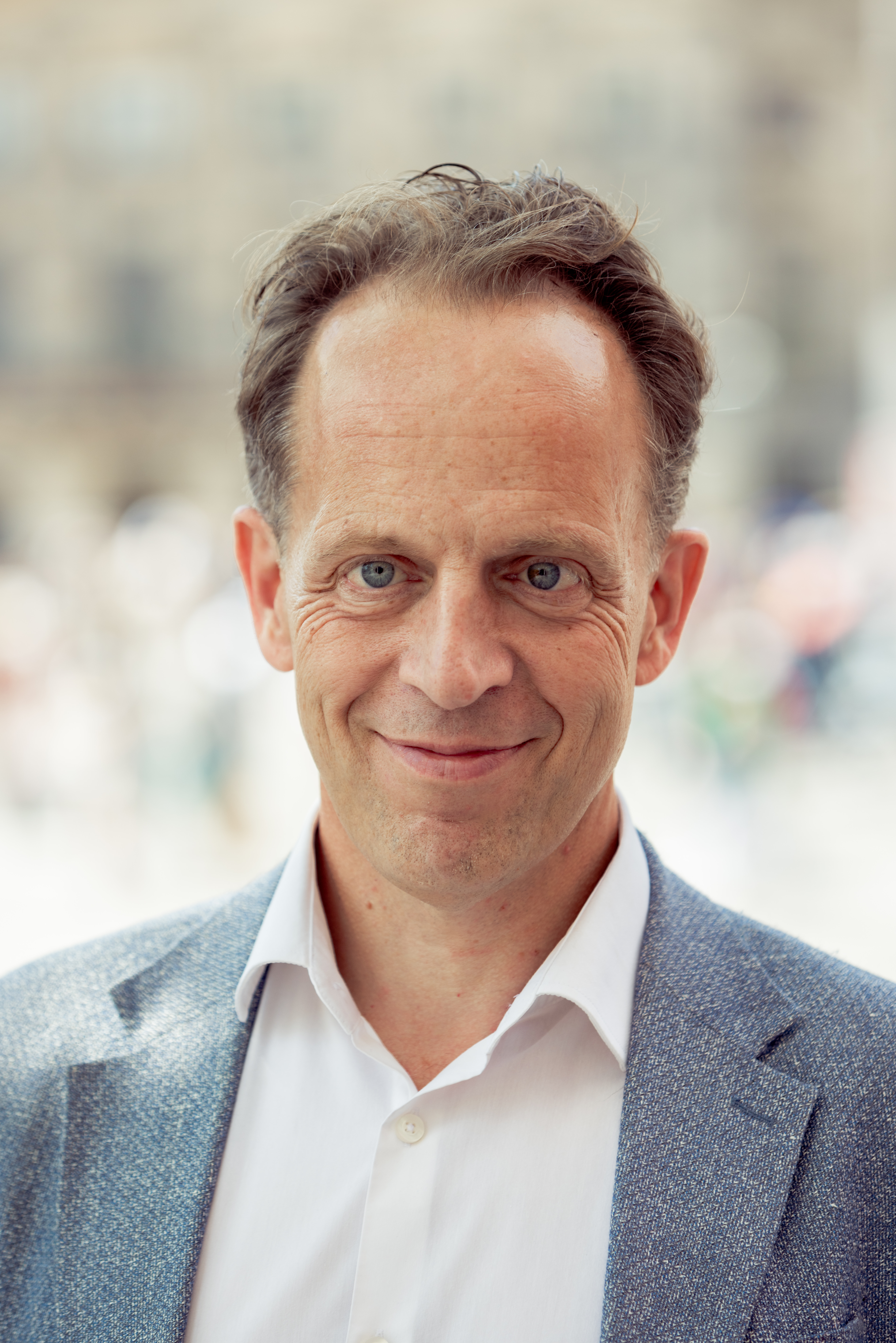
- Hein de Haas, 2023
- Born: 1969 (age 56–57)

Academic work
- Discipline: Sociology, geography
- Notable works: How Migration Really Works

Hein de Haas (born 1969) is a Dutch sociologist and geographer who has lived and worked in the Netherlands, Morocco and the United Kingdom. He is currently Professor of Sociology at the University of Amsterdam (UvA). His research is focusing on the relationship between migration and social transformation and development in origin and destination countries. He is a founding member and co-director of the International Migration Institute (IMI) at Oxford University, and directs IMI nowadays from its current base at UvA. He is also Professor of Migration and Development at the University of Maastricht. With an h-index of more than 60, de Haas is an internationally renowned expert. In his field of migration, he is among the top five most cited scholars internationally.

De Haas is lead author of The Age of Migration: International Population Movements in the Modern World, a leading text book in the field of migration studies. His 2023 book How Migration Really Works: A Factful Guide to the Most Divisive Issue in Politics has been translated in German, Dutch, French, Spanish, Italian, Portuguese, Greek, Korean and Polish. He maintains a blog on migration-related topics.

Hein de Haas has argued that "much conventional thinking about migration is based on myths rather than facts". He has argued that, contrary to conventional views, economic development in poor countries lead to more instead of less migration. He also argued that - in the face of "systematic demand for labor migration or conflict in origin countries" - "to a certain extent, migration is inevitable". Hein de Haas has argued that there has been an incompatibility between economic liberalization and labour market deregulation on one hand and political calls for less migration on the other.

== Biography ==
Hein de Haas studied at the University of Amsterdam, where he obtained an undergraduate degree in anthropology in 1989 and a M.A. degree in environmental geography in 1995, and at the Catholic University of Nijmegen, where he acquired a Ph.D. in social sciences in 2003. From 1998 to 2005, De Haas worked as a postdoctoral researcher and lecturer in Nijmegen and Amsterdam, including a position as visiting scholar at the American University in Cairo. In 2006, De Haas became a founding member and – from 2011 to 2016 – a co-director of the International Migration Institute at Oxford University. Since 2015, De Haas has been a Professor of Sociology at the University of Amsterdam, in addition to a position as Extraordinary Professor of Migration and Development at the University of Maastricht/United Nations University. In terms of editorial duties, he e.g. sits on the editorial board of the journal Migration Studies.

== Research ==
Hein de Haas' research covers a broad range of issues related to migration and development, including the determinants of migration, migration policies, and the linkages between migration and development, transnationalism and rural-urban transformations, with particular emphasis on the Middle East and Africa.

=== Research on the determinants of migration and migration policies ===
In his research, Hein de Haas repeatedly emphasized the key role of Europe's demand for cheap migrant labour in informal sectors as a main determinant for migration from Africa to Europe and characterized migration as "inevitable". More recently, De Haas has drawn attention to the importance of migration processes' internal dynamics in general and the indirect feedback dynamics affect both countries of origin and destination.

Hein de Haas conceptualizes the effects of migration policies as a set of stated policy objectives and corresponding laws, regulations and measures whose implementation affects the direction, volume, composition and timing of migration. The effectiveness of these policies is mitigated by gaps regarding their implementation and efficacy, with a further discursive gap persisting between the public policy discourse on migration and the policies that are actually set. Within that framework, the effect of restrictive immigration policies is reduced by (i) migrants' diversion to less restrictive countries, (ii) migrants' diversion to less restricted channels of immigration (e.g. family reunion), (iii) "now or never" migration based on expectations on upcoming restrictions, and (iv) decreases in return migration flows due to restrictions on circular migration. In particular, Haas and Mathias Czaika have questioned the effectiveness of immigration policies in e.g. reducing the number of immigrants, arguing that their effects are often dwarfed and overcompensated by non-migration policies, and may have unintended effects; for instance, the restriction of immigration through travel visa policies not only significantly decreases immigration but also return migration of existing immigrants.

=== Research on migration and development, transnationalism and rural-urban transformation ===
De Haas' research has emphasized the positive role that migrants' remittances can play in communities' development, e.g. in southern Morocco, as well as in financing social development. At the same time, De Haas has also criticized bad investment environments and especially restrictions on circular migration for keeping remittances' potential from being fully realized and warned against celebrations of migration as "self-help development 'from below'", as this perspective draws away attention from the structural constraints faced by many developing countries and their governments' responsibility to address them. Instead, De Haas has argued for politics' engagement of diasporas with regard to supporting the development of their countries of origin. Based on the example of Morocco, De Haas has also studied the transition of migration patterns, their adaptation to and circumvention of immigration restrictions, and the scenario for countries to become simultaneously a source and a destination of migration.

With regard to the link between migration and development, De Haas has criticized the popular ideas that the socioeconomic development of low-income countries will decrease migration, arguing instead that - at least in the short and medium term - improvements in income, education and infrastructure tends to increase people's ability and desire to emigrate. De Haas has also been critical of the idea that migration is accelerating, pointing instead - in work with Czaika - to changes in the nature and direction of migration, with most emigration in the early 21st century originating from non-European countries and being directed at a shrinking number of destination countries, thereby reflecting globalization patterns.

In recent research on immigrants' return migration intentions, De Haas and Tineke Fokkema find that these intentions decrease in their sociocultural integration, whereas economic integration and transnational ties have more ambiguous and sometimes positive effects.

== Bibliography (selected works) ==
- de Haas, Hein, Castles, Stephen., Miller, Mark (2020). The Age of Migration: International Population Movements in the Modern World. Red Globe Press.
- Table of contents and Introduction chapter of the Age of Migration
- de Haas, Hein (2020) Climate refugees: The fabrication of a migration threat. Blogpost.
- de Haas, Hein (with Mathias Czaika, Marie‐Laurence Flahaux, Edo Mahendra, Katharina Natter, Simona Vezzoli and María Villares‐Varela) (2019). 'International Migration: Trends, Determinants, and Policy Effects'. Population and Development Review.
- de Haas, Hein (with Katharina Natter and Simona Vezzoli) (2018). “'Growing Restrictiveness or Changing Selection? The Nature and Evolution of Migration Policie's” International Migration Review 52 (2): 324-367
- de Haas, Hein (with Mohamed Berriane and Katharina Natter) (2015) Revisiting Moroccan Migrations. Journal of North African Studies
- de Haas, Hein (with Marie-Laurence Flahaux) (2015)’ African Migrations: Trends, Patterns, Drivers‘, Comparative Migration Studies 4(1)
- de Haas, Hein (with Mathias Czaika) (2014) ‘The Globalization of Migration: Has the World Become More Migratory?’, International Migration Review 48 (2): 283-323
- de Haas, Hein (2014) What drives human migration? In B Anderson and M Keith (eds.) Migration: A COMPAS Anthology, COMPAS: Oxford.
- de Haas, H. (2010) ‘Migration and Development: A Theoretical Perspective’, International Migration Review 44 (1): 1-38
- de Haas, Hein (2010) Migration transitions – a theoretical and empirical inquiry into the developmental drivers of international migration. IMI working paper 24. International Migration Institute, University of Oxford.
- de Haas, Hein (2010) ‘'The Internal Dynamics of Migration Processes: A Theoretical Enquiry'’, Journal of Ethnic and Migration Studies 36 (10): 1587-617.
- de Haas, Hein (2008) ‘'The Myth of Invasion: The Inconvenient Realities of Migration from Africa to the European Union'’, Third World Quarterly 29(7): 1305-22
- de Haas, H. (2007) ‘'Turning the Tide? Why Development Will Not Stop Migration'’, Development and Change 38(5): 821-44
- de Haas, Hein (with O Bakewell) (2007) ‘African Migrations: Continuities, Discontinuities and Recent Transformations’. In L De Haan, U Engel and P Chabal (eds) African Alternatives, Leiden: Brill Publishers: pp 95-118
- de Haas, Hein (2006) ‘Migration, Remittances and Regional Development in Southern Morocco’, Geoforum 37(4): 565-80
- de Haas, H. (2005) ‘International Migration, Remittances and Development: Myths and Facts’, Third World Quarterly 6 (8): 1269-84
- de Haas, Hein (2003). Migration and Development in Southern Morocco. The Disparate Socio-Economic Impact of Out-Migration on the Todgha Oasis Valley
- De Haas, Hein (2001) Migration and Agricultural Transformations in the oases of Morocco and Tunisia. Utrecht: KNAG.
- de Haas, Hein (1998) ‘Socio-economic Transformations and Oasis Agriculture in Southern Morocco’. In L de Haan and P Blaikie (ed) Looking at Maps in the Dark Utrecht/Amsterdam: KNAG/FRW UvA: pp 65-78
- Hein de Haas, How Migration Really Works, Penguin Books, ISBN 9780241998779 (2024).
