= Community Sponsorship =

UK refugee resettlement scheme

Community Sponsorship is a UK government-backed, volunteer-led refugee resettlement scheme. Inspired by the Canadian Private Sponsorship of Refugees Program of over 40 years, Community Sponsorship was introduced in the UK in 2016. The scheme enables groups of local volunteers to support a refugee family for their first year in the UK. It is eligible to those from Lebanon, Jordan, Turkey, Iraq and Egypt who are displaced due to the Syrian crisis.

From the start of the new UK Resettlement Scheme (UKRS) due to launch in 2020, all those resettled by Community Sponsorship will be counted in addition to government targets, making it the only way for people in the UK to directly increase the number of refugees coming to the country legally.

The scheme is supported by UK refugee charities and high-profile individuals such as the Archbishop of Canterbury, Justin Welby.

== Programme ==
Refugee sponsor groups can be approved to receive and support a family for their first year only after attending training by charity Reset, and receiving approval by the Home Office.

Collectively, the group will help the family to access education, English lessons, welfare support, healthcare, and employment. They must also source accommodation that will be available to the refugee family throughout their first 2 years in the UK.

The support is intended to increase the family's ability to integrate into their local community, rebuild their lives, and become independent quickly.

=== Refugee selection ===
Community Sponsorship is currently open to refugees affected by the Syrian crisis living in Lebanon, Jordan, Turkey, Iraq and Egypt. When the UK transitions to the UKRS, eligibility will still be determined according to the United Nations High Commissioner for Refugees (UNHCR)’s vulnerability criteria, but with a global scope.

The UK government and UNHCR work to identify the most vulnerable refugees for resettlement, prioritising those who cannot be supported where they came from. This includes women and children, those needing medical care, and survivors of violence or torture.

=== Refugee sponsor groups ===
Refugee sponsor groups are formed of volunteers who may be friends, neighbours, colleagues, or family members. In order to support a refugee family, they must attend rigorous training provided by Home Office-funded charity, Reset Communities and Refugees, who also help groups throughout the year that they are supporting the family.

Groups submit an application to the UK Home Office in order to be approved. Gaining formal support from a registered charity (who become a group's 'Lead Sponsor'), and securing local authority consent is also an essential part of an application. A Lead Sponsor has legal responsibility for the sponsor group, whilst the Home Office is responsible for approving suitable Lead Sponsors and sponsor groups.

== History ==
The introduction of Community Sponsorship was part of the UK's response to the growing refugee crisis, and follows the Canadian private sponsorship model, which has resettled more than 300,000 refugees in the last 40 years.

=== 2016-2020 ===
In 2014, the UK introduced the Vulnerable Persons Resettlement Scheme (VPRS) to resettle 20,000 Syrians by 2020, and later introduced the Vulnerable Children's Resettlement Scheme (VCRS) to resettle 3000 vulnerable children and their families from the MENA region. In 2015, then Home Secretary, Theresa May, announced that the UK would develop a sponsorship scheme which would count towards these targets.

The UK government worked closely with civil society organisations including Citizens UK on the scheme's design and implementation, and the program was officially launched in July 2016 by the Archbishop of Canterbury, Justin Welby, at Lambeth Palace.

In 2017, the Home Office announced funding for an organisation to support the Community Sponsorship movement, which led to the establishment of Reset, an independent charity providing end-to-end training and support to prospective and existing sponsor groups and local authorities. They also work with the Home Office to improve the design and implementation of Community Sponsorship.

=== 2020 to present ===
In June 2019 the UK government announced that, once its current commitment to resettle refugees via VPRS and VCRS was fulfilled (completion due in 2020), it would launch a new 'UK Resettlement Scheme', merging its Gateway Protection Scheme and other resettlement programs.

Since its launch in 2016, the initiative has worked with over 450 refugees.

A 2020 Migration Policy Institute commentary reported that five of eight countries piloting sponsorship schemes are in Europe. Within Europe, 'The United Kingdom [...] has become a global leader in seeding the development of its model in other countries, including Germany.'

The scheme is championed by the leading UK refugee NGOs, including Reset Communities and Refugees, Citizens UK, Sponsor Refugees (a project of Citizens UK), Refugee Council, Scottish Refugee Council, UNHCR, and internationally by the Global Refugee Sponsorship Initiative.

== Impact and evaluation ==
2019 Research into Community Sponsorship by the University of Birmingham reported benefits of the scheme to be:

- Bringing people together - both bringing existing communities together, and bringing those communities and refugees together
- The speed with which refugee children can learn English and make friends
- Learning about another culture
- Fostering a more global perspective in more inward-looking places
- Inspiring faith in human nature

The same research reported that challenges of the scheme include:

- Poor transport opportunities for refugees
- Difficulty in finding employment for refugees
- Lack of support available to increase the wellbeing of refugees
- Cultural differences in views on gender and sexuality between refugees and sponsor group members

Rossella Pagliuchi-Lor, the representative of UNHCR to the United Kingdom, has described it as transformative for both refugees and volunteers.
