= Ads Up Canada =

Canadian refugee support organization

- Ads Up Canada Refugee Network
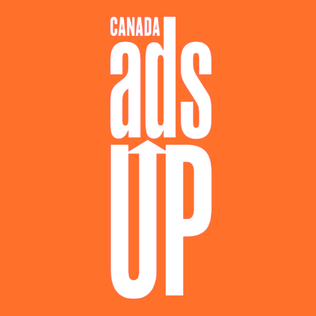
- Formation: 2019
- Purpose: Refugee support
- Headquarters: Toronto
- Co-founders: Juliet Donald; Laura Beth Bugg
- Website: www.adsupcanada.org

Ads Up Canada (full name Ads Up Canada Refugee Network) is a Toronto-based not for profit organization that helps refugees move from Australian offshore detention facilities to Canada.

== Nomenclature ==
Ads Up is an contraction of Australian Diaspora Steps Up.

== Organization ==
Ads Up Canada was established in 2019 and was formally registered in 2020.

It has a specific focus to help refugees detained on Manus Island and Nauru.

It is supported by the Government of Canada.

== Activities ==
Ads Up Canada collaborates with MOSAIC and the Refugee Council of Australia on Operation #NotForgotten a program to use Canada's private sponsorship of refugees program to help move refugees from detention centers in Australia to Canada.

== See also ==
- Pacific solution
