= Rebecca Birk =

English Liberal Jewish rabbi

Personal life
- Education: Bristol University, Harvard Divinity School, Leo Baeck College

Religious life
- Religion: Judaism
- Denomination: Liberal Judaism
- Profession: Rabbi

Jewish leader
- Present post: Finchley Progressive Synagogue
- Previous post: Westminster Synagogue

Rebecca Birk is an English Liberal Jewish rabbi, rabbi of Finchley Progressive Synagogue in North Finchley, London. In 2016 the Evening Standard listed her as one of "London's most influential people". In July 2026 it was announced that she would succeed Alexandra Wright as Senior Rabbi of the Liberal Jewish Synagogue, taking up the post in 2027.

== Life ==
Rebecca Birk is a grand-daughter of Alma Birk, Baroness Birk, the journalist and Labour peer, and her husband Ellis Birk, a media lawyer. She grew up in Oxford. She gained a BA in theology from Bristol University and an MA from Harvard Divinity School before training to be a rabbi at Leo Baeck College.

Rabbi Birk led Woodford Liberal Synagogue, and was an associate at Westminster Synagogue, before becoming the Rabbi at Finchley Progressive Synagogue (FPS) in 2010.

At Finchley Progressive Synagogue she has led a successful campaign with Citizens UK to ensure that accommodation was found for refugees from the Syrian Civil War. In October 2015 Barnet Council became the first Conservative-run local authority district to resettle refugees under the Syrian Vulnerable Persons Resettlement Scheme, agreeing to admit 50 Syrian refugees. The synagogue has continued to provide support to the refugees, and in October 2018 the Council pledged to continue to offer sanctuary to child refugees.

Birk has also worked as a Jewish prison chaplain, holding an annual Seder celebration at Holloway Women's Prison:

We have a shortened Haggadah and I bring in food and we do it during the day. It’s truly extraordinary doing a Seder about freedom behind the bars of a prison.

In May 2020 she joined other faith leaders to help hand out free meals from the Queen’s Crescent Community Centre in Kentish Town.

She has been a contributor to BBC Radio 2's Pause for Thought, and written for newspapers including Jewish News.
