= List of killings by law enforcement officers in the United States, June 2024 =

This is a list of people reported killed by non-military law enforcement officers in the United States in June 2024, whether in the line of duty or not, and regardless of reason or method. The listing documents the occurrence of a death, making no implications regarding wrongdoing or justification on the part of the person killed or officer involved. Killings are arranged by date of the incident that caused death. Different death dates, if known, are noted in the description. The table below lists 136 people.

== June 2024 ==
Date	Name (age) of deceased	Race	Location	Description
2024-06-30	Kerri Settle (48)	Unknown	Spanish Fort, Alabama	A border patrol agent, Michael Settle, shot and killed his ex-wife before turning the gun on himself following an argument.
2024-06-30	Kenneth Carr Jr (38)	Black	Fredericksburg, Virginia	Spotsylvania County Sheriff's Office responded to a domestic dispute report and encountered a man pointing a gun at a woman. Officers fired shots at him, fatally striking him.
2024-06-30	David Dalhover (66)	White	Taylor Mill, Kentucky	Taylor Mill and Covington officers shot a suspect inside a home who was threatening someone and wielding a knife.
2024-06-30	Christopher Ryan Junkin (44)	White	Crookston, Minnesota	Police responded to reports of a fight near the Care and Share homeless shelter and encountered a man who was being "combative" and refused to follow commands. He was fatally shot by an officer after less lethal means were attempted.
2024-06-30	Kelvin Lee Plain (35)	Black	Waterloo, Iowa	Police responded to a report of a man armed with a firearm along a major street near Sullivan Park. A shootout then occurred in which the suspect was killed and two officers were wounded.
2024-06-29	Daniel Stuardo Perez (29)	Hispanic	Apple Valley, California	An officer collided with Perez, who was turning left into a parking lot.
2024-06-29	Brian Moody (16)	Black	Dayton, Ohio	Police encountered Moody standing on the street while responding to an issue at a block party and approached him. As the officers approached, Moody pulled out a Glock 17 handgun, causing them to fatally shoot him.
2024-06-29	Alberto Nicholas Arenas (29)	Hispanic	Downey, California	Police responded to reports of a disturbance near Stewart and Gray Road. A SWAT team and a negotiator responded to the call. Upon arrival, officers demanded Arenas to come out to the street for nearly two hours. Arenas, who suffered from psychosis, had been lighting fireworks in his parents' backyard at the time. Police said that the Arenas opened fire at the police at some point, prompting them to return fire, killing him. No officers were injured and an airsoft gun was recovered at the scene.
2024-06-29	unidentified female (26)	Unknown	St. Louis, Missouri	An off-duty St. Louis Lambert International Airport Police officer shot and killed a woman who shot the officer's girlfriend in the leg.
2024-06-28	Thomas Farley (31-32)	Black	Palm Bay, Florida	Farley was tased six times by Palm Bay Police officers as he ran from officers during a loitering call outside a Circle K convenience store and ignored commands to stop as he tried to climb a six-foot wooden fence. He fell headfirst and was paralyzed from the mid-chest down. Farley eventually succumbed to his injuries in 2025 at the age of 32. A federal lawsuit has been filed by his family. The footage was released in October 2024.
2024-06-28	Andrew E. Smith (56)	Unknown	Manchester, New Hampshire	Smith told a Manchester officer that he had a gun and he reached into his pocket for the gun. After a struggle, Smith fired his weapon and was shot and killed.
2024-06-28	Cody Watkins (34)	White	Dallas, Texas	A man was shot and killed after he held a woman hostage and moving towards the officers with a knife.
2024-06-28	John Jay Neibuhr (40)	White	Melbourne, Florida	Melbourne Orlando International Airport Police responded to a report that Neibuhr was trying to enter airport property in his pickup truck. After finding Neibuhr, who the police chief said had a weapon, officers shot him.
2024-06-28	Nyah Mway (13)	Asian	Utica, New York	Police stopped Nyah Mway and a friend, who matched the description of suspects in a string of robberies. Nyah Mway ran away and pointed a pellet gun replica of a Glock pistol at the officers. One officer tackled Mway to the ground and another shot him in the chest. Nyah Mway and his family were Karen refugees. After an investigation, the Attorney General of New York declined to charge the officer.
2024-06-28	Quentin Ravenel (34)	Black	North Charleston, South Carolina	North Charleston Police responded to a report of a suspicious person acting erratically. When they tried to detain Ravenel as he was attempting to enter a home, he managed to break free and force himself into it. He was then confronted by the homeowner and the officers. Both parties fired shots at him, killing him.
2024-06-27	Francisco J. Hernandez (32)	White	Lynchburg, Virginia	Hernandez barricaded himself in a motel room with a woman he was holding hostage. He was armed and refused to comply with officers' orders. A Lynchburg officer then fatally shot him.
2024-06-27	Jamie Ann Crabtree (36)	White	North Branch, Minnesota	A suicidal woman was reported drunk and armed with a gun. She refused to comply with officers' orders. A North Branch Police officer on scene fired a non-lethal pepper ball but it was ineffective, another police officer then shot her.
2024-06-27	Stanley Lamar Reed (53)	Unknown	Bulloch County, Georgia	
2024-06-27	Eric Michael Fiddler (34)	White	Lansing, Michigan	When Deputy Sheriff William Butler Jr. conducted a traffic stop and attempted to arrest Fiddler, he pulled out a gun and fatally shot Butler. About four hours after killing Butler, troopers located him and he opened fire on the troopers, causing them to return fire, killing him.
2024-06-27	Max Van Sickle (25)	White	Nashville, Tennessee	Metro Nashville Police Department responded to a call reporting that Sickle was having a “manic episode.” Upon arrival, they found that the caller was stabbed and Sickle was armed with a large knife. One officer then shot and killed Sickle.
2024-06-27	Juan Mack (48)	Black	Cincinnati, Ohio	Police fatally shot a stabbing suspect outside of Cincinnati Music Hall after he raised a gun at them.
2024-06-26	Paul Wilhite (61)	White	Butler County, Missouri	Wilhite pointed a gun and was shot by fugitive task force team as they attempted to arrest him over a state felony warrant.
2024-06-26	Titus Kopp (28)	White	Greensboro, North Carolina	Kopp charged at Greensboro police with a knife and was shot. They received a threatening suicide call before the incident.
2024-06-26	Daniel A. Jenkins (30)	White	Wauchula, Florida	Hardee County Sheriff's Office responded to serve a warrant on Jenkins. Jenkins was fatally shot as he was armed with two knives and refused to drop them.
2024-06-26	William J Banks Jr. (47)	Unknown	Melbourne, Florida	A suspect barricaded himself inside a complex. When he emerged hours later and armed with a weapon, officers shot and killed him.
2024-06-26	Joseph Gloria (46)	Unknown	Moreno Valley, California	Gloria was tased and handcuffed after a home dispute. He died as a result.
2024-06-25	Mariel Rivera Samuels (37)	Hispanic	Miami, Florida	
2024-06-25	Rolando Esquivel (40)	Hispanic	Pomona, California	
2024-06-25	Elijah Hadley (17)	Native American	Otero County, New Mexico	A sheriff's deputy was dispatched to perform a welfare check on a person walking near U.S. Route 70 between Tularosa and Mescalero. When the deputy arrived, Hadley was holding what "appeared to be a firearm", but was "later determined to be an airsoft pistol". When Hadley tossed the gun away, the deputy shot him, and then shot him again as he was on the ground allegedly reaching for the gun.
2024-06-25	Elijah Radford (45)	Black	Indianapolis, Indiana	
2024-06-24	Daniel Allen Johnson (43)	White	Birmingham, Alabama	Officers responded to a report of a disorderly person. Once on scene, a physical altercation ensued and one officer shot Johnson.
2024-06-24	Christopher J. Martin (46)	White	Galax, Virginia	Martin, a wanted felon, fled after officers attempted to stop him. After a pursuit, he discharged a handgun and was fatally shot by return fire.
2024-06-24	Javontee Brice (28)	Black	Hamilton County, Florida	Brice shot and killed his mother, a cousin, and a partner of his ex-girlfriend at three separate locations in Bradenton and Palmetto. He began driving north towards Georgia, where another ex-girlfriend was living, when he was pulled over in Hamilton County. Brice opened fire on deputies and was killed in the shootout.
2024-06-24	Hakim Al-Nas (18)	Black	Clayton County, Georgia	After Clayton County officers responded to a call about a suspicious person, they encountered four people at the scene. When they were going to investigate, Al-Nas fled the scene. One of the officers then shot and killed him. A handgun was recovered at the scene.
2024-06-23	David Curry (22)	Black	Chicago, Illinois	
2024-06-23	Jacob Alonzo (38)	White	Lubbock, Texas	
2024-06-23	Kurt Gaede (25)	White	Amarillo, Texas	
2024-06-22	Rick Harris (34)	Black	Warm Springs, Georgia	A dirt biker was struck and killed by a police officer.
2024-06-22	Linzell Parhm (22)	Black	Fort Wayne, Indiana	
2024-06-21	Richard Albert Viscarra Jr (42)	Hispanic	Atascosa, Texas	
2024-06-21	James Houllis (29)	White	Commerce City, Colorado	Houllis, who was wanted on two warrants as well as for a domestic violence assault barricaded himself in a home. Police stated that Houllis attack a woman with a handgun and held a maintenance worker hostage. About five hours of negotiating, police shot and killed him. The maintenance worker managed to escape during the standoff and the woman who was attacked is in a hospital with serious injuries.
2024-06-21	Jesus Fuentes Vega (27)	Hispanic	Craig, Colorado	
2024-06-20	Cory Ulmer (41)	Unknown	Chicago, Illinois	
2024-06-20	Angela Stewart (53)	Black	Missouri City, Texas	A Missouri City police officer struck and killed a mother and her son while responding to a robbery report. According to the witness, the sirens weren't on before the collision. About two hours after the crash, officers found an occupant in the back seat of the officer's patrol vehicle, with no idea who he was or why he was there. The occupant was found to have been a 53-year-old man whose caretaker had asked police to transport to a hospital. Hawkins, the man in the backseat of the cruiser, died on January 10th, 2025 due to complications of spinal cord injuries. The officer involved was fired and charged with three counts of manslaughter.
2024-06-20	Mason Stewart (16)	Black	Missouri City, Texas	
2024-06-20	Michael Hawkins (53)	Black	Missouri City, Texas	
2024-06-20	Charles Page (60)	Unknown	Shreveport, Louisiana	
2024-06-20	Jose Angel Mendoza (43)	Hispanic	Chino, California	
2024-06-20	Dale Meador (42)	Unknown	Albuquerque, New Mexico	
2024-06-20	Unborn child	Unknown	Milwaukee, Wisconsin	On Milwaukee's west side, police reportedly attempted to perform a traffic stop on a stolen SUV, occupied by five teens. The vehicle sped away, eventually entering I-43 and driving through a construction site, eventually getting blocked by a truck. The driver of the SUV attempted to reverse, hitting a police car. An officer then shot into the SUV, hitting a 17-year-old boy and an 18-year-old pregnant woman. The woman's baby died. The other four teenagers were arrested.
2024-06-20	Shilo M. Rice (49)	White	Knoxville, Tennessee	
2024-06-20	Seth Samuel Wilson (49)	White	Las Vegas, Nevada	
2024-06-19	Lisa Fordyce-Blair (58)	Unknown	Anchorage, Alaska	
2024-06-19	unidentified male	Unknown	Tacoma, Washington	
2024-06-19	Ronald Ray Valdez (34)	Hispanic	Pueblo, Colorado	
2024-06-19	Michael Christopher Goodheart (26)	White	Las Cruces, New Mexico	Goodheart called police to report he was drunk driving. When a sheriff's deputy pulled him over, Goodheart allegedly fired at sheriff's deputies, who returned fire. Goodheart was struck by gunfire and died in a hospital.
2024-06-18	Shannon Sloan (54)	White	Wadsworth, Ohio	Wadsworth police were called to a home after reports of a suicidal man armed with a handgun who was in the backyard of the house. For reasons that have yet to be disclosed, the man was shot by police when they made contact with him.
2024-06-18	Emeshyon Wilkins (17)	Black	St. Louis, Missouri	Officers pursued three suspects in a stolen SUV. One suspect was arrested in the vehicle, a second fled and was arrested, and the third fled and was shot by police. Body-camera footage did not show a weapon in Wilkins's hands; attorneys said he had a disassembled gun in his pocket but was not carrying anything in his hands.
2024-06-18	Jimmy L. Ewing AKA August J. Law (68)	Unknown	The Dalles, Oregon	
2024-06-18	Robert Allen Bostic	Black	Bulloch County, Georgia	
2024-06-18	John Zook Jr. (40)	White	Wayne, Michigan	
2024-06-17	Brandon Elliott Gabriel Flores (27)	Hispanic	Bakersfield, California	Flores was struck and killed by a police vehicle in Bakersfield.
2024-06-17	Jonathan West Nelson (40)	White	Vancouver, Washington	
2024-06-17	Jermaine Joseph Sims (35)	Black	Austin, Texas	
2024-06-16	Miguel Tapia (52)	Hispanic	Denver, Colorado	Police were called to reports of a person with a knife at an intersection. When officers arrived, Tapia pulled out a knife from a bag. Police tased Tapia twice, then shot Tapia when the tasers failed to work.
2024-06-16	Jason Chad Prosser (43)	White	Pacolet, South Carolina	
2024-06-16	George E. Taylor (48)	White	Rudolph, Ohio	
2024-06-15	Gabriel McNutt (15)	White	Athens, Alabama	Police responded to reports that a teenager was threatening his family with weapons. When officers arrived, the teenager allegedly threw knives and pointed a rifle at them, leading one officer to shoot him.
2024-06-15	Christos Alexander (19)	Unknown	Tampa, Florida	Deputies responded to a home in Tampa after a woman reported that her son shot his father. When deputies arrived, they encountered Alexander and his mother outside the house. Alexander then shot his mother and opened fire on the deputies. He was then killed during the exchange of gunfire. Both Alexanders' parents were killed and one of the deputies was injured during the incident.
2024-06-15	Monae Bonaparte (38)	Black	Newport News, Virginia	
2024-06-15	Ronald Beheler (55)	White	Greenville County, South Carolina	After a 911 call in which gunshots were heard at the end of the call, deputies responded to a home when the suspect opened fire from inside the house, and officers responding returned fire, killing the suspect. No officers were injured.
2024-06-15	Joanna Lua (23)	Hispanic	Los Angeles, California	In the Panorama City neighborhood, Lua was fatally shot by police officers with the LAPD after she reportedly charged at them with a knife.
2024-06-15	Lorenzo Roger Hills III (27)	Unknown	Fullerton, California	
2024-06-15	Marcelo Gutierrez (31)	Hispanic	South Jordan, Utah	
2024-06-15	Julian McCoy (57)	Black	Las Vegas, Nevada	
2024-06-15	Leein Hinkley (43)	White	Auburn, Maine	A woman called police to report Hinkley had broken into her home and was fighting with her husband. When police arrived, the couple's house was on fire. Hinkley fled and set a second home on fire before being shot by state troopers. The man who fought with Hinkley was found dead in the home.
2024-06-14	Yerkoy Rayshun Shuler (42)	Black	Winston-Salem, North Carolina	Shuler died after being arrested for misdemeanor resisting, delaying, and obstructing a public officer and was sent into the back of the patrol car. The incident is still under investigation.
2024-06-14	unidentified person	Unknown	Philadelphia, Pennsylvania	Officials stated that a driver of a Mazda pickup truck made an illegal left U-turn and was struck and killed by a Pennsylvania State Police cruiser.
2024-06-14	Shantidra Harris (31)	Black	Milton, Georgia	Police responded to reports of shoplifting at a Kohl's store. After following the suspects' vehicle to a Walmart, one suspect was arrested at the scene while a second fled. A third suspect, Harris, allegedly carjacked another vehicle and drove towards an officer with it. The officer shot and killed Harris.
2024-06-13	Steven Ryan Todd (34)	White	Wilmington, North Carolina	
2024-06-13	Jerman Magana (30)	Hispanic	Compton, California	Two Los Angeles County Sheriff deputies fatally shot Magana as he reportedly shot at a police helicopter while on the rooftop of a house. The two deputies who shot Magana were on the ground.
2024-06-13	Sandra "Sandy" Schultz-Peters (66)	White	Myrtle Beach, South Carolina	Schultz-Peters died after a Horry County Police truck drove over her on the beach near Springmaid Pier, pinning her under one of its wheels.
2024-06-13	Mathue Allyn O'Malley (27)	Black	Youngstown, OH	
2024-06-12	William Kevin Guinn (54)	White	Sullivan County, Tennessee	An Sullivan County Sheriff's deputy arrived at a home to perform a welfare check and encountered Guinn, who was allegedly armed with a firearm. For reasons unknown, the deputy shot Guinn.
2024-06-12	Michael Warren Ristow (39)	White	Minneapolis, Minnesota	Minneapolis police officers responded to a report about Ristow threatened someone with a gun. When officers arrived, they encountered Ristow and he pointed a gun at them. All three officers opened fire, fatally striking him. A jammed gun was recovered from the scene.
2024-06-12	Karl Gregory (46)	Unknown	Woodbridge Township, New Jersey	The man, who was wanted for his connection to a homicide in East Harlem, was shot by a Woodbridge and New York City Police officer after he reportedly exited the Raritan Hotel and began shooting at an Woodbridge and New York City Police officers. Both suffered injuries from the event.
2024-06-12	Jason Lowery (41)	Unknown	Orange, Vermont	
2024-06-11	Ruben Ollarzabal Chairez (51)	Hispanic	Edinburg, Texas	
2024-06-11	Timothy Edward Wells (41)	White	Eugene, Oregon	A state trooper pulled Wells over for a traffic stop when Wells reportedly began reaching for a gun. The trooper employed a taser but fatally shot Wells when Wells got a hold of the gun.
2024-06-11	Alexander Aguilar-Larios (20)	Hispanic	Los Angeles, California	
2024-06-11	Jennifer Rose Dobbins (30)	White	Corona, California	A police was chasing a man and a woman, when the man attacked the police officer after hiding behind a corner. During the fight, the woman started repeatedly kicking the officer. The officer shot the woman, who succumbed to her injuries, and the man was charged with multiple felonies.
2024-06-11	Damion Ladeal Jones (31)	Black	Opelika, Alabama	
2024-06-11	unidentified male	Unknown	Clayton County, Georgia	
2024-06-11	Selwyn Brown (54)	Black	Whitehall Township, Pennsylvania	
2024-06-11	John Charles Neiswender (69)	White	South Bend, Indiana	Neiswender was reportedly chasing someone with a knife. When the South Bend police officers arrived, one officer unsuccessfully deployed his taser, resulting in another officer shooting him.
2024-06-10	Daniel Ryan (65)	Unknown	Belfast, Maine	Ryan called 911 and said he would burn down his apartment building if law enforcement did not respond. Deputies responded and shot Ryan after he allegedly charged at them holding a flaming gas can.
2024-06-10	Ridge Rhodes (29)	White	Mifflin County, Pennsylvania	
2024-06-10	Noel Hernandez (35)	Hispanic	Columbus, Ohio	
2024-06-10	José Luis Rincón López (24)	Hispanic	Clayton, North Carolina	
2024-06-09	Willy Lumaine (33)	Black	Fort Myers, Florida	
2024-06-09	Shannon Boyd (42)	Unknown	Arlington, Texas	Officers responded to a domestic disturbance call in Red Kane Park, when they arrived, they saw Boyd pointed a gun at his girlfriend and fired multiple shots at her. Officers then discharged their weapon killing him. The woman still remains in critical condition.
2024-06-09	Jeffrey Martinez (28)	Hispanic	Española, New Mexico	
2024-06-09	Kendrell Hall (22)	Black	Harrisburg, Pennsylvania	Hall was shot and killed after opening fire on an officer and a K9 officer. The K9 was shot and is in stable condition.
2024-06-08	Vadim V. Sashchenko (43)	White	Vancouver, Washington	Police responded to reports of a man with an "aggressive" German Shepherd who had bit a person. When an officer arrived, Sashchenko aimed the gun at him before throwing it on the ground, at which point the officer shot him. The dog was tethered to a dumpster and transported to a humane society.
2024-06-08	Travis Tauren Martin (41)	Black	Roanoke, Virginia	Roanoke police officers initiated a traffic stop near a gas station. Travis Martin exited the vehicle with an axe and hit a police car with it. Martin then moved towards the police officers with the axe in hand, causing officers to fatally shoot Martin.
2024-06-08	Maurice Smith (43)	Black	Las Vegas, Nevada	
2024-06-08	Daniel Leslie (34)	White	Prescott, Arizona	An officer attempted to arrest Leslie for an earlier domestic violence incident. The officer shot Leslie when he attempted to reenter his home. Leslie was unarmed, and the officer who shot him was charged with manslaughter.
2024-06-08	Jason Sekerak (39)	White	Corinth, Mississippi	
2024-06-08	Harley Olson (42)	White	Cut Bank, Montana	
2024-06-07	Christian Chestnut (37)	Black	Panthersville, Georgia	A reserve officer shot and killed Chestnut in a murder-suicide.
2024-06-07	David Martinez (30)	Hispanic	Amarillo, Texas	Martinez, a pedestrian, was struck and killed by a police vehicle while crossing the road.
2024-06-07	unidentified male	Unknown	St. Augustine, Florida	
2024-06-07	Steven Nelson (39)	Unknown	Hiram, Maine	
2024-06-06	Gabriel Gelpi Rodriguez (33)	Hispanic	Miami-Dade County, Florida	
2024-06-06	Tyquarius Armstrong (21)	Black	Baton Rouge, Louisiana	When DEA Task Force and EBR sheriff's deputies were conducting a search warrant, Armstrong opened fired on the deputies in the bedroom. One of the deputies was seriously injured. The deputies then returned fire, fatally striking Armstrong.
2024-06-06	Trae Stewart Spurlock (26)	White	Casper, Wyoming	Spurlock was shot and killed by Casper police. Spurlock stated “I’m not going to jail tonight. That’s why that f***ing rifle is there. I’m not going to f***ing jail tonight, either death by cop or not, I’ve been in plenty of firefights in my life. I’m not afraid of another one. Take that as you will.” Authorities later found his blood-alcohol level to be 0.267 BrAC. Spurlock lunged for the rifle and was shot by police. Officer William Maples who killed Spurlock was not charged.
2024-06-05	Craig McGrath (37)	White	Brentwood, Pennsylvania	An Allegheny County police attempted to pull over McGrath, who was driving a stolen Nissan Rogue, but McGrath sped away. Minutes later, McGrath was spotted by Brentwood Police, commencing a vehicle pursuit. Eventually, the chase ended on a residential street. When McGrath attempted to flee, a fight reportedly broke out between McGrath and a Brentwood police officer. During the fight, the officer shot McGrath multiple times. McGrath was later pronounced dead at a hospital. McGrath was allegedly armed with a firearm.
2024-06-05	Arnold Azamar (51)	Unknown	Dover, Delaware	Azamar, who had previously been banned from a senior living center for aggressive behavior, was being escorted from the facility by an employee. Azamar assaulted the employee, then retrieved a gun from his vehicle and fatally shot the employee. State troopers arrived and shot Azamar after he allegedly raised the gun towards them.
2024-06-05	Jamme Mitchell (39)	Black	Jacksonville, North Carolina	
2024-06-05	Michael Brown (52)	Black	Milford, Connecticut	
2024-06-05	Jarray Birdon (38)	Black	Susanville, California	
2024-06-04	Rolin Hill (34)	Black	Virginia Beach, Virginia	Sheriff's deputies restrained Hill at a jail following his arrest for trespassing. He died, and his death was ruled a homicide by asphyxiation. Three sheriff's deputies were charged with murder in connection with his death.
2024-06-04	Damion Allen Linder (41)	White	Sturgeon, Missouri	
2024-06-04	unidentified female	Unknown	Coloma, Michigan	A female told the dispatchers that someone was going to burn down her house. When the police arrived, she pointed a gun at the officers, prompting them to shoot her. She was later pronounced deceased.
2024-06-04	Robby Jay Hernandez (19)	Hispanic	San Antonio, Texas	Hernandez was fatally shot by San Antonio police officer Officer Anthony Lane inside an apartment unit after Lane allegedly witnessed Hernandez pointing a firearm at his girlfriend inside the unit.
2024-06-04	Jason Lee McDuffy (44)	White	Montgomery County, Virginia	Officers found a pickup truck which was stolen the previous day. When they pulled the truck over, McDuffy refused to exit and a pursuit ensued. McDuffy was shot and killed when he showed a gun after the pursuit.
2024-06-04	Preston Johannsen Banks IV (27)	Black	Flowood, Mississippi	Flowood police officers were given a description of a suspicious man. When Officers found Banks, a foot chase ensued. Banks was then shot and killed after pointing a gun at them.
2024-06-04	Elvin Dean Land (67)	Black	Jasper, Texas	When officers were serving a warrant, Land fired shots at them. One of them was struck and they returned fire, killing him.
2024-06-03	Roy Chadwick (48)	White	Lubbock, Texas	Chadwick was fatally shot after charging a knife at the police.
2024-06-03	Tyler Jacob May (21)	Black	Anchorage, Alaska	Police shot and killed May after responding to a report of shots fired.
2024-06-02	Joshua Main (27)	Unknown	Phoenix, Arizona	According to the police, they were told that a man with a gun was attempting to rob someone of their motorcycle. Officers located the man on the motorcycle, then the man raised his gun and was shot and killed.
2024-06-02	Nicholas Daniel Austin Papala (25)	White	Spartanburg County, South Carolina	After a crash on I-85, Papala ran into a nearby wooden area. When four Spartanburg County sheriff's deputies encountered Papala, he reportedly reached for an object in his waistband. The four Spartanburg County sheriff's deputies then fatally shot Papala.
2024-06-02	Ryan Prudhomme (41)	Unknown	Nashua, New Hampshire	Nashua Police arrived at a Lowe's store after police in Pelham told them that Prudhomme was armed and had left his residence. Nashua Police encountered Prudhomme and two officer fired non-lethal weapons at Prudhomme, while a third shot Prudhomme in the chest. Prudhomme died from his gunshot wound.
2024-06-01	Jenna Mills (28)	Unknown	Waterloo, Iowa	A police officer was driving a motorcycle when he lost control of his bike and crashed into a metal barrier. The sole passenger one the bike, Mills, died as the result. Investigators later determined that the police officer, Northup, has a blood alcohol concentration more than three times over the legal limit. He was charged with operating under the influence and homicide by vehicle and several others. Northup is still with the department as of June 13, 2025.
2024-06-01	unidentified female	Unknown	Fort Lauderdale, Florida	A woman who was driving the sedan made a U-turn and collided with a police vehicle.
2024-06-01	Lataurus Harrison (44)	Black	Anderson, Indiana	When deputies attempted to serve an arrest warrant, they encountered Harrison inside a car in the driveway. The deputies gave him several commands to show his hands but he refused to comply. Then one of the deputies shot him. A firearm was recovered from the scene.

== See also ==
- Death in custody § United States
- Henry A. Wallace Police Crime Public Database
- List of cases of police brutality
- List of countries with annual rates and counts for killings by law enforcement officers
- List of law enforcement officers killed in the line of duty in the United States
- List of law enforcement officers convicted for an on-duty killing in the United States
- List of shootings by US immigration agents
- List of police reforms related to the George Floyd protests
- List of unarmed African Americans killed by law enforcement officers in the United States
- Lists of killings by law enforcement officers
- Police brutality in the United States
- Police misconduct § United States
- Police riot § United States
- Police use of deadly force in the United States
