= Bina D'Costa =

Bina D'Costa is an Australian-Bangladeshi academic who specialises in conflict and gender studies in South Asia. As of March 2026 she is professor of international relations at the Coral Bell School of Asia Pacific Affairs of the Australian National University. She served as a senior migration and displacement specialist with UNICEF from 2016 to 2018.

== Early life and education ==
Bina D'Costa earned an MA in international relations from the University of Dhaka in Dhaka, Bangladesh, and an MA in peace and conflict studies from the University of Notre Dame in Indiana, United States. She went on to graduate with a PhD from the Australian National University (ANU) in Canberra.

== Career ==
D'Costa is an Australian-Bangladeshi academic who specialises in conflict and gender studies in South Asia.

She worked as a post-doctoral fellow on "poverty, inequality and development in post-conflict Africa", at the University of Otago, Dunedin, New Zealand, and as a John Vincent Fellow in the Department of International Relations of the Research School of Asian and Pacific Studies at ANU. She has worked on projects for a number of civil society organisations in Thailand, Sri Lanka, Nepal, Bangladesh, Pakistan and India. She worked as a consultant for the United Nations Research Institute for Social Development and Department for International Development in the UK.

From 2007 onwards, she has worked on the Thai-Burma border in various refugee camps, including Mae La, Umpiem Mai, and Nu Po. She also led human security training for human rights defenders from Myanmar (Burma). She has also worked with the Rohingya stateless communities in Naya Para, Kutupalong, and other camps in Bangladesh since then.

In 2008 she was at the Global Justice Center in New York City. She was a visiting scholar at the Refugee Studies Centre, University of Oxford, from 2011 to 2012, and at the Graduate Institute of International and Development Studies, Geneva, Switzerland, from 2012 to 2014.

In 2017 D'Costa served as the Asia rapporteur of the Asia–Europe Meeting on Children and Human Rights, which included of 55 member states.

She is a professor of international relations at the Coral Bell School of Asia Pacific Affairs of the Australian National University in Canberra, Australia.

From 2016 to 2018, during Europe's refugee emergency, she served as a senior migration and displacement specialist with UNICEF, leading the research program based at the Innocenti Office of Research in Italy to establish their Migration and Displacement program. (Note: UNICEF Innocenti – Global Office of Research and Foresight is housed in the Ospedale degli Innocenti in Florence (now known as Istituto degli Innocenti), "perhaps the oldest continuously operating children's care institution in the world".) She served on UNICEF's Rohingya Emergency Response Team in Cox's Bazar in Bangladesh in 2017.

In March 2023 the Human Rights Council added D'Costa to its Working Group of Experts on People of African Descent, joining Miriam Ekiudoko of Hungary, American Dominique Day, and Catherine S. Namakula of Uganda. On 6 November 2025, as chair of the United Nations Working Group of Experts on People of African Descent, D'Costa addressed the Third Committee of the United Nations General Assembly in New York.

== Publications and research ==
D'Costa's research has focused on children's displacement and has covered war crimes, genocide and struggles for justice in South Asia; human rights activism and indigenous politics in South Asia; identity politics, and conflicts. She has contributed to policy research in UNICEF, OHCHR, the UNRISD, and the ARC Centre of Excellence for the Elimination of Violence Against Women (CEVAW), as well and various governments' aid and international development programs.

In her 2011 book Nation Building, Gender, and War Crimes in South Asia, D'Costa wrote about the murder of Bihari citizens during the Bangladesh Liberation war. The Daily Star described her book as a "mammoth task". In it, she provides a gendered analysis of conflict in South Asia. She has also carried out research on Birangona, rape victims of the Bangladesh Liberation War. She tracked down Australian doctor Geoffrey Davis, who carried out abortions for rape victims after the war ended.

D'Costa has also written on how Rohingya people have been excluded and marginalised by the government of Myanmar.

== Other roles and activities ==
As of 2010 D'Costa was a member of the Dristhipat Writers' Collective.

As of 2026 she is a member of the International Chittagong Hill Tracts Commission in Bangladesh, a human rights advocacy body for Indigenous communities in the Chittagong Hill Tracts in Bangladesh. She is also a UN Special Procedures Mandate Holder and an Australian Research Council Future Fellow.

== Recognition and awards ==
In 2020, D'Costa received the Distinguished Alumni Award from the Kroc Institute for International Peace Studies at the University of Notre Dame, and in 2022 she was the recipient of the J. Ann Tickner Award from the International Studies Association.

== Selected works ==
- Gender and Global Politics in the Asia-Pacific (2010)
- Nationbuilding, Gender and War Crimes in South Asia (2011)
- Children and Global Conflict (2015)
- Children and Violence: The Politics of Conflict in South Asia (2016)
- Cascades of Violence: War, Crime and Peacebuilding Across South Asia, co-authored with John Braithwaite (2018)
