= Finchley Progressive Synagogue =

Liberal synagogue in Finchley, London, England

- Location of the synagogue in Greater London

Religion
- Affiliation: Reform Judaism
- Ecclesiastical or organisational status: Synagogue
- Leadership: Rabbi Rebecca Birk
- Status: Active

Location
- Location: Hutton Grove, North Finchley, Borough of Barnet, London, England
- Country: United Kingdom
- Coordinates: 51°36′49″N 0°10′55″W

Architecture
- Established: 1953 (as a congregation)
- Completed: 1964

Website
- fps.org

Finchley Progressive Synagogue is a Liberal Jewish congregation and synagogue, located in North Finchley in the Borough of Barnet, London, England, in the United Kingdom.

The rabbi is Rebecca Birk. Synagogue membership is approximately 350 families.

== History ==
Logo of the congregation

Established as the Finchley Liberal Jewish Congregation in 1953, the congregation initially met at North Finchley Library, in private houses and at Moss Hall School. In 1964 a synagogue in Hutton Grove was built as Finchley Liberal Jewish Synagogue, and was renamed as Finchley Progressive Synagogue in 1971.

Previous rabbis at FPS have been Charles Familant, S. Gerstein, Frank Hellner (1966–1999), Rabbi Mark Goldsmith (1999–2006) and Rabbi Neil Janes (c. 2006–2010). The current rabbi, Rebecca Birk, took up office in 2011.

== Current activities ==
The synagogue has actively campaigned on behalf of Syrian refugees, working together with Citizens UK and Middlesex University Students Union. In October 2015 Barnet Council became the first Conservative-run local authority district to resettle refugees under the Syrian Vulnerable Persons Resettlement Scheme, agreeing to admit 50 Syrian refugees. The synagogue has continued to provide support to the refugees, and in October 2018 the Council pledged to continue to offer sanctuary to child refugees.

Finchley Progressive Synagogue has been characterised as an 'urban eco synagogue'. It was one of four synagogues which established the 'eco synagogue' concept in January 2018, with a mix of adult education about climate change and practical environmental initiatives such as minimizing food waste.

== See also ==
- History of the Jews in England
- List of Jewish communities in the United Kingdom
- List of synagogues in the United Kingdom
