= Kler Heh =

Thai-Burmese footballer

Personal information
- Full name: Kler Low Eh Hmoo Heh
- Date of birth: 21 October 1996 (age 30)
- Place of birth: Umpiem Mai Refugee Camp, Tak, Thailand
- Position: Winger

Youth career
- 2006–2015: Sheffield United

Senior career*
Years	Team	Apps	(Gls)
2014–2017	Sheffield United	0	(0)
2014	→ Stocksbridge PS (loan)	7	(0)
2016	→ Dumbarton (loan)	4	(0)
2017	DFK Dainava	9	(0)
2017–2018	FK Jelgava	10	(3)
2018	FK Jonava	8	(0)
2019	Stocksbridge PS	0	(0)
2019	Sheffield Town	12	(0)
Total		50	(3)
- * Club domestic league appearances and goals as of 13:26, 1 August 2018 (UTC)

Kler Heh (born 21 October 1996) is a Karen former professional footballer who plays as a winger. Born in a refugee camp near the Myanmar border in Thailand, his family was resettled to Sheffield under the British government's Gateway Protection Programme in 2006. He came through the youth system at Sheffield United before signing a professional contract.

== Early life ==
Kler Heh was born in the Umpiem Mai Refugee Camp on the Thailand-Myanmar border in Tak Province. His parents had fled there from the Karen conflict between the Karen miniority group and the government of Myanmar. He was resettled in the UK with his family under the government's Gateway Protection Programme in 2006. In March 2015, he signed a professional contract to play for Sheffield United.

== Club career ==
After signing his first professional contract with the Blades in Summer 2015, he joined Scottish Championship side Dumbarton on loan in January 2016. He made his senior debut as an 84th-minute substitute in a 1–0 victory over Livingston.

Heh joined Lithuanian I Lyga club DFK Dainava Alytus in March 2017 and became an important part of the team, before being signed by Latvian Higher League side FK Jelgava in the 2017 summer transfer window. In January 2018, he signed for FK Jonava.

== International career ==
Kler Heh is eligible to represent the Myanmar football team. In the summer of 2015 he announced that he would represent Myanmar internationally. The Myanmar Football Federation has stated that it is interested in having him play for the national team but that it would be difficult due to Myanmar's strict laws forbidding dual citizenship, in effect meaning that Heh would have to renounce his Thai and British passports to play for the national team.
