= Alma Birk, Baroness Birk =

British journalist, Labour Party politician and Government minister

The Right Honourable The Baroness Birk JP

Personal details
- Born: Alma Lillian Wilson; 22 September 1917 Brighton, East Sussex, England, UK
- Died: 29 December 1996 (aged 79) Westminster, England, UK
- Party: Labour
- Occupation: Politician

Alma Lillian Birk, Baroness Birk JP (née Wilson; 22 September 1917 – 29 December 1996) was a British journalist, Labour Party politician and Government minister.

== Early life and education ==
Alma Lillian Wilson was born on 22 September 1917 in Brighton. Her parents were Barnett Wilson, who ran a "successful greeting-card company", and Alice Wilson. She was educated at South Hampstead High School before studying economics at the London School of Economics.

== Political career ==
After graduating, Birk became involved in Labour Party politics. She unsuccessfully ran for election to Salisbury City Council as a Labour candidate before being elected to Finchley Borough Council, where she served as leader of the Labour group from 1950 to 1953.

She unsuccessfully stood as a Labour candidate to become a Member of Parliament on three occasions: for Ruislip-Northwood in the 1950 general election and for Portsmouth West in the 1951 and 1955 general elections.

Birk was created a life peer as Baroness Birk of Regent's Park in Greater London on 15 September 1967. In her maiden speech she called for an enhanced probation service to help deal with juvenile crime:

I would like to see a bigger probation service, better paid, because a probation officer is sometimes the only person with whom the young person can create a stable relationship, which is absolutely essential.

In 1969 she was made chair of the Health Education Council. She served as a Baroness-in-Waiting between March and October 1974. From 1974 to 1979 she was a Parliamentary Under-Secretary of State in the Department of the Environment, and then became Minister of State in the Privy Council Office in 1979. In opposition, she spoke in the House of Lords on the environment between 1979 and 1986, and on arts, libraries, heritage and broadcasting between 1986 and 1993.

She was a member of the Fabian Society and the Howard League for Penal Reform.

== Personal life ==
She married Ellis Birk, a solicitor and director of the Daily Mirror Group, on 24 December 1939. The couple had two children. Their granddaughter, Rebecca Birk, is Rabbi of Finchley Progressive Synagogue.

In the 1960s she became associate editor of Nova. During this period Birk also sat as a magistrate in an ordinary magistrates' court and in a matrimonial court, having become a justice of the peace in 1952. She was chair of Redbridge Jewish Youth Centre between 1970 and 1996 and on the executive of the Council of Christians and Jews between 1971 and 1977. She was the president of the Association of Art Institutions from 1984 to 1996, and the president of the Craft Arts Design Association from 1984 to 1990. She was made a Fellow of the Royal Society of Arts in 1980. She also served on the Board of Governors of the British Film Institute.

== Sources ==
- Pottle, Mark (October 2008). "Birk, Alma Lillian, Baroness Birk (1917–1996)". Oxford Dictionary of National Biography (online ed.). Oxford University Press. doi:10.1093/ref:odnb/64015. (Subscription, Wikipedia Library access or UK public library membership required.)
