= Gateway Program =

Gateway Program may refer to:

- Gateway Program (Northeast Corridor)
- Gateway Program (Vancouver)
- Gateway Protection Programme
