= MOSAIC (organization) =

Canadian migrant services agency (1976-)

- Nickname: MOSAIC BC
- Predecessor: Language Aid for Ethnic Groups, and Multilingual Social Services
- Formation: 1976
- Type: not for profit
- Purpose: Refugee and immigrant support services
- Headquarters: Vancouver
- CEO: Olga Stachova
- Website: www.mosaicbc.org

Multi-lingual Orientation Service Association for Immigrant Communities, primarily called MOSAIC, sometimes called MOSAIC BC, is a Vancouver based not for profit organization that supports immigrants and refugees to resettle in Vancouver.

The organizations provides programs that support newcomers with education, immigrations, employment, finances and safety.

== History ==
MOSAIC was established as a not for profit in 1976 as a merger of Language Aid for Ethnic Groups and Multilingual Social Services.

In 2014, the organization sponsored a Youth Violence and Family Relationships event where its staff facilitated a forum about family relationships and violence. By 2015, MOSAIC was supporting over 25,000 immigrants per year. In 2019, it partnered with the Refugee Council of Australia on Operation #NotForgotten a program to support refugees held in immigration detention in Australia. By 2021, 144 refugees had been resettled.

During the COVID-19 pandemic, MOSAIC received a $495,000 grant from the Public Health Agency of Canada's Immunization Partnership Fund to increase acceptance of COVID-19 vaccines among immigrants, refugees and racialized groups.

== Organization ==
In 2015, its $24m budget was 45% funded by the Canadian federal government, the rest mostly provided by Government of British Columbia and private donations from groups including the Law Society of British Columbia. Nine per cent of revenue is generated from the sale of translations services. In 2015, MOSAIC employed over 300 staff.

== Services ==
The organization provides languages programs, career services, and loans to help immigrants start a business. It provides a range of serviced for youth, and for early childhood development. It also runs programs that give advice about immigration law, employment standards, housing, education enrolment, and the provincial healthcare system.
