= David Bitel =

David Lee Bitel
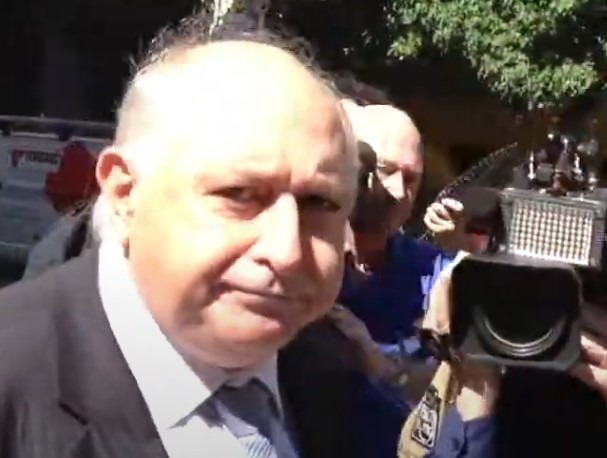
- Born: March 1, 1952
- Died: August 20, 2016 (aged 64); Sydney, Australia
- Occupation: Lawyer
- Years active: 1976–2016
- Employer: Parish Patience Immigration Lawyers
- Organization(s): Refugee Council of Australia, International Commission of Jurists (Australia)
- Known for: Immigration law, human rights advocacy
- Notable work: Contributions to Australian immigration law, Refugee Advocacy
- Board member of: Law Society of New South Wales Immigration Law Advisory Committee, Human Rights Committee
- Criminal charges: Sexual assault, Rape
- Criminal status: Deceased before trial

David Lee Bitel (March 1, 1952 – August 20, 2016) was an Australian lawyer specializing in immigration law. He was a partner at the Sydney-based law firm Parish Patience Immigration Lawyers. Later in his career, he held leadership positions in several Australian legal and human rights organizations. In 2012, Bitel was arrested and charged with sexual assault of multiple male clients of South Asian origin. In 2016, Bitel died of stomach cancer in Sydney before standing trial.

== Career ==
Bitel joined Parish Patience Immigration Lawyers in 1976 and made partner, developing a successful practice focused on immigration law. Many of his clients were of South Asian origin. Bitel developed particularly strong ties with the Bangladeshi-Australian community and helped so many clients from the country immigrate to Australia that he once referred to himself as "the father of Bangladeshi Australians".

He was a consultant author for Australian Immigration Law and was named an Honorary Accredited Specialist in Immigration Law by the Law Society of New South Wales. From 2008 to 2016, Bitel was regularly listed in Best Lawyers in Australia, published by the Australian Financial Review.

== Death ==
Bitel died from stomach cancer in Sydney on 20 August 2016.

== Accusations of sexual assault ==
On 4 December 2012, Bitel was arrested in Sydney and charged with 7 counts of sexual assault, including allegations of raping four male clients originally from Bangladesh, India, Nepal, and Pakistan. The incidents were alleged to have taken place in Sydney between 1995 and 2004. By 2016, Bitel faced 21 charges relating to alleged assault of 6 previous clients.

His law firm Parish Patience Lawyers attempted to prevent his name from being publicly disclosed, citing potential financial damage to the firm, but their request was denied.

In April 2015, after a six-month committal hearing, a Sydney magistrate ruled that Bitel would stand trial, stating there was a reasonable prospect that a jury, if properly informed, could convict the accused. However, he died before the trial could take place.

In 2004 a New Zealand lawyer had filed a complaint with the Australian Federal Police after hearing allegations of crimes committed by Bitel during his work visits to Dhaka, Bangladesh. Following an interview conducted by New Zealand police, no action was taken.
