= Migrant Help =

Charitable organization

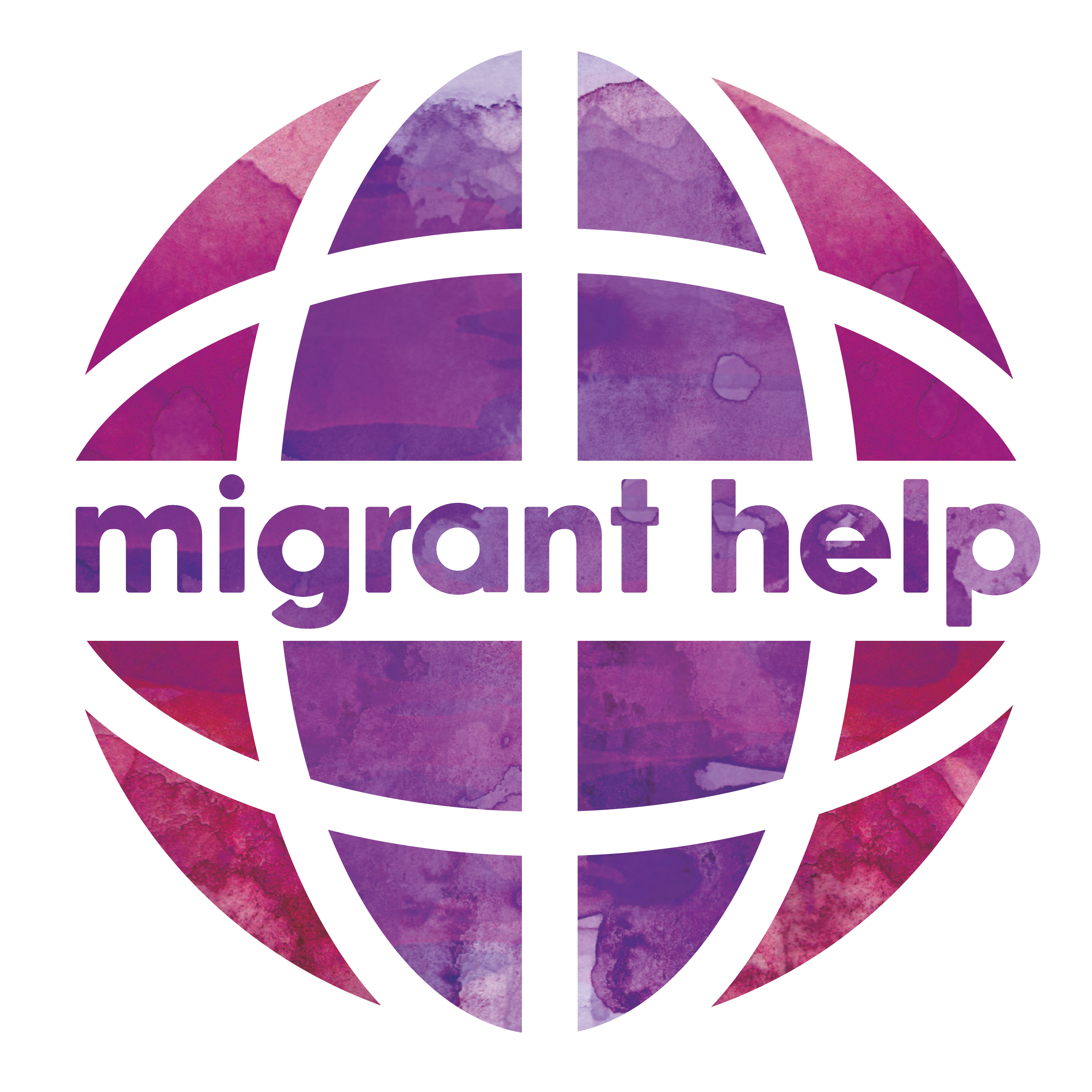
- Founded: 1963; 63 years ago
- Founded at: Kent, United Kingdom
- Type: Charity
- Registration no.: 1088631
- Purpose: "Our vision is for a global society that protects victims of exploitation and displacement, treats them with respect and enables them to thrive as individuals."
- Region served: United Kingdom
- Chief Executive Officer: Caroline O’Connor
- Website: migranthelpuk.org
- Formerly called: Migrant Helpline; Kent Committee for the Welfare of Migrants (KCWM)

Migrant Help is a United Kingdom-based national charity that has been supporting migrants since 1963.

The charity operates from 10 offices across the United Kingdom, providing advice, guidance and support to people seeking asylum, refugees and victims of modern-day slavery and human trafficking. Asylum support services include face-to-face advice both in initial accommodation centers and on an outreach basis, along with a nationwide telephone service. Most people seeking asylum have fled war or persecution and many arrive with limited understanding of life in the UK. Migrant Help provides them with advice, information and support to negotiate the asylum system, access services and overcome the challenges of integration.

Migrant Help works on Syrian Resettlement programs with local authorities in South East England, welcoming new families to the UK and supporting and orienting them to their new communities over an extended period. The charity supports access to local healthcare and education services, English lessons, specialist counselling, managing budgets and becoming work ready.

Migrant Help also supports victims of modern-day slavery and human trafficking in England, Wales, Scotland and Northern Ireland.

The charity works with a number of organisations around the UK including local authorities, strategic partners and volunteer groups on community-based schemes.

== Clear Voice ==
Clear Voice is a trading subsidiary of Migrant Help that delivers professional interpreting and translation services. Clear Voice interpreters work extensively with refugees and people seeking asylum.

Clear Voice was established by Migrant Help in 2008 to provide high quality, cost-effective language services. Clear Voice specialises in the provision of telephone interpreting, face-to-face interpreting and translation services across the UK.

All of Clear Voice’s profits are returned to Migrant Help, supporting the parent charity’s work. In 2022, Clear Voice delivered over 9.3 million minutes of telephone interpreting. This resulted in a donation of £1.7 million to Migrant Help.

== History ==
=== Kent Committee for the Welfare of Migrants ===
The charity now known as Migrant Help was set up in 1963 by Helen Ellis MBE, a leading figure in the provision of welfare support to migrants travelling through the Port of Dover. The organisation, known at this time as the Kent Committee for the Welfare of Migrants (KCWM), was established in response to the growing number of migrants arriving at the Channel Ports.

In 1970, immigrants were given right of appeal against decisions relating to their entry. The United Kingdom Immigrants Advisory Service (UKIAS), funded by the Home Office, was established to represent migrants on 'appeal'. KCWM worked alongside the UKIAS to support the welfare of migrants arriving at the ports in Kent.

=== Migrant Helpline ===
In 1993, Helen Ellis retired after 50 years of service to migrants. In the following year (1994), the charity adopted the new name of Migrant Helpline. That same year, the charity received a grant from the Home Office to deliver support services to newly arrived people seeking asylum.

In 2002, Migrant Helpline was asked by the Home Office to establish and operate the first Induction Center. Here, briefings were delivered to people seeking asylum about the asylum process and their rights and responsibilities. Migrant Helpline's operation expanded to London and a reception service for people seeking asylum opened in Croydon. The charity was funded to manage the London accommodation center for newly arrived people seeking asylum, known as 'Emergency Initial Accommodation'.

A number of projects were established in the following years including the 'Sunrise' project to help new refugees integrate into life in the UK, a 'Training and Employment' project was launched for refugees in Kent (until 2009) and Migrant Helpline was invited to provide an independent advisory service to foreign national prisoners in Canterbury Prison.

The 'European Migrant Advice' service was established in response to an increased need for support for EU migrants. This service was later extended in 2010 to meet support needs in Suffolk and Norfolk.

In 2008, the United Kingdom Human Trafficking Center approached the charity to provide support for victims of labour exploitation. The Victims of Slavery Support Service team was established.

=== Migrant Help ===
In 2010, Migrant Helpline became known as Migrant Help. The charity continues to work to improve the lives of vulnerable migrants in partnership with other organisations and community groups. Migrant Help was shortlisted for Charity Awards in 2016 for innovation in advice and support to people seeking asylum.

== Funding ==
Migrant Help has received significant Home Office funding since 1994. In 2019, it secured a £100 million contract to run the Home Office system called “Advice, Issue Reporting and Eligibility (AIRE)” services, and act as the official point of contact for refugees to get advice on their asylum claims. In 2021, the value of this Home Office contract rose to £235 million.

== Projects ==
Throughout its lifetime Migrant Help has participated in a number of programs supporting migrants and refugees. These projects have been undertaken both independently and in association with other organisations, in particular the Home Office.

Migrant Help Projects
Period	Project	Description
1998‍–‍1999	Dover Asylum Project – Home Office	Provision of reception and casework support to Kosovar refugees arriving from the Balkans.
2004‍–‍2009	Gateway Protection Programme – Home Office	Provision of reception and orientation services for refugees being resettled in the UK.
2005‍–‍2006	Sunrise Pilot Project – Home Office	Helping new refugees to integrate and find work. Included support writing CVs, identifying suitable jobs and interview training.
2006‍–‍2007	Gateway Protection Programme Resettlement Support Service in Brighton – Home Office	Casework support services to newly settled refugees in Brighton.
2005‍–‍2016	European Migrant Advice Service	Supporting the integration of vulnerable and isolated EU migrants into local communities and services across Kent and Suffolk.
2006‍–‍2009	Training and Employment Project with Big Lottery Fund	Supporting refugees in Kent to access training and secure employment
2015‍–‍2016	Gurkha Information, Advice and Guidance Service	Support services helping retired Gurkha families successfully settle into like in the UK.
2015‍–‍2018	Syrian Vulnerable Persons Resettlement Kent	To provide support to refugees from Syria resettling in Kent.
2016‍–‍2017	Syrian Vulnerable Persons Resettlement Essex	To provide support to refugees from Syria resettling in Essex.

== Employment ==
Migrant Help employs 454 people from 40 different countries of origin. Approximately 47% of staff are non-UK born and many have personal experiences of the refugee journey.

Migrant Help holds the "Investors in People" accreditation, is authorised by the Office of Immigration Services Commissioner, holds an Advice Quality Standard mark and is a National Living Wage employer.
