= Private Sponsorship of Refugees Program =

Canadian refugee resettlement program

The Private Sponsorship of Refugees Program (PSR) is a Canadian government initiative that allows for refugees to resettle in Canada with support and funding from private or joint government-private sponsorship.

Established in 1978 under Operation Lifeline, the program has since resettled and provided support for over 200,000 refugees under various initiatives and with fluctuating annual intakes. The PSR program is part of the larger Global Refugee Sponsorship Initiative (GRSI), launched in Ottawa in December 2016, led by Immigration, Refugees and Citizenship Canada (IRCC), United Nations High Commissioner for Refugees (UNHCR), Open Society Foundations, the Giustra Foundation, and the University of Ottawa. The government also offers semi-private sponsorship through the Blended Visa Office-Referred (BVOR) program, which connects private sponsors with pre-screened and pre-interviewed refugees.

As of January 2020, the Canadian Government has resettled nearly 300,000 refugees through the PSR program since 1979. The Canadian system is constantly under reform to increase the involvement of refugees to shape their own resettlement experience; this program has influenced refugee policy in other Commonwealth countries as well, such as the UK and Australia.

== History ==
The origins of the Private Sponsorship of Refugees (PSR) Program are in the 1970s' Indochina refugee crisis. Established in 1978 under Operation Lifeline, the program was initiated after the appropriate legal framework had been provided through the 1976 Immigration Act.

Timeline
Time period	Notable event
1979	29,269 Vietnamese, Cambodian, and Laotian refugees settled under the initiative, and more throughout the early 1980s.
1994 – 1998	1,800 Afghan Ismaili refugees resettled through Project FOCUS, whereby the government sponsored refugees for three months, and fundraisers supported the following nine months. These cases were technically counted as Government Assisted Refugees (GARs) in a 3/9 joint sponsorship model.
2001	The Canadian Government piloted a 4/8 joint sponsorship model.
2001 – 2008	PSR numbers fluctuated around 3,000 per annum.
2009 – 2011	PSR intake increased to around 5,000 per annum.
2011	The government introduced a blended 3/9 program for Iraqi refugees, and another with Rainbow Refugee Committee to support LGBTQ refugees. New restrictions were also introduced, including limits on PSRs, caps the number of refugees who could be sponsored by missions abroad and on applications for sponsorships by Sponsorship Agreement Holders in order to improve management. Regulatory changes were implemented to formalise applications, which limited the eligibility for Groups of Five and Community Sponsors. The age of dependency was reduced from 22 to 19, which made fewer refugee families eligible for sponsorship.
2012	Intake of PSRs dropped by 24% from 2011 levels.
2013	The government pledged to resettle 1,300 Syrian refugees by the end of 2014.
2015	PSR numbers exceeded that of GARs.
2015 Jun	Lifeline Syria was launched as a result of the humanitarian crisis resulting from the Syrian Civil War. Its main aim was to aid the resettlement of Syrian refugees in the GTA, including aiding assisting sponsorship groups with sponsorship applications.
2015 Oct	Liberals pledged to welcome 25,000 Syrian refugees to Canada before 2016.
2015 Nov	Around 69,000 Syrian refugees were resettled to Canada in total as of this date. More than 42,000 non-Syrian refugees came to Canada through private sponsorship during the same period.
2016 Jul	UK Government launches its first Community Sponsorship scheme.
2016 Dec	In partnership with the UNHCR and the Open Society Foundations, the Government of Canada launched a major initiative in order to globally promote the PSR Program.
2017 Jan – 2018 Aug	Quebec froze the intake of new private sponsorship applications due to the high number of applications already in the system, with the processing time for submitted applications between 8 and 18 months.
2018	Immigration, Refugees and Citizenship Canada aims to facilitate the resettlement of 18,000 PSRs by the end of 2018.
2019 Jun	The Rainbow Refugees Assistance Partnership was announced by the Government of Canada, officially launching in 2020.
2020 Jan	As of this date, the Canadian Government resettled nearly 300,000 refugees through the PSR program since 1979.

=== Results ===
As of January 2020, the Canadian Government has resettled nearly 300,000 refugees through the PSR program since 1979, while also helping with family reunification. Around 69,000 Syrian refugees have been resettled to Canada since November 2015. More than 42,000 non-Syrian refugees came to Canada through private sponsorship during the same period.

Of all refugees resettled in 2018, a total of 18,763 were privately sponsored, while 8,156 were government-assisted and 1,157 were admitted under the Blended Visa Office-Referred refugee (BVOR) program. The planned and actual admissions of PSRs in 2016 represented a significant increase over historical levels. That year, among a total of 27,957 resettled refugees, 4,434 resettled as BVOR refugees; while 18,362 were privately sponsored refugees, which slightly exceeded the planned admissions range of 15,000–18,000.

Privately sponsored refugees and Blended visa office-referred refugees admitted in 2018 and 2019 by destination
Province / territory	2019		2018	
Province / territory	PSR	BVOR	PSR	BVOR
Newfoundland and Labrador	77	17	66	11
Prince Edward Island	26	1	25	5
Nova Scotia	258	98	231	131
New Brunswick	64	8	48	13
Quebec	3,610	0	4,289	0
Ontario	7,748	393	8,313	604
Manitoba	1,104	155	931	69
Saskatchewan	558	22	496	62
Alberta	4,113	170	3,015	80
British Columbia	1,564	125	1,336	169
Yukon	0	4	1	10
Northwest Territories	8	0	5	3
Nunavut	0	0	0	0
Not stated	13	0	7	0
Total	19,143	993	18,763	1,157
Total	20,136		19,920	

Permanent residents admitted by gender
Gender	Privately Sponsored Refugees			Blended Visa Office-Referred refugees		
Gender	2019	2018	2016	2019	2018	2016
Female	8,746	8,732	18,362	480	598	4,434
Male	10,397	10,031	8,734	513	559	2,168
Other	0	N/A	N/A	0	N/A	N/A
Total	19,143	18,763	9,628	993	1,157	2,266

== Sponsorship ==
A sponsorship group must support their privately sponsored refugee for one year upon their arrive or until the PSR can support themselves, whichever comes first.

Sponsors must meet the criteria for sponsorship, which includes being able to provide social and emotional support, as well as residential and financial support, food, and clothing. The sponsors are legally bound to provide income support, which generally ends after 12 months. Private funds provide for the first year of resettlement; while government covers health care/children's education. In the second year of resettlement, if the refugees become permanent residents when they arrive, they will be able to apply for means-tested governmental social welfare benefits if their sponsor has not been successful in helping them find employment.

People can choose to sponsor a specific refugee or refugee family, so long as they are eligible under the PSR program. If one chooses to sponsor a refugee they personally know, the processing time may take longer than the regular process and the Government of Canada will not provide financial assistance.

=== Types of private sponsorships ===
There are three types of private sponsors in Canada, which can be applied for directly through the Government of Canada or through Lifeline Syria:

1. Sponsorship Agreement Holders (SAHs): incorporated organisations that have formal agreements with the government to support a refugee family for 12 months. They are generally expected to sponsor multiple refugees each year and to have prior sponsorship experience. Most (75%) SAHs are religious, ethnic, community, or humanitarian organisations.
  - Constituent Groups: groups who work with SAHs to sponsor refugees under the SAH’s agreement.
  - Co-sponsors: an individual or another organization who shares the responsibility with the SAH to support the sponsored refugee(s).
2. Groups of Five: groups consisting of a minimum of five Canadian citizens or permanent residents over the age of 18 who sponsor those recognized as refugees by either the UNHCR or a foreign state. Groups of Five may only sponsor applicants who have already been granted refugee status. Lifeline Syria has helped people form Groups of Five by connecting hopeful private sponsors with those living in nearby communities.
3. Community sponsors: organisations, associations, or corporations in the community that sponsor refugees.

=== Blended Visa Office-Referred program ===
The Government of Canada's Blended Visa Office-Referred (BVOR) program connects sponsors with pre-screened and -interviewed refugees, and reduces the financial burden on private sponsors.

Prioritizing the most vulnerable refugees, the program partners with refugee referral organizations, such as the United Nations Refugee Agency (UNHCR), who identify refugees for resettlement through screening procedures that include both security and medical checks. Referred refugees are sponsored by the government for up to six months upon arrival through the Resettlement Assistance Program (RAP); Thereafter, private sponsors are responsible for up to an additional six months of financial support, one year of social and emotional support, and associated start-up costs. Sponsors are not required, however, to cover the cost of health care for BVOR refugees, who are provided temporary health care benefits through the Interim Federal Health Program (IFHP) until they become eligible for provincial or territorial health insurance.

Of all refugees resettled in 2018, a total of 1,157 were admitted under the BVOR Program. In 2016, among a total of 27,957 resettled refugees, 4,434 resettled as BVOR refugees.

=== Quebec ===
The Province of Quebec—through its Minister of International Relations and La Francophonie and Minister of Immigration, Francisation and Integration—has its own process for refugee sponsorship, available for groups of two to five people who reside in Quebec or non-profit organizations that agree to take responsibility for a refugee(s) by signing a 'collective sponsorship undertaking'. This sponsorship process requires cultural obligations of private sponsors, including organising French-speaking classes for the refugees and informing them about Quebec society and culture.

Collective sponsorships fall under the following categories:

- Experienced organizations "that only sponsor individuals who must settle outside the Montréal Metropolitan Community"
- Other experienced organizations
- Regular organizations "that only sponsor individuals who must settle outside the Montréal Metropolitan Community"
- Other regular organizations
- Groups of two to five individuals

On 27 January 2017, Quebec froze the intake of new private sponsorship applications until August 2018 due to the high number of applications already in the system, with the processing time for submitted applications between 8 and 18 months.

On 28 October 2020, Minister Nadine Girault issued a decision in the ministerial order published in the Gazette officielle du Québec (No. 44), announcing that the intake of 'undertaking applications' submitted by organizations of all categories would be suspended until 1 November 2021. Groups of two to five individuals, however, would be allowed to submit applications from 6 April 2021 to 5 May 2021. Among the eligible applications submitted, a maximum of 750 applications would be received by the Minister, "randomly drawn under the supervision of an outside auditor and in the presence of witnesses."

=== Special programs ===
The Joint Assistance Sponsorship (JAS) Program, which is only available for SAHs and their Constituent Groups, helps groups sponsor refugees with special needs. Through this program, the Government of Canada provides financial assistance for sponsors, who must support refugees for up to 24 months. In a few cases, the private sponsor may support refugees for up to 36 months. Special needs can include trauma from violence or torture; medical disabilities; the effects of systemic discrimination; or a large number of family members.

The Rainbow Refugees Assistance Partnership was announced in June 2019 by the Government of Canada, officially launching in 2020. The five-year partnership would assist private sponsors with the sponsorship of 50 LGBTI refugees per year.

== Response ==
=== Domestic response ===
The program has maintained popularity and public support despite portrayals by some of refugees as 'queue jumpers.' It has been argued that PSRs are more likely to successfully and quickly integrate than Government Assisted Refugees (GARs), in particular it has been praised for integrating refugees faster into the job market. It is further argued that the PSR Program should be seen as an example and opportunity for development in international refugee law to globally enable more refugees to access their entitled protection.

It is argued that private sponsorship is not a substitute for government sponsorship, but should be an addition in order to increase protection space—which will soon be the case in both Canada and the UK. There are concerns that the support of PSRs is overly dependent on a few individuals and organisations, and that it can be a lengthy process, with long waiting lists. In particular, the usage prima facie refugee status (rather than individual determination) has made the process easier and faster in some regions, but far longer for private sponsorship of non-Syrian refugees. Cultural differences have been argued to make the scheme itself challenging for participants, with differing expectations about behaviour, which has in some cases led to resentment between the refugees and sponsoring groups.

=== International response ===
Until recently, Canada was the only country to offer private refugee sponsorship. Since the launch of the Global Refugee Sponsorship Initiative, Canada has worked closely with six countries that have introduced or are piloting refugee sponsorship programs: United Kingdom (Community Sponsorship), Argentina, Ireland, Germany, Spain, and New Zealand. Australia, New Zealand, the Netherlands, and the UK have since worked on new private sponsorship programs for refugees.

The UK relaunched its sponsorship scheme in 2020, now counting all refugees in addition to those being resettled via different routes. The UK has also worked towards deepening its community sponsorship scheme, with £1 million being provided between 2017 and 2019 to train groups signing up to sponsorship.

For Australia, the senior staff of Settlement Services International (SSI) and Refugee Council of Australia (RCOA) met in Canada and Geneva in June 2017 to discuss the possibilities of adapting a private sponsorship scheme similar to that of Canada. As of 2022, the Community Refugee Sponsorship Initiative (CRSI) is a joint project of RCOA, Amnesty International Australia, Save the Children Australia, Welcome to Australia, Rural Australians for Refugees and the Australian Churches Refugee Taskforce.

In the Netherlands, Dutch human rights organization Justice and Peace Netherlands started a community sponsorship model called Samen Hier, inspired by the Canadian model though without its financial component. This project explicitly chose to avoid this component in order to avoid the risks that come with a financial relationship between refugees and host groups. Such risks include the development of an hierarchical relationship or a relationship where the refugee becomes increasingly dependent on the host group.

In New Zealand, a pilot of 25 Community Organisations Refugee Sponsorship (CORS) places was approved as part of the government's response to the 2015 crisis. This pilot has been completed and advocates are pushing for the pathway to be made permanent in the coming years. Prominent media commentator Alison Mau described the extension of the pilot as, politically "2019's most obvious no-brainer."
