= Killing of Nyah Mway =

2024 police shooting of a Southeast Asian teen in Utica, New York

Coordinates: 43°05′40″N 75°15′19″W

Nyah Mway
- Moments before Nyah Mway (right, legs outstretched) was fatally shot
- Born: August 8, 2010; Umpiem Mai Refugee Camp, Thailand
- Died: June 28, 2024 (aged 13); Utica, New York, U.S.
- Cause of death: Gunshot wound
- Education: Donovan Middle School

On the night of June 28, 2024, Nyah Mway (Burmese: ညမွှေး, pronounced [ˈɲa̼ m̥wèɪ]), a thirteen-year-old Southeast Asian American refugee, was shot and killed in Utica, New York, by Patrick Husnay, an officer of the Utica Police Department (UPD). After an investigation, the attorney general of New York declined to charge Husnay. Nyah Mway is thought to be the first Karen person killed in the United States by a police officer.

== Biography ==
Nyah Mway was born on August 8, 2010, in the Umpiem Mai Refugee Camp in Tak province, Thailand to Karen refugee parents from Myanmar. His family is from Myawaddy but lived in the camp for ten years, his parents having met there. He was the third of four siblings and was named by his grandfather, after the night-blooming jasmine. Nyah Mway's parents signed up for a United Nations refugee program to ensure a better future for their children.

The family settled in Utica in 2015. Utica is home to several refugee communities, including about 8,000 Karens. Nyah Mway's family is Buddhist, but he occasionally attended a Bible study group with friends. Because his father had lost a leg due to a land mine, Nyah Mway's older brothers earned most of the family's finances. According to his family, he had never been in trouble with law enforcement. Nyah Mway's mother described him as "obedient and respectful" and protective toward his younger sister. His brother said he spoke of wanting to finish school and become a doctor.

== Shooting ==
Nyah Mway had graduated from middle school earlier that week. He had told his mother that he was going out with his friends to get food. When they were stopped by police, he and a friend were returning home. Some sources state that he had gone to a graduation barbecue and/or a Bible study group.

A string of armed robberies had recently taken place in West Utica. Police described the suspects as Asian males with a black firearm. Around 10 pm, three officers patrolling the area stopped Nyah Mway and a friend, believing they fit the description. One officer asked to pat down Nyah Mway, who then tried to run away. In a statement, police said that he turned and flashed a weapon at them. Officer Bryce Patterson tackled him to the ground and began punching him. The other two officers followed behind. While he was pinned, Husnay fired a single shot into his chest. Another officer attempted to perform chest compressions until an ambulance arrived. Nyah Mway died at Wynn Hospital in Utica.

Police stated that they recovered a pellet gun replica of a Glock 17 handgun at the scene.

The three officers involved and their tenure with the UPD at the time are as follows:

- Patrick Husnay, six years
- Bryce Patterson, four years
- Andrew Citriniti, two and a half years

== Local aftermath ==
The officers involved were placed on indefinite paid leave, and investigations were launched by the New York State Attorney General’s Office and the Utica Police Department. A bystander video of the shooting circulated widely on social media, and the Attorney's General Officer released bodycam footage on July 30, 2024.

Public reaction included vigils, marches, and community meetings. A June 29 press conference by Mayor Mike Galime and Police Chief Mark Williams ended amid public anger, followed by a peaceful protest outside the police station. Galime’s subsequent appearance at a local church with a large Karen congregation drew further criticism. Demonstrations continued into early July, including a rally at City Hall and a march to the Utica State Office Building

A local leader said that in "war-torn" Myanmar, children were taught that "when you see the military or law enforcement, you run or you die", and suggested that could explain Nyah Mway's flight from the police. Another local Karen activist asked if they had "run from one persecutor to another".

On July 2, Mway’s family retained attorneys Julia P. Kuan and Earl S. Ward, who had previously represented the family of Tamir Rice. The city postponed its Independence Day fireworks, and Mway’s funeral was held on July 6.

Karen community leaders organized a march on July 13 with about 1,000 participants, presenting demands for accountability, an apology, compensation, and civilian oversight. Later that month, the Utica Police Department released an incident briefing video, which was criticized by the family’s attorneys and community activists as being biased for emphasizing unrelated robberies and attempting to justify the shooting while investigations were still ongoing.

Community members continued to press their demands at Common Council meetings in August and September. On September 17, Mway’s mother filed a notice of claim against the city, signaling plans for a potential lawsuit.

On April 2, 2025, the Attorney General’s Office concluded that no criminal charges would be filed against the officers. City officials expressed hope for community healing. As of May 2025, all three officers remained employed with the UPD. The family has indicated plans to pursue civil litigation. The family subsequently filed a federal civil rights lawsuit in connection with the shooting.

== Wider response ==
Karen-American organizations outside Utica released statements condemning the killing, with one describing it as an instance of police brutality and gun violence, and another as systemic racism within law enforcement. The Utica branch of the NAACP also expressed support for Nyah Mway's family and the local Karen community. Stop AAPI Hate posted on Twitter that they were "heartbroken" by the shooting, calling Nyah Mway "the latest victim of police violence against AA/PI communities" and calling for police accountability. Although Asians as a whole experience the lowest rates of fatal police violence among racial groups in the US, some Asian ethnic groups experience much higher rates.

The New York Times noted that, as is common in immigrant communities, activism for Nyah Mway was led by younger Karen activists in their teens and twenties who grew up in the United States and spoke English well. Meanwhile, older members of the community, who had lived through decades of violence in Myanmar, feared retribution for speaking out against city government. These older Karens supported the movement but played a less central role.

According to a CBS News report, more than 300 people had been shot and killed by police while holding replica guns between 2014 and 2024, of which 19 of those killed were minors. It also stated that police, lawmakers, and activists all struggled to deal with the issue of realistic replica guns.

== See also ==
- Killing of Angelo Quinto
- Killing of Christian Hall
- Killing of Yoshihiro Hattori
- Police brutality in the United States
- Lists of killings by law enforcement officers in the United States
- Police use of deadly force in the United States
