= Umpiem Mai Refugee Camp =

Karen refugee camp in Thailand

Umpiem Mai อุ้มเปี้ยมใหม่
- Refugee camp
- Location in Thailand
- Coordinates: 16.424351°N 99.004294°E
- Country: Thailand
- Province: Tak
- District: Phop Phra
- Sub-district: Khirirat

Area
  - Total: 79 ha (200 acres)

Population (2014)
  - Total: 12,900
  - Density: 16,000/km^{2} (42,000/sq mi)

Umpiem Mai (Thai: อุ้มเปี้ยมใหม่ also called Umphiem, Umphang and UMP) is a refugee camp in Thailand 12 km from the Myanmar border. It is situated on 79 hectares in the Khirirat Sub-district of Phop Phra District in Tak Province. In June 2014 it had a population of 12,900, predominantly Karen people fleeing conflict.

== Camp conditions ==
There are two sections in the camp. One side of the camp is called Zone A and the other is called Zone B. Each zone has its own district numbers and house numbers. Every month each section or zone has to pick up foods from the office where the authorities put it in a huge hall. The "Camp residents receive monthly rations provided by a group of non-governmental organizations known as the Thai-Burma Border Consortium (TBBC). The standard group of rations consists of rice, charcoal, cooking oil, yellow bean and fortified flour." The authorities give out foods by family size.

Water, electricity, mobile phone and internet service are all available in the camp.

In 2012 a fire destroyed one third of the camp — 1,000 houses, three mosques and two nursery schools.

== Landscape ==
Umphium Mai is mostly hilly. It was “initially a harsh environment with little tree cover, torrential rain and a cold climate (the altitude is over 1,200 meters). The camp is situated on very hilly terrain and there was a significant danger from soil erosion particularly during the rainy season." However, Umphium Mai is a safe place when it comes to bad weather. It tends not to be hit by earthquakes or floods. The place has jungle-like terrain; Umphium Mai was in the middle of two mountains and the mountains cover the place side by side. Spring and summer are the most dangerous seasons in the camp. When it comes to spring, it is rainy and people often have difficulty walking because of the mud. When it comes to summer, the place becomes dry and dehydrated. People have a hard time finding water to survive. The place sometimes becomes so dry that people fight over water.

Umphium Mai also has exquisite scenery, most noticeably the Thi Lo Su Waterfall, which is possibly the largest and highest waterfall in Thailand. The waterfall is open from December until April each year.

== Notable people ==
- Kler Heh, professional footballer.
- Nyah Mway, killed by police in the US at the age of 13
