= Citizens UK =

UK broad-based community organising alliance

- Formation: 1989; 37 years ago
- Founder: Neil Jameson
- Founded at: East London
- Registration no.: 1107264
- Headquarters: Jacquard Point 1 and 3, Tapestry Way, London, E1 2FJ
- Location: London, United Kingdom
- Coordinates: 51.5186629°N 0.0592789°W
- Executive Director: Matthew Bolton
- Subsidiaries: Living Wage Foundation
- Revenue: £10,640,329 GBP (2023)
- Expenses: £9,674,001 GBP (2023)
- Staff: 142 (2023)
- Volunteers: 9,000 (2023)
- Website: https://www.citizensuk.org/
- Formerly called: Citizens Organising Foundation

Citizens UK is a grassroots alliance of local communities working together in England and Wales.

The organisation has 18 chapters across England and one in Wales. These are made up of local institutions, including schools, universities, churches, mosques, synagogues, parent groups, health trusts, charities, and unions. They also support a Guild of Community Organisers and the Centre for Civil Society.

They have worked on several campaigns, including building up over £2 billion of wages through the UK Living Wage campaign, winning a legal cap on the cost of credit, and ending the detention of children for immigration purposes. They have previously campaigned in areas including the Living Wage Foundation, Parents and Communities Together (PACT), and Sponsor Refugees. In 2023, campaigns include Climate Change, Homelessness, Housing, anti-Misogyny and school-based counselling.

In September 2018, Matthew Bolton became the new Executive Director of Citizens UK.

== History ==
Citizens UK was formed in 1989 by Neil Jameson and was originally known as the Citizens Organising Foundation (COF). Jameson was the Executive Director of the organisation until 2018.

The first branch of Citizens UK was in East London. This was an alliance of organisations in Dagenham, Hackney, Newham, Redridge and Tower Hamlets. They became known as The East London Communities Organisation (TELCO). Other branches followed throughout London.

In 2001, TELCO launched the real Living Wage campaign. Members from schools, mosques, churches and other local civil society institutions came together to discuss issues in their local community. Low pay was one of the key issues that consistently came up. At the time, the London minimum wage was £3.70 an hour which meant some people were working multiple jobs and still struggling to make ends meet. Leaders organised rallies, charity music gigs and actions calling for employers to pay all staff and contracted staff a real Living Wage. A march down the Mile End road was organised calling for all staff working in East London hospitals to be a paid a Living Wage. These hospitals were among the first employers to join the movement, followed by local schools and big City firms.

The campaign has since won over £2 billion of additional wages, lifting over 430,000 people out of working poverty.

In 2005, the organisation opened an office in Birmingham.

The organisation came to national prominence during the 2010 United Kingdom general election when the leaders of the UK's three largest political parties all addressed a large meeting of its members in what it billed as the "fourth debate", in reference to the three TV debates. Each candidate for Prime Minister was questioned on stage concerning their willingness to work with Citizens UK if elected. Each undertook to work with Citizens UK and come to future assemblies to give account of work achieved. In particular they agreed to work to introduce the Living Wage and to end the practice of holding children of refugee families in detention.

The youngest branch of Citizens UK is in Peterborough.

== Political philosophy ==
Citizens UK works to build permanent alliances of citizens to exercise power in society. It sees its role in the UK's political system as determinant of the distinction between Civil Society on the one hand and the State and the Market on the other. Community organising and the role of the professional Community Organiser is seen as working out how to take back power from the State and the Market by holding them accountable. In a democratic society there is a need for a genuine public discourse concerning justice and the common good.

== London Citizens ==
London Citizens is the largest civil alliance in the Citizens UK network. The oldest of the four London chapters is The East London Communities Organisation, better known as "TELCO", formed in 1996 at a founding assembly gathering over 1,300 people from 30 different institutions. The other London Chapters are South London Citizens (2004), West London Citizens (2005), and North London Citizens (2011).

London Citizens' most high-profile campaigns included those to establish a London living wage, an urban Community Land Trust and CitySafe havens in high streets as a way of tackling knife crime and street violence.

London Citizens has in its four chapters over 240 organisations in membership. In local neighbourhoods small actions are undertaken such as those to prevent a factory from contaminating the area with noxious smells, stopping drug dealing in school neighbourhoods and getting safe road crossings established. Over time larger campaigns were undertaken. Before Mayoral elections for the Greater London Authority in 2000, 2004 and 2008 major Accountability Assemblies were held with the main mayoral candidates. They were asked to support London Citizens and work with them on issues such as London Living Wage; an amnesty for undocumented migrants; safer cities initiatives and development of community land trust housing. South London Citizens held a citizens enquiry into the working of the Home Office department at Lunar House and its impact on the lives of refugees and migrants. This resulted in the building of a new visitor centre at Lunar House in Croydon.

== Campaigns ==
=== Strangers into Citizens ===
Strangers into Citizens was a political advocacy campaign by London Citizens which ran from February 2007 to May 2010. The campaign called for undocumented migrants in the United Kingdom to receive a work permit if they had been resident for four years. The campaign became definitively and formally defunct in the year 2013.

The campaign was organised by Austen Ivereigh, a former director of public affairs for the Archbishop of Westminster, Cardinal Cormac Murphy-O'Connor, and as such had strong links with amongst others the Cardinal Archbishop, Westminster Cathedral, the Catholic Bishops' Conference of England and Wales and the Catholic Herald newspaper, all three being enthusiastic supporters of the political advocacy campaign.

The campaign attempted to influence the policies of the political parties and candidates in both the 2008 London mayoral election and the 2010 general election. During the London mayoral election, the campaign was supportively endorsed by the Liberal Democrats and, in their personal capacity, by Ken Livingstone and Boris Johnson, the Labour and Conservative candidates for the Mayoralty of London respectively.

=== Living Wage Foundation ===
Launched in 2001, the Living Wage campaign calls for every worker in the country to earn enough to provide their family with the essentials of life. As a result of the campaign's success, other cities began to adopt the campaign and Citizens UK set up the Living Wage Foundation (LWF) in 2011 to provide companies with intelligence and accreditation.

Rates are independently calculated every year to meet the real cost of living with an hourly London rate and another rate for the UK, outside London. In the capital it is set by the Greater London Authority. The rate outside London is calculated by the Minimum Income Standard team at Loughborough University, supported by the Joseph Rowntree Foundation. Since launching the campaign has accredited 12,000 employers to pay the living wage and has won over £2 billion of additional wages, lifting over 430,000 people out of working poverty.

=== People's Olympic Legacy ===
When it was announced that London would bid to be the host city for the 2012 Olympic Games, Citizens lobbied to gain a lasting legacy for Londoners from the billions of pound to be spent. Following on from hundreds of one-to-one meetings and a listening campaign across member institutions, in 2004 London Citizens signed an agreement with the London 2012 bid team, which specified what the people of East London could expect in return for their support in hosting the Olympic Games. The People's Promises, as they are known, had the following demands:

1. Permanently affordable homes for local people.
2. Money from the Olympic development to be set aside to improve local schools and the health service.
3. The University of East London to be main higher education beneficiary of the sports legacy and to consider becoming a Sports Centre of Excellence.
4. At least £2m set aside for a Construction Academy.
5. At least 30% of jobs set aside for local people.
6. That the Lower Lea Valley is designated a 'Living Wage Zone' and all jobs guaranteed a living wage.

In 2023, the demands have yet to be met.

=== Independent Asylum Commission ===
Citizens UK set up the Independent Asylum Commission to investigate widespread concern about the way refugees and asylum seekers were being treated by the UK Borders Agency. The report made a series of over 200 recommendations for change which are still being negotiated. In the lead up to the 2010 General Election a major campaign was mounted over the number of children being held in detention with their families seeking refugee status. Over 1,000 children were being detained annually. Promises to end this practice were made by all three political leaders at the General Election Accountability Assembly held by Citizens UK in May 2010 at Westminster Central Hall. This resulted in the ending of the practice of holding children of refugee families in detention by the Coalition government and a law was passed in 2014 to prohibit this.

=== Sponsor Refugees & Community Sponsorship scheme ===
At the height of the Syrian refugee crisis in September 2015, Citizens UK called for the introduction of sponsorship of refugees based on the Canadian model of community sponsorship. This was launched in July 2016. Citizens UK Foundation for Community Sponsorship of Refugees (Sponsor Refugees) was established in October 2017.

In 2022, Citizens UK started the Communities for Ukraine scheme in response to the humanitarian crisis caused by the Russian invasion of Ukraine. As of February 2023, the scheme had resettled more than 700 Ukrainian refugees in the UK.

=== Institute for Community Organising ===
Citizens UK set up the Institute for Community Organising (ICO) as part of its Centre for Civil Society (established in 2010) in response to growing demands for its training. The ICO is the first operating division of the Centre and was established to offer a series of training opportunities for those who wish to make community organising a full or part-time career and also for Community Leaders who wish to learn the broad philosophy and skills of community organising and who are in a position to put them into practice in their institutions and neighbourhoods. The Institute provides training and consultancy on a commercial basis to other agencies which wish to employ the skills and techniques of community organising in their institutions. The ICO has an Academic Advisory Board and an International Professional Advisory Body drawn from the global network of Community Organising Institutes in the UK (Citizens UK), USA (Industrial Areas Foundation) and Germany (DICO).

== Training ==
In 2013, Citizens UK created a Master's course in Community Organising in affiliation with Queen Mary University.

In 2023, the organisation runs online and in-person training courses. Several of these are in partnership with Newman University, Birmingham.
