= Refugee Council of Australia =

Australian non-profit organisation

- Formation: 1981
- Headquarters: New South Wales
- CEO: Paul Power
- President: Jasmina Bajraktarevic-Hayward
- Chair: Maya Cranitch
- Website: www.refugeecouncil.org.au

The Refugee Council of Australia (RCOA) is New South Wales-based umbrella not-for-profit for organisations that support and advocate for refugees and asylum seekers. As of 2022 the president of RCOA is Jasmina Bajraktarevic-Hayward, the chair is Maya Cranitch and the CEO Paul Power.

== History ==
The organisation was founded in November 1981 by Major-General Paul Cullen AC, CBE, DSO & Bar, ED, soon after he had been awarded the Nansen Medal by the UNHCR for his support of refugees through Austcare and Australian Jewish community organisations. The foundation meeting was held on 19 November 1981 at the Australian Council of Churches (ACC) in Clarence Street, Sydney. Cullen was the first president, and other board members were Rev. Martin Chittleborough of the ACC (chair); Rex Hubbard of Save the Children Australia (vice-chair); Michael Carroll of Austcare (secretary/treasurer); Roger Walker of World Vision, Sid Bartsch of Lutheran World Federation and Ted Bacon of St Vincent de Paul Society. A public meeting was held the following day and the constitution ratified. There was liaison with the Regional Representative of UNHCR, Hugo Idoyaga, and Canberra Times editor Ian Mathews donated the newspaper's share of the UN Association of Australia Media Peace Award as the first donation to the Council.

Upon request by the minister, on 25 November 1981 four members of the Council met the Minister for Immigration and Ethnic Affairs, Ian Macphee, the first of many meetings with government.

A full-time secretariat was created in March 1985, and an executive officer (Luke Hardy) was appointed, with the position renamed executive director the following year, and Chief Executive Officer in 2006. Margaret Piper held the position from 1991 to 2005, with Paul Power taking over in 2006. The secretariat was first based at Austcare's Sydney office, later moving to its own offices in Glebe in 1999, which relocated to Surry Hills in 2006.

RCOA was registered with the Australian Charities and Not-for-profits Commission in 2000.

It received some funding from the Commonwealth Government until May 2014, when the Abbott government cut off funding to the organisation entirely. At the time, then Immigration Minister Scott Morrison said "It's not the government's view that taxpayers' funding should be there to support what is effectively an advocacy group". The move was condemned by the Australian Council of Social Service and others.

== Governance and funding ==
RCOA is a not-for-profit non-governmental national organisation. Its funding comes from donations by the public and grants from government agencies and philanthropic bodies. It acts as an umbrella body for organisations working with and for refugees and asylum seekers.

As of 2022 the President of RCOA is Jasmina Bajraktarevic-Hayward (since 2021); the chair is Maya Cranitch AM (since 2019); and the organisation is led by CEO Paul Power (since 2006).

As of 2017 it had 190 institutional and 1,000 individual members.

== Activities ==
The Refugee Council of Australia advocates for refugee rights, including criticising level of support that the Australian Government provides to job-seeking refugees.

Its 2010 publication What Works documented refugees' experiences and the challenges they faced while trying to enter the Australian employment market.

In 2021, it was part of international efforts to resettle 152 refugees from immigration detention in Australia to Canada.

The Refugee Council of Australia has made submissions to the Australian Human Rights Commission about children in detention, and its papers have also been used and cited by the United Nations High Commissioner for Refugees.

It publishes key statistics about refugees in Australia and around the world on its website, and the results of its research are used by other organisation, such as the Kaldor Centre. It also publishes extensive resources for asylum seekers and refugees and their supporters on its website.

In June 2025 the RCOA sent a letter to the Australian Ministers for Home Affairs and Foreign Affairs enquiring about government plans to support refugees holding Australian Humanitarian visas who are unable to depart Iran due to escalating conflict. The RCOA asked that said refugees be included in evacuation plans.

== Community Refugee Sponsorship Initiative ==
The Community Refugee Sponsorship Initiative (CRSI) is a joint project of RCOA, Amnesty International Australia, Save the Children Australia, Welcome to Australia, Rural Australians for Refugees and the Australian Churches Refugee Taskforce. It is based on other initiatives around the world (notably Canada's Private Sponsorship of Refugees Program), whereby ordinary people or community groups in Australia create and pool funds and resources in order to support a refugee or refugee family to settle within the local community.

== Past office-bearers ==
- David Lee Bitel, a prominent Sydney lawyer, was president of RCOA from 1995 to 2006.
- Phil Glendenning AM, co-founder of Australians for Native Title and Reconciliation (ANTaR) in 1997 and director of the Edmund Rice Centre since 1996, was president of RCOA from 2012 to 2021, and was awarded life membership in 2021.
