= Gateway Protection Programme =

British governmental refugee resettlement scheme

The Gateway Protection Programme was a refugee resettlement scheme operated by the Government of the United Kingdom in partnership with the United Nations High Commissioner for Refugees (UNHCR) and co-funded by the European Union (EU), offering a legal route for a quota of UNHCR-identified refugees to be resettled in the UK. Following a proposal by the British Home Secretary, David Blunkett, in October 2001, the legal basis was established by the Nationality, Immigration and Asylum Act 2002 and the programme itself launched in March 2004. The programme enjoyed broad support from the UK's main political parties.

The Gateway Protection Programme initially had a quota of 500 refugees per year, which was later increased to 750, but the actual number of refugees resettled in most years was fewer than the quota permitted. Afghan, Liberian, Congolese, Sudanese, Burmese, Ethiopian, Mauritanian, Iraqi, Bhutanese, Eritrean, Palestinian and Somali refugees were amongst those who were resettled under the programme. Refugees were resettled to locations in England and Scotland. Of the 18 local authorities participating as resettlement locations by 2012, eight were in the North West region of England and three in Yorkshire and the Humber. Evaluations of the programme have praised it as having a positive impact on the reception of refugees by local communities, but have also noted the difficulties these refugees have faced in securing employment.

In 2019, the British government announced plans to merge the Gateway Protection Programme with two of the UK's other resettlement schemes to create a new, single resettlement scheme. This was delayed due to the COVID-19 pandemic. In March 2020, the Gateway Protection Programme closed after resettling 9,939 refugees since it began in 2004. The new, replacement UK Resettlement Scheme started in February 2021.

== Details ==
The programme was the UK's "quota refugee" resettlement scheme. Refugees designated as particularly vulnerable by the UNHCR were assessed by the Home Office for eligibility under the 1951 Convention Relating to the Status of Refugees. If they met the eligibility criteria, they were brought to the UK and granted indefinite leave to remain. The International Organization for Migration (IOM) assisted the process by facilitating pre-departure medical screening, counselling, dossier preparation, transport and immediate arrival assistance. Once in the UK, refugees were entered into a 12-month support programme intended to aid their integration. The programme involved local authorities and NGOs including the British Red Cross, the International Rescue Committee, Migrant Helpline, Refugee Action, the Refugee Arrivals Project, the Refugee Council, Scottish Refugee Council and Refugee Support. These organisations formed the Resettlement Inter-Agency Partnership at the planning stage of the programme, in order to pool their resources and form a partnership for the delivery of services to the resettled refugees.

The programme was distinct from, and in addition to, ordinary provisions for claiming asylum in the United Kingdom. The Gateway Protection Programme was co-funded by the European Union, first through the European Refugee Fund and then through its successor, the Asylum, Migration and Integration Fund (AMIF). Over the period 2009–14, the Home Office provided £29.97 million in funding and the EU £18.67 million. Anna Musgrave of the Refugee Council argued in 2014 that the programme "is rarely talked about and the Home Office, in the main, stay fairly quiet about it."

== History ==
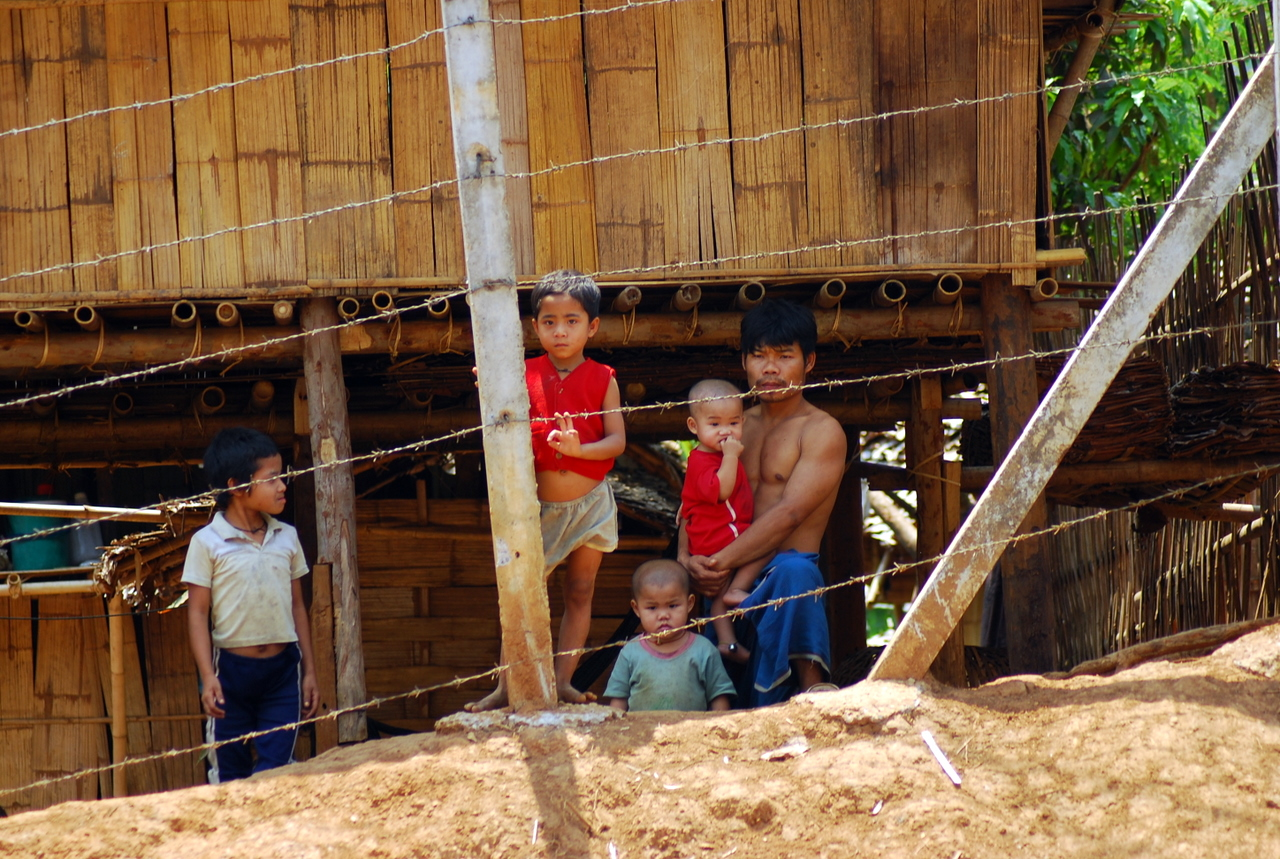
Burmese refugees in Thailand's Mae La camp, which works with UNHCR

The Gateway Protection Programme was not the first British refugee resettlement programme. Other, informal resettlement programmes have included the Mandate Refugee Scheme, and the UK has also participated in the Ten or More Plan. The former is for so-called "mandate" refugees who have been granted refugee status by UNHCR in third countries. To qualify for the scheme, refugees must have close ties to the UK and it must also be demonstrated that the UK is the most appropriate country for their resettlement. The Ten or More Plan, established by UNHCR in 1973 and administered in the UK by the British Red Cross, is for refugees requiring medical attention not available in their current location. During the 1990s, 2,620 refugees were settled in the UK through these two programmes. In 2003, the UK's Ten or More Plan had a resettlement goal of 10 people and the Mandate Refugee Scheme 300. Refugees have also been resettled through specific programmes following emergencies, including 42,000 Ugandan Asians expelled from Uganda during 1972–74, 22,500 Vietnamese during 1979–92, over 2,500 Bosnians in the 1990s, and over 4,000 Kosovars in 1999.

A new resettlement programme was proposed by the British Home Secretary, David Blunkett in October 2001, having been hinted at by the previous Home Secretary, Jack Straw, in a speech to the European Conference on Asylum in Lisbon in June 2000. The legal basis for the programme's funding was established by Section 59 of the Nationality, Immigration and Asylum Act 2002. This act was passed by the House of Commons by 362 votes to 74 in June 2002 and by the House of Lords – at the ninth attempt, following concern about the introduction of measures allowing for the detention of asylum seekers in rural areas – in November 2002.

Year	Quota	Refugees resettled
2004	500	150
2005	500	71
2006	500	353
2007	500	463
2008	750	642
2009	750	857
2010	750	666
2011	750	432
2012	750	995
2013	750	937
2014	750	630
2015	750	652
2016	750	804
2017	750	813
2018	750	693
2019	750	704
2020	750	77
Total		9,939

The Gateway Protection Programme was subsequently established in March 2004, with the first refugees arriving in the UK on 19 March. Initially, the programme quota was set at 500 per year. The British government had faced criticism from academics and practitioners over the small number of refugees it has resettled in comparison with other developed states. For example, in 2001 the countries with the largest quota schemes were the United States (80,000 refugees), Canada (11,000) and Australia (10,000). Initially, David Blunkett had intended to raise the quota to 1,000 in the second year of the programme's operation, but local councils' reluctance to participate in the scheme meant that it was slow to take off. It has been argued that their reluctance showed that hostile attitudes towards asylum seekers had carried over to affect the most genuinely needy refugees. The quota remained at 500 per year until the 2008/09 financial year, when it was increased to 750 refugees per year. The number of refugees resettled under the scheme was small in comparison to the number of asylum seekers offered protection in the UK. For example, in 2013, 17,647 initial decisions on asylum claims were made by the Home Office, of which 5,734 (32.5 per cent) determined the applicant to be a refugee and granted them asylum, 53 (0.3 per cent) granted humanitarian protection and 540 (3.1 per cent) granted discretionary leave. 11,105 applications (62.9 per cent) were refused. Worldwide, there were 51.2 million forcibly displaced people at the end of 2013, 16.7 million of whom were refugees.

The programme was supported by the main British political parties at the national level since its inception, and there was also support from councillors from each of the main parties at the local authority level. On the occasion of the tenth anniversary of the scheme in 2014, refugee groups and others praised it as a successful programme and called for it to be expanded, particularly in light of the Syrian refugee crisis. In early 2014, Amnesty International and the Refugee Council campaigned for the government to offer resettlement or humanitarian protection to Syrian refugees above and beyond the Gateway quota of 750 per year, "to ensure that resettlement opportunities continue to be available to refugees from the rest of the world". The anniversary of the programme was also the occasion of further criticism of the 750 quota, with some commentators arguing that this was mean-spirited and continued to compare unfavourably with the refugee resettlement programmes of states including the United States, Canada and Australia. Others, such as academic Jonathan Darling, were more skeptical about expanding the scheme, for fear that any such a move would be accompanied by greater restrictions on the ability of people to claim asylum in the UK. He argues that "we must be critical of any attempts to expand such a quota-based scheme at the expense of a more progressive asylum system". Furthermore, he argues that the "hospitality" of the scheme was highly conditional and can be viewed as a form of "compassionate repression", with the UNHCR, the Home Office and local authorities all involved in "sorting, decision, and consideration over which individuals are the 'exceptional cases'", to the exclusion of others.

In September 2015, in the context of the European migrant crisis, Labour Party leadership candidate Yvette Cooper called for an increase in the number of refugees resettled in the UK to 10,000. The prime minister, David Cameron, subsequently announced that the UK would resettle 20,000 refugees from camps in countries bordering Syria over the period to 2020 under the Vulnerable Persons Resettlement Scheme, which was established in early 2014 and was distinct from, but modelled on, the Gateway Protection Programme.

On 17 June 2019, the British Home Secretary, Sajid Javid, announced that a new resettlement scheme would be introduced from 2020, bringing the Vulnerable Persons Resettlement Scheme, the Vulnerable Children's Resettlement Scheme and the Gateway Protection Programme into a single programme with an initial quota of 5,000 people. The government stated that "the new programme will be simpler to operate and provide greater consistency in the way that the UK government resettles refugees". The COVID-19 pandemic delayed the launch of the new resettlement scheme, with the individual schemes it was intended to replace being placed on hold in March 2020 and limited resettlement under the Vulnerable Persons Resettlement Scheme only resuming in late 2020. A January 2021 parliamentary briefing explained that since the pandemic, "there has been uncertainty over the Government's plans to launch the [UK Resettlement Scheme], and it is unclear whether the previous ambition to resettle 5,000 refugees in the first year of operation still stands". Government ministers confirmed that they still intended to launch a new programme, however. The new UK Resettlement Scheme started in February 2021.

== Refugees resettled ==
	Refugees resettled		
Nationality	2004–2012	2013–2017	2018–2020
Afghan		7	187
Bhutanese	257	101	
Burmese	460		
Burundian		6	3
Cameroonian			1
Congolese (DRC)	1,038	1,043	325
Djiboutian		1	
Eritrean	8	67	124
Ethiopian	897	440	43
Iraqi	1,116	524	81
Liberian	118		
Mauritanian	53		
Pakistani			48
Palestinian	81		158
Rwandan		2	1
Sierra Leonean	4		4
Somali	418	1,095	343
South Sudanese		64	12
Sudanese	172	472	100
Syrian		1	
Ugandan		2	20
Yemeni		6	
Other/unknown/stateless/refugee		3	24
Total	4,622	3,834	1,474

The number of refugees resettled under the programme was below the quota in every year except for 2009, 2012, 2013, 2016 and 2017. Refugees resettled included Liberians from Guinea and Sierra Leone, Congolese (DRC) from Uganda and Zambia, Sudanese from Uganda, Burmese (including Karen, Mon, Pa'O and Rohingya people) from Thailand, Ethiopians from Kenya, and Mauritanians from Senegal. Provision was made for 1,000 Iraqi refugees to be resettled in the UK between 1 April 2008 and the end of March 2010. In 2008, 236 Iraqis were resettled and as of 18 May, a further 212 had been resettled in 2009. However, in May 2009 the programme was shut down for those Iraqis resettling due to having worked in support of British occupying forces and therefore at risk for reprisals. This decision was criticised as premature and "mean-spirited" by some members of Parliament. Nonetheless, other Iraqis continued to be resettled under the Gateway Protection Programme and between 2004 and 2017, a total of 1,640 Iraqis were resettled as part of the programme. Other nationalities of refugees resettled under the scheme included Bhutanese, Eritreans, Palestinians, Sierra Leoneans and Somalis.

== Resettlement locations ==
In March 2009, out of the 434 local authorities in the UK, 15 were participating in the programme. By 2012, a total of 18 local authorities had participated. In a review of the scheme, academics Duncan Sim and Kait Laughlin noted that "it is clear that, as with asylum seekers dispersed by the UK Borders Agency under Home Office dispersal policy, most refugees have been resettled away from London and south east England, a policy which may lead to separation of extended families". Of the 18 local authorities, eight were in North West England and three in Yorkshire and the Humber.

The first refugees resettled under the programme were housed in Sheffield, which was the first city to join the scheme and which had branded itself the UK's first 'City of Sanctuary'. Others were housed in cities and towns including Bradford, Brighton and Hove, Bromley, Colchester, Hull, Middlesbrough, Motherwell, Norwich, and the Manchester area including Bolton, Bury, Oldham, Rochdale, Salford, Stockport and Tameside. Sheffield, Bolton and Hull received the largest numbers, accounting for just under half of all refugees resettled under the programme between 2004 and 2012. The large proportion of refugees who were resettled in North West England has been attributed partly to strong leadership on migration issues in Greater Manchester.

In 2007, North Lanarkshire Council won the "Creating Integrated Communities" category in the UK Housing Awards for its involvement in the Gateway Protection Programme. Research with Congolese refugees settled with North Lanarkshire Council in Motherwell found that the majority wanted to stay in the town and that they viewed it positively both as a location in its own right, and in comparison with other resettlement locations.

In April 2007, Bolton Museum held an exhibition of photos of Sudanese refugees resettled in the town under the programme. A film, titled Moving to Mars was made about two ethnic Karen families resettled from Burma to Sheffield under the Gateway Protection Programme. The film opened the Sheffield International Documentary Festival in November 2009 and was aired on the television channel More4 on 2 February 2010. One ethnic Karen refugee resettled with his family in Sheffield in 2006, Kler Heh, signed a professional contract to play football for Sheffield United F.C. in March 2015.

On 17 July 2009, three Congolese men resettled in Norwich under the programme were killed in a car crash on the A1 road. The Home Office released a promotional video in October 2009 that highlighted the success of the programme in resettling the first 15 Congolese families in Norwich in 2006. In 2011, the Home Office stopped using Norwich as a resettlement location in favour of locations in Yorkshire and Lancashire, reportedly to the disappointment of the local council.

== Evaluations ==
Resettlement has been presented as a means of the UK fulfilling its obligations towards displaced people in the context of hostile public attitudes towards asylum seekers. Research has shown that members of the British public are generally well disposed to providing protection to genuine refugees, but are skeptical about the validity of asylum seekers' claims. A report published in 2005 states that "some participating agencies have been reluctant to pursue a proactive media strategy due to local political considerations and issues relating to the dispersal of asylum seekers". However, in February 2006, the Parliamentary Under-Secretary of State for the Home Department Andy Burnham, when asked about how the programme fitted in with community cohesion strategies, stated in the House of Commons that:

"The early evidence from areas in which authorities have participated in the programme shows that it has been successful in challenging some of the attacks on the notion of political asylum that we have heard in recent years. In Bolton and Sheffield in particular, the towns have rallied around the individuals who have come to them. The programme has been a positive experience for the receiving community and, of course, for the vulnerable individuals who have benefited from the protection that those towns have offered".

A report into the experience of refugees resettled in Brighton and Hove under the scheme between October 2006 and October 2007 was published by the Sussex Centre for Migration Research at the University of Sussex in December 2007. The report found that the refugees had struggled to gain employment and English language skills. Another evaluation report undertaken for the Home Office and published in 2011 also found that only small numbers of resettled refugees were in paid employment, noting that many were still more concerned about meeting their basic needs.

In February 2009, the Home Office published a report evaluating the effectiveness of the Gateway Protection Programme. The research it was based upon focused on refugees' integration into British society in the 18 months following their resettlement. The research found that refugees showed signs of integration, including the formation of social bonds through community groups and places of worship. The report noted that low employment rates and slow progress with acquiring English language skills were particular concerns. Younger refugees and children had made the most progress. No specific language lessons were provided under the Gateway Protection Programme. Instead, Gateway refugees who required help with their English language skills had been provided with access to mainstream English for Speakers of Other Languages (ESOL) courses, which were run by a range of state, voluntary and community-based organisations. However, the International Catholic Migration Commission (ICMC) Europe reported that in Sheffield, it could be difficult for resettled refugees to gain access to ESOL classes because demand generally exceeded supply – a situation also noted by an evaluation of the scheme's operation in Motherwell undertaken in 2013. The Motherwell evaluation found that most of the male refugees were in employment, but that many of them were not in jobs that allowed them to use their skills. The majority of women were not in work, reflecting a lack of job opportunities but also a lack of childcare provision.

A number of programme evaluations have found that many resettled refugees have been the victims of verbal or physical attacks in the UK. The Home Office's 2009 evaluation noted that between one-quarter and half of each of four groups of Liberian and Congolese refugees resettled under the programme had suffered verbal or physical harassment. An evaluation undertaken by academics at Sheffield Hallam University for the Home Office in 2011 found that one-fifth of the refugees surveyed for the evaluation (who had been in the UK for a year) had been the victims of verbal or physical attacks in their first six months in the UK, and just over a fifth had been attacked in the second six months of their resettlement. Many of the victims of this abuse had not reported it to the authorities, and the authors of the evaluation suggested that this was a reason why there was a gap between the perceptions of refugees and service providers, who generally suggested that community relations were good. Verbal and physical attacks against refugees were also noted in the 2013 Motherwell evaluation.

== See also ==
- Modern immigration to the United Kingdom
- Third country resettlement
