= Syrian Vulnerable Person Resettlement Programme =

The Syrian Vulnerable Person Resettlement Programme, sometimes referred to as a Relocation Scheme, is a programme of the United Kingdom government that plans to resettle 20,000 Syrian refugees from refugee camps in Jordan, Lebanon, Iraq, Egypt and Turkey over the period from September 2015 to May 2020. It was first announced in January 2014 and in September 2015 the expansion to 20,000 refugees was made. It is run in partnership between the UK Home Office, the Department for International Development, the Ministry of Housing, Communities and Local Government and NGOs such as Refugee Action. Only 2,659 Syrian refugees were resettled through the programme by the end of June 2016. The National Audit Office estimated the Programme's cost at £1,112 million. Syrians are only granted 5 years humanitarian protection and not indefinite leave to remain.

In September 2018, following a changing military situation in north-west Syria and the ending of UK funded projects in the area, the government announced some former White Helmets (Syria Civil Defence) members would be included in the scheme, and resettled in Britain.

On 17 June 2019, the British Home Secretary, Sajid Javid, announced that from 2020, a new resettlement scheme would be introduced, bringing the Vulnerable Persons Resettlement Scheme, the Vulnerable Children's Resettlement Scheme and the Gateway Protection Programme into a single programme with an initial quota of 5,000 people. The government stated that "the new programme will be simpler to operate and provide greater consistency in the way that the UK government resettles refugees". The start of the UK's new resettlement scheme in 2020 will also see all those arriving to the UK via Community Sponsorship counted in addition to the government's own resettlement targets. The new UK Resettlement Scheme started in February 2021.

The programme's budget from 1 January 2015 to the end of 2020 was £177.6 million.

== See also ==
- Syrian Civil War
- Conflict, Stability and Security Fund
- Almondbury Community School bullying incident
