= Third-country resettlement =

Refugee resettlement outside of home country

Third-country resettlement, or refugee resettlement, is, according to the UNHCR, one of three durable solutions (voluntary repatriation and local integration being the other two) for refugees who fled their home country. Resettled refugees have the right to reside long-term or permanently in the country of resettlement and may also have the right to become citizens of that country.

Resettled refugees may also be referred to as quota or contingent refugees, as countries only take a certain number of refugees each year. In 2016 there were 65.6 million forcibly displaced people worldwide and around 190,000 of them were resettled into a third country. Canada leads the world in refugee resettlement; it resettled more than 47,600 individuals in 2022. The United States led the world in refugee resettlement for decades till 2018.

== History of resettlement ==
- The International Refugee Organization resettled over 1 million refugees between 1947 and 1951. They were scattered throughout Europe after World War II. (Most of the German refugees were incorporated into West and East Germany). 80% of them were resettled outside Europe. An example for those resettled within Europe are the 150,000 Polish soldiers and their families who were resettled in the UK by 1949; most feared retribution from the Soviet authorities.
- Due to the Soviet invasion of Hungary in 1956, 200,000 Hungarians fled to Yugoslavia and Austria. Nearly all 180,000 Hungarians who fled to Austria were resettled to 37 third countries within three years. The Soviet invasion of Czechoslovakia in 1968 had the same effect; many Czechoslovaks fled their country and were subsequently resettled.
- Most of its Asian minority were expelled from Uganda in 1972 and some 40,000 Ugandan Asians were resettled in third countries.
- Following a coup d’état in Chile in 1973, 5,000 refugees from neighbouring countries were resettled.
- 650,000 Vietnamese refugees were resettled in the United States during and after the Vietnam War.
- Between April 1992 and June 1997, following the first Gulf War, approximately 21,800 Iraqis were accepted for resettlement from Saudi Arabia.
- In the context of the breakup of Yugoslavia, between 1992 and July 1993 over 11,000 inmates from places of detention in Bosnia and Herzegovina had left for third countries. By June 1997, UNHCR had been directly involved in resettling some 47,000 refugees from former Yugoslavia.
- More than 100,000 refugees from Myanmar have been resettled from the refugee camps in Thailand since 2004 and as many people have been resettled from Malaysia during this same period.
- 600,000 Yemenis have been resettled from their homeland in Yemen to third countries since 2014 following a conflict against Houthi rebels.

== Stages of the resettlement journey ==
There are three stages of the resettlement journey: Pre-departure happens from their country of origin, departure is the during the process of resettlement and post-arrival happens in their new country.

=== Pre-departure ===
==== Selection according to vulnerability ====
Precondition for resettlement is to be registered as a refugee with the UNHCR or the host State and to have undergone the Refugee Status Determination (RSD) process based on the 1951 Refugee Convention refugee definition. Among those refugees the UNHCR or other organisations (e.g. RefugePoint or HIAS) make referrals for resettlement if they identify a high level of risk and vulnerability whilst being in the first country of asylum. Refugees cannot apply for resettlement themselves. Selection procedures can vary between UNHCR offices but the below criteria are generally used:

- Physical safety and legal rights are at risk in country of asylum
- Past experience of violence and torture
- Significant medical needs that cannot be provided for in country of asylum
- Sex/gender based risks in country of asylum
- Children and adolescents are at risk in country of asylum
- Resettlement is the only way of reuniting a family
- Resettlement is the only way for building a durable future

If one or more of these criteria are met it still needs to be assessed whether third country resettlement is the most appropriate durable solution compared to voluntary return and local integration.

It is also possible for multiple refugees to be submitted for resettlement if they share specific circumstances, such as similar reasons for their flight and no prospects of return. Examples for group resettlement were the Lost Boys of Sudan from Kenya, Liberians from Guinea and Sierra Leone, Burundians from Tanzania and Eritreans from Ethiopia and Saudi Arabia.

===== Biases in the selection process =====
Receiving countries tend to use their own criteria for selecting refugees for resettlement. Many governments prioritise women and complete families and deprioritise single males. This happens in order to minimise potential security risks.

Even the UNHCR resettlement officers who submit refugees' dossiers to potential receiving countries may themselves bias the selection. For example, it was revealed that UNHCR staff in Nairobi extorted money from refugees for resettlement places. Apart from that, large families are more likely to be considered for resettlement than singles, because resettlement officers have to work through fewer case files per submitted person when referring large families. Also single men, who are likely to receive a more thorough and time-consuming security screening from resettlement states, are less likely to be submitted.

To be referred for resettlement may involve a tedious game with refugee chairmen, agency personnel or security guards. Chairmen can help making up stories or can ignore real security issues. The refugees themselves may manipulate the selection process. They may not mention that they have recently married in order not to delay their departure or they make themselves younger or older in order to, putatively, increase their chances for resettlement. They may even exaggerate their level of vulnerability as has been noticed in Kakuma: men staged violent attacks on themselves or their dwellings and women pretended rapes; they may be hiding their military or rebel past, or change their ethnicity, in order to belong to a certain persecuted group.

==== Countries select ====
After refugees are referred for resettlement and agree to be resettled they are suggested to suitable countries that run resettlement programmes. Each participating government can select from the referrals and refugees themselves cannot choose their country of resettlement. Even though receiving countries should not select refugees according to their own criteria, it may be that societal and political desires influence which groups of refugees are received. Countries make their decisions based on either just a dossier or following an interview with the refugee. After the selection process is completed there are additional government interviews and security checks. The interview process may be hard for children and young adults. According to the Lost Boys of Sudan study, 74% of the 304 surveyed Sudanese refugees in the local refugee foster care programs affiliated with the US Unaccompanied Refugee Minors Program reported that they found immigration interviews and processing emotionally difficult.

When the security checks are passed, health assessments and a cultural orientation training follow. The latter should emphasise on the potential challenges for refugees in the receiving country. The cultural orientation trainings do not always happen and they differ in duration and depth. The Gateway Resettlement Programme for example, used to provide two weeks of cultural orientation when it was launched in 2004; however this has shrunk to three hours in 2016. In addition to helping refugees begin to prepare for life in a new country, cultural orientation can also contribute to the uncertainty and stress associated with resettlement.

=== Departure ===
Refugees are assisted to travel into the receiving country, usually by airplane. From being selected for resettlement to actually arriving in the US, it usually takes between 18–24 months. Refugees who are resettled in the US have to pay back a loan for their flight tickets which is provided by the International Organization for Migration (IOM).

In certain circumstances, where refugees have to be evacuated immediately from life-threatening situations in the first country of asylum, they can be brought to Emergency Transit Centres (ETC). These provide a temporary safe haven before receiving countries are ready to take them. The Timișoara Emergency Transit Centre in Romania, that opened in 2008, was Europe's first evacuation centre. The Humenné Emergency Transit Centre in Slovakia was opened in 2009. However, these ETCs together can only accommodate up to 300 people.

IOM staff escorts the refugees to the receiving country and can provide a medical escort, if needed. As most refugees have no experience of air travel, the escort assists them with the preparation for the travel and with the journey itself, guiding and monitoring them throughout the journey and until they are handed over to the post-arrival service of the receiving country.

=== Post-arrival ===
Refugees are met at the airport and get immediate integration and orientation support in most countries. Upon arrival in the country refugees have the right to reside in the country and do not need to apply for asylum. Refugees who are resettled to the US have to pay rent after six months. Once a refugee is resettled in a third country the main focus is to help them become self-sufficient.

Refugees and asylum seekers face multiple difficulties sustaining their lives in destination countries. In particular, finding and maintaining meaningful employment that provides sustainable amount of pay is very difficult for refugees in receiving countries, because they face multiple barriers related to refugee employment. One way suggested to deal with such refugee employment issues is through cross-sector collaboration, where businesses, governmental organizations, educational institutions and support organizations are engaged to share resources and knowledge to tackle the resettlement concern.

== Approaches for resettlement ==
One approach for refugee resettlement, especially in the United States, has been the work-first approach. The result of this approach is an increase in employment rates as refugees are provided with resources—language lessons, resume building, interview skills, etc.—that prepare them for obtaining their first job. The limits of this approach have been ignoring other factors that present as barriers to employment rates including mental and physical health problems, unfamiliarity with work and social culture in their new environment, and "brain waste" which is a term used to describe those who have professional qualifications but their English language proficiency is limited and prevents them from obtaining jobs matching their skills. This job-first focus does not take into account that refugees have limited time to adjust to their new environment and enter low-skilled jobs. Furthermore, scholars note that the job-first approach fails to acknowledge or effectively alleviate the financial pressures that refugee families face which cause them to drop-out of educational pathways early, which further inhibit their career opportunities. Additionally, the work-first approach also ignores the background of refugees; this population does not receive services that match their specific needs.

Alternatively, the work-first approach has also been utilized as a potential framework for more equitable work-environments and opportunities for refugees. To do this, scholars have argued for the possibility of utilizing employment support organizations in order to provide refugees temporary support before entering the work force. Through the usage of individualized plans created together via the counselor and refugee, refugees are able to come to long-term and short-term employment goals alongside employment connection opportunities. Furthermore, scholars argue that by reforming the work-first approach, and by ensuring that local employers are more considerate and aware of the strengths and practical experience that refugees already have, it is possible for both the employer and refugee to benefit. For example, scholars note mutual benefits such as a beneficial work experience that can be placed within a CV, or to increase diversity within an organization. However, scholars maintain that support services which meet wellbeing needs outside professional concerns are just as vital towards the success of this approach.

Another approach has been increasing social and political power of refugees through advocacy work and at the same time involving refugees themselves through partnerships with NGOs and federal/local government. This approach can create a foundation for future collective action. Political advocacy can be most effective if members of the community themselves become involved and voice their needs, which differs in each refugee community. Efforts can be made by academics and researchers to publicize the benefits that refugees provide to their local communities, and highlight the negative consequences of their exclusion. Such scholars can testify in front of congress as non-government experts to influence policy decisions that could ultimately benefit refugees. By involving refugees in decision making and advocacy work, NGOs can teach them how to complete processes themselves starting from their arrival in the new country. This can help staff of such organizations as they would not be overwhelmed since refugees learn to fill out forms and other tasks as their language proficiency increases.

Additional benefits of the political and social empowerment approach to refugee resettlement has are health and communal wellbeing benefits. Scholars note that if social connectedness is fostered between refugees and the countries they newly settle into, it creates opportunities for refugees to obtain a heightened sense of belonging. Furthermore, regarding health benefits, researchers note that refugees who experience weak social connectedness often face higher chances of having unhealthy mental conditions, such as obtaining a mental illness, while alternatively, refugees with stronger social connectedness were able to lessen the harmful effects brought upon by unhealthy mental conditions.

Resettlement is seen as a crucial protection tool for LGBT refugees in Turkey since they also face discrimination and cannot access rights in Turkey.

== Resettlement programmes ==
Since 1995 Annual Tripartite Consultations on Resettlement (ATCR) are held. The UNHCR, involved or interested governments as well as NGOs come together to discuss global and national resettlement strategies, cooperations and make agreements on resettlement. In 2012 there were 26 third countries which run specific and ongoing resettlement programmes in co-operation with the UNHCR. The largest programmes are run by the United States, Canada and Australia. A number of European countries run smaller schemes and in 2004 the United Kingdom established its own scheme, known as the Gateway Protection Programme with an initial annual quota of 750. The smallest is run by Japan which offers 30 resettlement places per year.

=== Europe ===
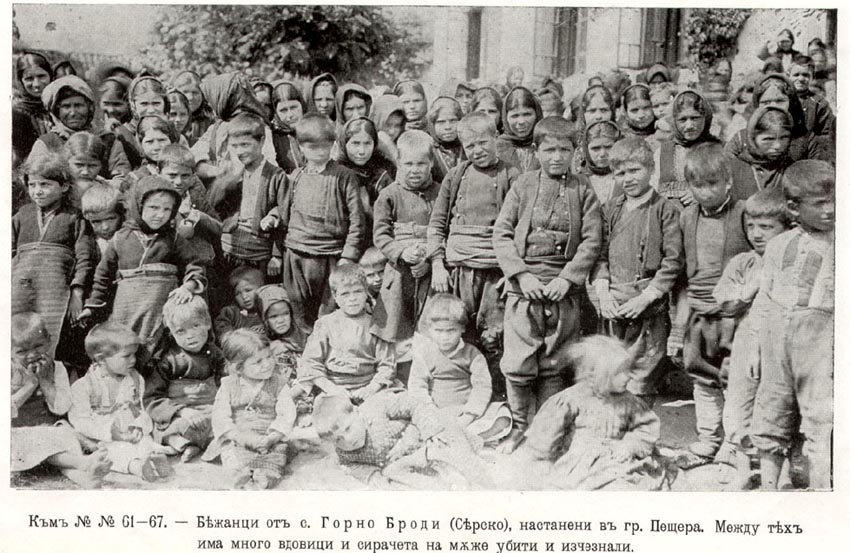
Bulgarian refugee children from Gorno Brodi after the Second Balkan War resettled in Pestera

In September 2009, the European Commission unveiled plans for new Joint EU Resettlement Programme. The scheme would involve EU member states deciding together each year which refugees should be given priority. Member states would receive €4,000 from the European Refugee Fund per refugee resettled.

=== United States ===
The United States helped resettle roughly 2 million refugees between 1945 and 1979, when the country's refugee resettlement program was restructured. Refugees destined for the United States are screened by six different federal agencies. The average time it takes from referral to arrival of a refugee is 18 to 24 months. The United States has an Office of Refugee Resettlement (ORR) that aids refugees in resettlement through programs that provide them with critical resources to facilitate their integration into American society.

In a recent exploratory study of approaches used in ORR Programs, a number of key factors were identified that contribute to the successful employment of newly arrived refugees: (1) pre- and post-employment services, (2) individualised goal-oriented approaches with each refugee, (3) culturally diverse staff, (4) refugees who are survivors with high levels of motivation, (5) clear messaging about the ORR's mission statement in all programs, and (6) proper coordination among refugee providers and between refugee and mainstream services at the systemic level. The ORR has also identified a number of areas of improvement in these programs, such as the need to understand the employment structure of a local community by refugee service agencies, more focus on refugees who are difficult to employ, increased creativity in identifying job opportunities and overcoming barriers, creating more appropriate levels of subsidy and training for each position, more understanding of cultural issues that influence program design.

The number of refugees resettled in the United States is statutorily limited by an annual ceiling that the U.S. president determines each fiscal year (FY). Since 1980, some 50,000 refugees have been resettled in the United States each fiscal year. In FY 2019, the number of accepted refugees dropped from 45,000 to 30,000, the lowest it has been in U.S. history after the brief period after the September 11 attacks. In September 2019, the Trump administration announced its intention to further reduce the refugee quota to 18,000 for incoming FY 2020.

As a result of the 1980 Refugee Act, the U.S. State Department and federal refugee resettlement program formally acknowledges and coordinates with 11 "Voluntary Agencies" (VOLAGS), which are non-governmental organizations that assist the federal government in the resettlement process. These organizations assist the refugees with day-to-day needs during their transition into a completely new culture. The State Department and Office of Refugee Resettlement offer grants for the purpose of providing for refugees' day-to-day needs, and many VOLAGS additionally draw from their own resources and volunteers. Most VOLAGS have local offices, as well as caseworkers who provide individualised aid to each refugee's situation. They also rely on the sponsorship of individuals or groups, such as faith-based congregations or local organizations. The largest of the VOLAGS is the Migration and Refugee Services of the U.S. Catholic Conference. Others include Church World Service, Episcopal Migration Ministries, the Ethiopian Community Development Council, the Hebrew Immigrant Aid Society, the International Rescue Committee, Lutheran Immigration and Refugee Service, the U.S. Committee for Refugees and Immigrants, and World Relief.

There are a number of advantages to the strategy of using agencies other than the government to directly assist in resettlement. First of all, it has been estimated that for a federal or state bureaucracy to resettle refugees instead of the VOLAGS would double the overall cost. These agencies are often able to procure large quantities of donations and, more importantly, volunteers. One study showed that instead of requiring resettlement staff to work nights, weekends, and overtime to meet the demands of the large cultural transition of new refugees, the use of volunteers can reduce the overall cost down to roughly a quarter. VOLAGS are also more flexible and responsive than the federal government since they are smaller and rely on their own funds.

Other studies have found that refugee settlements in the United States have no impact on terrorism or crime.

==== Economic empowerment in the United States ====
Refugee resettlement in the U.S. emerged as a response to the violence brought on by World War II that displaced millions of people in Europe. Non-governmental groups partnered with the U.S. government to respond to this humanitarian crisis in the 1930s, playing vital roles in the future resettlement of refugees. During the next 40 years, the U.S. was committed to expanding its focus to continents other than Europe, coordinating with non-governmental organizations (NGOs) to help those most in need. The U.S. Refugee Act of 1980 established political asylum in the United States, creating refugee resettlement programs to ease the transition of new refugees arriving in America. One objective of the Refugee Act was economic self-sufficiency. Efforts were made toward helping refugees find employment and cease their dependence on federal and state aid. After the passage of the Personal Responsibility and Work Opportunity Reauthorization Act under President Clinton, poor families could receive support for five years provided they maintained a job search. After this period, U.S. federal law prevented any further forms of cash assistance. This affected legal immigrants and refugees as they struggled to learn English and find employment at the same time. These key events intertwined the relationship between federal and state governments and non-governmental organizations as they partnered to provide resources to refugees.

The refugee program in the U.S. emphasizes the "work-first" approach. The result of this approach is an increase in employment rates as refugees are provided with resources—English language lessons, resume building, interview skills, etc.—that prepare refugees in obtaining their first job in the U.S. The limits to this approach include ignoring real some barriers to employment, including mental and physical health problems as well as unfamiliarity with work and social culture in the refugee's new environment. This job-first focus does not take into account that refugees have limited time to adjust to their new environment. Without acknowledging people’s concerns from a bottom-up perspective, one that allows refugees themselves to make informed decisions and create change for themselves, the job-first focus approach cannot be as effective. The result can be underemployment. Regardless of their qualifications, new refugees generally take lower-level jobs as janitors, hotel maids and domestic workers. Interviews with refugees often portray the shame members of the group experience, even though on paper they are employed and "self-sufficient". The job-first approach may be effective in helping refugees find low-skilled jobs immediately, but it ignores their underemployment rate and their other essential needs. It encourages ceasing dependence on welfare. some experts have suggested that any new approaches must strengthen the workforce, allowing refugees to build essential skills toward further advancement in employment or education, which can be achieved by addressing other needs such as mental health, affordable housing, and beyond policies that merely determine the lowest wage needed for mere survival.

A challenge for empowerment has been determining who is responsible for providing funds for refugee resettlement. Although the U.S. Department of State has provided funding over the years, empowerment programs have struggled as the number of refugees increased and unemployment rose within the country. In communities in states such as Tennessee, state and local governments have experienced unemployment and budget issues, and authorities there have questioned the costs of resettlement—notably the use of resources to meet the housing, education, and health needs of refugees. These governments have no choice but to place the responsibility into the hands of the private sector and even refugees, to sustain themselves. The role of the government has become limited; government often attempts to solve poverty in the least costly manner possible, providing little public money and trying not to expand its involvement. This not only affects the poor within the U.S. but refugees who struggle to find jobs. Without appropriate funding, pressure is put on local welfare agencies, giving them discretion over who obtains resources. in fact, the rationing of resources has become a common practice found among workers at the front lines of service delivery, who must balance client demand with limited resources. Under these circumstances workers will routinely expend limited resources on select clients, while withholding them from others. Street-level studies have found that refugee workers routinely target resources toward those clients who are most likely to gain from the desired outcomes of intervention. In practice, neutral legislation in the case of refugee resettlement varies across the United States, as local offices have discretion over the distribution of resources.

==== Refugee legal aid in the United States ====
One of the most critical components of refugee resettlement in the United States is access to free or affordable legal services. Upon arriving in the United States, refugees face many legal hurdles: from permanent residency, to work authorization, and even legal struggles such as fraud or eviction. Such legal concerns make refugees and other immigrants more vulnerable to exploitation and abuse. That being said, the United States government does not provide a right to representation in civil trials. Only those accused of a criminal offense may be appointed a government attorney, leading to a distinguishable gap in access to justice for refugees who may not be able to afford legal support on their own. One of the main solutions to this growing problem is the presence of legal aid organizations, through which refugees may seek legal services for little to no cost. These legal aid organizations have been an important resource for refugees in the resettlement process in the United States.

Refugee legal aid programs in the United States take many different forms, and are often shaped by strict federal restrictions on who legal aid organizations are allowed to represent. Despite the fact that the United States has a long history of federal support for immigration legal aid, current restrictions limit what kinds of immigrants federally-funded organizations can represent. Most refugee legal aid organizations receive federal support from the Legal Services Corporation (LSC), a federally-owned nonprofit that funds legal aid offices across the nation. However, any legal aid organization that receives funding from the LSC may not represent certain types of immigrants, limiting the scope of services offered. Furthermore, funding for support of refugees specifically is highly affected by current global affairs and American diplomatic relations. For instance, during President Trump's second term a travel ban was placed on several countries such as South Sudan, Syria, and Yemen. Citizens of these nations were unable to enter the United States under refugee status, and any that did would not be able to receive aid from an LSC-funded organization due to the current administration's restrictions. In an effort to work around such restrictions, many legal aid offices have refused federal funding. Instead, many of these organizations pursue private and pro bono funding options that allow them to offer legal aid for all refugees and immigrants. One example of an organization that refuses federal funding in order to serve undocumented immigrants and restricted refugee populations is the National Immigration Law Center (NILC). Originally known as the National Center for Immigrants' Rights, the NILC was founded by the LSC in 1979. Headquartered in Los Angeles, the NILC focused on advocating on behalf of immigrants within the American legal system. However, after new policies restricted what kinds of immigrants attorneys at the organization could represent, the NILC turned completely away from federal funding, instead relying on private donors in order to serve a broader refugee and immigrant population.

Despite the expansion of limitations on what immigrants may be represented, many federally funded immigration legal aid services continue to do important work within the refugee resettlement and legal services sphere. A prime example of refugee legal aid being utilized as a tool of resettlement is the International Rescue Committee's immigration program. Domestically, the International Rescue Committee offers free or affordable legal services to immigrants. In field offices across the nation, refugees may seek representation and assistance on legal matters from travel documents, to applications for permanent residency, often at little to no cost. However, recent restrictions on the movement of refugees into the United States and a cut of federal funding for resettlement agencies has severely limited the resources available to the IRC. Such challenges are faced by immigrant serving legal aid organizations across the nation. Despite remaining such an essential service, federal support for immigration legal aid changes significantly with the shifting political tides.

=== South America ===
Around 1,100 refugees, mainly Colombians, were resettled within South America between 2005 and 2014 through the "Solidarity Resettlement Programme". However, as many refugees expected to be resettled to the US or Europe 22% of them left again, possibly returning to the country of first asylum or the country of origin.

In 2011 the combined quota of Argentina, Brazil, Chile, Paraguay and Uruguay together was 230 resettlement places.

== Resettlement gap ==
The refugee resettlement gap refers to the number of refugees judged eligible for third country resettlement compared to the number of refugees who have been resettled in that year. The difference between these two figures occurs due to fluctuations in refugee needs and due to UN member state policies towards resettlement within their borders. In 2017, the UNHCR judged the number of refugees in need of resettlement to be 1.19 million. That same year, 75,200 refugees were submitted for resettlement, across all UN member states. In 2018, at the 24th Annual Tripartite Consultations on Resettlement, the UNHCR stated its intention to expand resettlement pathways and strengthen state partnerships.

Resettlement gap in 2011
Region of asylum	Number of refugees with resettlement need	UNHCR submissions for resettlement	UNHCR assisted departures
Africa	56,928	22,267	10,431
Americas	5,060	963	494
Asia and Pacific	56,136	38,404	37,975
Europe	18,721	7,716	4,916
Middle East and North Africa	35,462	22,493	7,833
Total	172,305	91,843	61,649

== Empowerment dynamics ==
Refugee empowerment is essential to integrate them into host societies. Empowerment Dynamics in third country resettlement refers to the different dimensions of empowerment that are essential to the refugee resettlement process. A research paper titled "Crystalline Empowerment: Negotiating Tensions in Refugee Resettlement," written by Tiffany A Dykstra-DeVette and Heather E Canary, sheds light on the complex dynamics of empowerment in the resettlement landscape.

The research identifies three main forms of empowerment: economic, community, and technological, and explores the intricate web of tensions and dynamics embedded within each. The study highlights the coexistence of symbolic and material empowerment, the active and passive roles of refugees, and the paradoxical impact of technology on empowerment efforts.

The research introduces the concept of "crystalline empowerment," which acknowledges the presence of contradictions, negotiations, and diverse cultural perspectives in the multifaceted nature of empowerment. It advocates for an inclusive approach that integrates diverse cultural understandings of empowerment instead of dominant Western-centric viewpoints.

The study offers actionable insights for refining empowerment strategies in third country resettlement scenarios. These include the strategic recruitment of former refugees as caseworkers and the use of technology-based approaches to bridge communication gaps and enhance resource accessibility.

The research emphasizes the importance of embracing diversity and contradictions in conceptualizing and executing empowerment strategies. It highlights the necessity of inclusive practices that honor and integrate various cultural perspectives, ultimately contributing to more effective and culturally sensitive resettlement initiatives.

== See also ==
- Refugee children Education
