= Nation of Sanctuary =

Welsh Government initiative for asylum seekers and refugees

Welsh Government Nation of Sanctuary logo

The Nation of Sanctuary (NOS; Welsh: Cenedl Noddfa; CN) is an initiative of the Welsh Government which aims to promote community cohesion and the integration of asylum seekers and refugees in Wales by offering them services and financial and social support covering areas such as housing, language, employment and education. Since its launch in 2019, over 80% of the refugees and asylum seekers supported by the initiative have been Ukrainians who fled their nation after the Russian invasion of Ukraine in 2022, with the rest being refugees from Hong Kong and Afghanistan.

The Nation of Sanctuary was first developed in the 2010s by Welsh Labour under First Minister Carwyn Jones, who developed it as a progressive alternative to the anti-immigration policies of the UK Government and the UK Labour Party in the aftermath of the 2015 European migrant crisis as part of Welsh Labour's clear red water strategy. Launched in 2019, the Nation of Sanctuary offers refugees and asylum seekers support such as subsidised transport and English and Welsh language education. By 2025, £55 million had been spent on the scheme.

The Nation of Sanctuary scheme is endorsed by the United Nations. Supporters of the scheme, including Welsh Labour and Plaid Cymru, argue that it encourages the integration of immigrants into Welsh society, boosts the economy and meets a humanitarian moral obligation to help those in need, whereas opponents such as Reform UK and the Welsh Conservatives argue that the scheme could promote illegal immigration and that the money should be spent elsewhere to prioritise citizens first. Public opposition to the scheme was a factor behind the 2025 British anti-immigration protests and Operation Raise the Colours campaign in Wales.

== Background ==
Wales has had a devolved legislature and government since 1999. Although immigration policy is still a matter reserved to the UK Government and UK Parliament in Westminster, the Welsh Government and Senedd are able to implement their own policies on the integration of immigrants to Wales by using their devolved powers over related areas such as healthcare, housing, employment and education. This has taken the form of integration programmes for asylum seekers and refugees with policies such as transport subsidies and government funded Welsh and English language lessons in schools, which are provided by the Welsh Government's Nation of Sanctuary initiative. Based on the UK-wide City of Sanctuary movement, this initiative aims to promote community cohesion and the integration of asylum seekers and refugees in Wales by offering them services and financial and social support covering areas such as housing, language, employment and education. In the UK, sanctuary cities aim to cultivate a safe, welcoming and hospitable environment for asylum seekers and refugees by providing them with services such as housing, education, and cultural integration at the local or regional authority level, typically in opposition to the more adversarial policies of the central UK Government, to ensure that they integrate into society.

== History ==
=== Early concept and discussions ===
The concept of the Nation of Sanctuary was first developed by Welsh Labour under First Minister Carwyn Jones in the early 2010s as a more progressive Welsh alternative to the anti-immigration policies pursued by the UK Government since the late 1990s under New Labour, Conservative–Liberal Democrat and Conservative governments, which focussed on deterring illegal immigration to the United Kingdom by introducing restrictions against asylum seekers and refugees, including the hostile environment policy of the Home Office implemented from 2012. Welsh Labour developed the Nation of Sanctuary initiative as an element of its clear red water strategy of distancing itself and adopting more progressive policies than UK Labour, which had a more sceptical and oppositional policy on immigration.

In 2012, Jones discussed the concept of a national city of sanctuary model for Wales following discussions with the City of Sanctuary movement's co-founder Inderjit Bhogal and Cytûn chair Aled Edwards, who successfully pitched the idea of turning Wales into the world's "first nation of sanctuary" to Jones and possibly also his predecessor Rhodri Morgan, in a similar vein to how Wales became the world's first accredited Fairtrade Nation in 2008. The early concept included the local promotion and roll-out of sanctuary cities, towns and groups across Wales which would support the inclusion, integration and wellbeing of refugees and asylum seekers to promote community cohesion and ensure that asylum seekers and refugees contribute to Welsh society, with the support of the Welsh Government. In March 2013, Jones publicly declared his support for the Nation of Sanctuary concept and announced that the Welsh Government would employ eight regional community cohesion coordinators who would work with local authorities and look into discussing policies with Cytûn and other local stakeholders to work towards this goal of making Wales the world's first nation of sanctuary.

=== Refugee summit and enquiry ===
In the following years, third sector charities and organisations continued to collaborate with the Welsh Government to further develop the concept. From 2015, the Nation of Sanctuary concept was redeveloped from a national model of sanctuary cities and towns to a government-sponsored strategy of Wales as a whole serving as a sanctuary for asylum seekers and refugees, with national policies implemented by the Welsh Government to achieve this. Following an outpour of public support and sympathy for asylum seekers and refugees amid the 2015 European migrant crisis and the death of Alan Kurdi, the Welsh Labour government called an emergency refugee summit in September 2015 to discuss a Welsh approach to resettlement, partially in protest of the UK Government's hostile environment policy, which was accompanied by the creation of the Welsh Refugee Coalition. From the summer of 2015, the UK Government resettled refugees and asylum seekers to communities across Wales under its Syrian Vulnerable Person Resettlement Programme, including rural and semi-rural communities that had no prior experience of immigration, which further promoted the necessity for a national policy on asylum and resettlement by the Welsh Government. Local volunteer groups were established to support refugees and asylum seekers across Wales.

Political traction for a national Nation of Sanctuary strategy grew ahead of the 2016 National Assembly for Wales election, when the Welsh Refugee Coalition lobbied assembly members to support and prioritise the cultivation of Wales as a Nation of Sanctuary. Support for the Nation of Sanctuary became a manifesto commitment of the Welsh Liberal Democrats and Plaid Cymru and was also echoed by the Welsh Labour government ahead of the election. Following the election, the National Assembly for Wales Equality, Local Government and Communities Committee (ELGCC) initiated an enquiry into Welsh asylum and refugee policy and the response of the Welsh Government to the displacement of Syrian refugees. The committee's membership at this time included four Welsh Labour AMs, two Plaid Cymru AMs, one Welsh Conservative AM and one UK Independence Party AM. (Note: John Griffiths, Rhianon Passmore, Jenny Rathbone and Joyce Watson from Welsh Labour, Bethan Jenkins and Siân Gwenllian from Plaid Cymru, Janet Finch-Saunders from the Welsh Conservatives and Gareth Bennett from the UK Independence Party.)

The work of the committee's enquiry took place on the backdrop of the 2016 Brexit referendum, where Wales voted to leave the European Union. Much of the rhetoric around the referendum in Wales focussed on immigration, leading to a rise in anti-immigration rhetoric. This influenced most members of the committee towards a more supportive view of sanctuary, which was emboldened by the anti-immigration stances of the UKIP committee member Gareth Bennett, who's uncompromising views on immigration alienated the other members and made them support a more accepting approach because of their personal opposition to his views and their failure to come to a compromise. Drawing on the work of the Scottish Government and its New Scots initiative, the members of the committee focussed on a national strategy for the Nation of Sanctuary.

=== Adoption and implementation ===
The committee reported back on its findings in April 2017 in its report I used to be someone: Refugees and asylum seekers in Wales, which recommended that the Welsh Government use its devolved powers to develop a national Nation of Sanctuary strategy, despite immigration itself remaining reserved to Westminster, to improve the wellbeing and integration of refugees and asylum seekers in Wales. In March 2018, the Welsh Government published its draft strategy for the Nation of Sanctuary, which committed the government to supporting the integration of asylum seekers and refugees by granting them access to Welsh healthcare services with health assessments on arrival, providing them with information, advice and, for unaccompanied children in particular, safeguarding support, and making them eligible for Welsh Government schemes deemed to support their integration. A cross-party consensus emerged in the National Assembly for Wales supporting the Nation of Sanctuary, with almost all parties voicing their support for the national strategy except for UKIP, which continued to oppose it.

In March 2019, the Welsh Government formally launched the Nation of Sanctuary initiative and published its finalised strategy, Nation of Sanctuary: Refugee and Asylum Seeker Plan. Jane Hutt, the minister responsible for the initiative as minister for social justice, said the initiative would help refugees and asylum seekers contribute to their communities by becoming, for example, doctors, farmers or carpenters rather than applying for benefits from the British state, which was seen by the Welsh Refugee Council as the result of the UK Government's approach to asylum seekers and refugees. The adoption of the initiative took place during a period when other European countries were trying to deter illegal immigration by closing their borders to asylum seekers and refugees, and also made Wales the first country in Europe to explicitly endorse the sanctuary movement. The Welsh Government's strategy assured that it would follow UK immigration law, unlike other elements of the sanctuary movement which have disregarded national immigration law, but also committed the Welsh Government to support asylum seekers and refugees to the fullest extent that it is able to do so. After its adoption, the initiative was endorsed by the United Nations.

Following the 2021 Senedd election, the Nation of Sanctuary was maintained under the co-operation agreement between Welsh Labour under First Minister Mark Drakeford and Plaid Cymru. After the fall of Kabul in 2021 and the outbreak of the Russian invasion of Ukraine in 2022, Drakeford expressed his government's intent to encourage the settlement of Afghan and Ukrainian refugees and asylum seekers in Wales under the Nation of Sanctuary initiative. By October 2025, over 80% of the asylum seekers and refugees settled in Wales under the scheme since its adoption in 2019 were Ukrainians who had fled their country following the Russian invasion. The other recipients of the scheme were Afghans and Hong Kongers.

== Reception ==
The Nation of Sanctuary has been described as one of the main examples of Welsh Labour's clear red water strategy of distancing itself from the more centrist UK Labour Party, with the Welsh Labour government adopting a more progressive immigration strategy compared to the more anti-immigration policies of the UK Government under Labour prime ministers Tony Blair, Gordon Brown and Keir Starmer. It has been compared to Starmer's approach on language integration, with the UK Labour government focussing on teaching the English language through grassroots efforts, whereas the Welsh Labour government has adopted a national strategy of integration through the Nation of Sanctuary and has also promoted the Welsh language. The Welsh approach has been credited with helping to foster a more inclusive, multicultural and multilingual society.

Other parties supporting the Nation of Sanctuary include Plaid Cymru, the Welsh Liberal Democrats and the Wales Green Party. It is opposed by the Welsh Conservatives, UK Independence Party, Gwlad and Reform UK. Opponents of the scheme, including UKIP, the Welsh Conservatives and Reform UK, have raised concerns around the money spent on the policy and argued for British citizens to be prioritised for support. The Welsh Conservatives argue that the Welsh Government should stop spending money on issues related to immigration as immigration itself is reserved to Westminster, so that this can be spent on other fully devolved matters. Reform UK claims that the scheme is a waste of money and may encourage illegal immigration to Wales at a time when public services are overstretched and Welsh veterans need more support. Supporters of the scheme, including Welsh Labour and Plaid Cymru, argue that it encourages the integration of immigrants into Welsh society, boosts the economy and meets a humanitarian moral obligation to help those in need. Plaid Cymru has also used the scheme as an opportunity to mobilise a new base of Welsh nationalists.

In September 2025, a YouGov poll commissioned by ITV Cymru Wales had 49% of respondents express their opposition to the Nation of Sanctuary, 34% state that they support it and 17% state that they do not know if they support or oppose it. In the same month, a petition calling for the policy to be scrapped in order to focus on poverty and homelessness for Welsh citizens first received over 3,600 signatures, above the necessary threshold for discussion by the Senedd's Petitions Committee.

Public opposition to the Nation of Sanctuary was a major factor behind the 2025 British anti-immigration protests and the coinciding Operation Raise the Colours campaign in Wales. Reform UK capitalised on opposition to the scheme in its campaign for the 2025 Caerphilly by-election, making it a key element of their campaign. During the campaign, far-right groups including Patriotic Alternative and Voice of Wales organised an anti-immigration protest in Caerphilly town centre over the scheme, which was met by a larger counter-protest by the initiative's supporters. Another unrelated demonstration supporting the policy was also held in the town's Morgan Jones Park, which was attended by the candidates and other senior politicians of Welsh Labour, Plaid Cymru, the Welsh Liberal Democrats and the Wales Green Party.
