= Neo-nationalism =

Type of nationalism that rose in the mid-2010s

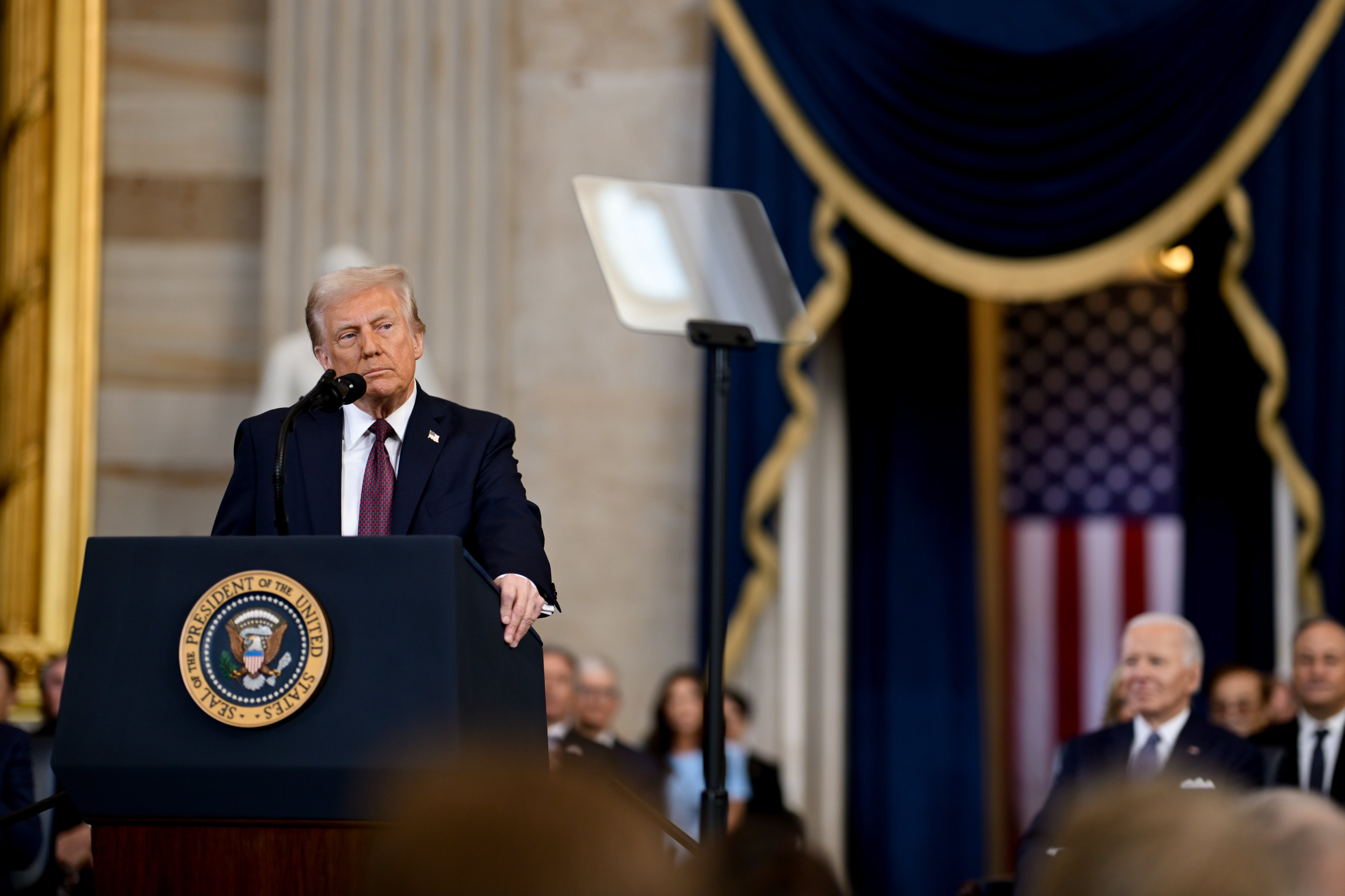
Donald Trump is seen as a symbol of neo-nationalism in the USA.

Neo-nationalism, or new nationalism, is an ideology and political movement built on the basic characteristics of classical nationalism. It developed by applying elements with reactionary character generated as a reaction to the political, economic and demographic changes that came with globalisation during the second wave of globalisation in the 1980s.

Neo-nationalism is associated with several positions such as right-wing populism, anti-globalization, nativism, protectionism, opposition to immigration, Islamophobia in non-Muslim-majority countries, and Euroscepticism, where applicable. With globalisation and the idea of a single nation, neo-nationalists see the problems of identification and threatened identities. They call for the protection of symbolic heritage, like art and folk traditions, which is also common for cultural nationalism.

Particularly notable expressions of new nationalism include the vote for Brexit in the 2016 United Kingdom European Union membership referendum and the 2016 election of Donald Trump as the president of the United States. Several neo-nationalist politicians have come to power or run strongly during the 2010s and 2020s, including Narendra Modi in India, Giorgia Meloni in Italy, Marine Le Pen in France, Rodrigo Duterte and Bongbong Marcos in the Philippines, and Jair Bolsonaro in Brazil.

== Origins ==
In political science literature, contemporary neo-nationalism is considered as a phenomenon that initially emerged across West Europe. Scholars trace its emergence to the post-Cold War period and the economic restructuring associated with late 20th-century globalization. The European Union integration and enlargement gave rise to a series of economic, social, and political changes causing uncertainties on an individual and collective level. Empowerment of the European Union by extending its members and the referendums on European Constitution formed the idea of a transnational quasi-state and a global nation under liberal democracy as the single political ideology that governs that transnational state. After the referendum on the Treaty to establish a Constitution for Europe was rejected, the delegation of national sovereignty to the European Union was seen by the neo-nationalists as a strategic act that aims at accumulation of power that undermines states’ national sovereignty and their right to self-determination.

== External factors ==
Events in the Islamic world during the late 20th century, such as the 1979 Iranian Revolution, led to increased immigration towards Western European states. Challenges regarding immigrant settlement and integration prompted policy adjustments in host countries to address demographic diversity. The introduction of multicultural policies alongside traditional national norms led neo-nationalists to perceive a threat to their national identity. This process was framed as "Islamization" and turned into the explanatory factor for a specific defensive collective behaviour.

The conflicts and the violence that followed after the political destabilization in some Muslim majority states led to the categorisation of Islam as having an anti-democratic and anti-modern character that is at odds with Western liberal democracy. After the September 11 attacks, this image of Islam became dominant. The perceived Islamic threat to European culture led to increased nationalist sentiment and call to protect national identity.

== Roots in nationalism ==
Neo-nationalism is the successor to classical nationalism. Both nationalists and neo-nationalists see the nation as one family, but differ in their criteria for affiliation. Nationalists view the state and the nation as a family whose members are inextricably linked by ethnic, racial, genetic, religious, or cultural homogeneity. In contrast, neo-nationalists treat historical association as the primary basis for inclusion in the national family, distinguishing their approach to membership from that of earlier nationalists.

== Overview and characteristics ==
Writing for Politico, Michael Hirsh described new nationalism as "a bitter populist rejection of the status quo that global elites have imposed on the international system since the Cold War ended, and which lower-income voters have decided—understandably—is unfair". Michael Brendan Dougherty wrote in The Week that new nationalism is a "broad nativist revolt" against post-Cold War politics long "characterized by an orthodoxy of free trade, nurturing the service economy, neoliberal trading arrangements, and liberalized immigration policies". Political science professor Eirikur Bergmann defines neo-nationalism as a form of nativist populism.

The Economist wrote in November 2016 that "new nationalists are riding high on promises to close borders and restore societies to a past homogeneity". Clarence Page wrote in the Las Vegas Sun that a new neo-tribal nationalism had emerged in European politics, and to a lesser degree in the United States, following the 2008 financial crisis. In The Week, Ryan Cooper and researchers with the Centre for Economic Policy Research have linked 21st-century right-wing populism to the Great Recession. According to Harvard political theorist Yascha Mounk, "economic stagnation among lower- and middle-class whites [has been] a main driver for nationalism's rise around the globe". According to legal scholar Mark L. Movsesian, new nationalism "sets the nation-state against supranational, liberal regimes like the EU or NAFTA, and local customs and traditions, including religious traditions, against alien, outside trends".

David Brog and Yoram Hazony wrote in National Review that while some conservatives view the new nationalism associated with Brexit, Rodrigo Duterte, and Donald Trump as a betrayal of conservative ideology, the authors view it as a "return". According to conservative commentator Jonah Goldberg, the nationalism associated with Trump is "really little more than a brand name for generic white identity politics".

Writing for The Week, Damon Linker called the idea of neo-nationalism being racist "nonsense" and went on to say that "the tendency of progressives to describe it as nothing but 'racism, Islamophobia, and xenophobia'—is the desire to delegitimize any particularistic attachment or form of solidarity, be it national, linguistic, religious, territorial, or ethnic".

Regarding new nationalism, The Economist said that "Mr Trump needs to realise that his policies will unfold in the context of other countries' jealous nationalism" and called nationalism itself a "slippery concept" that is "easy to manipulate". The publication contrasted ethnic nationalism with civic nationalism and argued that new nationalism could become "angry" and difficult to control, citing Chinese nationalism as an example.

== Associated politicians, parties and events ==
=== Brazil ===
The president of Brazil Jair Bolsonaro of the country's Liberal Party has been described as a leading new nationalist. Bolsonaro's ideology and policies have been heavily influenced by his adviser, nationalist thinker Olavo de Carvalho.

=== China ===
Chinese Communist Party general secretary Xi Jinping's concept of "Chinese Dream" has been described as an expression of new nationalism. His form of nationalism stresses pride in the historic Chinese civilisation, embracing the teachings of Confucius and other ancient Chinese sages, and thus rejecting the anti-Confucius campaign of Mao Zedong. New Confucian scholar Chen Ming has described the shift in ideology of the Chinese Communist Party, as "from the vanguard party of the proletarian to the vanguard party of the Chinese nation", and "from Communist utopia to the national rejuvenation of the Chinese Minzu".

=== Egypt ===
Egyptian President Abdel Fattah el-Sisi (assumed office in 2014), and Nation's Future Party has been described as a new nationalist.

=== Hungary ===
Hungarian Prime Minister Viktor Orbán (assumed office from 1998 to 2002 and from 2010 to 2026), the leader of the then-ruling Fidesz party, has been described as a new nationalist.

=== India ===
Indian Prime Minister Narendra Modi (assumed office in 2014) and his Bharatiya Janata Party (BJP) have been referred to as neo-nationalist. Modi is a volunteer in the Rashtriya Swayamsevak Sangh (RSS), a religio-socio-cultural voluntary organisation to which the BJP is aligned with, which has also been said to advocate a neo-nationalist ideology. His electoral campaigns have been managed by Amit Shah, the Minister of Home Affairs since 2019, who has been touted as a potential successor to Modi as Prime Minister.

Yogi Adityanath, Chief Minister of the Indian state of Uttar Pradesh (assumed office in 2017), has also been identified as a neo-nationalist. He has also been touted as a future Prime Minister of the country.

=== Israel ===
Israeli Prime Minister Benjamin Netanyahu (assumed office from 1996 to 1999, 2009 to 2021 and 2022), the leader of the Likud party, has been described both as promoting new nationalism, and as pursuing a foreign policy of close ties with other new nationalist leaders, including Trump, Orbán, Salvini, Putin, Modi, Bolsonaro, Duterte and Sisi.

In 2019, Netanyahu has forged a political alliance with the ultranationalist Union of Right-Wing Parties.

=== Italy ===
Italian Prime Minister Giuseppe Conte (assumed office from 2018 to 2021), head of the populist coalition Government of Change, and in particular former Deputy Prime Minister and Interior Minister and the League's leader Matteo Salvini (2018–2019), were often described as new nationalists. While in office, Salvini was described by some media outlets as the most powerful politician in the country, and a "de facto prime minister". In August 2019, Salvini filed a motion of no confidence in the coalition government, asking new election to take "full powers", but Conte formed a new government between Five Star Movement (M5S) and Democratic Party (PD). At the head of this new cabinet, Conte toned down his neo-nationalist rhetoric.

In the 2022 Italian general election, the neo-nationalist Brothers of Italy emerged as the most voted party and its leader, Giorgia Meloni, became the new prime minister on 22 October 2022, at the head of what it was described as the most right-wing government in Italy since 1945.

=== Japan ===
The 63rd Prime Minister Shinzō Abe (assumed office from 2012 to 2020), a member of the far-right organisation Nippon Kaigi, promoted ideas of new nationalism, as did the Liberal Democratic Party of Japan, which he led.

=== Mexico ===
Mexican President Andrés Manuel López Obrador (2018–2024) has been described as neo-nationalist and often dubbed as "Mexican Donald Trump" by the media.

=== Pakistan ===
Former Pakistani prime minister Imran Khan (2018–2022), the leader of the then-ruling Pakistan Tehreek-e-Insaf (Pakistan Movement for Justice) was compared to Donald Trump and described as a neo-nationalist populist during his tenure.

=== Philippines ===
Philippine President Rodrigo Duterte (2016–2022) has been described as a neo-nationalist. His party PDP-Laban has adopted Filipino nationalism as a platform.

=== Poland ===
Confederation is a main political coalition in Poland that promotes new nationalism, especially the National Movement. There is also a neofascist and National Radical Narodowe Odrodzenie Polski that promotes harshly anti-globalist, anti-immigrant and anti-liberal agenda.

=== Russia ===
President of Russia Vladimir Putin (second President of Russia from 2000 to 2008 and fourth President of Russia from 2012) has been labelled a new nationalist. Putin has been described by Hirsh as "the harbinger of this new global nationalism". Charles Clover, the Moscow bureau chief of the Financial Times from 2008 to 2013, wrote a book in 2016 titled Black Wind, White Snow: The Rise of Russia's New Nationalism. Russian nationalist thinker Aleksandr Dugin in particular has had influence over the Kremlin, serving as an adviser to key members of the ruling United Russia party, including now-SVR Director Sergey Naryshkin.

Russia has been accused of supporting new nationalist movements across the Western World.

=== Saudi Arabia ===
The Crown Prince of Saudi Arabia, Mohammad bin Salman (assumed office in 2017), has been described by Kristin Diwan of The Arab Gulf States Institute as being attached to a "strong new nationalism". The "new Saudi nationalism" has been used to bolster support for the Kingdom's economic and foreign policies, and represents a shift away from the Kingdom's earlier dependence on religion for legitimacy. Many of the country's foreign policy actions from 2017 onwards, such as its blockade of Qatar and its diplomatic dispute with Canada have been described as motivated by this nationalism. The policies of Mohammad bin Salman's administration have been heavily influenced by his adviser Saud al-Qahtani, who has been described as a "nationalist ideologue" and whose role has been compared to that formerly of Steve Bannon.

=== Serbia ===
Aleksandar Vučić, the leader of Serbia until 2026 and of the Serbian Progressive Party, has been described as a proponent of a Serbian version of neo-nationalism. It is noted that his version "combines neo-nationalist sovereignty assertion with Serb ethnic nationalism."

=== Turkey ===
In 2014, Mustafa Akyol wrote of a new "brand of Turkish neonationalism" promoted by Justice and Development Party (AKP), the country's ruling party, whose leader is President Recep Tayyip Erdoğan (assumed office in 2014). The Turkish "new nationalism" replaces the secular character of traditional forms of Turkish nationalism with an "assertively Muslim" identity.

Devlet Bahçeli, the leader of the Nationalist Movement Party (MHP), has been described as creating a "new nationalist front" by forming the People's Alliance with Erdoğan's AKP in 2018. The MHP is affiliated with the Grey Wolves paramilitary organisation, which Erdoğan has also expressed support for.

=== United Arab Emirates ===
The United Arab Emirates, under the leadership of Crown Prince of Abu Dhabi Mohammed bin Zayed (assumed office in 2004), has been described as propagating a "new Arab nationalism", which replaces the older, leftist form of the Arab nationalist ideology with a more conservative form, through its strong support for the rise of the respective new leaders of Egypt and Saudi Arabia, Abdel Fattah el-Sisi and Prince Mohammad bin Salman, as a means of countering Iranian and Turkish influence in the Arab states.

=== United Kingdom ===
The 23 June 2016 referendum in the United Kingdom to leave the European Union ("Brexit") has been described as a milestone of neo-nationalism. Owen Matthews noted similarities in motives for support of the Brexit movement and Donald Trump in the United States. He wrote in Newsweek that supporters of both are motivated by "a yearning to control immigration, reverse globalization and restore national greatness by disengaging from the wide, threatening world".

Matt O'Brien wrote of the Brexit as "the most shocking success for the new nationalism sweeping the Western world". Leaders of the Brexit campaign, such as Nigel Farage, the former leader of the eurosceptic UK Independence Party (now of Reform UK); London Mayor (now former prime minister and Conservative Party leader) Boris Johnson; Vote Leave Co-Convenor Michael Gove; former Brexit Secretary David Davis; and European Research Group chairman Jacob Rees-Mogg, have been called "new nationalists".

=== United States ===
Donald Trump's rise to the Republican nomination in 2016 was widely described as a sign of a growing new nationalism in the United States. A Chicago Sun-Times editorial on the day of the inauguration of Donald Trump called him "our new nationalist president". The appointment of Steve Bannon, an executive of Breitbart News (who later co-founded The Movement), as White House Chief Strategist was described by one analyst as the arrival of a "new world order, driven by patriotism and a fierce urge to look after your own, a neo-nationalism that endlessly smears Muslims and strives to turn back the clock on free trade and globalization, a world where military might counts for far more than diplomacy and compromise".

Following Trump's election, U.S. Senator Marco Rubio called for the Republican Party to embrace a "new nationalism" to oppose "economic elitism that has replaced a commitment to the dignity of work with a blind faith in financial markets and that views America simply as an economy instead of a nation".

=== People ===
The following politicians have all been described in some way as being neo-nationalists:

==== Africa ====
- Ibrahim Traoré, President of Burkina Faso (2022–)
- Muhammadu Buhari, President of Nigeria (2015–2023)
- Hamid Chabat, former mayor of Fez (2003–2015) and leader of the Moroccan Istiqlal Party
- Uhuru Kenyatta, President of Kenya (2013–2022) and leader of the Jubilee Party of Kenya
- Pieter Groenewald, Leader of the Freedom Front Plus and member of South African National Assembly
- Julius Malema, President of the Economic Freedom Fighters and member of South African National Assembly
- Herman Mashaba, mayor of Johannesburg (2016–2019) and ex-member of the Democratic Alliance
- John Magufuli, President of Tanzania (2015–2021)
- Isaias Afwerki, President of Eritrea (1993–)

==== Americas ====
- Jair Bolsonaro, President of Brazil (2019–2023) and former member of the Social Liberal Party.
- Olavo de Carvalho, Brazilian political pundit and journalist.
- Mario Abdo Benítez, President of Paraguay (2018–2023) and candidate from the Colorado Party
- Chi Hyun Chung, presidential candidate of 2019 Bolivian general election
- Luis Fernando Camacho, Governor of Santa Cruz (2021–2024)
- Maxime Bernier, MP, 2017 candidate for the leadership of the Conservative Party of Canada and leader of the People's Party of Canada
- Horacio Cartes, former president of Paraguay (2013–2018) and candidate from the Colorado Party
- Andrés Chadwick, Interior Minister of Chile (2012–2014; 2018–2019) and member of the Independent Democratic Union
- Juan Orlando Hernández, President of Honduras (2014–2022) and candidate from the National Party of Honduras
- José Antonio Kast, Member of the Chamber of Deputies of Chile (2002–2018) and President of Chile (2026–)
- François Legault, Premier of Quebec (2018–) and leader of the Canadian Coalition Avenir Québec
- Kellie Leitch, MP and 2017 candidate for the leadership of the Conservative Party of Canada
- Iván Duque Márquez, President of Colombia (2018–2022) and candidate from the Democratic Center
- Jimmy Morales, President of Guatemala (2016–2020) and candidate from the National Convergence Front
- Alejandro Giammattei, President of Guatemala (2020–2024)
- Fabricio Alvarado Muñoz, 2018 and 2022 presidential candidate
- Juan Diego Castro Fernández, 2018 Costa Rican presidential candidate.
- Rodrigo Chaves Robles, President of Costa Rica (2022–2026).
- Andrés Manuel López Obrador, President of Mexico (2018–2024) and founder of the National Regeneration Movement.
- Kevin O'Leary, businessman and 2017 candidate for the leadership of the Conservative Party of Canada
- Donald Trump, businessman, television personality, politician, president of the United States (2017–2021, 2025–) and member of the Republican Party.
- Marco Rubio, U.S. Senator from Florida (2011–2025); Secretary of State (2025–) and member of the Republican Party.
- Steve Bannon, American political figure, former White House Chief Strategist and former executive chairman of Breitbart News.
- Tucker Carlson, American political commentator and former host for Fox News.
- Josh Hawley, U.S. Senator from Missouri and member of the Republican Party
- Nicolás Maduro, President of Venezuela (2013–2026) and leader of the PSUV
- Daniel Ortega, President of Nicaragua
- Elise Stefanik, U.S. representative from New York and member of the Republican Party
- Marjorie Taylor Greene, former U.S. representative from Georgia and member of the Republican Party
- Lauren Boebert, U.S. representative from Colorado and member of the Republican Party
- Mary Miller, U.S. representative from Illinois and member of the Republican Party
- Matt Gaetz, U.S. representative from Florida and member of the Republican Party
- Keiko Fujimori, former First Lady of Peru, presidential candidate in 2011, 2016, and 2021

==== Asia-Pacific ====
- Tony Abbott, former prime minister of Australia (2013–2015) and former leader of the Liberal Party of Australia
- Xi Jinping, Paramount leader of China (2012–) and General Secretary of the Chinese Communist Party.
- Kim Jong-un, Supreme Leader of North Korea (2011–) and general secretary of the Workers' Party of Korea
- Khaltmaagiin Battulga, President of Mongolia (2017–2021) and candidate of the Mongolian Democratic Party
- Prayut Chan-o-cha, former Prime Minister of Thailand (2014–2023) and prime ministerial candidate of the Phalang Pracharat Party in the 2019 general election
- Peter Dutton, Leader of the Opposition (2022–2025), Minister for Defence (2021–2022), Minister for Home Affairs (2018–2021) and member of the Liberal Party of Australia
- Park Geun-hye, former president of South Korea (2013–2017) and former leader of the Saenuri Party
- Hong Jun-pyo, former leader of the Liberty Korea Party and candidate in the 2017 presidential election
- Bongbong Marcos President of the Philippines (2022–)
- Narendra Modi, Prime Minister of India (2014–) and member of the Bharatiya Janata Party.
- Shinzō Abe, former prime minister of Japan (2006–2007, 2012–2020) and former leader of the Liberal Democratic Party (2006–2007, 2012–2020).
- Tarō Asō, Deputy Prime Minister of Japan (2012–2021) and Minister of Finance (2012–2021)
- Imran Khan, Prime Minister of Pakistan (2018–2022) and leader of Pakistan Tehreek-e-Insaf
- Rodrigo Duterte, President of the Philippines (2016–2022) and leader of PDP–Laban.
- Winston Peters, former deputy prime minister of New Zealand (2017–2020) and leader of New Zealand First
- Najib Razak, former prime minister of Malaysia (2009–2018) and former leader of Barisan Nasional and the United Malays National Organisation
- Hun Sen, Prime Minister of Cambodia (1985–2023) and leader of the Cambodian People's Party
- Prabowo Subianto, President of Indonesia (2024–present), Defense Minister of Indonesia (2019–2024) and leader of the Great Indonesia Movement Party
- Abdulla Yameen, former president of the Maldives (2013–2018) and leader of the Progressive Party of Maldives
- Pauline Hanson, leader of One Nation
- Min Aung Hlaing, leader of the Tatmadaw and Chairman of the State Administration Council
- Lukar Jam Atsok, Sikyong candidate for the Central Tibetan Administration.

==== Europe ====
- Sebastian Kurz, former Chancellor of Austria (2017–2019, 2020–2021) and former leader of the Austrian People's Party
- Heinz-Christian Strache, former Vice Chancellor of Austria (2017–2019) and former leader of the Freedom Party of Austria
- Norbert Hofer, former Transport, Innovation and Technology Minister of Austria (2017–2019), leader of the Freedom Party of Austria and candidate in the 2016 presidential election.
- Tom Van Grieken, leader of the Belgian Vlaams Belang.
- Theo Francken, member of the Belgian Chamber of Representatives and former Secretary of State for Asylum, member of N-VA.
- Mischaël Modrikamen, Belgian politician and lawyer, former leader of the People's Party and former executive director of The Movement
- Tomislav Karamarko, Deputy Prime Minister of Croatia (2016) and former leader of the Croatian Democratic Union
- Boyko Borisov, Prime Minister of Bulgaria (2009–2013, 2014–2017, 2017–2021) and leader of GERB
- Rumen Radev, President of Bulgaria (2017-2026) and Prime Minister of Bulgaria (2026-)
- Volen Siderov, leader of Attack
- Kostadin Kostadinov, leader of Revival
- Radostin Vasilev, leader of MECh
- Krasimir Karakachanov, Defence Minister of Bulgaria (2017–2021), leader of IMRO – Bulgarian National Movement and spokesperson for United Patriots.
- Veselin Mareshki, Bulgarian businessman and leader of Volya.
- Karol Nawrocki, President of Poland (2025-)
- Aleksandar Vucic, Prime Minister of Serbia (2014-2017) and President of Serbia (2017-)
- Miloš Zeman, President of the Czech Republic (2013–2023), former Prime Minister of the Czech Republic (1998–2002) and leader of the Party of Civic Rights.
- Andrej Babiš, Prime Minister of the Czech Republic (2017–2021, 2025–) and leader of ANO 2011
- Tomio Okamura, leader of the Czech Freedom and Direct Democracy
- Kristian Thulesen Dahl, Former member of the Folketing and former leader of the Danish People's Party.
- Morten Messerschmidt, former MP in the European Parliament, member of the Folketing and current leader of the Danish People's Party
- Dominik Tarczyński, Member of the European Parliament for European Conservatives and Reformists Group (2020-), former member of the Sejm for Law and Justice (2015-2020).
- George Simion, Member of the Chamber of Deputies (2020-) and leader of Alliance for the Union of Romanians
- Călin Georgescu, Special Rapporteur in the Office of the United Nations High Commissioner for Human Rights (2010-2012), President of the European Research Centre for the Club of Rome (2013-2015) and independent candidate for 2024 Romanian presidential election
- Mart Helme, Deputy Prime Minister and Interior Minister of Estonia (assumed office in 2019) and leader of the Conservative People's Party of Estonia
- Jussi Halla-aho, Member of the Finnish Parliament and leader of the Finns Party.
- Marine Le Pen, leader of the French National Rally and candidate in the 2017 presidential election, 2022 presidential election.
- Éric Zemmour, leader or Reconquête and candidate in the 2022 French presidential election
- Alexander Gauland, Member of the German Bundestag and co-leader of Alternative for Germany.
- Jörg Meuthen, Member of the German Bundestag and co-leader of Alternative for Germany.
- Alice Weidel, Member of the German Bundestag and parliamentary leader of Alternative for Germany.
- Adonis Georgiadis, Minister for Development and Investment of Greece and member of New Democracy.
- Panos Kammenos, former Defence Minister of Greece (2015–2019) and leader of the Independent Greeks
- Georgios Karatzaferis, leader of Popular Orthodox Rally
- Ilias Kasidiaris, Greek agronomist and former member of the Greek Parliament.
- Ioannis Lagos, Greek MEP and leader of the National People's Conscience.
- Nikos Michaloliakos, Greek mathematician and leader of the Golden Dawn.
- Kyriakos Velopoulos, Greek television personality, politician and leader of the Greek Solution party.
- Makis Voridis, Agricultural Development Minister of Greece (assumed office in 2019) and member of New Democracy
- Failos Kranidiotis, Greek lawyer and leader of New Right.
- Viktor Orbán, Prime Minister of Hungary (1998–2002, 2010–2026) and leader of Fidesz.
- Sigmundur Davíð Gunnlaugsson, former prime minister of Iceland (2013–2016) and leader of the Centre Party
- Giorgia Meloni, Prime Minister of Italy (2022–) and leader of Brothers of Italy.
- Matteo Salvini, Deputy Prime Minister of Italy (2018–2019, 2022–) and current leader of League.
- Raivis Zeltīts, Latvian politician and Secretary General of National Alliance.
- Rolandas Paksas, former prime minister and President of Lithuania, former leader of Order and Justice.
- Nebojša Medojević, candidate in the 2008 Montenegrin presidential election and leader of Movement for Changes.
- Geert Wilders, leader of the Dutch Party for Freedom
- Thierry Baudet, member of the House of Representatives and leader of Forum for Democracy.
- Janusz Korwin-Mikke, Polish politician, philosopher, writer, former member of the European Parliament and leader of Confederation.
- Victor Ponta, former prime minister of Romania (2012–2015) and former leader of the Social Democratic Party
- Vladimir Putin, President of Russia, former prime minister of Russia and leader of United Russia.
- Robert Fico, Prime Minister of Slovakia (2006–2010, 2012–2018, 2023–) and leader of Direction-Social Democracy
- Andrej Danko, Speaker of the Slovak National Council and leader of the Slovak National Party.
- Janez Janša, Prime Minister of Slovenia and leader of the Slovenian Democratic Party
- Santiago Abascal, former member of Basque Parliament, and leader of VOX.
- Pablo Casado, Spanish opposition leader and President of People's Party
- Jimmie Åkesson, Member of the Swedish Riksdag and leader of the Sweden Democrats.
- Christoph Blocher, former member of the Swiss Federal Council and former vice president of the Swiss People's Party.
- Gerard Batten, Deputy leader of the UK Independence Party, former Member of the European Parliament and former leader of the UK Independence Party.
- Christian Tybring-Gjedde, Progress Party Member of Norwegian Parliament

==== Middle East ====
- Abdel Fattah el-Sisi, President of Egypt (2014–) and former Minister of Defence (2012–2014).
- Muqtada al-Sadr, leader of the Iraqi Sadrist Movement
- Benjamin Netanyahu, Prime Minister of Israel (1996–1999, 2009–2021, 2022–) and leader of Likud.
- Naftali Bennett, Prime Minister of Israel (2021–2022), former Israeli Minister of Education, former leader of The Jewish Home and current member of New Right.
- Khalifa Haftar, commander of the Libyan National Army (assumed office in 2015)
- Tamim bin Hamad, Emir of Qatar (2013–)
- Recep Tayyip Erdoğan, President of Turkey (2014–), former Prime Minister of Turkey (2003–2014) and leader of the Justice and Development Party.
- Mohammad bin Salman, Crown Prince of Saudi Arabia (2017–) and Deputy Prime Minister.
- Saud al-Qahtani, Saudi Arabian consultant and former Royal Court Advisor.
- Devlet Bahçeli, former Deputy Prime Minister of Turkey and leader of the Nationalist Movement Party.
- Mohammed bin Zayed Al Nahyan, Crown Prince of the United Arab Emirates.
- Bashar al-Assad, President of Syria (2000–2024).
- Mohammed Dahlan, Palestinian politician and advisor of Crown Prince Mohammed bin Zayed Al Nahyan.

=== Parties ===
The following parties have all been described in some way as being neo-nationalist parties:

==== Africa ====
- Economic Freedom Fighters in South Africa
- Freedom Front Plus in South Africa
- National Council for the Defense of Democracy – Forces for the Defense of Democracy in Burundi
- ZANU-PF in Zimbabwe

==== Americas ====
- Communist Party of Cuba
- Liberal Party (Brazil, 2006)
- Republican Party of Chile
- Republican Party (United States), especially the Trumpist wing
- United Socialist Party of Venezuela

==== Asia-Pacific ====
- (China) Chinese Communist Party
- Communist Party of Vietnam
- Gerindra Party in Indonesia
- Katipunan ng Demokratikong Pilipino in Philippines
- Kuomintang in Republic of China (Taiwan)
- (Laos) Lao People's Revolutionary Party
- Liberal Democratic Party (Japan)
- One Nation in Australia

==== Europe ====
- Alternative for Germany
- (Denmark) Danish People's Party, which provided parliamentary support for the centre-right governing coalition led by Venstre Party (2001–2011, 2015–2019)
- National Alliance, a member of the governing coalition in Latvia (since 2016)
- Party for Freedom in Netherlands
- Progress Party in Norway
- Reform UK in the United Kingdom
- Slovak National Party, a member of the governing coalition in Slovakia (2016–2020)
- Sweden Democrats
- Swiss People's Party, a member of the governing coalition in Switzerland (since 1929)
- Flemish Vlaams Belang in Belgium
- We Are Family, a member of the governing coalition in Slovakia (assumed office in 2020)

== See also ==
- Alt-right
- Anti-globalization movement
- Christian right
- Conservative wave
- Ethnic nationalism
  - Japanese nationalism
- European Alliance of People and Nations
- Political influence of Evangelicalism in Latin America
- Evangelical political parties in Latin America
- Far-right politics
- Illiberal democracy
- National conservatism
- Neoconservatism
- Neoliberalism
- Neopopulism
- Nippon Kaigi
- Paleoconservatism
- Pan-nationalism
- Pasokification
- Post-fascism
- Radical right (disambiguation)
- Right-wing antiglobalism
- Right-wing populism
- The Movement
- Third wave of autocratization
- Traditional conservatism
- Trumpism
- Ultranationalism
