= Pasokification =

Term describing the decline of social-democratic parties in Europe

Logo of the PASOK party in Greece. The sharp decline of PASOK's popularity in the 2010s led to the creation of the term Pasokification.

Pasokification is a neologism used to describe the decline in vote share for centre-left and social-democratic political parties in Europe and other Western countries during the 2010s, often accompanied by the rise of nationalistic and left and right-wing populist political parties. The share of votes for centre-left parties in Europe was at a 70-year low in 2015.

Pasokification originates from the PASOK party of Greece whose vote share in national elections reduced from 43.9% in 2009 to 4.7% in 2015, while the anti-austerity left-wing Syriza party saw a simultaneous growth in vote share and influence. Since PASOK's decline, the term has been applied to declines of other centre-left, social democratic and Third Way parties within a similar timeframe.

In the early 2020s, some centre-left parties such as the New Zealand Labour Party, Social Democratic Party of Germany, Australian Labor Party and UK Labour Party won elections in each of their countries in 2020, 2021, 2022 and 2024 respectively. Additionally, PASOK-KINAL improved their performance in the 2023 Greek elections. This has resulted in discussions on the possibility of a "de-Pasokification", "reverse Pasokification", or "Kinalification" trend.

== Background ==
Pasokification originates from the Panhellenic Socialist Movement (PASOK) of Greece, which was formerly the largest centre-left party in the Hellenic Parliament between 1977 and 2012, and the dominant party in Greece from 1981 to 2004. PASOK's vote share in national elections reduced from 43.9% in 2009 to 13.2% in May 2012, to 12.3% in June 2012, to 4.7% in January 2015 — due to its perceived poor handling of the Greek government-debt crisis and implementation of harsh austerity measures. Simultaneously, PASOK was replaced as Greece's main left-wing party by Syriza, an anti-austerity party founded in 2004, that saw a consistent growth in vote share and influence.

PASOK's rapid decline in Greece led to comparisons with similar declines in vote share by centre-left, social democratic, and Third Way parties across Europe during the 2010s.

== In Europe ==
=== Austria ===
The Social Democratic Party of Austria (SPÖ) had its vote share reduced from 26.9% in 2017 to 21.2% in 2019, resulting in a loss of 5.7 percentage points in two years. The SPÖ's main rival, the centre-right conservative Austrian People's Party (ÖVP), gained 6 percentage points with a share of 37.5%, its best since 2002.

The 2024 election saw the SPÖ win just 21.1%, a reduction of 0.1 percentage points, marking its worst result ever since the restoration of democracy after World War II in 1945. The far-right Freedom Party of Austria (FPÖ) placed first, winning 28.8% of the vote and achieving its best result in the party's history. The governing ÖVP lost 19 seats, while its coalition partner, left-wing The Greens, lost 10 seats. The centrist NEOS improved from 2019, rising from 15 to 18 seats.

The SPÖ's declining vote share has been attributed to growing anti-immigration sentiment in Austria, and a number of internal disputes between "left-wing" and "right-wing" factions within the party over the issue.

=== Bulgaria ===
The Bulgarian Socialist Party (BSP) has seen its vote share fluctuate wildly since the restoration of democracy in 1990, but its vote share has been consistently low since the political crisis in Bulgaria that began in 2021. The BSP won 27.2% in 2017 and 15% in April 2021, a loss of 12.2 percentage points and falling from 80 to 43 seats in the National Assembly. The BSP's vote share has remained low in the frequent subsequent elections: it lost another 1.6 percentage points winning just 36 seats in July 2021, and a further 3.27 percentage points winning 26 seats in November 2021. It won a record low of 6.8% with 19 seats in June 2024. The BSP increased its vote share by 0.1 percentage points four months later in October 2024, entering into a predominantly right-wing coalition government as part of the BSP – United Left.

The BSP's poor performance since 2021 has been attributed to internal disputes within the party, including a perceived straying away from socialist principles towards a more centrist position and disagreements on certain social issues.

=== Croatia ===
The Social Democratic Party of Croatia (SPD) saw its vote share decline in the 2010s after being elected into government with 61 of 151 seats in the Croatian Parliament in 2011,. It won 32.3% of the vote with 42 seats in 2015, a loss of 8.1 percentage points and 19 seats in the Croatian Parliament. This further decreased to 33.8% and 38 seats in 2016. The SDP won 18.7% in the 2019 European Parliament election, their worst election result for the European Parliament, though it gained 2 seats. The SDP won 24.9% in 2020 parliamentary election, winning 33 seats, their worst parliamentary election result since 2003. In the first round of the 2019–20 presidential election, SDP candidate Zoran Milanović received the party's worst result since 2000, but ultimately won the second round. The SPD's vote share increased slightly to 25.4% with 38 seats in 2024.

The SPD's poor performance since 2011 has been attributed to internal disputes, particularly heated clashes between supporters of Peđa Grbin and Davor Bernardić which resulted in several MPs being expelled from the party. The Social Democrats was founded by former SPD members in 2022.

=== Czech Republic ===
Social Democracy (SOCDEM), known as the Czech Social Democratic Party (CSSD) until 2023, saw a total collapse in support during the 2010s. The CSSD won 20.5% of the vote with 50 of 200 seats in the Chamber of Deputies in 2013, which dropped to 7.3% with 15 seats in 2017. The CSSD won 4.7% with no seats in 2021, dropping below the 5% threshold required for representation in the Chamber of Deputies, slipping to a further 4.3% and no seats in 2024. The far-left Communist Party of Bohemia and Moravia also fell below the threshold in 2021. SOCDEM has had one seat in the Senate of the Czech Republic since 2022. Membership of the party since 1990 has dropped from a peak of 24,497 in 2009 to 3,090 in 2025. Meanwhile, in 2024, the right-wing ANO won 80 seats, the centre-right Civic Democratic Party won 52 seats, and the liberal Mayors and Independents won 22 seats.

SOCDEM's extremely poor performance since 2017 has been attributed to a growth of anti-establishment and anti-immigration sentiment in the Czech Republic, losing voters to ANO and other parties with popular social-democratic policies but stronger stances against immigration.

=== France ===
The Socialist Party (PS) was the largest left-wing party in France from the 1970s until the 2010s, and used to be one of the two major political parties in the country. PS has seen a steep decline since its victory in the 2012 presidential election, which has been described as an example of Pasokification. By 2016, President François Hollande's approval rating was just 4%, and he became the first president in the history of the Fifth Republic not to run for re-election. Hollande's unpopularity drew from his pursuit of "pro-business" and austerity policies after running on a left-wing platform. PS presidential candidate Benoît Hamon suffered an historically poor result in the 2017 presidential election, placing fifth with 6.4% of the vote, behind Jean-Luc Mélenchon of the left-wing populist La France Insoumise. In the 2017 legislative election a month later, PS suffered the worst losses of any party, falling from 280 to 30 seats. The PS-led centre-left faction received 9.5% of the vote during the first round and only 45 seats overall. In the 2019 European elections, PS allied with a number of minor centre-left parties, but still placed only sixth. It became the smallest party to win seats, receiving 6.2% of the vote. It was surpassed by both the left-wing Europe Ecology – The Greens and La France Insoumise. In the 2022 French presidential election, PS candidate Anne Hidalgo received only 1.7% of the vote. In the legislative elections, France's leftist forces combined into one electoral unit called NUPES, anticipating fallout from poor results in the years prior.

In the 2024 snap French legislative elections - called by centrist President Emmanuel Macron due to strong results for the far-right National Rally in the 2024 European Parliament elections - NUPES was abandoned due to differences on foreign policy triggered by the Israeli invasion of Gaza in 2023. A new similar alliance called the New Popular Front (NFP) manifested comprising the main left-wing parties in France, with the distinction that they did not declare a candidate for Prime Minister. While NFP did not win a majority, they surprisingly emerged as the single biggest party, having employed an informal cooperation agreement with Macron's renamed Renaissance party to defeat the apparently ascendant far-right.

The Socialist Party's decline has been attributed to growing division among the left-wing in France, the unpopularity of Hollande's presidency, and the appeal of alternative parties on the centre and right-wing for its traditional voters.

=== Finland ===
The Social Democratic Party of Finland (SDP) began to lose votes in 2007, winning 21.4% of the vote and 45 of 200 seats in the Parliament of Finland, slipping to 19.1% with 42 seats in 2011. The SDP achieved their worst results to date in 2015 winning 16.5% with 34 seats, becoming the fourth-largest party in parliament. Although they managed to become the strongest force in 2019 for the first time in a decade, they also had their second worst success in their history, with 17.7% and 40 seats. Despite another increase in the vote share 19.9% with 43 seats in 2023, the SDP lost power to a coalition of the centre-right National Coalition Party and right-wing Finns Party.

The SDP had been declining for decades on the municipal level, having been the party with the most seats of representation in municipal councils as well as the top vote share from the 1950s to 2000. Following the 2008 municipal elections, the National Coalition Party became the strongest in terms of the vote share and the Centre Party has had the most individual representatives, partly due to dominance in agrarian and rural based municipalities. Additionally, the general decline of SDP's vote share in municipal elections can perhaps be explained by the overall decline of the number of municipalities from roughly 600 in the 1940s to about 500 in 1970 and the mid 300s in the early 2000s. The SDP performed very well in the 2025 municipal elections, their best result since 2004, suggesting that the party was able to defy the Pasokification trend. This has been at least partly attributed to the winning voters from the Finns Party due to their support for austerity measures to curb deficit spending, which proved to be highly unpopular and was strongly opposed by the SDP.

The Åland Social Democrats nearly halved their vote share between 2011 and 2019, from 18.5% to 9.1%, respectively, though they did experience a minor recovery to 12.8% in 2023.

=== Germany ===
The Social Democratic Party of Germany (SPD) has been cited as an example of Pasokification as its popularity has waned since the late 2000s, particularly in the 2009 federal election, when it recorded its worst result since before World War II. The SPD's post-2005 decline has been attributed to its decision to enter into grand coalitions with its traditional rival, the centre-right conservative Christian Democratic Union (CDU/CSU). Despite a small recovery in 2013/14, the SPD's decline continued through the late 2010s, winning just 20.5% of the vote in the 2017 federal election. Similarly poor results have been recorded in local and state elections across the country. The SPD won just 15.8% of the vote in the 2019 European Parliament election, falling to third place in a national election for the first time in its history. This decline was somewhat halted however as the SPD won the most seats in the 2021 federal election with 25.7% of the vote, although this was the smallest vote share of a first-placed party in an election in post-war Germany. The 2021 election also brought with it a much higher vote share for the left-wing Green Party, and resulted in a left-liberal traffic-light coalition (SPD-GRÜNE-FDP) taking power.

In the 2025 German federal election, the SPD received just 16.4% of the vote, falling below 20% in one of the worst results in its history. This was a worse result than even March 1933, when the Nazis had taken power, and only better than the 1887 election held 138 years earlier during the German Empire.

The SPD's decline has been attributed to losing voters to other parties due to growing anti-establishment and anti-immigration sentiment in Germany, divisions within the German left-wing, and internal disputes between "left-wing" and "right-wing" factions over party policy.

In 2017, author and former SPD politician Susanne Gaschke published an analysis of the SPD's decline: SPD: A Party Between Burnout and Euphoria.

=== Greece ===
PASOK was once the dominant centre-left party in Greece. PASOK received just 4.8% and 6.3% of the vote in the 2015 January and September Greek legislative elections respectively, due to its enforcement of harsh austerity measures in the wake of the European debt crisis, which, along with the ensuing Great Recession, led to massive social unrest and economic collapse, with much of its former electorate going to the anti-austerity Syriza. Following a series of austerity and bailout packages, implemented despite rejection in the 2015 Greek bailout referendum, resulting in several splits within the party, Syriza was defeated in the 2019 legislative election while the social democratic alliance Movement for Change (KINAL, which includes PASOK and minor centre-left movements) rebounded to 8.1% and gained 22 seats.

=== Hungary ===
The Hungarian Socialist Party (MSZP) lost significant support in 2010 which resulted in a loss of 133 seats in the National Assembly, falling from 192 of 384 seats to 59 with 28.3% of the vote. It suffered defeat again in the 2014, 2018, and 2022, falling to 15 seats. These election losses culminated in the rise of the right-wing Fidesz–KDNP alliance.

The MSZP's decline occurred after a series of corruption scandals affected Prime Minister Ferenc Gyurcsány's government and its perceived poor management of the Great Recession in Hungary.

=== Iceland ===
The Social Democratic Alliance (SDA) was formed in 1999 to unite the fragmented left-wing in Iceland. In its first decade it established itself as the second-strongest force behind the right-wing Independence Party, debuting at 26.8% in 1999 and improving to 31.0% in 2003. The SDA became the largest party in the country in the 2009 election with 29.8%. However, it suffered a major defeat in 2013 with 12.9%. They were reduced to just 5.7% in 2016, becoming the smallest of seven parties in parliament, and were surpassed by the Left-Green Movement as the strongest left-wing party in Iceland. This was the worst ever result for the SDA or its predecessor party, the Social Democratic Party, since they first ran for election in August 1916, when they won 6.8%. The SDA achieved a minor recovery in 2017 with 12.1%, though they remained a minor force behind the Left-Greens, whose leader Katrín Jakobsdóttir went on to become Prime Minister of Iceland. However, this recovery was short-lived, with the party winning 9.9% in 2021. In the 2024, however, the party rebounded to 20.8% and managed to form a government with its leader Kristrún Frostadóttir as prime minister.

=== Ireland ===
The Labour Party received 6.6% of the vote in 2016, falling from 33 to 7 seats out of 158 in the Dáil Éireann, down from 19.5% in 2011. This fell further to 4.4% in the 2020 general election — their worst result since 1987 — while the left-wing nationalist Sinn Féin had its best result since 1922. Labour saw a minor recovery in 2024 with 4.6% and 11 seats.

=== Italy ===
The Democratic Party (PD) started to lose support by the late 2000s in the Po Valley. The first election in which the Democratic Party lost to a more radical party was the 2010 Venetian regional election (20.34% of the vote, compared to the 35.16% obtained by Lega Nord). The party's 18.8% vote share in the 2018 Italian general election meant it lost 185 seats in the Chamber of Deputies and 58 seats in the Senate, falling from the largest to the third-largest faction in the Italian parliament. This was particularly dramatic considering that the party received more than 40% of vote just four year prior, in the 2014 European Parliament election in Italy, and is commonly attributed to its enforcement of austerity measures, a poor economic recovery and a failed attempt to move towards a two-party system in the 2016 Italian constitutional referendum. However, the party still came in second place in the popular vote and entered government in September 2019 with the Five Star Movement after the collapse of the previous Conte I Cabinet. After the collapse of the second Conte government in January 2021, the PD joined the new government of national unity led by Mario Draghi, former director of the European Central Bank. After the latter's crisis in summer 2022 and the general elections in October (which saw a landslide victory for right-wing parties), the Democratic Party returned to opposition but still remained the second most voted party.

=== Lithuania ===
The Social Democratic Party of Lithuania received 9.59% of the vote in the 2020 Lithuanian parliamentary election, down from 15.04% in 2016 and 18.37% in 2012. The party rebounded to 19.32% in the 2024 election and formed a government led by it in the election's aftermath.

=== Luxembourg ===
The Luxembourg Socialist Workers' Party (LSAP) received 20.2% of the vote in the 2013 Luxembourg general election, their lowest support since the 1931 general election. This decreased further to 17.60% in the 2018 general election, ranking third for number of seats for the first time since 1999. However, the LSAP has been part of Luxembourg's coalition governments since the 2013 election.

=== Netherlands ===
The social-democratic Labour Party received 5.7% of the vote in the 2017 Dutch general election, down from 24.8% in the 2012 general election. This remained unchanged at the 2021 election.

The Labour party then emerged in first place in the 2019 European Parliament election in the Netherlands. Since 2023, the party has been in an electoral alliance with GroenLinks named GroenLinks–PvdA; the parties formally merged on 1 July 2026 to form Progressive Netherlands. The electoral alliance finished second in the 2023 general election before falling back to fourth in the 2025 general election.

=== Norway ===
Before the 1997 parliamentary elections, Labour Party (Ap) leader Thorbjørn Jagland infamously promised that if, should his party get less than 36,9% of the votes, his government would step down. The final results gave Ap merely 35,0%, and paved the way for a centrist minority government. This coalition government fell in March 2000 after a vote of no confidence, whereafter Ap again formed a government supported by the Centre Party and the Socialist Left Party. This government only lasted until the 2001 elections however, when they lost it to the same centrist coalition. In this election, Ap got only 24.3% of the votes, their worst electoral result since 1924.

Support for the party soon rebounded slightly, but has been steadily declining since the 2013 election. Despite their victory in the 2021 Norwegian parliamentary election, where they scored 26,3% of the votes, the party lost a seat and were briefly in third-place behind the Conservative Party and the Centre Party in pre-election polls. After forming a minority government with the Centre Party in October 2021, the support for Ap has dropped drastically in the polls, scoring as low as 15,5% in March 2023. Parallel to this drop in support, the Norwegian radical left, represented by the Red Party and Socialist Left Party has seen increased support in the polls. The Red Party also managed to break the electoral threshold of 4% for the first time since its formation in the 2021 elections, gaining 8 mandates in the Storting.

The 2023 local elections was the first local or national election since 1924 in which Ap was not the largest party in Norway. Before the elections, Ap held the mayoralty in 37 out of the 50 most populous municipalities, a number which fell to 6 in the aftermath of the election. They lost the governing mayors in Oslo and Bergen, as well as the mayors in major municipalities like Trondheim, Stavanger, Kristiansand, Drammen and Fredrikstad. They also lost the mayoralty in the traditional Labour stronghold of Sarpsborg, an office held by Ap since 1913.

However, in the 2025 election, Labour made a stunning comeback having lagged in the polls for most of the previous term, increasing its vote share by 1.1% to 28%, and formed another minority government.

=== Poland ===
The Democratic Left Alliance became only third during the rise of the liberal Civic Platform since 2003 following the Rywin affair. In 2015 they only got 7.55% and lost all seats but returned into the Sejm in 2019 and did not enter the government until 2023 when New Left (merger of Spring and the Democratic Left Alliance) entered Tusk's third cabinet as a junior coalition partner.

=== Spain ===
The 2015 Spanish general election produced the worst results for the social-democratic Spanish Socialist Workers' Party (PSOE) since the Spanish transition to democracy in the 1970s, as the party received 22% of the vote, losing support to Unidas Podemos. The PSOE returned to government following the 2018 vote of no confidence in the government of Mariano Rajoy and, in the April 2019 general election, became the largest party since 2008 and obtained its best result since 2011 with 28.7% of the vote. The party lost support in the November election, but increased their vote share to 31.7% in 2023.

=== Sweden ===
The Swedish Social Democratic Party averaged 45.3% of the votes in half of all general elections between the mid-1930s and mid-1980s, making it one of the most successful political parties in the history of the liberal democratic world. In the 1968 election, the Social Democrats even won an outright majority with 50.12% of the votes. In the late 1990s, the party began to receive just under 40% of the votes. After the 2010 Swedish general election, their vote share dramatically declined, some of these votes being lost to the right-wing populist party Sweden Democrats. In the 2018 general election, the Social Democrats' only received 28.3% of the votes, its lowest level since 1908.

=== United Kingdom ===
==== England (and national Westminster) ====
In 2015, the national Labour Party elected Jeremy Corbyn as their leader. Corbyn's leadership has been characterized as more left-wing than that of his predecessors of the New Labour era. In the 2017 general election, Labour stalled their long decline by increasing their vote share for the first time since 2001 and achieving 40% of the vote, seemingly challenging the conception that a more radical leadership would be highly unsuccessful in elections. However, the 2019 general election resulted in a catastrophic defeat in which the governing Conservative Party — led by Boris Johnson — won many long-held Labour seats in the party's traditional English and Welsh heartlands (sometimes described as the 'Red Wall'). Labour's policy for a second Brexit referendum and the unpopularity of Jeremy Corbyn were listed as reasons for the defeat in subsequent polling.

Corbyn was succeeded as party leader in April 2020 by Keir Starmer. In May 2021, Starmer failed to improve on the party's fortunes in a 'bumper' set of local and devolved parliamentary elections (taking place due to Mayoral and local races being postponed due to COVID-19 in 2020). Among the failures was another loss in the 'Red Wall' Hartlepool by-election for the Westminster parliament to the Conservative candidate by nearly 7,000 votes. Hartlepool had previously been held by Labour under Corbyn twice in 2017 and 2019, considered low points for Labour. The Conservative victory has largely been attributed to large numbers of former Brexit Party and UKIP supporters switching to the Conservatives - rather than the 'successor' to the Brexit Party, the Reform party - as well as many Labour supporters supporting third-party or independent candidates.

Following a scandal known as 'Partygate' as well as a range of sleaze scandals, Boris Johnson stepped down as prime minister in 2022, marking the first UK government crisis of 2022. He was succeeded by Liz Truss who won out in a crowded field to succeed Johnson. Truss's libertarian economic policy set out in the September 2022 mini-budget was perceived to be quite radical. The budget was widely attributed as the cause for a subsequent significant rise in mortgage rates, and caused Liz Truss to leave her post after just 49 days in office. By this time, Labour had overtaken the Conservatives in polling quite dramatically, but this did not lead to an immediate election.

In the July 2024 General Election, Labour did not significantly increase their vote share across the country as a whole, but they benefitted from two unusual factors which played in their favour: 1. more conservative stances from some Labour politicians relocated the vote towards rural and town areas which Labour struggled in beforehand, slightly increasing their vote share, 2. Nigel Farage rejoined and led the Reform UK Party, which subsequently won 14.2% (but just 5 seats) of the vote nationally (concentrated in rural and coastal areas), gifting many previously uncompetitive seats to Labour in England due to the SMDP electoral system. The result was a significant Labour parliamentary victory all three British nations, winning 411 seats (63.23%), while the Conservatives held just 123 seats (18.2%), the largest victory for any party since the 1997 Labour landslide.

While Labour currently hold a significant majority in the UK Parliament, their electoral security remains unclear. Labour won just 33.7% of votes in the 2024 election, and have struggled to get above 25% in polls since while the Liberal Democrats won 12.2% (and won 72 seats), the Greens won 6.7% (and won 4 seats) and a range of independent candidates won rhetorically significant races against Labour candidates. This included the victory of 4 candidates who campaigned heavily around the Israeli invasion of Gaza. The most notable of these was Shockat Adam, who unseated senior Labour spokesperson Jonathan Ashworth. LSE economist Faiza Shaheen - who was previously a Labour candidate but was deselected at the last minute in favour of NEC-preferred candidate Shama Tatler - split the vote between herself and Labour against Iain Duncan Smith as an Independent candidate. Jeremy Corbyn, former leader of the Labour Party, also won a significant victory against the imposed Labour candidate in Islington North.

The elected independent MPs moved to form the Independent Alliance in Parliament. Following political differences, Jeremy Corbyn and former Labour MP Zarah Sultana formed a new party named Your Party, designed to be a party to the left of Labour. Sultana claimed that the Independent Alliance was sexist, and stoked significant controversy by attempting to launch Your Party without consulting Corbyn. Your Party has failed to achieve significant momentum due to organisational disarray despite impressive victories in 2024 which could be maintained in the next election due to controversies over the Labour Party's handling of the war in Gaza in government. At present, Your Party does not appear on national polling, largely subsumed by a resurgent Labour Party and the Green Party of England and Wales.

The Green Party, which only held one seat in the House of Commons from 2010 to 2024, experienced a significant rise in support following Prime Minister Keir Starmer's perceived failures to deal with the war in Gaza. Zack Polanski, current Leader of the Green Party has made a deliberate outreach to voters alienated by Labour's controversial foreign policy positions. Since Polanski's election as leader, the party's membership has more than tripled; it has seen a significant increase of support in polling, notably from voters dissatisfied with the abandonment of policies and changes in direction by the Labour Party. Their youth wing, the Young Greens of England and Wales, has risen in membership to 50,000, becoming Europe's largest youth wing.

Between November 2025 and the election of Andy Burnham as Leader of the Labour Party and Prime Minister in Summer 2026, the Greens had surpassed both Labour and the Conservatives in varying polls, gaining a significant lead on them by March 2026. By around late March to early April 2026, the Greens overtook both Labour and the Conservatives in the aggregate of national polls for the first time, this was also the first time ever that the top 2 parties in the polls were neither the governing nor official opposition party. Current polling shows that the Greens have significantly stalled, likely due to the replacement of Keir Starmer as Prime Minister with Andy Burnham who is perceived to be more left-leaning.

==== Scotland ====
Scottish Labour held the majority of Scotland's Westminster seats from the 1964 United Kingdom general election until the 2015 United Kingdom general election in Scotland, where the Scottish National Party (SNP) won 56 of the 59 available seats. The SNP then fell to 35 seats at the 2017 general election in Scotland and rose to 48 in the 2019 general election in Scotland. Scottish Labour had lost support since the creation of the Scottish Parliament. The party got 33.6% of the votes in the 1999 Scottish Parliament election and 19.1% of the votes in the 2016 Scottish Parliament election. This allowed the SNP to overtake Scottish Labour by 2015. Labour won the majority of Scottish Westminster seats in 2024, winning 35% of the vote compared to the SNP's 30%, though they failed to replicate the result in the 2026 Scottish Parliament election, where the SNP again won a plurality of seats.

Scotland is seen as a traditional Labour voting base due to the industrial heritage of Scottish cities - most famously shipbuilding on the Clyde and the oil and gas industry linked to Aberdeen. Labour was perceived as struggling to balance the ideals of these groups with the net zero positions it has taken in recent years.

Andy Burnham, made Prime Minister in Summer 2026, has discussed his personal affinity with Scottish First Minister John Swinney of the SNP. Both had worked closely together as devolved leaders, with Burnham having previously been Mayor of Greater Manchester. Burnham promised to review the arrangements for Scotland and Wales as part of a new devolved settlement, but maintained a staunchly unionist position overall.

==== Wales ====
Pasokification did not take place in Wales until 2026, Welsh Labour consistently held the Welsh devolved government derived from the Senedd (Welsh Assembly/Parliament) from when it was first established in 1999 until 2026. It is practically impossible for any one party to win an outright majority in the Welsh electoral system - a combination of SMDP and an adjusted regional list vote known as AMS. However, Welsh Labour won a working-majority (30/60 seats) a number of times, including in the May 2021 Senedd elections where their English and Scottish equivalents underperformed in local and national elections. Welsh Labour's success was credited to their adoption of 'clear red water'; a strategy which saw them resist privatisation and distance themselves from the national Labour party.The share of Labour seats from Wales in the Westminster House of Commons has slightly declined since 1945. Labour lost some vote share in Wales in 2024, but gained 9 seats, mostly due to the Conservative-Reform split.

In the 2026 Senedd Election, Welsh Labour were reduced to 9 seats out of 96 with just 11% of the vote, losing to the pro-Welsh independence Plaid Cymru (Welsh for: The Party (Plaid) of Wales (Cymru)). This was the first time Welsh Labour had lost the Senedd since its inception, the loss was credited to their abandonment of clear red water, a political strategy of differentiating the Welsh Labour Party from the UK-wide one.

The events following the resignation of Mark Drakeford, the more left-leaning First Minister from 2018 to 2024, resulted in a collapse of Labour's backing in the region due to his replacement with Vaughan Gething, a First Minister more strongly linked to the UK Labour leadership. Though Gething's successor, Eluned Morgan, attempted to revive the independent identity of Welsh Labour, the strategy was not successful.

The rise in support for Plaid Cymru also followed the 2025 Caerphilly by-election, where Plaid Cymru roundly defeated Reform UK with 47% of the vote to Reform's 36%. Support subsequently consolidated nationally for the independentist party, linked in media commentary to concerns that Labour was not capable of defeating Reform UK due to a rallying effect to Plaid Cymru, and the risk of splitting the vote.

==== Northern Ireland ====
The Social Democratic and Labour Party in Northern Ireland consistently lost votes between 1998 and 2022, coinciding with an increase in the influence of Sinn Féin.

==== Dependent territories ====
The Manx Labour Party has been in decline since 2001, and even lost their representation in the House of Keys in 2016. It gained two seats in the 2021 elections. Most candidates on the Isle of Man are Independents.

Gibraltar has not undergone a process of Pasokification. The long-term alliance of the Gibraltar Socialist Labour Party and the Gibraltar Liberal Party has persisted since 2003. The GSLP was only founded in 1980, making it a relatively young social democratic party in Western Europe.

Few overseas British territories have active social democratic or labour movements. This may be because there are few distinct social cleavages among islanders for them to campaign on.

== Outside of Europe ==
=== Bolivia ===
The once dominant Movimiento al Socialismo received just 3.17% of the vote in the 2025 Bolivian general election, their lowest support since the party's foundation. MAS was wiped out in the Chamber of Senators (Bolivia) and won just 2 seats in the Chamber of Deputies, losing 73 seats.

=== Israel ===
The Israeli Labor Party and its predecessor Mapai were dominant in Israeli politics from the founding of the nation in 1948 to 1977. Since then, its popularity has been gradually decreasing, especially since the start of the 21st century. In the 2020 election the party only gained 3 seats as part of Labor-Gesher-Meretz coalition, being in acute danger of altogether disappearing, but slightly rebounded and got 7 seats in the 2021 election, which allowed it to join the multi-party government.

In 2022, the party barely passed the electoral threshold of 3.25% and gained 4 seats. The party would be dissolved by 2024, merging with Meretz to form The Democrats.

=== Sri Lanka ===
The social-democratic Sri Lanka Freedom Party lost the 2015 Sri Lankan presidential election to party defector Maithripala Sirisena, who campaigned on a broad alliance led by the United National Party against the decade-long rule of the Freedom Party's leader Mahinda Rajapaksa, who faced allegations of corruption and nepotism. The following 2015 Sri Lankan parliamentary election saw the formation of a national government, which soon faced major infighting. Rajapaksa went on to form a new party, Sri Lanka Podujana Peramuna (SLPP), and successfully contested several local government elections. gaining 40.47% of the votes; the Sri Lanka Freedom Party only gained 12.10%, while the United National Party gained 29.42%.

The SLPP nominated Rajapaksa's younger brother Gotabaya Rajapaksa for the 2019 Sri Lankan presidential election, who gained 52.25% against the United National Party candidate Sajith Premadasa (who gained 41.99%). Gotabaya Rajapaksa contested on a pro-nationalistic, economic development and national security platform. Sri Lanka Freedom Party had hoped to have its own candidate for the presidential election, but eventually opted to support the SLPP.

=== South Africa ===
South Africa is considered a dominant-party state, with the center-left African National Congress providing all of South Africa's presidents since 1994. However, the ANC's electoral majority has declined consistently since 2004, and in the 2021 local elections, its share of the national vote dropped below 50% for the first time ever. The party has been embroiled in a number of controversies, particularly relating to widespread allegations of political corruption among its members. Following the 2024 general election, the ANC lost its majority in parliament for the first time in South Africa's democratic history. It still remains the largest party, with under 41% of the vote. The party also lost its majority in Kwa-Zulu Natal, Gauteng and Northern Cape.

=== Latin America ===
Following the pink tide, where left wing and center-left wing parties In Latin America were successful, a conservative wave happened from the mid-2010s to the early 2020s as a direct reaction to the pink tide. Although the extent to which the Latin American leftist parties which have also suffered setbacks are located in the social democratic tradition is contested.

== See also ==
- Conservative wave
