= Neopopulism =

21st-century wave of right-wing populism

Neopopulism commonly refers to the new wave of populism, primarily right-wing populism, that has emerged internationally following the Great Recession during the first decade of the 21st century. By analogy, just as the Great Depression of 1929 was followed by the rise of fascism in Europe during the 1930s, the Great Recession of 2008 created an environment for new right-wing populist parties that have gained increasing ground and influence, mainly in Europe, but also in other regions of the world. In Latin America neopopulism describes the rise of left wing parties (Pink tide) and also right-wing parties (Conservative wave).

The new populism presents itself through a political agent that is disruptive with respect to the traditional parties established in the political system, antagonizing them and sometimes feigning ideological ambiguity –refusing to identify as left or right–, although the core of its message focuses on an anti-establishment approach and it strives to inaugurate political methods that seek to distance themselves from what usually exists in the political arena.

== Characteristics and historical background ==
Claudio Katz has pointed out that, so far, the main difference between the new radicalized and populist right and the fascism of the last century is the massification of violence. In the past, armed militias deployed unprecedented organized violence that later became state terrorism. Whereas, in the case of the new populist right-wing emergence, hostility towards minorities, aggression against dissidents, and hate speech have not yet resulted in political assassinations, purges, massacres, and other open expressions of intolerance and authoritarianism, but remain a possibility. Another important difference is the acceptance, at least nominally, of republican norms and the democratic system, a matter which, although it may have its limitations, has, again, remained the norm so far.

These political forms are not limited to the European experience; similar manifestations can be found in almost every region of the world. The democratic upheaval of the Arab Spring was followed by an ongoing period of conflict and Counter-revolutionaries — the Arab Winter — embodied in militant Islamist groups that have sought to reinstate dictatorial regimes and authoritarian forms of government throughout the region, with clear intolerant attitudes toward secularism and pluralistic religious coexistence. In Latin America, on the other hand, the temporal gap between European fascisms in power and the analogous experiences in this region has been noted, as their emergence here was accompanied by repression (Represión), persecution, and attempts to destroy leftist projects. In Chile, Pinochetism as a regime had some anti-worker social base fuelled by anti-communist fervor, as did the other anti-democratic regimes that came to power through Operation Condor. This is one of the points that, according to Claudio Katz, has made the discussion about the fascist experience in the rest of the world disappear, erroneously assuming that fascism in power, strictly speaking, only occurred in Europe.

But it is forgotten that this reactionary current adopted forms of dependent fascism when the ruling classes of the periphery faced significant threats to their domination. The chronological difference between the two scenarios does not alter these similarities. The peaks of fascism in the periphery occurred during the Cold War, not in 1930–45. This shift in virulent regressive responses was consistent with the geographical mutation of popular uprisings and included massacres of the same magnitude as those recorded in Europe. It suffices to recall, for example, that the crushing of communism in Indonesia claimed a million lives

The changes that occurred after the end of World War II and the collapse of the Eastern Bloc are considered defining moments in the widespread acceptance of liberal democracy as the ideal political model for nations. Consequently, this new populism ostensibly sets goals that do not publicly aspire to overthrow this model, but rather are built around an aversion to a wide variety of specific objectives that share certain common aspects: immigration, multiculturalism, international agreements—such as combating climate change — antifeminism, the struggle to re-legitimize racism, ableism, and aporophobia as well as issues that go beyond these and imply an acceptance of the denial of science and logical thought: anti-intellectualism, irrationalism and conspiracy theories.

An additional point concerns the approach to social, economic, and political problems following the Great Recession, as these reactionary and populist manifestations have also been, to a large extent, the expression of sectors seeking solutions to the crises and the resulting degradation of societies, by searching for scapegoats within those same societies. The distinction between this new right and the phenomenon of neo-fascism, on the other hand, is that it does not necessarily endorse the historical figures of conventional fascism—such as Franco, Hitler or Mussolini - since instead it has achieved a certain degree of independence from these roots, although many of its discursive elements persist to this day.

The emergence of this neopopulism has been a challenge for traditional parties and for liberalism itself, as much of its framework has been eroded, potentially even posing an affront to human rights. The disruption of its agenda and the normalization of its discourse will inevitably have some impact on democratic values, the consequences of which remain to be seen, although it is also noted that its potential for growth varies considerably depending on the context and geographical area in which it emerges.

== Europe ==
In Europe, at least since 2000, there has been a growing trend of the emergence of new radical right-wing parties, expressed as a new populist wave of this shift, which have been gaining ground in the electoral and discursive aspects. Populist parties have had strength in the first half of the 21st century. As of the 2020s, particauurly far right parties have grown stronger. Examples of this manifestation have been the strength of Lega Nord, the Alleanza Nazionale, as well as the arrival in government of Giorgia Meloni's Brothers of Italy in Italy in 2022. In Central Europe, the Fidesz of Viktor Orbán in Hungary and Law and Justice in Poland of the Kaczyński brothers have also been characterised. In Poland it has been described as "neo-liberal populism". In the Germanosphere, there is the AfD in Germany and the Austrian People's Party in Austria.

Also included are the Swiss People's Party in Switzerland, the Danish People's Party in Denmark, the Progress Party of Norway, the Belgian Vlaams Blok, the UK Independence Party in Great Britain, Vox in Spain, and the National Rally in France.

The common elements of the rhetoric of this new right-wing populist wave are the pursuit of implementing xenophobic policies, particularly against Muslims; a denunciation of the orthodox political establishment; a conservative and nativist nationalism; an agenda against LGBTQ+ rights; in some cases, the exaltation of the imperialist past —as in France—and a neoliberal economic program. Scholars of the phenomenon differ in their interpretations, ranging from those who believe it is a typically populist phenomenon due to the emergence of charismatic leaders, to those who see signs of a possible resurgence of 20th century fascism, primarily due to hate speech directed against certain social groups— immigrants, ethnic minorities, and the LGBTQ+ movement, as being against traditional values. The authors Moreno Velador and Minutti Sierra summarize that many of these approaches could be described as a kind of reactionary nationalism.

== South America ==
In Latin America, neopopulism is called "Neopopulismo" in Spanish.

In Peru, the government of Alberto Fujimori demonstrated strong communication skills with the lower-middle class, leading American and British academics to conclude that his rule approached the concept of neopopulism. Even so, political scientist Fernando Tuesta referred to him simply as a "populist Caudillo". This is despite the fact that caudillismo had its origins in the early years of the republic. Fujimorism emerged as a product of his extensive rule, which Euronews conceptualized as "neoliberal populism", and his daughter Keiko Fujimori and more recently Dina Boluarte.

In Brazil, after several administrations of the Workers' Party, Jair Bolsonaro came to power following the 2018 Brazilian general election. He conservative voters for his anti-crime stance. He was considered a controversial figure who on several occasions throughout his political career railing against democracy and defending the torture and human rights violations committed by the military dictatorship. According to Pablo Stefanoni, after the fall of the Berlin Wall in 1989, existing socialism disappeared; but what did not disappear was anti-communism. Thus, in the absence of an enemy to identify and combat, the rhetoric of the far right attacked the conspiratorial thesis of Cultural Marxism denounced "Gender ideology and "intensified anti-feminist stances". This was noticeable in the political arena prior to Bolsonaro's rise to power, who also made openly homophobic statements during the campaign and garnered praise from the American strategist Steve Bannon. Both as a candidate and as president, Bolsonaro made constant allusions to carrying out a "purge" against the "reds," and labeled the Landless Workers' Movement and the Homeless Workers' Movement as terrorists. He also promoted various fake news stories and conspiracy theories surrounding an alleged coup attempt. He repeatedly stated that "a police officer who doesn't kill isn't a police officer". He also joined the anti-quarantine movement during the COVID-19 pandemic. His candidacy was supported by evangelical churches promoting prosperity theology, conservative nationalism, and a discourse steeped in Christian fundamentalism. The 2022–2023 Brazilian coup plot against the elected Lula da Silva, led to an occupation of the National Congress and the presidential residence. Bolsonaro denied involvement.

In Argentina, the party La Libertad Avanza (Freedom Advances) emerged, led by Javier Milei emerged in 2023. This party has managed to capitalize on a sector of people dissatisfied with conventional politics. Its leader, Milei, has been characterized by his constant presence in the media and by his confrontational and strident tone in deploying proposals that boast of being a disruptor. Anti-establishment messaging was core to the campaign. Analyst Beatriz Sarlo has described him as a right-wing “utopista" a believer in the supposed idealized virtues of capitalism, with a knack for communicating a simple and superficial message capable of being immediately persuasive to many: “The State is worse than an ordinary thief, because it takes everything from you; politicians are sociopaths, because they want us to believe that we cannot live without them. The State robs us and politicians deceive us”. Social skepticism, distrust of democratic institutions, weariness, apathy, and the lack of active citizen involvement in public affairs also create a fertile ground for the emergence of leaders who offer seemingly easy solutions to problems. In this same vein, Sarlo has pointed out:

Right-wing populism finds the shortcut to excite and win over the disillusioned. It doesn't talk to them about the complexities and conflicts of democracies. On the contrary, it talks to them about the simplicity that could be achieved if we did away with political parties. This simplistic discourse is friendly to citizens who have neither the time nor the inclination to participate in the public sphere and, consequently, prefer a leader who shouts simple phrases.

In Bolivia, was neopopulism was used by RealClearPolitics to describe the ideology of Evo Morales. In Chile, the emergence of José Antonio Kast's Republican Party —described as far-right or right-wing populist—has diminished the presence of traditional right-wing parties, including the historic UDI. In the 2025 Chilean general election, he became the first far right president in 25 years. The Republican Party has, at various times, defended the Pinochet regime and championed security and opposition to immigration as key issues that have garnered it electoral support. It has also adopted as its banners opposition to same-sex marriage, abortion rights, and a radicalized conservative discourse that appeals to traditional values. However, it has combined this with a harshly confrontational discourse toward left-wing parties and launched an attack against what this sector considers political correctness. The party has been compared to Trumpism.

Juan Carlos Ubilluz Raygada argues that, in the case of Latin America, the cultural and historical matrix of radicalized right-wing movements lies in the pre-independence era, given its “oligarchic, colonial, racist, and patrimonial character", and that the authoritarian style of their actions is rooted in the dictatorships of the 20th century. Meanwhile, the model of society they advocate is one aligned with neoliberalism, a watershed moment following the 1973 military coup in Chile and the arrival of the Chicago Boys in South America. Pablo Stefanoni summarizes that: “Throughout Latin America, a new right wing is also emerging, articulating a vote that opposes successes. Racism as a rejection of a racialized view of poverty, and conservatism against the advances of feminism and sexual minorities. The growth of political evangelism and the popularity of politicians and opinion leaders who have declared war on what they call ‘gender ideology’ are some of the vectors for the political expression of an increasingly virulent anti-progressivism”.

== North America ==
In the United States, Donald Trump's rise to power can also be seen as a reactive political consequence of the deindustrialization the country has experienced in recent decades, the defeats of the labor movement, the anti-worker policies supported by Democratic administrations as they mimicked Reaganomics, and the culture war waged successfully by conservatives to undermine the support base of the traditional left. Added to this could be the growing distrust of the public sector and the equally increasing discursive demonization of political adversaries. Although its disruption may have caused surprise, right-wing populism has grown within the Republican Party, demonstrating the current state of this phenomenon with figures other than Trump, such as Ron DeSantis. The emergence of these trends, in all cases, takes advantage to some extent of anti-party rhetoric, staunch opposition to diversity and pluralism, and outright rejection of social change.

The New York Times has described neopopulism as "a bipartisan attitude that mistrusts the free-market ethos instead of embracing it". The phrase neopopulism has also been characterised as "new centrism". These policies have been adopted in different ways by Joe Biden and Donald Trump. David Leonhardt wrote that "neopopulism" can be summarised in 10 principles:

1. Reorientation of fiscal policy toward national goals amid accumulating structural deficits
2. Progressive and pro-family taxation
3. Central-bank-determined interest rates with inflation targets
4. Flexible, market-determined exchange rates favoring weaker currencies
5. Trade barriers and tariffs
6. Capital-inflow controls
7. Industrial policy
8. Bailouts
9. Policymaking via the administrative state
10. Aggressive antitrust-law enforcement

== See also ==
- Populism
- Right-wing populism
- Left-wing populism
- Neoconservatism
- Neo-environmentalism
- Neo-fascism
- Neoliberalism
- Neo-nationalism
- Disinformation
- Indoctrination
- Valence populism

== Bibliography ==
- Louçã, Francisco (2018) «El populismo fascista no ha hecho más que empezar», Viento Sur, 24/10/2018.
- Riley, Dylan (2018). «¿Qué es Trump?» New Left Review 114, enero – febrero 2018.
- Traverso, Enzo (2019). «Interpretar la era de la violencia global», Viento Sur, 23–04–2019.
- Löwy, Michael (2019). «La extrema derecha: Un fenómeno global», Resumen Latinoamericano, 19-1 2019.
- CEPAL (2000) La Cepal en sus 50 años: Notas de un seminario conmemorativo.
- Dietmar, D. (2005) Democracia sin demócratas. Nueva Sociedad197, pp 28–41
- Hermet, G. (2001). Del populismo de los antiguos al populismo de los modernos. México: Colegio de México.
- Laclau,E. (2005) La Razón Populista, FCE, Buenos Aires.
- Mouffe, Ch. (2015). La política popular. Entrevista pública a Chantal Mouffe. Facultad Libre de Rosario. YouTube
- The Long Road from Neoliberalism to Neopopulism in ECE
