= Fairtrade Town =

British grassroots citizen movement

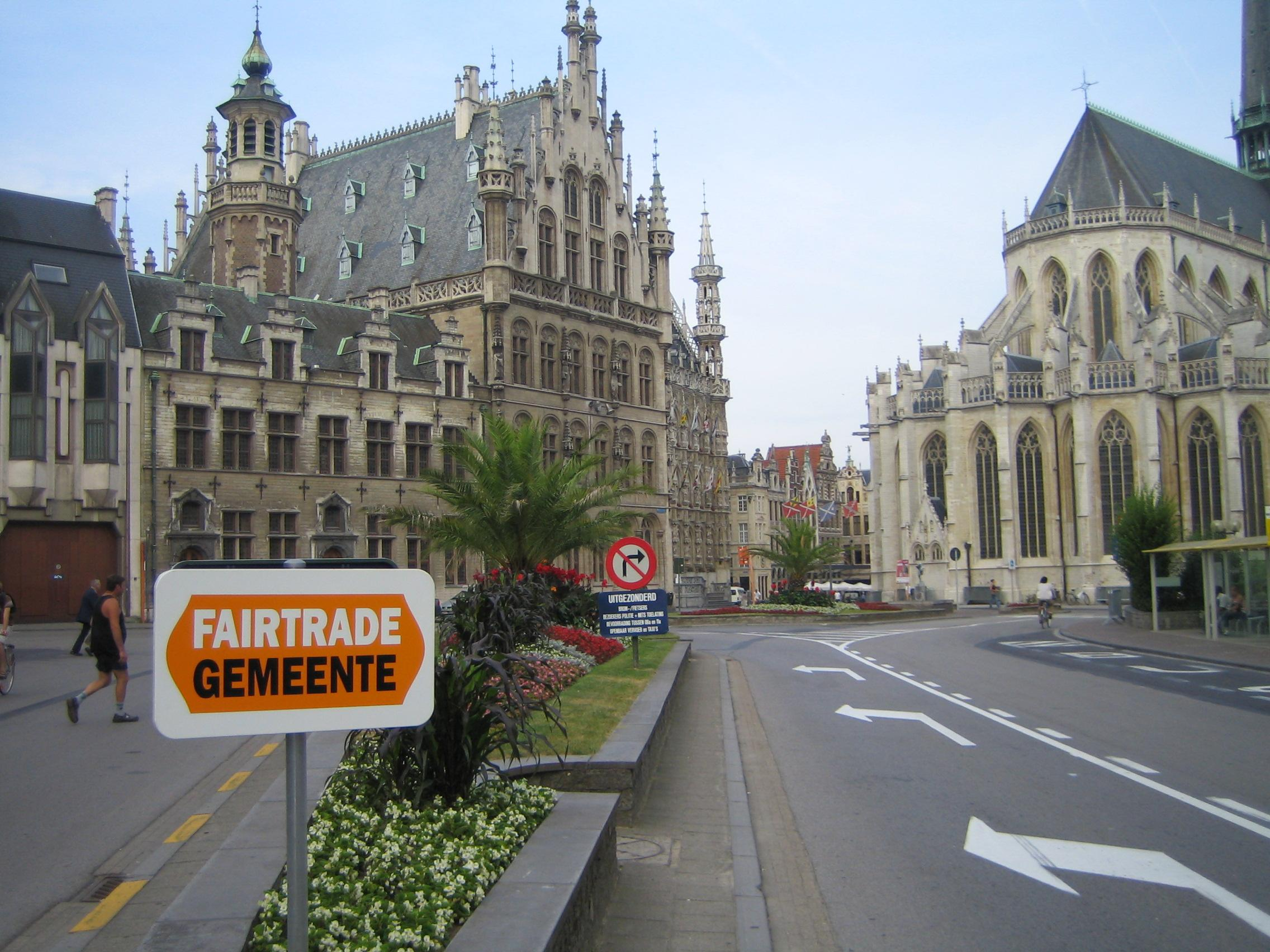
Sign announcing the Belgian city of Leuven's Fair Trade Town status

The Fair Trade Towns campaign is the result of a grass-roots citizens movement that started in the UK in 2001 (see below). It allows citizens to get together in order to self-proclaim their town (or other local geographical area) as a region that complies with a few general Fair Trade criteria, that can be adapted from country to country but which retain their main elements.

In some countries, the Fair Trade Town became a status awarded by a recognized Fair Trade certification body (i.e. the Fairtrade Foundation in the United Kingdom, TransFair Canada in Canada etc.) describing an area which is committed to the promotion of Fair Trade certified goods. By extension, the organizations also award the statuses of Fair Trade City, Fair Trade Village, Fair Trade Zone, Fair Trade Borough, Fair Trade Island, Fair Trade Country, and Fair Trade University.

== History ==
The Fair Trade Town campaign was first launched in 2001 in Garstang, Lancashire, under the initiative of Bruce Crowther, a local Oxfam supporter, and the Garstang Oxfam Group. The initiative, which aimed to promote Fair Trade certified goods in the town, was highly successful: within a couple of months, awareness of the Fairtrade Mark jumped to over 70% in the town while sales of Fairtrade certified goods increased significantly. Moreover, over the course of the campaign, Garstang developed links with Fair Trade cocoa farming communities in West Africa, which led to the twin town relationship with New Koforidua, Ghana.

As the activities at Garstang gained wider attention, the Fairtrade Foundation launched a set of Fair Trade Town Goals and an Action Guide to encourage others to follow in the town's success. During the 2001-2006 period, over 209 British towns were awarded the Fair Trade status by the Fairtrade Foundation. In October 2009 448 British towns and 312 towns worldwide (in total 760) were awarded the Fair Trade status. In November 2012, there were over 1200 worldwide.

In an attempt to replicate the success of the Fairtrade Foundation's Fairtrade Town program, a Europe-wide program called "Fair Trade Towns in Europe", part-funded by the European Commission, was launched jointly by several Fair Trade labelling initiatives.

In November 2006, the first ever European Fair Trade Towns conference was hosted at London Southbank University. The goals of the conference were to

- identify and develop procedures to strengthen the links within and between local communities and private and public organisations;
- develop strategies to enable the UK Fair Trade Towns model to meet the requirements of each individual country.

Following the success of the first event, a second Fair Trade towns conference was subsequently held in Brussels in January 2008. The sixth conference was held in Poznan (Poland) in November 2012, and the 2013 and 2014 international conferences are foreseen to take place in Oslo (Norway) and Kumamoto (Japan), respectively.

There are currently Fair Trade Towns in Australia, Austria, Belgium, Brazil, Canada, Denmark, Finland, France, Ireland, Italy, Norway, New Zealand, Spain, Sweden, the Netherlands, Germany, the United Kingdom and the United States. The list of Fairtrade settlements is a more comprehensive current list.

== Criteria ==
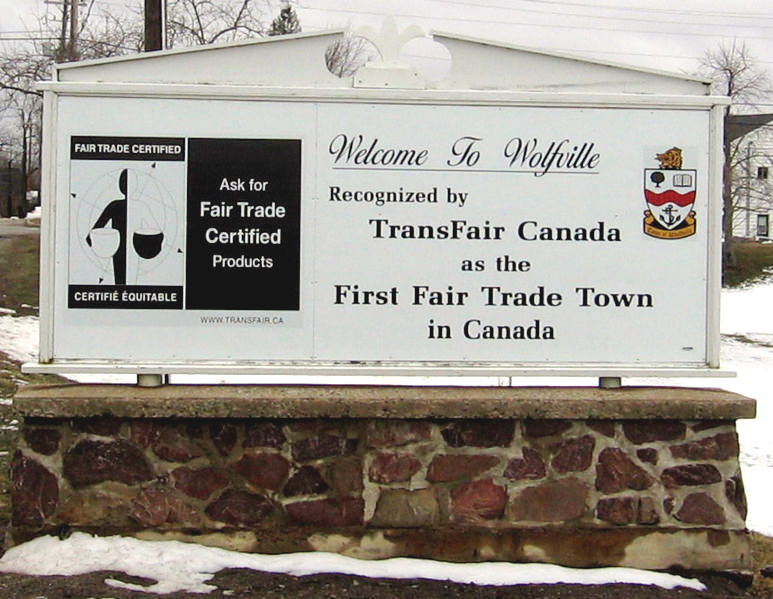
Sign announcing the Fair Trade Town status of Wolfville, Canada

Formal guidelines have been produced jointly by several FLO member Fairtrade labelling initiatives. To be awarded Fair Trade status, an area must meet five criteria (exact numbers and proportions vary from country to country):

- Local council passes a resolution supporting Fair Trade, and agrees to serve Fair Trade tea and coffee at its meetings and in its offices and canteens.
- A range of (at least two) Fair Trade products is readily available in the area's shops and local cafés/catering establishments.
  - Target for number of retail outlets: population of < 10000 - 1 retail outlet per 2500; population < 200000 - 1 retail outlet per 5000; population of < 500000 - 1 retail outlet per 10000.
  - Target for number of catering outlets: population of < 10000 - 1 catering outlet per 5000; population < 200000 - 1 catering outlet per 10000; population of < 500000 - 1 catering outlet per 20000
- Fair Trade products are used by a number of local work places (estate agents, hairdressers, etc.) and community organisations (churches, schools, etc.)
- Attract media coverage and popular support for the campaign.
- A local Fair Trade steering group is convened to ensure continued commitment to its Fair Trade Town status.

== Other initiatives ==
In 2002 The Wales Fair Trade Forum, a network of development NGOs and Fair Trade campaigners, began working to make Wales the world's first Fair Trade country. The idea was based upon the Fair Trade Town scheme run by the Fairtrade Foundation in the UK. In 2005 The Welsh Assembly Government agreed to back the idea and in 2006 Fair Trade groups from Scotland and Wales agreed the criteria for becoming a Fair Trade country.

The draft criteria for a "Fair Trade Nation" are:

- 75% of the population should purchase a Fair Trade product every year.
- 40% of people regularly buy Fair Trade products.
- All local authorities have active Fair Trade groups working towards Fair Trade status.
- 55% local authority areas with Fair Trade status with 10% annual increase in following years

Wales became the world's first Fair Trade nation in June 2008.

== See also ==
- Transition town
- List of Fairtrade settlements
