= Clear red water =

Welsh Labour political strategy

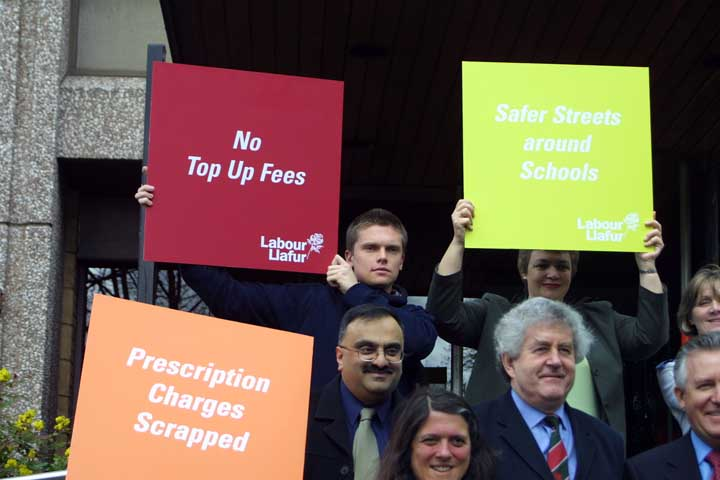
Rhodri Morgan and Welsh Labour supporters campaign against NHS prescription charges and university top-up fees. These have been supported by UK Labour in England but opposed by Welsh Labour in Wales as part of its clear red water strategy.

In Welsh politics, clear red water (Welsh: dŵr coch clir) is the Welsh Labour strategy of distancing itself from the UK Labour Party and adopting both more progressive and more distinctly Welsh policies. The strategy was first formulated in the early 2000s, with the Rhodri Morgan-led Welsh government using it to distinguish itself from Tony Blair's centrist New Labour project. The term itself is credited to Mark Drakeford MS, Morgan's special adviser at the time.

The strategy was further developed under Rhodri Morgan's successors Carwyn Jones and Mark Drakeford before being abandoned by Vaughan Gething in 2024 in favour of a closer relationship with the UK Labour Party under Keir Starmer. Gething's successor Eluned Morgan revived the strategy in 2025, promoting what she called a "red Welsh way" as she distanced Welsh Labour from Starmer's centrist leadership and moved Welsh Labour back to the left.

== Background ==
While Wales was conquered by England in the 13th century and fully annexed in the 16th century, the country has long had a distinct political culture to England. From the Welsh religious nonconformists to the Welsh Chartists, the Welsh political tradition has often been more radical and more centered on the working class than English politics. In the 1800s and early 1900s, Welsh elections were dominated by the Welsh Liberal Party, but by 1950, Welsh Labour had supplanted them as the largest party. Since then, Labour have been the largest party in Wales after almost every single election.

The presence of the Welsh language and Welsh nationalism, as well as the growth of Plaid Cymru in the 1960s, have also contributed to a distinct political culture in the country.

After the 1997 Welsh devolution referendum resulted in a majority in favour of creating a national assembly for Wales, the Government of Wales Act 1998 was passed by Westminster, leading to the National Assembly for Wales in 1999. In 2011, a referendum on expanding the powers of the devolved National Assembly was held, resulting in an even larger majority in favour. In 2020, the National Assembly was renamed the Senedd.

The phrase "clear red water" is probably adapted from the 1990s Conservative party's use of the political slogan "clear blue water" to distinguish themselves from their political opponents.

== Policy ==
The term was coined by special advisor (and later First Minister) Mark Drakeford, as part of a group on the left wing of the party led by First Minister Rhodri Morgan, for a speech Morgan was due to give to the National Centre for Public Policy Swansea in December 2002. Although Morgan initially forgot to use the term, his speech criticised the marketisation of welfare and social services and called for a distinctly Welsh socialism, stating that "that government can and must be a catalyst for change and a force for good in our society. Although to a Welsh audience this might sound simple stuff, it is certainly an idea which would be contested elsewhere."

== Impact ==
The policy has been described by some as a factor in preventing the Pasokification of Welsh Labour, ensuring its continued presence in government in Wales and the lack of collapse seen by Scottish Labour or the issues experienced by UK Labour. That impact has also been described as a factor in the inability of Welsh nationalist party Plaid Cymru to experience substantial growth outside their traditional base, which was not experienced by the Scottish National Party.

After poor showings from UK Labour in the 2015 UK general election and a 7% drop in support for Welsh Labour in the 2016 National Assembly for Wales election, some proponents of the policy called to extend its reach further, calling for full separation of Welsh Labour from the wider UK party.

During the 2015 UK Labour leadership election, Morgan backed Yvette Cooper's bid, stating that Jeremy Corbyn was "old, hard left Labour, so it's got nothing to do with my clear red water speech at all." Corbyn had previously stated that he admired Morgan's policy and had said he hoped to "narrow the red water" so "we can walk across it."

Drakeford was elected to the Senedd in 2011 and would become First Minister in 2018, replacing Carwyn Jones after winning the 2018 Welsh Labour leadership election. At the 2021 Senedd election, Welsh Labour increased their share of the vote by around 5%, leaving them one seat short of a majority despite having been in government continuously for the previous 22 years.

On 22 November 2021, Welsh Labour and Plaid Cymru agreed a co-operation deal to implement "radical change" in the Senedd. In response, Corbyn's former Chancellor, John McDonnell described this as "charting clear red water between Welsh Labour and the Tories."

Ahead of Welsh Labour's annual conference in March 2023, it was reported that the Welsh Labour Grassroots (WLG) group wanted to "bring clear, red water between the party in Wales and the Keir Starmer-led British party ... [by] supporting motions to devolve the party's rulebook, as well as justice and probation to Wales". A WLG spokesperson told the Morning Star: "Devolution of the rulebook is of paramount importance. We must be ready to reflect the Britain we want to see in our party systems. We must bring democracy to the Welsh Labour Party."

In 2025, First Minister Eluned Morgan said she would begin to pursue a leftwing “red Welsh way” and put a clear dividing line between Welsh Labour and the Labour Government in Westminster following a speech where she criticised some of the actions of Keir Starmer's government. Many commentators mentioned the direct parallels to the clear red water strategy following the speech. The attempt to distance the party was perceived as unsuccessful and was credited with Welsh Labour's first ever loss in a Senedd election.

== Criticism ==
In 2012, Plaid Cymru leader Leanne Wood criticised the strategy for not being concrete enough or for offering a sufficiently transformative vision for Wales, stating that it "has turned out to be a sort of diluted Fabianism with a Valleys accent." John Osmond, former director of the Institute of Welsh Affairs, has called the policy one of the few distinct post-devolution policies that has received wide public attention, but that it "has been long on rhetoric, but short on policies that would really make a big difference to Welsh society and really differentiate Welsh policies from those being driven from Whitehall."

Other commentators have criticised the long dominance of the Labour Party in Wales, arguing that the party is complacent in its governance of the country and that it has led to Welsh institutions falling behind their English counterparts. Some commentators have stated that the policy has led to a prioritisation of distinct policies in Welsh governance instead of effective policies.

When running in the 2018 Welsh Labour leadership election, Eluned Morgan call for a rethink of the strategy, stating that the leadership of Jeremy Corbyn had brought UK Labour closer to Welsh Labour. She had previously been a critic of the policy, having made a speech at the 2007 Welsh Labour party conference calling for the party to abandon it and focus instead on appealing to the political centre.

Since the election of Keir Starmer to the UK Labour leadership in 2020, however, some commentators have stated that the divergence between the parties is increasing again.

Plaid Cymru MS Sioned Williams has said: "[W]hen it comes to Westminster and the Union, Labour in Wales faces both ways. The 'clear red waters' of Rhodri Morgan's politics – a strategy to distance 'Welsh Labour' from Tony Blair's 'New Labour' – was more rhetoric than reality and, in any case, are long gone. A red herring."

== Other uses of the term ==
In October 2014, Member of the Scottish Parliament (MSP) Neil Findlay announced his bid for leadership of Scottish Labour by telling the Campaign for Socialism, "I'm best placed to provide an alternative to the Scottish National Party and put clear red water between us and them."

In August 2017, then-Labour MP Chuka Umunna claimed that UK Labour needed to distinguish themselves from Conservative Party policies on Brexit, notably in supporting continued membership of the single market and the customs union.

Upon Starmer's election as UK Labour leader, former Labour MP Tom Harris used "clear red water" to argue that Starmer needed to separate his leadership from that of Corbyn.
