= Kostadin Kostadinov (disambiguation) =

Kostadin Kostadinov (born 1979) is a Bulgarian politician.

Kostadin Kostadinov may also refer to:

- Kostadin Kostadinov (roboticist) (born 1955), Bulgarian roboticist
- Kostadin Kostadinov (footballer) (born 1959), Bulgarian footballer and manager
