= List of Fairtrade settlements =

Fairtrade Town is a status awarded by a recognized Fairtrade certification body (i.e. The Fairtrade Foundation in the UK, TransFair Canada in Canada etc.) describing an area which is committed to the promotion of Fairtrade certified goods. By extension, the organizations also award the statuses of Fairtrade Nation, Fairtrade City, Fairtrade Village, Fairtrade Zone, Fairtrade Borough, Fairtrade Island, Fairtrade County and Fairtrade University.

== Australia ==
=== Communities ===
- Yarra

== Austria ==
=== Towns ===
As of 9 July 2008

- Altaussee
- Bad Aussee
- Bad Mitterndorf
- Baden bei Wien
- Breitenfurt bei Wien
- Feldbach
- Fürstenfeld
- Gablitz
- Gleisdorf
- Grundlsee
- Hartkirchen
- Lichtenegg
- Lieboch
- Liezen
- Losenstein
- Mönichkirchen
- Mürzzuschlag
- Ottendorf an der Rittschein
- Payerbach
- Pichl-Kainisch
- Poysdorf
- Rainbach im Mühlkreis
- Retz
- Sankt Valentin
- Scheibbs
- Tauplitz
- Ulrichskirchen-Schleinbach
- Waidhofen an der Ybbs
- Warth, Lower Austria
- Weiz
- Wiener Neustadt
- Molln
- St. Leonhard am Forst
- Steinbach an der Steyr

=== Boroughs ===
As of 9 July 2008

- Josefstadt
- Wieden

== Belgium ==
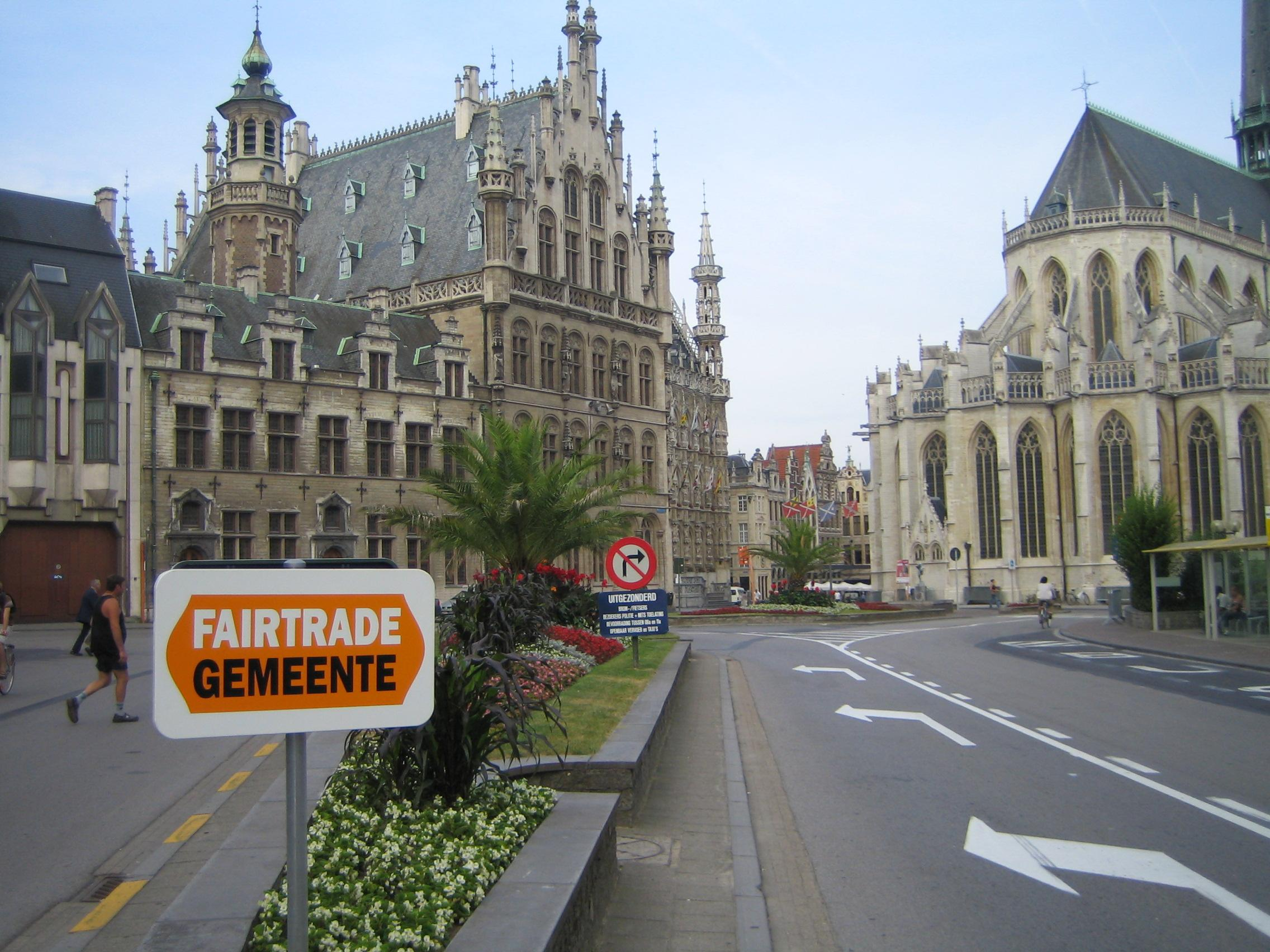
Sign announcing the Belgian city of Leuven's Fairtrade Town status

=== Towns ===
As of 14 December 2006

- Aalst
- Alken
- Antwerp
- Anzegem
- Arendonk
- As
- Asse
- Assenede
- Balen
- Beernem
- Beerse
- Beringen
- Beveren
- Bierbeek
- Bilzen
- Bocholt
- Bornem
- Boutersem
- Brecht
- Bruges
- Brussels
- Damme
- De Pinte
- Deerlijk
- Diest
- Dilbeek
- Duffel
- Edegem
- Eeklo
- Elsene
- Essen
- Evergem
- Geel
- Genk
- Ghent
- Gooik
- Grimbergen
- Haacht
- Halle
- Ham
- Hamont-Achel
- Harelbeke
- Hasselt
- Herent
- Herentals
- Herk-de-Stad
- Herne
- Heusden-Zolder
- Hoegaarden
- Hoeilaart
- Holsbeek
- Hooglede
- Hoogstraten
- Houthalen-Helchteren
- Izegem
- Kalmthout
- Kasterlee
- Knokke-Heist
- Koksijde
- Kontich
- Kortrijk
- Kuurne
- Laakdal
- Leuven
- Lichtervelde
- Lier
- Lokeren
- Lommel
- Lummen
- Maldegem
- Malle
- Mechelen
- Merelbeke
- Middelkerke
- Mol
- Mortsel
- Nieuwpoort
- Nijlen
- Oosterzele
- Oostkamp
- Ostend
- Oud-Heverlee
- Oud-Turnhout
- Overpelt
- Poperinge
- Puurs
- Riemst
- Rijkevorsel
- Roeselare
- Rotselaar
- Rumst
- Schelle
- Scherpenheuvel-Zichem
- Schoten
- Sint-Gillis-Waas
- Sint-Niklaas
- Sint-Truiden
- Stabroek
- Tervuren
- Tessenderlo
- Tielt
- Tongeren
- Turnhout
- Vilvoorde
- Voeren
- Vorselaar
- Vosselaar
- Waregem
- Westerlo
- Wetteren
- Wijnegem
- Wuustwezel
- Ypres
- Zoersel
- Zottegem
- Zwijndrecht

=== Towns ===
- Brussels
- Fernelmont
- Florennes
- Ixelles
- Mons

== Brazil ==
=== Towns ===
- Alfenas

== Canada ==
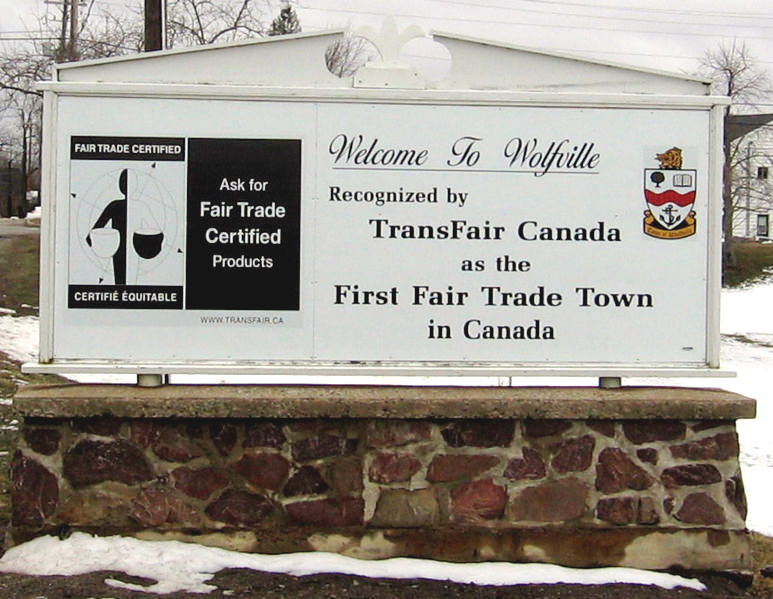
Sign announcing Wolfville's (Canada) Fair Trade Town status

=== Towns ===
As of 26 September 2013

- Barrie
- Canmore
- Edmonton
- Gimli
- Golden
- La Pêche
- Mercier-Hochelaga-Maisonneuve
- Nakusp
- Neuville
- Olds
- Port Colborne
- Revelstoke
- Sainte Anne de Bellevue
- Sherbrooke
- Toronto
- Vancouver
- Wolfville

== Czech Republic ==
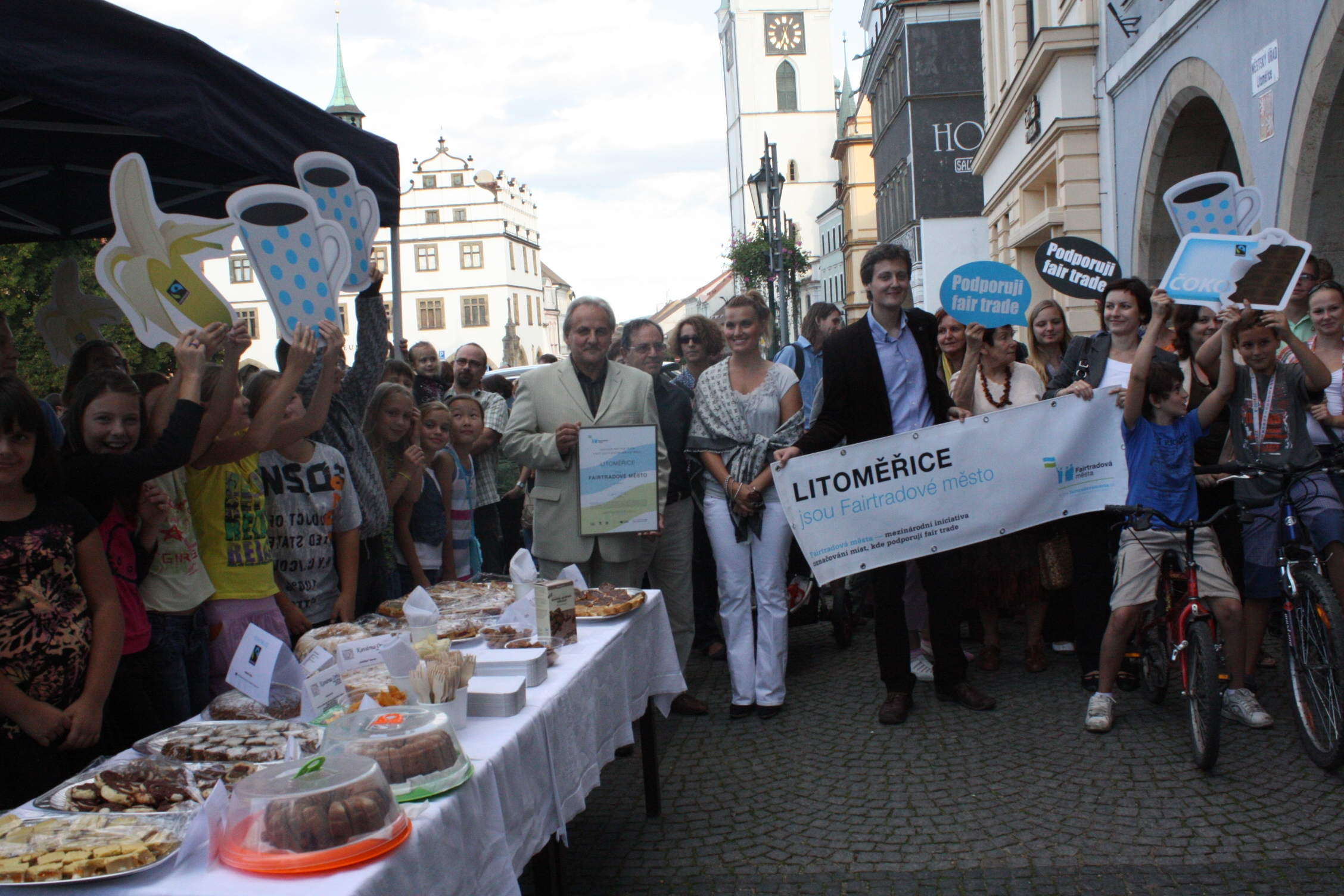
Awarding Fairtrade Town status to Litoměřice

=== Cities ===
As of 9 May 2016

- Český Krumlov
- Chrudim
- Hodonín
- Kroměříž
- Litoměřice
- Mladá Boleslav
- Třebíč
- Volyně
- Vsetín

== Denmark ==
=== Cities ===
- Copenhagen

== Finland ==
=== Cities ===
As of August 2013

- Espoo
- Joensuu
- Lohja
- Pori
- Riihimäki
- Tampere

=== Municipalities ===
- Kirkkonummi
- Utajärvi

== France ==
=== Territories ===
- Conseil Régional d'Ile-de-France
- Conseil Régional Nord-Pas-de-Calais
- Conseil Régional des Pays de la Loire
- Conseil Régional Rhône-Alpes
- Ville d'Alfortville (Val de Marne)
- Ville de Boulogne-Billancourt (Hauts-de-Seine)
- Ville de Bourg-en-Bresse (Ain)
- Ville de Chevilly-Larue (Val-de-Marne)
- Ville de Cluses (Haute-Savoie)
- Ville de Dijon (Côtes d'Or)
- Ville de Drancy (Seine-St-Denis)
- Ville de Grenoble (Isère)
- Ville de Longjumeau (Essonne)
- Ville de Lyon (Rhône)
- Ville de Mouans-Sartoux (Alpes-Maritimes)
- Ville de Nantes (Loire-Atlantique)
- Ville d'Orléans (Loiret)
- Ville de Paris (Paris)
- Ville de Rodez (Aveyron)
- Ville de Saales (Bas-Rhin)
- Ville de Saint-Paul (Ile de la Réunion)
- Ville de Tours (Indre et Loire)
- Ville d'Ungersheim (Haut-Rhin)

== Germany ==
=== Towns ===
- Abensberg
- Augsburg
- Bad Honnef
- Castrop-Rauxel
- Dinslaken
- Dortmund
- Hannover
- Heidelberg
- Herrsching am Ammersee
- Jena
- Karlsruhe
- Ludwigsburg
- Marburg
- Neumarkt in der Oberpfalz
- Neuss
- Nordhausen
- Nürnberg
- Rheda-Wiedenbrück
- Rhein-Kreis Neuss
- Rottenburg am Neckar
- Rumbach
- Saarbrücken
- Sonthofen
- Trier
- Viernheim
- Wesel
- Wolfsburg
- Wuppertal

== Ireland ==
=== Towns ===
As of 25 February 2008

- Athlone
- Ballymun
- Baltinglass
- Bandon
- Bantry
- Bray
- Carlow
- Castlebar
- Clonakilty
- Cork City
- Dublin City
- Ennis
- Galway
- Greystones
- Kilkenny
- Kinsale
- Limerick
- Maynooth
- Mullingar
- Newbridge
- Portlaoise
- Roscommon
- Skibbereen
- Sligo
- Thurles
- Tubbercurry
- Waterford
- Westport
- Wexford

== Italy ==
=== Communes ===
As of 25 February 2008

- Anzola dell'Emilia
- Appignano del Tronto
- Concorezzo
- Finale Ligure
- Florence
- Foligno
- Follonica
- Genazzano
- Mezzago
- Modena
- Padua
- Pozzallo
- Rome
- Sala Bolognese
- Settimo Torinese
- Valdagno

=== Provinces ===
As of 25 February 2008

- Cremona
- Ferrara
- Liguria
- Milan

== Netherlands ==
=== Towns ===
As of 9 March 2009

- Goes
- Groningen

As of 16 May 2009

- Het Bildt

== Norway ==
=== Municipalities ===
- Asker
- Bergen
- Flora
- Fredrikstad
- Kvinesdal
- Lier
- Sauda
- Stavanger
- Volda
- Ørsta

== Spain ==
=== Cities ===
- Bilbao
- Córdoba
- Espejo
- Getxo
- Laredo
- Legazpi
- Madrid
- Málaga
- Orihuela
- Puerto Real
- Torrelavega

== Sweden ==
=== Cities ===
As of September 2013

- Alingsås Municipality
- Askersund Municipality
- Avesta Municipality
- Borlänge Municipality
- Borås Municipality
- Botkyrka Municipality
- Boxholm Municipality
- Eda Municipality
- Emmaboda Municipality
- Eskilstuna Municipality
- Fagersta Municipality
- Forshaga Municipality
- Gnosjö Municipality
- Gotland Municipality
- Göteborg Municipality
- Hallsberg Municipality
- Hammarö Municipality
- Haparanda Municipality
- Helsingborg Municipality
- Härnösand Municipality
- Härryda Municipality
- Jönköping Municipality
- Kalmar Municipality
- Karlstad Municipality
- Kil Municipality
- Kristinehamn Municipality
- Kumla Municipality
- Landskrona Municipality
- Lerum Municipality
- Linköping Municipality
- Ljungby Municipality
- Lomma Municipality
- Ludvika Municipality
- Luleå Municipality
- Lund Municipality
- Malmö Municipality
- Mark Municipality
- Munkfors Municipality
- Norrköping Municipality
- Nässjö Municipality
- Piteå Municipality
- Ronneby Municipality
- Sigtuna Municipality
- Strömstad Municipality
- Sundbyberg Municipality
- Säffle Municipality
- Söderköping Municipality
- Södertälje Municipality
- Tranås Municipality
- Trollhättan Municipality
- Töreboda Municipality
- Uddevalla Municipality
- Umeå Municipality
- Vänersborg Municipality
- Västerås Municipality
- Växjö Municipality
- Ängelholm Municipality
- Öckerö Municipality
- Örebro Municipality
- Östersund Municipality

== United Kingdom ==
=== Nations ===
As of 6 June 2008

- Scotland
- Wales

=== Cities ===
As of 14 December 2006

- Aberdeen
- Belfast
- Birmingham
- Brighton & Hove
- Bristol
- Cambridge
- Cardiff
- Carlisle
- Chelmsford
- Chester
- Chichester
- Conwy
- Coventry
- Derby
- Dundee
- Edinburgh
- Exeter
- Flintshire
- Glasgow
- Hereford
- Inverness
- Hull
- Lancaster
- Leeds
- Leicester
- Liverpool
- London (City of London)
- Manchester
- Newcastle upon Tyne
- Norwich
- Nottingham
- Oxford
- Perth
- Plymouth
- Portsmouth
- Preston
- Salford
- Sheffield
- Southampton
- St Albans
- Stirling
- Stoke-on-Trent
- Swansea
- Wells
- Wolverhampton
- Worcester
- York

=== Towns ===
As of 14 December 2006

- Aberfeldy
- Abergele
- Aberystwyth
- Alsager
- Altrincham
- Ammanford
- Andover
- Arundel
- Ashbourne
- Axbridge
- Baildon
- Bewdley
- Barrow-In-Furness
- Bideford
- Bingley
- Bolton
- Bradford on Avon
- Brampton
- Brecon
- Bridgnorth
- Burgess Hill
- Burntisland
- Calne
- Cam & Dursley
- Castle Cary
- Chesham
- Church Stretton
- Colchester
- Cowbridge
- Devizes
- Doncaster
- Dorchester
- Dorking
- Dornoch
- Dunoon
- East Grinstead
- East Kilbride
- Edenbridge
- Ellon
- Falkirk
- Falmouth
- Faringdon
- Faversham
- Frome
- Garstang
- Grange-over-Sands
- Glastonbury
- Guildford
- Guisborough
- Hamilton
- Hartlepool
- Hitchin
- Holme Valley
- Horsham
- Hornsea
- Horwich
- Ilkley
- Ipswich
- Kendal
- Kenilworth
- Keswick
- Keynsham
- Knighton
- Lampeter
- Largs
- Ledbury
- Leighton–Linslade
- Leominster
- Lewes
- Linlithgow
- Livingston
- Llanidloes
- Lochgelly
- Lowestoft
- Ludlow
- Malvern
- Matlock & District
- Millom
- Minehead
- Mirfield
- Monmouth
- Morpeth
- Motherwell
- Nailsworth
- Newbury
- New Mills
- Northallerton
- Northampton
- Oban & District
- Oswestry
- Paisley
- Penarth
- Reading
- Penarth
- Penistone
- Porthcawl
- Reading
- Romsey
- Rotherham
- Royal Leamington Spa
- Sandbach
- Sevenoaks
- Shipley, West Yorkshire
- Sleaford, Lincolnshire
- Southwell
- St Andrews
- St Neots
- Stafford
- Stamford
- Stourport-on-Severn
- Strathaven
- Stroud
- Swanage
- Taunton
- Tavistock
- Teignmouth
- Thornbury, South Gloucestershire
- Uckfield
- Ware
- Wareham
- Wiveliscombe
- Windermere & Bowness
- Worthing
- Wotton-under-Edge

=== Villages ===
As of 14 December 2006

- Bradford-on-Avon
- Cherry Burton
- Criccieth
- Fairlie
- Haworth
- Kilmacolm and Quarriers
- Wheatley, Oxfordshire
- Winscombe

=== Counties ===
As of 14 December 2006

- Cardiff
- Conwy
- Cumbria
- Denbighshire
- Devon
- East Riding of Yorkshire
- Flintshire
- Herefordshire
- Kinross-shire
- Somerset
- Swansea

=== Boroughs ===
As of 14 December 2006

- Charnwood
- Gosport
- Harrogate
- London Borough of Camden
- London Borough of Croydon
- Royal Borough of Greenwich
- London Borough of Hammersmith and Fulham
- London Borough of Islington
- Royal Borough of Kingston upon Thames
- London Borough of Lambeth
- London Borough of Lewisham
- London Borough of Richmond upon Thames
- Milton Keynes
- Pendle
- Rochdale
- Stockport
- Swindon
- Vale Royal
- Warrington
- Wirral
- Woking

=== Islands ===
As of 14 December 2006

- Fair Isle
- Guernsey
- Jersey
- Papa Westray
- Shetland Islands
- Westray

=== Zones ===
As of 17 February 2007

- Bath and North East Somerset
- Bradford
- Chorlton-cum-Hardy
- Dyfi Valley
- Eden Valley
- Hebden Bridge
- Lakes Parish
- Lingfield & Dormansland
- Mid-Formartine in Aberdeenshire
- Peebles & Tweeddale
- Weymouth and Portland
- Wrexham
- Yatton & Claverham

=== Universities ===
- Aberystwyth University
- Anglia Ruskin University
- Aston University
- Bangor University
- Bishop Grosseteste University
- University of Birmingham
- Blackpool and Fylde College
- Bournemouth University
- Brunel University
- Buckinghamshire New University
- Canterbury Christ Church University
- Cardiff University
- Carmel College
- City College Plymouth
- Deeside College (FE)
- Durham University
- Edinburgh Napier University
- Farnborough Sixth Form College
- Fitzwilliam College, Cambridge
- Harper Adams University
- Heriot-Watt University
- Hertford College, Oxford
- Jesus College, Cambridge
- Keele University
- King's College London
- King's College, Cambridge
- Kingston University London
- Lancaster and Morecambe College (HE & FE)
- Lancaster University
- Leeds Metropolitan
- Leeds Trinity University
- Linacre College, Oxford
- Liverpool Hope University
- Liverpool John Moores University
- London School of Economics and Political Science
- London South Bank University
- Loughborough University
- Manchester Metropolitan University
- Myerscough College
- NEWI (North Wales Institute of Further Education)
- Newman University, Birmingham
- Northumbria University
- Nottingham Trent University
- Oxford Brookes
- Pembroke College, Cambridge
- Pendelton College (FE & HE)
- Queen's University, Belfast
- Roehampton University
- Royal Holloway College, London
- Sheffield College (FE & HE)
- Sheffield Hallam University
- South East Essex College (HE & FE)
- Southampton Solent University
- St Brendan's Sixth Form College
- St Catharine's College (Cambridge Uni)
- St John's University, York
- St. Mary's University College (Belfast)
- Sunderland (City of S. College) (FE & HE)
- Swansea Metropolitan University
- Trinity College Carmarthen University
- University College London
- University of Aberdeen
- University of Abertay Dundee
- University of Bath
- University of Birmingham
- University of Bradford
- University of Brighton
- University of Bristol
- University of Cardiff
- University of Central Lancashire
- University of Chester
- University of Chichester
- University of Derby
- University of Dundee
- University of East Anglia
- University of Edinburgh
- University of Essex
- University of Exeter
- University of Glamorgan
- University of Glasgow
- University of Gloucestershire
- University of Hertfordshire
- University of Huddersfield
- University of Hull
- University of Kent
- University of Leeds
- University of Leicester
- University of Liverpool
- University of Manchester
- University of Newcastle upon Tyne
- University of Nottingham
- University of Plymouth
- University of Portsmouth
- University of Reading
- University of Sheffield
- University of Southampton
- University of St Andrews
- University of Staffordshire
- University of Sunderland
- University of Surrey
- University of Sussex
- University of Teesside
- University of Wales, Newport
- University of Wales Institute, Cardiff
- University of Wales Swansea
- University of Warwick
- University of Winchester
- University of Wolverhampton
- University of York
- UWE, Bristol
- Wadham College, Oxford
- Westminster Kingsway College (FE & HE)
- Worcester College of Technology (FE&HE)

== United States ==
=== Towns ===
As of April 2015

- Alexandria, VA
- Amherst, MA
- Ballston Spa, NY
- Berkeley, CA
- Bloomington, IN
- Bluffton, OH
- Boston, MA
- Brattleboro, VT
- Buena Vista, CO
- Burlington, VT
- Chapel Hill, NC
- Chelsea, MI
- Chicago, IL
- Chico, CA
- Claremont, CA
- Cleveland Heights, OH
- Conway, MA
- Dayton, OH
- Fond du Lac, WI
- Greenwich, CT
- Healdsburg, CA
- Highland Park, NJ
- La Mesa, CA
- Lawrence, KS
- Madison, WI
- Mankato, MN
- Media, PA
- Milwaukee, WI
- Montclair, NJ
- Norman, OK
- Northampton MA
- Olympia, WA
- Overland Park, KS
- Pasadena, CA
- Princeton, NJ
- Red Bank, NJ
- San Francisco, CA
- San Ramon, CA
- State College, PA
- Taos, NM
- Teaneck, NJ
- Winter Park, FL

=== Universities and colleges ===
As of August 2015

- Assumption College
- Berea College (KY)
- Cabrini College (PA)
- Champlain College (VT)
- Colby Sawyer College (NH)
- Creighton University (NE)
- DePaul University (IL)
- Hartwick College (NY)
- John Carroll University (OH)
- Loras College (IA)
- Loyola Marymount University (CA)
- Manhattan University
- Moraine Park Technical College (WI)
- Neuman University (PA)
- Penn State, Brandywine
- Pomona College (CA)
- Rollins College (FL)
- Saint Joseph's University (PA)
- Saint Mary’s College of California
- Saint Michael's College (VT)
- Seattle University (WA)
- Siena College (NY)
- St. Mary's University (TX)
- Tulane University (LA)
- University of California, San Diego
- University of San Diego
- University of Wisconsin, Oshkosh
- Villanova University (PA)
- Western Kentucky University

=== Schools ===
As of August 2015

- Cardinal Newman High School (CA)
- Chaminade Julienne (OH)
- The Community School (ID)
- Emma Willard School (NY)
- Loyola Catholic School (MN)
- Magnificat High School (PA)
- Media Elementary School (PA)
- Media Providence Friends School (PA)
- Mercy Vocational High School (PA)
- Penncrest High School (PA)
- Phillips Exeter High School (NH)
- St. Mary's College High School (CA)
- Teaneck High School (NJ)
- The Walden School (PA)

=== Congregations ===
As of August 2015

- 2nd Congressional/1st Presbyterian Church (Rockford, IL)
- Congregation Beth Shalom (Teaneck, NJ)
- First Church of the Nazarene (San Diego, CA)
- First Congregational U.C.C. (Mankato, MN)
- Holy Family Church (South Pasadena, CA)
- Our Lady of Assumption (Claremont, CA)
- St. John's Episcopal Church (Mankato, MN)
- St. Martin of Tours Catholic Church (La Mesa, CA)
- St. Paul's Lutheran Church (Teaneck, NJ)
- St. Timothy Catholic Church (West Los Angeles, CA)
- The Unity Center (San Diego, CA)
