= North of England Refugee Service =

UK nonprofit organization

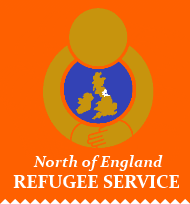
- Founded: 1989
- Type: Non-profit; NGO
- Location: Head Office in Newcastle upon Tyne,
- Key people: Mohamed Nasreldin (Director); Daoud (David) Zaaroura (CEO Retired 2014)
- Website: www.refugee.org.uk

The North of England Refugee Service (NERS) is an independent and charitable organisation which exists to meet the needs and represent the interests of asylum seekers and refugees who have arrived or have settled in the North East of England.

NERS acts as an agent of positive change in order to improve the conditions of life for asylum seekers and refugees and promote social inclusion by facilitating their integration and equal participation within British society.

== History ==
The North of England Refugee Service was established in 1989. It is an independent charitable organisation, and exists to meet the needs and promote the interests of asylum seekers and refugees who have arrived or have settled in the North of England.

NERS acts as an agent of positive change in order to improve the everyday life conditions of asylum seekers and refugees, and to promote social inclusion by facilitating their integration and equal participation within British society.

Since April 2000 NERS has been operating the One Stop Service contract in the North east. This service is available to all asylum seekers who are entitled to support from the Home Office "National Asylum Support Service" (NASS) which was established under the Immigration and Asylum Act 1999.

As well as working directly with asylum seekers, NERS is also involved in a host of other refugee related work. Their website features the work in detail and reports opinions on issues related to their work.

The North of England Refugee Service works in partnership with many other refugee organisations, including the British Red Cross, Refugee Council, Scottish Refugee Council, Welsh Refugee Council, Northern Refugee Centre, and Refugee Action.

== Work ==
The North of England Refugee Service's head office at Newcastle upon Tyne, along with other offices in Sunderland and Middlesbrough. The charity's main activities are providing support and advice to asylum seekers and refugees themselves as well as to other organisations, undertaking research and policy work, and campaigning on behalf of refugees and asylum seekers. The Refugee Service is a member organisation of the Asylum Support Partnership.

=== Support and advice ===
North of England Refugee Service has received exemption from the OISC to provide immigration advice. The Regional offices provide services to asylum seekers and refugees including:

- Advice about where to apply for support, and help with applying;
- Information about the UK's 'dispersal policy';
- Information about other services which can assist;
- Help with problems with accommodation, racial harassment, physical and mental health; and
- Help with appealing against rejection of a UKBA support application.

These services are available either in the North of England Refugee Service offices or on the phone.

=== Campaigning ===
The North of England Refugee Service has been campaigning on Asylum issues and supports the Refugee Council campaign Proud to Protect pledge which with the help of celebrity supporters gathered over 10,000 signatures.

== See also ==
- United Nations High Commissioner for Refugees
- European Council on Refugees and Exiles
- Refugee Week
