= City of Sanctuary (UK) =

UK charity

- Founded: 2005
- Founders: Craig Barnett and Inderjit Bhogal
- Type: Non-profit
- Key people: Sian Summers-Rees (CEO), Sabir Zazai (Hon. President)
- Website: cityofsanctuary.org

City of Sanctuary is a British charitable organisation whose purpose is to build a movement of welcome across the UK, predominantly for asylum seekers and refugees, by coordinating and supporting networks of community groups across the UK and Ireland. It claims to be a grassroots movement.

City of Sanctuary began in 2005 in Sheffield, South Yorkshire, founded by Craig Barnett and Inderjit Bhogal. In 2007, Sheffield became the UK’s first ‘City of Sanctuary’ – "a city that takes pride in the welcome it offers to people in need of safety." Subsequently, cities such as Leeds, Hull, York, and Swansea started their own community groups to work towards the same purpose, and City of Sanctuary became a registered charity with the purpose of supporting and connecting these groups.

== Activity ==
City of Sanctuary is involved in coordinating and supporting various multi-sector community groups, with connections to other related organisations in the UK such as the Refugee Council, British Red Cross, and Refugee Action. They also participated in the Sanctuary Summit in 2014, and were selected in 2015 for the Guardian Christmas Appeal, amid the response to the 2015 European migrant crisis.

From 2014 to 2018, City of Sanctuary hosted an event in parliament alongside the All-Party Parliamentary Group on Refugees, which invited refugees and asylum seekers from across the UK to meet and share stories with MPs. City of Sanctuary additionally designates "Streams of Sanctuary", based around a particular theme, which are implemented across various sectors including education, local authorities, faith groups and the arts.

== Sanctuary Awards ==
City of Sanctuary offers awards to community groups, private organisations, public sector services or other bodies that contribute towards the vision of the charity, as follows:

- In 2015 the first "Sports Club of Sanctuary" was awarded to Brighton Table Tennis Club.
- In 2016 the first "Theatre Company of Sanctuary" was awarded to Stand & Be Counted (SBC).
- In 2017 the first "Festival of Sanctuary" was awarded to Journeys Festival.
- In 2021 the first "Local Authority of Sanctuary" was awarded to Lewisham London Borough Council.
- In 2021 the first "Art Gallery of Sanctuary" was awarded to the Glynn Vivian Art Gallery in Swansea.
- In 2022 the first "Station of Sanctuary" was awarded to Bradford Interchange.
- In 2026 the first "Mosque of Sanctuary" was awarded to Green Lane Mosque.
