= Pratap Chitnis, Baron Chitnis =

The Right Honourable The Lord Chitnis

Member of the House of Lords
- Lord Temporal
- Life peerage 18 July 1977 – 12 July 2013

Personal details
- Born: 1 May 1936
- Died: 12 July 2013 (aged 77)

Pratap Chidamber Chitnis, Baron Chitnis (1 May 1936 – 12 July 2013) was a British Liberal political organiser.

The son of Chidamber N. Chitnis and Lucia Mallik, he was born in London and educated at Stonyhurst College. He was further educated at the University of Birmingham, where he graduated with a Bachelor of Arts, and at the University of Kansas, where he received a Master of Arts.

An administration assistant of the National Coal Board from 1958 to 1959, Chitnis acted as agent for Eric Lubbock in the successful Liberal campaign in the 1962 Orpington by-election. Afterwards he rose to become head of the Liberal Party Organisation in 1966, embarking on a structural modernisation, but resigned in 1969 having had a strained relationship with party leader Jeremy Thorpe.

Chitnis next worked for the Joseph Rowntree Social Service Trust, as secretary from 1969 to 1975, and chief executive and director from 1975 to 1988. He was a member of the Community Relations Commission from 1970 to 1977 and of the BBC Asian Programme Advice Committee between 1972 and 1977; he also chaired the latter between 1979 and 1983. From 1981 to 1986, he was chairman of Refugee Action and from 1986 to 1989 of the British Refugee Council.

Chitnis served as an advisor to David Steel during the latter's leadership of the Liberal Party, and was influential during the Lib-Lab pact and the negotiations that led to the SDP–Liberal Alliance. On 18 July 1977, he was made a life peer as Baron Chitnis, of Ryedale in the County of North Yorkshire. He sat on the crossbenches in the House of Lords.

Chitnis married Anne Brand, daughter of Frank Mansell Brand, in 1964. They had one son, Simon, who died in childhood. He retired to France. Lord Chitnis died on 12 July 2013.
