= Donna Covey =

British charity executive

Donna May Covey CBE (born 20 June 1961) is a British charity executive and former trade union leader.

Covey attended the University of Warwick, where she completed a degree in mathematics and business studies, then the Birkbeck Institute. On graduating, she began working in research for the Engineers and Managers Association, then soon moved to work in the same role at the GMB union. She was also chair of the London Food Commission in 1986/87 and vice-chair of the Wandsworth Community Health Council in 1987/88. then soon moved to work for the GMB Union. In 1988, she became a national officer for the GMB, and the following year was elected to the General Council of the Trades Union Congress. From 1992 to 1998, she also served on the National Women's Committee of the Labour Party.

In 1998, Covey moved to become director of the Association of Community Health Councils for England and Wales. At the time, the government planned to abolish community health councils, but the threat was withdrawn until several years later. In 2001, she became Chief Executive of the National Asthma Campaign, then from 2007 held the same post on the Refugee Council. From 2010 to 2012, she also served as a trustee of the Equality and Diversity Forum. During her time with the Refugee Council, its income halved, and Covey left in 2012.

In 2014, Covey became the director of Against Violence and Abuse. That year, she was made a Commander of the Order of the British Empire.

Non-profit organization positions
Preceded by Maeve Sherlock	Chief Executive of the Refugee Council; 2007–2012	Succeeded by Maurice Wren
