= Le Moignan =

Le Moignan is a surname derived from a placename in Seine-Maritime. Notable people with the surname include:

- Christina Le Moignan (born 1942), British Methodist minister and academic
- Martine Le Moignan (born 1962), squash player from Guernsey who represented England
- Michel Le Moignan (1919–2000), Canadian Catholic priest and politician
