= Refugee Week =

June observance

Refugee Week takes place every year around World Refugee Day (20 June). More than 20 countries around the world observe a Refugee Week.

== Aims ==
By providing a platform for people who have sought sanctuary to share their experiences, perspectives and creative work on their own terms, the festival aims to enable refugees and asylum seekers to be able to live safely within inclusive and resilient communities, where they can continue to make a valuable contribution.

== Past Refugee Weeks ==
In Refugee Week 2024, there were more than 15,000 events and activities, with more than 1.3 million people taking part.

In 2026, Refugee Week took place from 15 June to 21 June, with the theme "Courage". Events take place across the UK and internationally.

The themes and dates of other Refugee Weeks have included:

- "Imagine" (15-21 June 2020)
- "We cannot walk alone" (14–20 June 2021)
- "Healing" (20–26 June 2022)
- "Compassion" (19–25 June 2023)
- "Our Home" (17–23 June 2024)
- "Community as a Superpower" (16–22 June 2025)

== By country ==
Australia

The 2026 Refugee Week in Australia is the country's 40th annual observance. The Australian theme in 2026 is "A Million Stories", reflecting the fact that Australia has issued one million permanent humanitarian visas since 1947.

United Kingdom

Refugee Week UK is a partnership project coordinated by Counterpoints Arts, working with Amnesty International, Barnardo's, Ben & Jerry's, British Future, the British Red Cross, Choose Love, City of Sanctuary, Freedom from Torture, imix, IOM (the International Organization for Migration), the International Rescue Committee, Migrant Help, National Education Union, Oxfam, Refugee Council, Refugee Action, Scottish Refugee Council, Student Action for Refugees, UK for UNHCR, UNHCR (United Nations High Commissioner for Refugees), and the Welsh Refugee Council.

UK Refugee Week activities are delivered with multiple national and regional partners.

Elsewhere

Refugee Week is also celebrated in Berlin, Croatia, Greece, Hong Kong, Ireland, Jordan, Malta, Lithuania, Slovenia and Taiwan.
