= Migrant crisis =

Situation resulting from flows of immigrants to a country

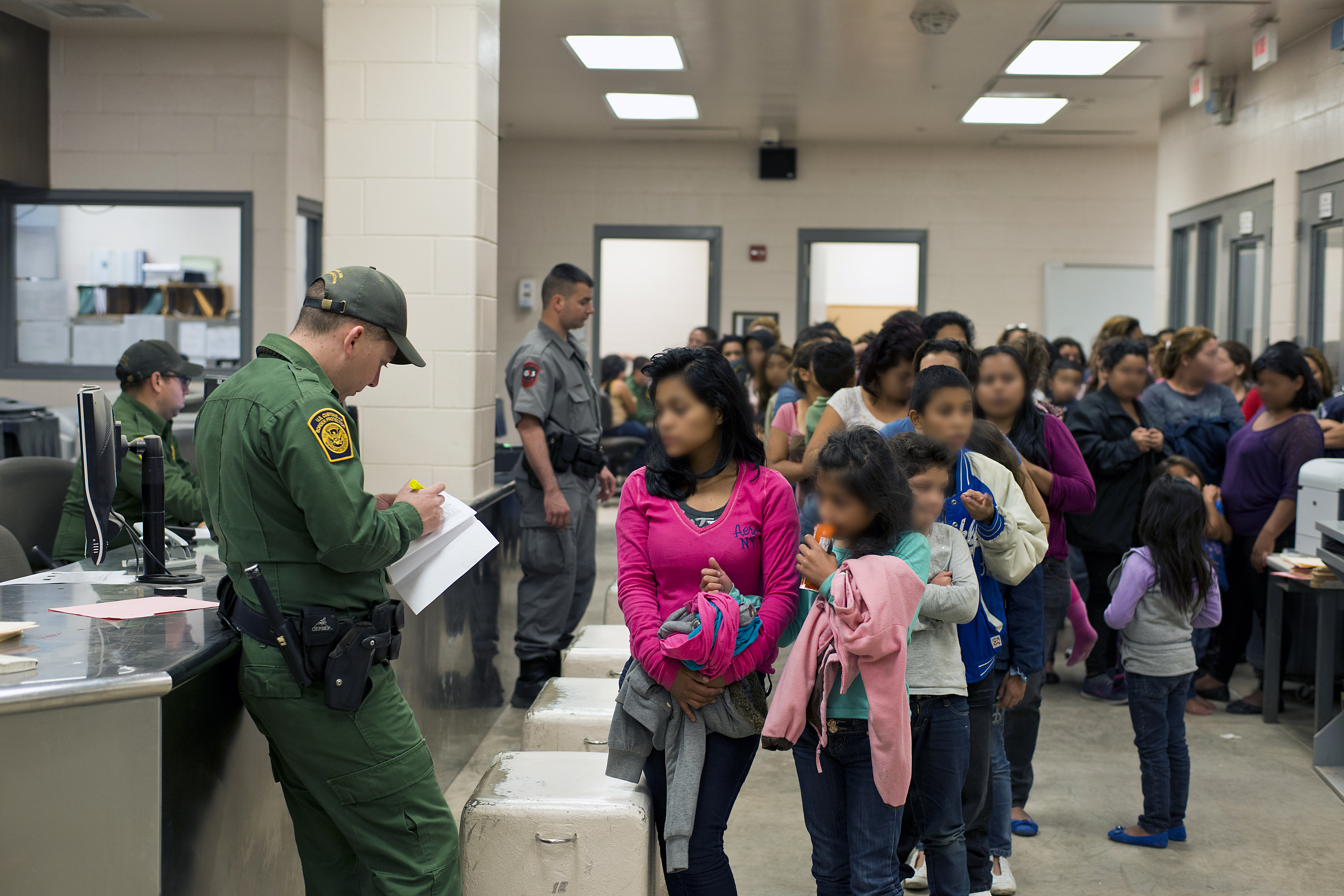
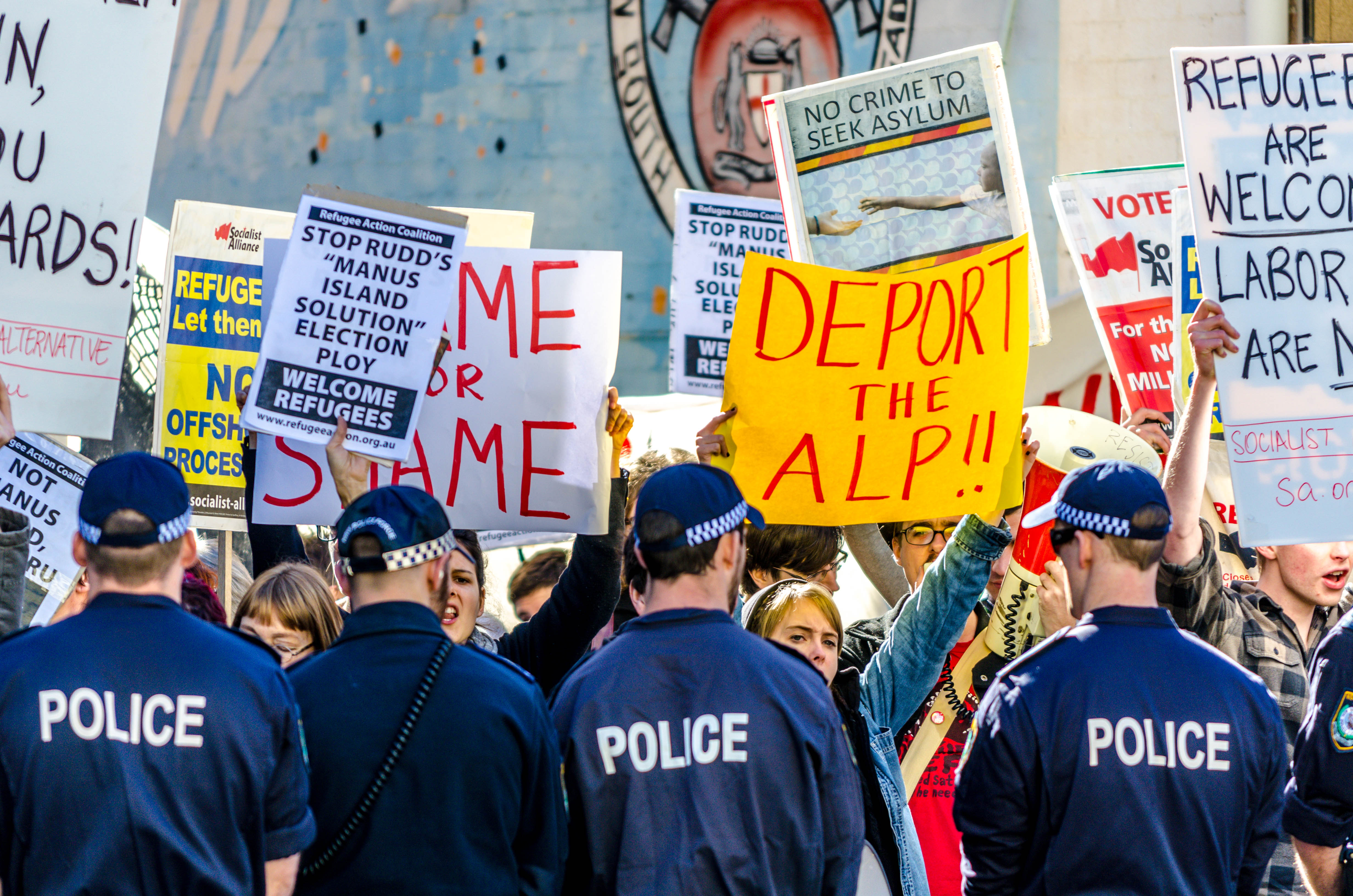
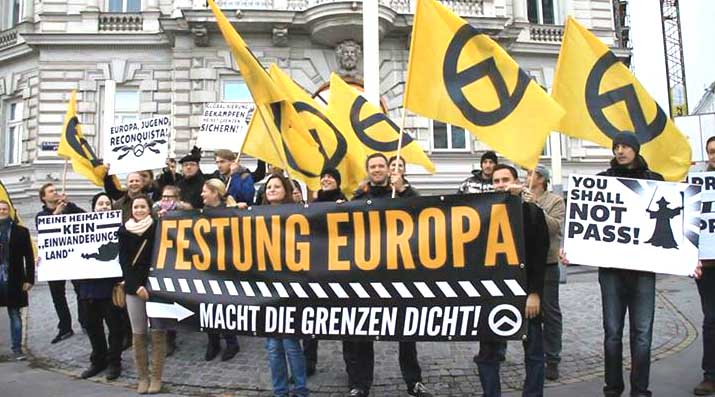
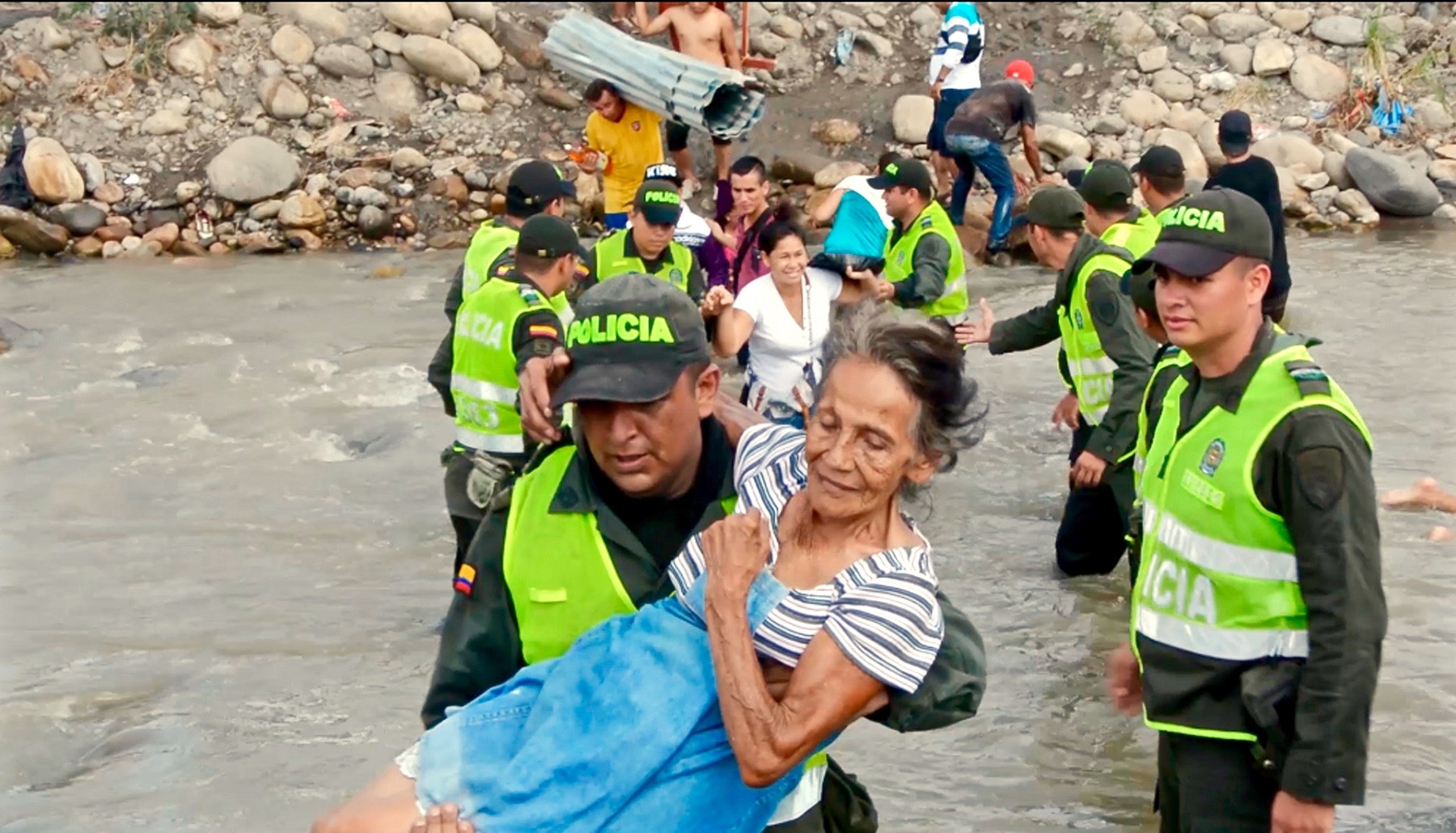
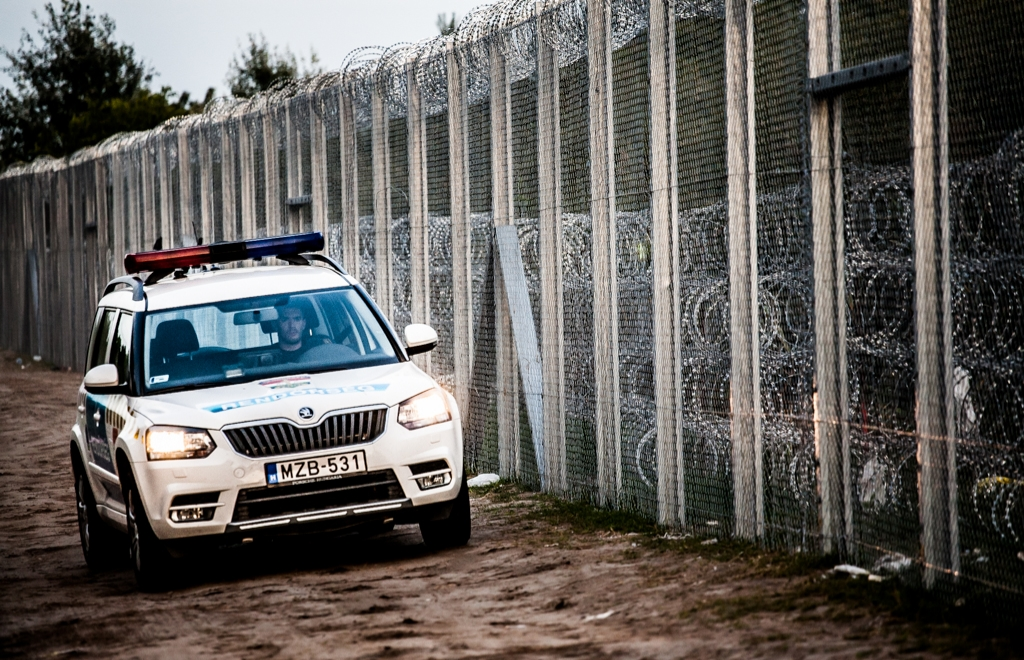
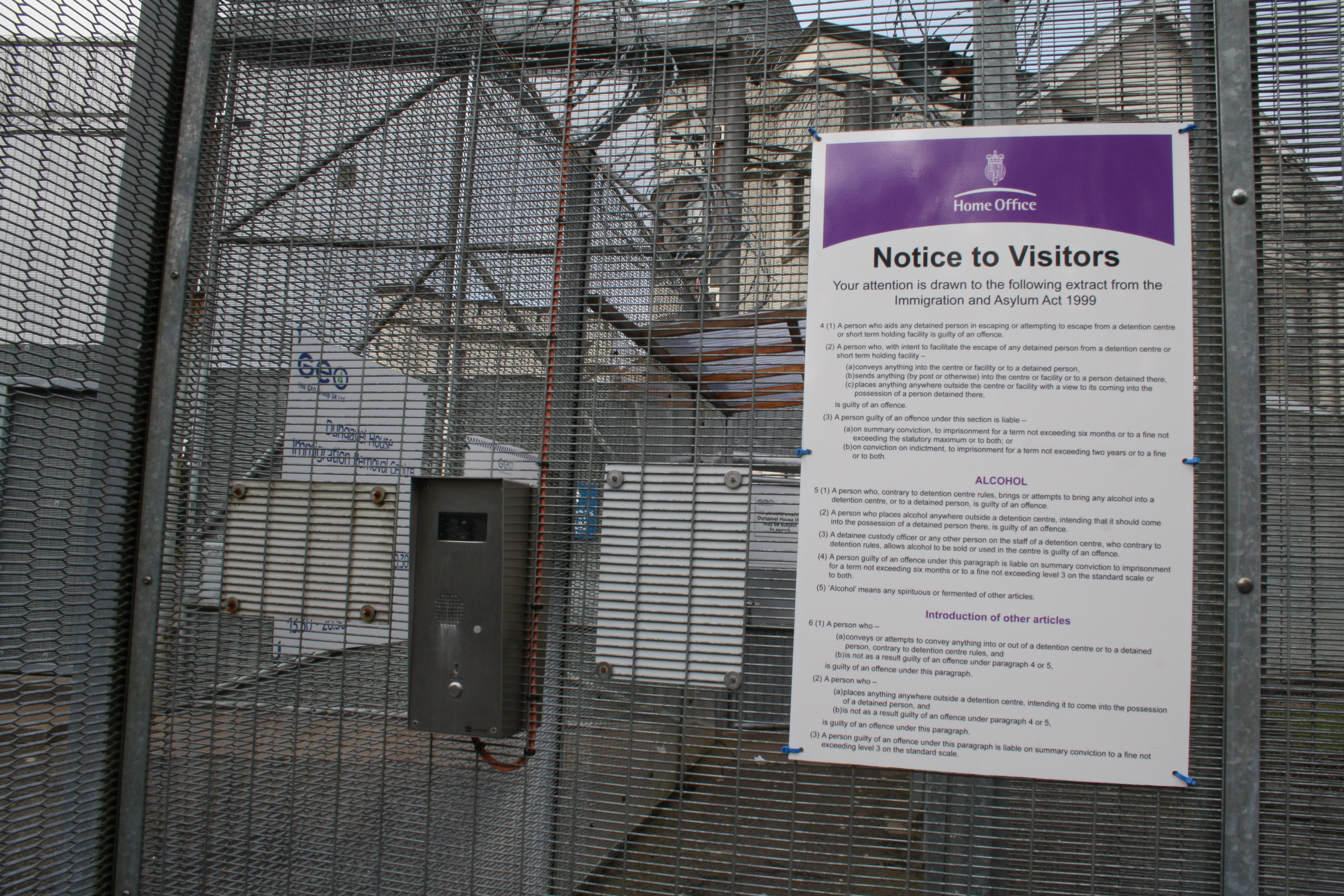
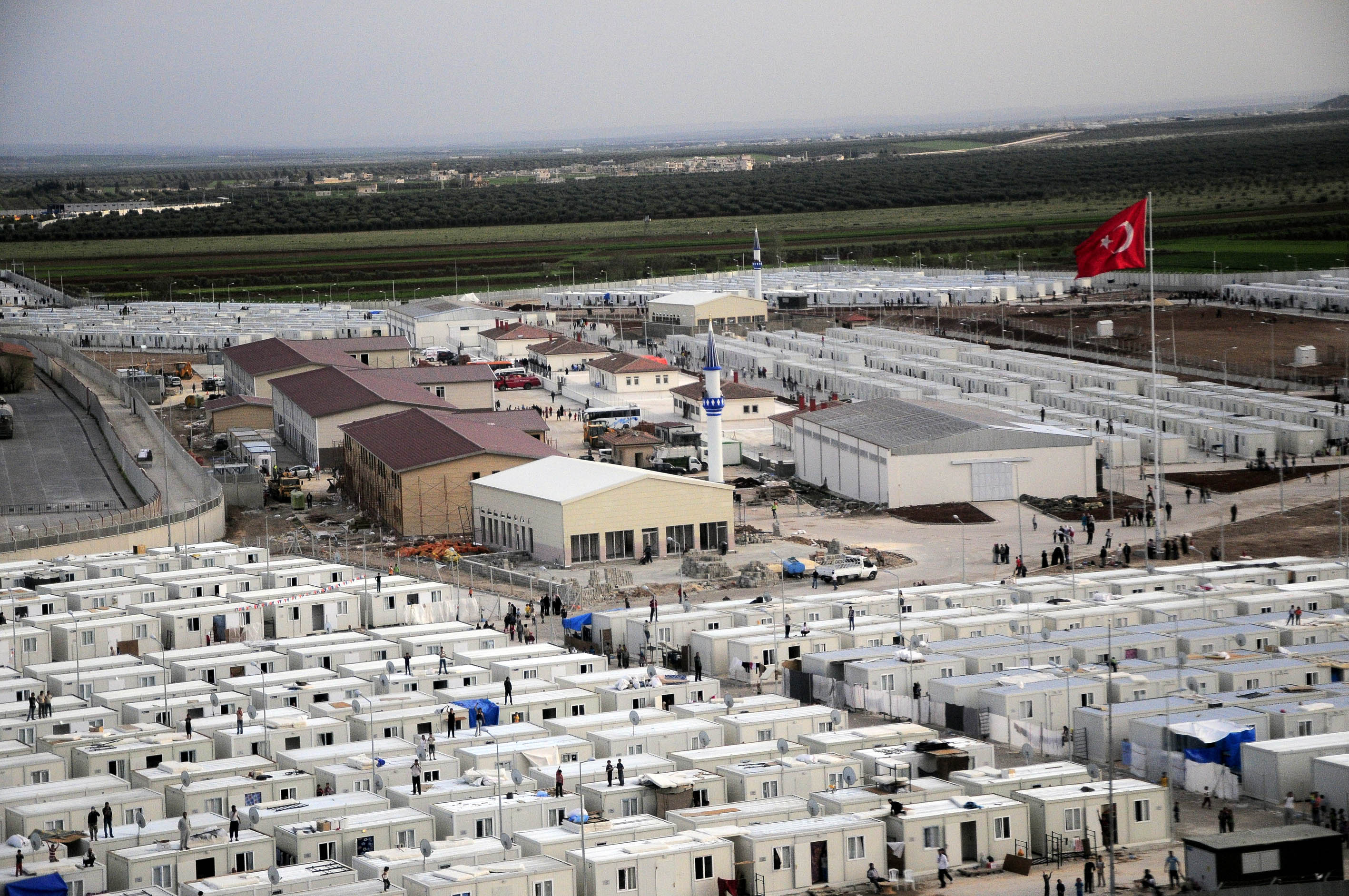
From top left to right: 2014 American immigration crisis, Pacific Solution, Identitarian movement, Venezuela–Colombia migrant crisis, Hungarian border barrier, Dungavel, Kilis Oncupinar Accommodation Facility

A migrant crisis occurs when large numbers of immigrants—including refugees, asylum seekers, or displaced persons—move into a destination country, often overwhelming its systems and communities. These movements are typically triggered by unrest, economic hardship, or political instability in the migrants' countries of origin. The sudden influx of people often strains public services, infrastructure, and social cohesion, placing undue pressure on citizens and local governments. These situations can also raise humanitarian concerns, as existing facilities are rarely equipped to handle large numbers effectively. Notable examples include the European migrant crisis, the English Channel migrant crossings, and post-World War II displacements.

A refugee crisis refers to a movement of large groups of displaced people and may or may not involve a migrant crisis. Compared to a refugee crisis (refugee is a refugee), migrant crises often involve distinguishing between the "deserving" refugee from the "undeserving" migrant. This plays into fear of cultural, religious, and ethnic difference in the midst of increasingly intense, excessive, and persistent worry and fear over a lack of predictability, job security, and material or psychological welfare for many in Europe (such as in closure of Green Borders).

Migrant crisis management involves dealing with issues (such as the immigration system, resource management, etc.) before, during, and after they have occurred. According to the Global Crisis Centre of professional services firm PwC, migrant crisis management is shaped using the definitions and responsibilities outlined in the UN's Convention Relating to the Status of Refugees and subsequent Protocol Relating to the Status of Refugees. It involves international solidarity and burden-sharing with collaboration, communication and information dissemination, which are needed for solving migratory issues of the world.

== Crisis management ==
Immigrant receiving states need effective management strategies for achieving a set of tasks for responding to the reasons of crisis to re-establish a perceived normalcy.

Transboundary crisis management involves co-decision, shared procedures and collective instruments aligned with the steps below:

- Detection: Recognition of threat. (process: emerging-timely)
- Sense-making: critical information for picture of the situation. (process: the collecting, analyzing, and sharing)
- Decision-making: formulation of an effective strategy (process: formulation of key decisions)
- Coordination: collaboration between key partners.
- Meaning-making: Messaging on the path taken (process: explanation, actionable advice, and a sense).
- Communication: message delivery (victims, citizens, stakeholders, ...).
- Accountability: Production of documents that list the decisions and strategies.

=== European migrant crisis ===
Management of the crisis shows a succession of four scenarios.

1. (2011 fall of Gaddafi) Libya let the flow of irregular migrants. The EU Commission approves "Communication on Global Approach to Migration and Mobility" (GAMM).
2. (November 2013-October 2014) Italy's humanitarian Operation Mare Nostrum.
3. (November 2014-September 2015) The EU recognizes humanitarian and migratory pressures, shelves GAMM and develops another comprehensive approach
4. (October 2015) Migrants and refugees: the European Council secures the borders against the unwanted migrants and refugees. (Valletta Summit on Migration)

=== Role of NGO ===
The Washington, D.C.-based Migration Policy Institute is an institution working in this area. Global Crisis Centre of PricewaterhouseCoopers focuses on migrant crisis management.

== Crisis and the immigration system ==
Broken immigration system is what immigration experts and lawyers refer to as failure in the management of "push and pull factors." Push forces for the displaced people are summarized as running from horrors and poverty in the departure country toward a broken immigration system in the receiving states. Pull forces are receiving states having a functioning economy, a safer journey with the help of communication technology and established smuggler networks which have faster ways to move people. The condition of refugees or asylum seekers in receiving countries, from the perspective of governments, employers, and citizens, is a topic of continual debate, and on the other end, the violation of migrant human rights is an ongoing crisis.

=== Immigration reform ===
According to Salil Shetty, Secretary General of Amnesty International,

"It is within world leaders' power to prevent these crises from spiralling further out of control. Governments must halt their assault on our rights and strengthen the defences the world has put in place to protect them. Human rights are a necessity, not an accessory; and the stakes for humankind have never been higher."

— Secretary General of Amnesty International

== Crisis and resource management ==
Broken resource management for immigrants is part of the broader failure to develop efficient responses to people in need, contributing to the crisis. Asylum offices in the US, the United Kingdom, and Australia manage immigration services.

=== United States ===
During the 2014 American immigration crisis, immigration courts as well as the U.S. Citizenship and Immigration Services (USCIS) asylum system were completely under-resourced and confronting an unmanageable caseload. In June 2019, five years into the crisis, more than 350 "unaccompanied children" were removed from a holding facility in Texas to bring it into compliance, as it was designed to hold around 120.

Resource management towards immigrants in the US includes private sector involvement, as listed in the Immigration Reform and Control Act of 1986. The law requires all companies to assist the federal government under 8 U.S.C. § 1324a. Specific immigration areas where human resource managers must ensure compliance by meeting the legal requirements of this immigration reform regulation by incorporating the Immigration and Naturalization Services (INS) Form I-9 into their hiring processes.

Another case for resource management for the migrant crisis is the Mexico–United States border wall. President Trump signed Executive Order 13767, which formally directed the US government to begin constructing the wall. Executive Order 13767 was followed by the 2018 federal government shutdown due to the presidential veto on any spending bill that did not include resources for wall funding. In February 2019, Trump signed a Declaration of National Emergency, saying the situation is a "crisis," officially declaring a "Migrant Crisis" on the Mexico–United States border.

According to a New York Times article, thousands of people who migrated to the US in 2022 will fail to meet asylum requirements due to limited access to resources and legal assistance.

=== European Union ===
Migrant crises have financially burdened EU countries. Germany allocated roughly 10 billion euros for the cost of refugee care and acceptance in 2015. On the other hand, Greece was exempt from paying into EU-wide refugee sharing initiatives between 2013 and 2015. The migrant crisis is believed to have influenced policies in countries seeking accession to the EU, such as Serbia.

=== United Kingdom ===
Resource management for immigrants in the UK is managed under the National Asylum Support Service (NASS), which is responsible for regulating entry to, and settlement in the UK. NASS is a section of the UK Visas and Immigration (UKVI) division of the Home Office, which supports "otherwise be destitute." Provision of accommodation is part of the process.

== Criticism of the term "crisis" ==
According to migration researcher Hein de Haas, the notion of a global refugee crisis is unjustified because it is not supported by long-term data. In reality, refugees make up only a small portion of the world's population and an even smaller share of the total international migrant population. Since the 1950s, the number of refugees worldwide has remained relatively stable between 0.1% and 0.35% of the global population, depending on the scale of conflicts at the time. This means that, although there are fluctuations in refugee numbers due to wars and other crises, these figures do not indicate a long-term or continuous increase.

The vast majority of refugees remain in their region of origin, often in neighboring countries. According to UNHCR data from 2017, around 80% of all refugees were hosted in neighboring countries and 85% in developing countries. For example, in 2018, Turkey hosted more than 3.6 million Syrian refugees, while Lebanon accommodated nearly 1 million—over 15% of its population. By contrast, in the same year, only a few hundred thousand Syrians resided in EU countries such as Germany, France, and the UK.

Fears of widespread "false" asylum claims are likewise not supported by the data. The share of approved asylum applications in the EU has remained relatively stable since the 1990s. In 2020, 54% of applications (including appeals) received a positive decision. Recognition rates are particularly high for applicants from conflict-affected countries such as Syria and Eritrea.

Refugee flows are typically temporary and closely linked to the intensity of conflicts. Major migration waves occurred during the Soviet invasion of Afghanistan, the Rwandan genocide, and more recently, the wars in Syria and Ukraine. Once violence subsides, the number of refugees tends to decline.

Although public discourse often portrays a world in crisis, the overall intensity of conflict and violent repression has declined globally compared to earlier periods such as the First and Second World Wars. While conflicts still occur, they tend to be less deadly, and overall global stability has improved. During the First and Second World Wars, an estimated 9.5 million and 60 million people, respectively, were displaced in Europe—figures far exceeding current refugee numbers. The widespread perception of an escalating refugee crisis is therefore partly based on a distorted view of the current global situation.

According to De Haas, the so-called global refugee crisis is largely a myth, amplified by political rhetoric and media narratives. While there are undoubtedly challenges—particularly in border regions—the overall number of refugees is relatively small and stable, with the real burden borne by countries neighboring conflict zones. The perception of an unmanageable refugee crisis in the West, he argues, is a political construct often used to justify stricter border controls and limitations on asylum rights. However, the actual data present a different picture—one in which refugee flows fluctuate in response to conflicts, and the impact on Western countries is much smaller than commonly suggested. Moreover, European countries have proved being capable of handling significantly larger numbers of refugees in the post–World War II decades.

== List of migrant crises ==
- World War II evacuation and expulsion (for the 1940s migration and refugees developments)
- Indochina refugee crisis
- Green March
- 2014 American immigration crisis
- 2015 European migrant crisis
- 2015–2016 German migrant crisis
- English Channel migrant crossings (2018–present)
- 2020 Greek–Turkish border crisis
- 2021 Belarus–European Union border crisis
- Turkish migrant crisis
- Mexico–United States border crisis
- Refugees of the Syrian civil war
- Venezuelan refugee crisis
