= Sabir Zazai =

Sabir Zazai OBE FRSE
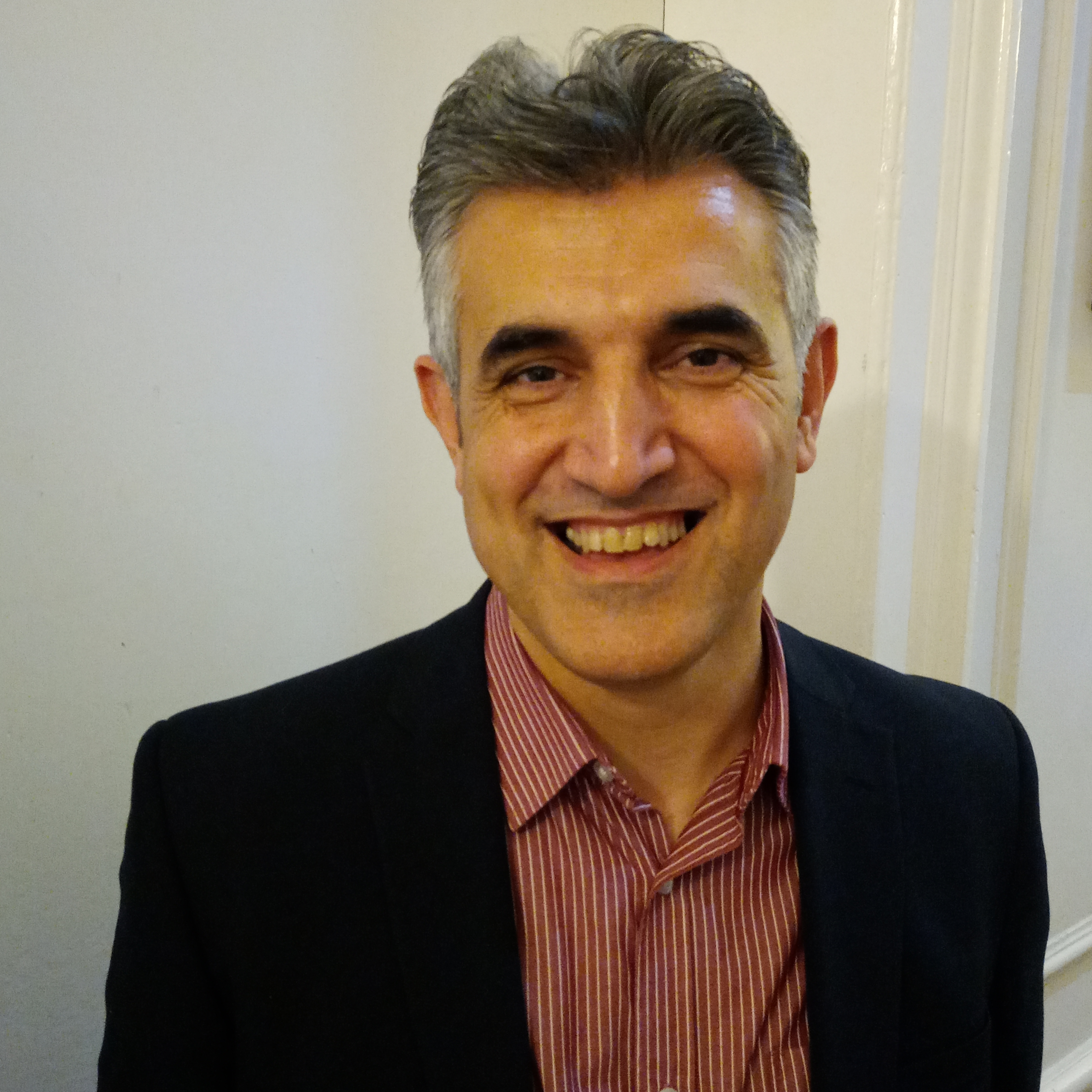
- Zazai in 2022
- Born: circa 1974; Afghanistan
- Occupation: CEO
- Known for: Head of Scottish Refugee Council

Sabir Zazai OBE FRSE is a former refugee from Afghanistan, who became the CEO of the Scottish Refugee Council. He has honorary doctorates from the University of Glasgow, The Open University, University of Dundee and an OBE. Zazai was also conferred with fellowship of Royal Society of Edinburgh in 2022 and the Lord Provost's Award For Human Rights in 2019.

== Life and career ==
Zazai was born in Afghanistan, where his early education was disrupted by the Afghan Civil War. In 1999 he arrived in the UK with only seven years of formal education and he was accommodated in Coventry, as part of the UK's asylum dispersal policy.

In 2002 he began his first job in the UK working with refugee children in Coventry. He was invited to talk at Coventry Cathedral and a friend, Penny Walker, who had started the Coventry Refugee and Migrant Centre, arranged for an interview on the BBC. He spoke to Coventry City Council and asked them to make their city a "City of Sanctuary".

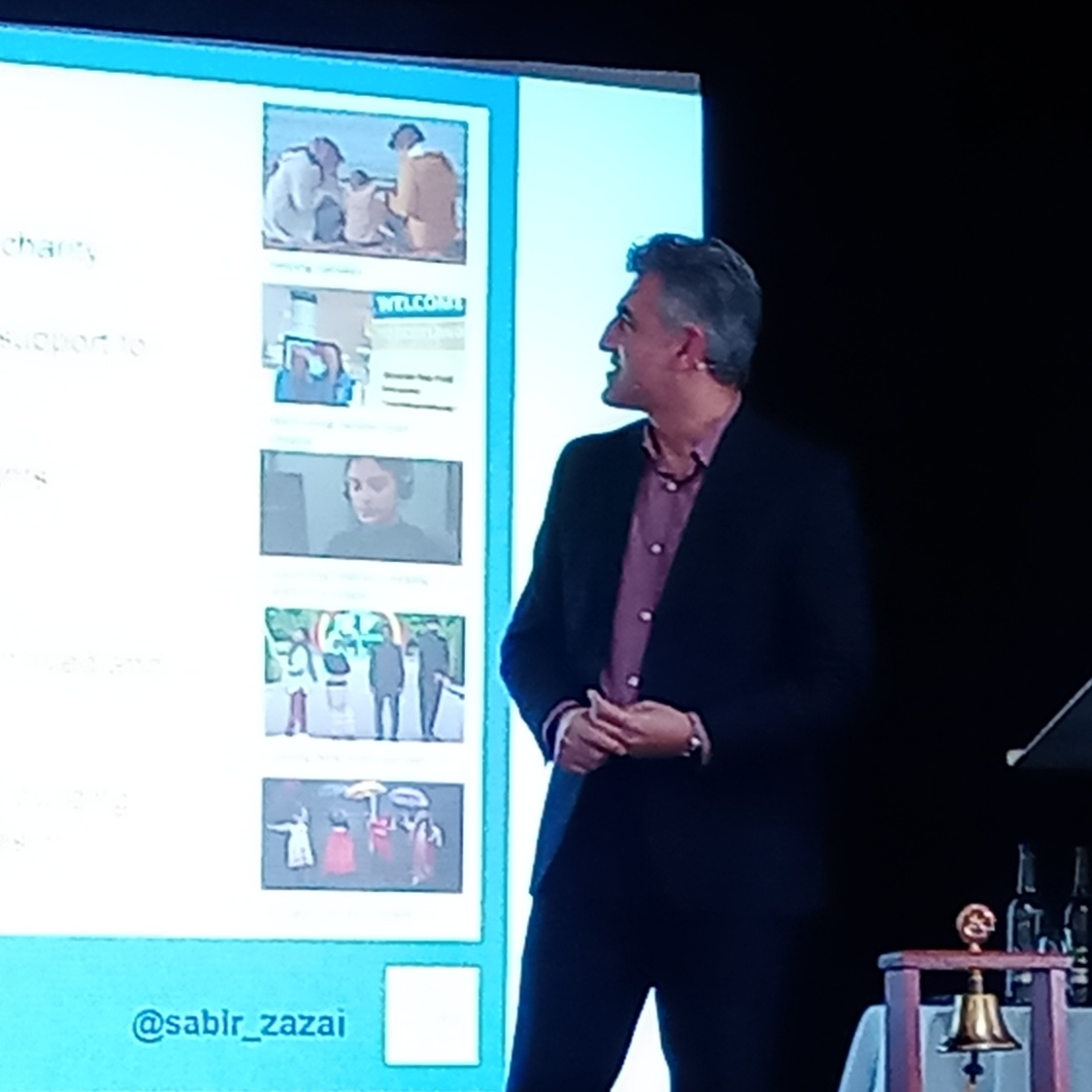
Dr Sabir Zazai talking to a Rotary meeting in 2022

In 2010, Zazai graduated from Coventry University with a degree in Human Resource Management and in 2013, he was awarded an MA in Community Cohesion Management. From 2014, Zazai led the Coventry Refugee and Migrant Centre and this was a charity that previously helped him when he was a refugee. In 2017 he left England and he became the CEO of the Scottish Refugee Council. He made his home in Scotland where he worked with others to ensure that refugees in Scotland are allowed to vote. He was awarded an honorary doctorate from the University of Glasgow in 2019 but the occasion was marred as his father was refused permission to enter the country to witness the ceremony as the authorities said that they thought his father would not return to his country. Two Members of Parliament raised this issue in the House of Commons. Eventually the government reconsidered his fathers application and Zazai's father, Mohammad Zahir Zazai, saw his son receive the doctorate from Prof Alison Phipps, and he met two of his grandchildren for the first time. At the same event the editor-in-chief of The Guardian, Katharine Viner, who had supported Zazai, also received an honorary doctorate. In the same year Zazai received the Lord Provost's Award for Human Rights.

Zazai joined many others including the Archbishop of Canterbury who were objecting to the UK government's policy of moving refugees to Rwanda. He was awarded an Order of the British Empire (OBE) in 2022.

He is the Honorary President of City of Sanctuary (UK) and a Visiting Practice Fellow of the Centre for Trust Peace and Social Relations at Coventry University. He served as a Council Member of Coventry Cathedral, advising the Bishop of Coventry on interfaith and refugee issues. The Bishop is a friend.
