= British Aerospace plc v Green =

- Court: Court of Appeal of England and Wales
- Citation: [1995] ICR 1006

Keywords
- Redundancy

British Aerospace plc v Green [1995] ICR 1006 is a UK labour law case, concerning redundancy.

== Facts ==
British Aerospace decided that 530 jobs needed to be reduced from its 7000 strong plant. All 7000 were given individual assessments. Of the 530 dismissed, 235 of the low scorers contested the dismissals’ fairness. British Aerospace refused to disclose the forms of the ones not dismissed.

The Tribunal held the forms had to be disclosed. British Aerospace appealed.

== Judgment ==
Waite LJ held the forms did not need to be disclosed unless it was to deal with a specific issue that had been raised, like an allegation that the wrong criteria were used on a particular employee. Any close scrutiny of how the transparent objective procedure is applied would be too much of an interference with the legitimacy of the employer's discretion. The Employment Appeal Tribunal was right to overturn the Tribunal because, first, the quick settlement of disputes spoke in favour of not requiring disclosure, given the absence of special circumstances for it. And second, the rule that documents only need to be disclosed when an issue is raised is in tune with county court rule O 14 R 8(1).

...it becomes the task of the industrial tribunal to determine whether, in all the circumstances of each particular case, the employers have succeeded in providing a response to the tension between them which comes within the range of reasonableness…

[...]

...in general the employer who sets up a system of selection which can reasonably be described as fair and applies it without any overt sign of conduct which mars its fairness will have done all that the law requires of him.

[...]

To have forced their disclosure for the purposes of an exercise in comparison designed to provide individual applicants with grounds for specific allegations of anomaly or mistake in particular instances would have done nothing to ease the task in hand—which was limited to the selection of sample cases—and would have run a serious risk of subjecting these multiple applications to procedural chaos.
