= Scottish council =

Scottish council may refer to:

- Scottish Arts Council, a Scottish public body
- Scottish council, a form of local government in Scotland
- Scottish Council for Development and Industry, a non-governmental, membership organisation which aims to strengthen Scotland’s economic competitiveness
- Scottish Council for Voluntary Organisations, the national body representing the voluntary sector in Scotland
- Scottish Funding Council, the body in Scotland that distributes funding from the Scottish Executive to the country's colleges and universities
- Scottish Refugee Council, a charity
- Scottish Council of the Labour Party, the name of the Scottish Labour Party from 1900 to 1994
