= Stephen Hale =

Stephen or Steven Hale may refer to:

- Stephen Hale (charity executive), British charity executive
- Stephen F. Hale (1818–1862), American politician and military officer
- Stephen Hale (bishop), Australian bishop
- Steven Hale, British orienteering competitor
- Steve Hale (Full House), character from the American television sitcom Full House (1987–1995)
- Steve Hale (politician), member of the Mississippi State Senate

== See also ==
- Stephen Hales (disambiguation)
