= Independent Asylum Commission =

The Independent Asylum Commission (IAC) was an organisation which attempted to "conduct a truly independent review of the UK asylum system from beginning to end." The commission was made up of groups of citizens from local churches, mosques, trade union branches, schools, and other various community groups from the London Citizens and Birmingham Citizens. The Commission was independent of the UK government and the refugee sector, and was funded entirely by charitable trusts. It sought to examine key stages of the asylum process such as the access to the asylum through its determination process, the appeals process, treatment of vulnerable groups, and material support and accommodation. The commission held public hearings throughout the UK between January and November 2007. It published its initial findings in March 2008 and then three full reports over summer 2008. The initial report said that the UK's treatment of asylum seekers falls "seriously below" the standards of a civilised society. The Border and Immigration Agency rejected the report, claiming it operates a "firm but humane" system.

== Background ==
The United Kingdom has a long history of providing asylum. The 1951 Refugee Convention states that a refugee is "owing to well-founded fear of being persecuted for reasons of race, religion, nationality, membership of a particular social group or political opinion, is outside the country of his nationality and is unable or, owing to such fear, is unwilling to avail himself of the protection of that country; or who, not having a nationality and being outside the country of his former habitual residence as a result of such events, is unable or, owing to such fear, is unwilling to return to it."

The commission, made up of groups of citizens, believed that the UK had a duty to provide adequate sanctuary for these defined refugees. It was created with the intent "to take a fresh and impartial look at the system and make credible recommendations for reform. The commissioners on the board included asylum experts and a former immigration judge. After over a year (January 2007 – March 2008) the Commission published their initial findings report, followed by two subsequent reports. The commission worked in conjunction with CITIZENS Organising Foundation, which ran the campaign and aided in funding. Under CITIZENS Organising Foundation, it was referred to as the CITIZENS for Sanctuary campaign.

== Key commissioners list ==
List of commissioners:

- Sir John Waite (Co-Chair) - A former judge of both the High Court and the Court of Appeal, as well as former President of the Employment Tribunal and Chair of UNICEF UK.
- Ifath Nawaz (Co-Chair) - President of the Association of Muslim Lawyers (at the time of serving in the commission), as well as a member of the Policing and Security group as appointed by the Prime Minister. She also served on the Commission for the Lunar House Report.
- Countess of Mar - A member of the House of Lords and the original Earldom of Mar. She previously sat on the tribunal for Asylum and Immigration, which overheard immigration appeals. She left this tribunal when she lost faith in the current system, leading her to the IAC.
- Shamit Saggar
- Nicholas Sagovsky - A professor and Canon Theologian at Westminster Abbey. He served as a commissioner of the South London Citizens Lunar House Report.
- Katie Ghose
- David Ramsbotham, Baron Ramsbotham GCB CBE - A former army general. He also served under Her Majesty as Chief Inspector of Prisons from December 1995 and August 2001.
- Dr. Silvia Casale - Appointed member of the United Nations subcommittee on the Prevention of Torture. She was also the President of the European Committee for the Prevention of Torture and Inhumane or Degrading Treatment or Punishment. Her past also includes freelance research and academia.
- Earl of Sandwich - A member in the House of Lords. He held interest in immigration and issues relating to refugees.
- Zrinka Bralo - A journalist from Sarajevo. She campaigned for refugee rights and human rights since her exile from Sarajevo in 1993. She served as Executive Director of the Migrant and Refugee Communities Forum held in West London.
- Bishop Patrick Lynch - At the time, he was the Auxiliary Bishop for the Roman Catholic Archdiocese of Southwark. He did extensive work in several different migrant communities in his ministry. He was later ordained a bishop in 2006.
- Jacqueline Parlevliet - At the time of the commission she was the Deputy Representative of the United Nations High Commissioner for Refugees in London.

== Responses to the Commission ==
There were several different responses, both to the creation of the commission itself, as well as the commissions findings.

=== Scotland ===
The Scottish Refugee Council welcomed the IAC into Scotland and issued a formal response. This council also provided the IAC with any materials or evidence that they might need and showed an eagerness to aid them in their research. Later, in their reports, the IAC would praise Scottish leadership in setting an example for humane asylum and sanctuary practices.

Later, in May 2007, Unison Scotland issued a response to the IAC's review on the asylum system. Unison Scotland statement said that they were pleased to note the creation of the IAC and their reports and welcome the opportunity to aid the commission in reviewing the entirety of the asylum system in the UK.

=== Response to the interim report ===
Migration Watch UK responded to the IAC's interim report on 27 March 2008. In the response, they were disappointed, stating that the IAC ignored the fact that 60% of all asylum claims were rejected as being "not genuine." Sir Andrew Green, the chairman of Migration Watch, issued a statement where he said "Like them, we fully support a welcome for genuine refugees who are fleeing persecution. They now amount to only 3% of immigration but the extent of false claims and the failure to remove those concerned remain serious problems."
