= Katie Ghose =

Electoral reform campaigner

- Born: Katie Sushila Ratna Ghose; 1970 (age 55–56); Shoreham by Sea, Sussex, England, UK
- Education: Somerville College, Oxford
- Known for: charity chief executive

Katie Sushila Ratna Ghose (born July 1970) is a British charity chief executive and campaigner. In May 2026 she was appointed chief executive of the Refugee Council, a national charity for refugees and people seeking asylum in England.

She was previously Chief Executive of KIDS, the Women's Aid Federation of England and the Electoral Reform Society.

== Personal life and education ==
Ghose was born in Shoreham by Sea, Sussex, to an Indian father and English mother. She went to Boundstone Community College in Lancing, Sussex and Brighton, Hove & Sussex Sixth Form College. Ghose read law at Somerville College, Oxford. During her time at Oxford, she was editor of the student newspaper Cherwell. She then studied for a master's degree in Political Science at the University of California, Riverside.

== Career ==
In the early part of her career Ghose worked in politics, law and charities. She worked as a parliamentary researcher and senior caseworker for a Labour MP Greville Janner (1992–1994) and was then Parliamentary Officer for the National Association of Citizens Advice Bureau (1994–1995). Ghose qualified and practised as a barrister (1997–1999), specialising in immigration, family and Human Rights law. Following her two-year law career she wrote Beyond the Courtroom: a lawyer's guide to campaigning, which was published by the Legal Action Group in 2005.

On her return to the charity sector Ghose worked for the Child Accident Prevention Trust (1999–2000) and for Age Concern (2000–2005) as their National Campaigns and Parliamentary Affairs Manager, leading campaigns to protect older workers from discrimination and to oppose unfair hospital charges.

In 2005 she was appointed Director of the British Institute of Human Rights, providing charities, hospitals and care homes with practical support and training about human rights in England.

She joined the Electoral Reform Society as Chief Executive in 2010, and was a regular media commentator on elections and voter disengagement.

Ghose is a council member of St George's House, Windsor Castle and was a trustee from 2019-2025. In 2025 she was appointed co-Chair of Womankind Worldwide. She was an independent council member of the University of Sussex (2015-2024), a board member of the US democracy group Fair Vote (2010–2017), a trustee and Company Secretary of Stonewall (2005–2011), and was chair of two charities, Asylum Aid (1997–1999) and Bail for Immigration Detainees (2002–2004). She also served as a Commissioner on the Independent Asylum Commission from 2006 to 2008.

She became Chief Executive of the Refugee Council in 2026.

== Politics ==
Ghose served as CEO of Women's Aid from 2017 to 2019. She left by mutual agreement after video emerged of her online thanking UKIP and particularly the party's then-MP Douglas Carswell for their support for electoral reform .

After serving as a parliamentary aide to Labour MP Greville Janner Ghose sought selection as a Labour Party Parliamentary candidate in a number of constituencies prior to the 2015 general election. Her applications to represent constituencies as diverse as Grimsby, Stoke-on-Trent North, Brighton Kemptown and York were all unsuccessful.

== 2011 AV referendum ==
Ghose became Chief Executive of the Electoral Reform Society in the autumn of 2010, during which she worked for six months as chair of the unsuccessful 'Yes! to Fairer Votes' campaign.

== See also ==
- Electoral Reform Society
