= Maeve Sherlock =

British politician and priest (born 1960)

The Reverend and Right Honourable The Baroness Sherlock OBE
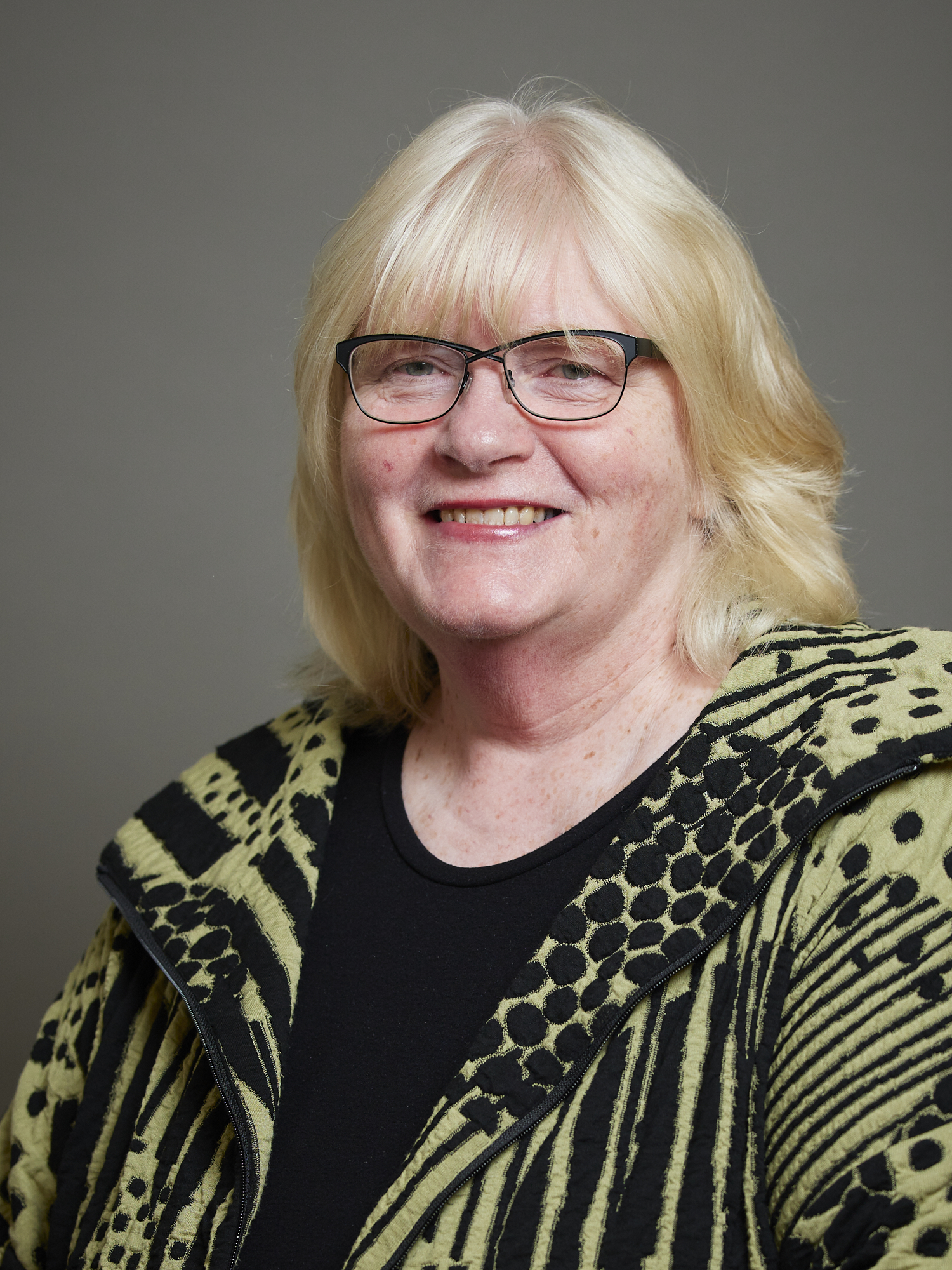
- Official portrait, 2022

Minister of State for Families, Poverty and Social Security (Note: Parliamentary Under-Secretary of State from 9 July 2024 till 17 December 2024)
- Incumbent
- Assumed office 9 July 2024
- Prime Minister: Keir Starmer; Andy Burnham
- Preceded by: The Viscount Younger of Leckie

Member of the House of Lords
- Lord Temporal
- Life peerage 17 June 2010
Shadow portfolios
2023–2024	Faith
2013–2024	Work and Pensions
2021–2022	Education
2015–2020	Senior Whip
2013–2015	Whip

Personal details
- Born: Maeve Christina Mary Sherlock; 10 November 1960 (age 65) Finsbury Park, London, England
- Party: Labour
- Education: University of Liverpool; Open University; St Chad's College, Durham

Maeve Christina Mary Sherlock, Baroness Sherlock, OBE (born 10 November 1960) is a British politician serving as a Member of the House of Lords since 2010. A member of the Labour Party, she is an ordained priest of the Church of England.

== Early life and education ==
Maeve Christina Mary Sherlock was born on 10 November 1960 in Finsbury Park, London. She was educated at Our Lady's Abingdon in Abingdon on Thames.

Sherlock read Sociology at the University of Liverpool, and later received a Master of Business Administration from the Open University. She served as President of the National Union of Students from 1988 to 1990.

== Career ==
Sherlock was director of the UK Council for Overseas Student Affairs from 1991 until 1997, when she became chief executive of the National Council for One Parent Families. She was appointed an officer of the Order of the British Empire in the 2000 New Year Honours.

Sherlock worked as a member of the Council of Economic Advisers from 2000 to 2003, advising the Chancellor of the Exchequer on social issues. She later became a trustee of think tank Demos.

Sherlock was chief executive of the Refugee Council from 2003 to 2006. A member of the Equality and Human Rights Commission from 2007 to 2010, she chaired the National Student Forum during the same period.

Sherlock has been non-executive director of the Financial Ombudsman Service board since 2008. She was also non-executive director of the Child Maintenance and Enforcement Commission from 2008 to 2010.

=== House of Lords ===
On 17 June 2010, Sherlock was created a life peer as Baroness Sherlock, of Durham in the County of Durham. She was introduced in the House of Lords on 5 July 2010, where she sits as a member of the Labour Party. She made her maiden speech on 5 October 2010.

Sherlock was appointed an opposition whip in March 2013, and a Work and Pensions spokesperson in October 2013. She was promoted to serve as a senior whip from May 2015 until April 2020, when she stepped down from the position. She was an Education spokesperson from May 2021 to May 2022.

On 9 July 2024, she was appointed a Parliamentary Under-Secretary of State at the Department for Work and Pensions. She was promoted to Minister of State on 17 December 2024. In July 2026, she was reappointed to the new government by Andy Burnham.

=== Church of England ===
Sherlock is an Honorary Fellow and Tutor at St Chad's College, Durham, where she studied for a doctorate in Theology.

Sherlock trained for ordained ministry at St Mellitus College from 2016 until 2018, when she was ordained as a Church of England deacon. She served her curacy at St Nicholas Church, Durham (St Nics) from 2018 to 2022. She was ordained a priest at Durham Cathedral in June 2019. In 2022, she was appointed a non-stipendiary priest vicar at Westminster Abbey, and was also licensed as non-stipendiary associate vicar at St Nics.

== Notes ==
Political offices
Preceded by Vicky Phillips	President of the National Union of Students; 1988–1990	Succeeded by Stephen Twigg
Non-profit organization positions
Preceded by Nick Hardwick	Chief Executive of the Refugee Council; 2003–2006	Succeeded by Donna Covey
