= Anne Curwen =

British charity executive (1889–1973)

Dame Anne May Curwen, OBE DBE (7 May 1889 – 13 September 1973) was an English educator and charity worker. She was the National General Secretary of the YWCA of Great Britain, was secretary of the Scottish Women's Hospitals for Foreign Service (SWH) and founded the British Council for Aid to Refugees.

== Life ==
Curwen was born on 7 May 1889. Her father William Curwen died in 1896 and her mother Emma Curwen (possibly née Cook) died in 1901. She was educated at Birkenhead High School for Girls and Harrogate College, attending Newnham College, Cambridge, where she took the Historical Tripos and gained a First in History.

After graduating from university, Curwen worked as "History Mistress" at Orme Girls’ School in Newcastle-under-Lyme, Staffordshire. After her teaching career and the outbreak of World War I, the Scottish Women's Hospitals for Foreign Service (SWH) was founded by Dr Elsie Inglis to support the war effort. Curwen became the secretary of the Scottish Women's Hospitals in 1916. In 1922, she was awarded Jugo-Slav Order of St Sava (3rd Class) in recognition of her war work.

In 1919, she joined the YWCA as education secretary, then as National General Secretary from 1930–1949. During this period, she described herself as having a "feminist soul." In 1937, she was appointed OBE in the Coronation Honours.

During World War II, Curwen travelled and worked across Europe and became interested in the plight of refugees. In 1951, Curwen founded the British Council for Aid to Refugees in direct response to the United Nations Convention for Refugees, and sat as President of Council from 1962 until her death. She was the British delegate to the United Nations High Commissioner for Refugees from 1954–58. She was appointed DBE in 1949 for her work helping the homeless and refugees, then was awarded the United Nations Nansen Medal award in 1964.

She died in 1973 in Kensington, London, aged 84.
