= Asylum Support Partnership =

UK asylum seeker support organisation

The Asylum Support Partnership (ASP) is the largest asylum seeker support organisations in the United Kingdom and claims to be the only one giving asylum support over the whole of Britain.

The mission of ASP is to ensure that "all those seeking asylum in Britain have their human rights upheld and that those seeking asylum in our community receive the support and opportunities they need to live independently." Their core values are to "assist all asylum seekers regardless of race, religion, gender, health or sexuality". The consortium provide legal liaison, mentoring and aims to be a 'One Stop Service' for the needs of asylum seekers. Although part funded by the Home Office, Welsh Government, and Scottish Government they are independent of the UK Government as a partnership made of non governmental organisations and are not linked to UK Visas and Immigration and are also engaged in lobbying on legislation and campaigning on asylum issues.

== Role ==
The Asylum Support Partnership (ASP) is the mechanism for by which the United Kingdom carries out and delivers its requirements following the United Nations Convention Relating to the Status of Refugees 1951. By forming a consortium this has enabled the organisations in Britain to carry out joined up Asylum Support since many of the organisations carrying out such services had been started independently in different parts of the country.

The partnership exchanges information, referrals and help documents between the partners and also works with other organisations on asylum issues. The Partnership is rolling out a joint database in 2013 and is working on converging its IT systems to improve on cohesion

== History ==
In 2012 after budget cuts of 72% from Home Office funding; the groups making up the partnership which were semi-formally cooperating and putting in joint UK wide funding bids formally agreed to form the Asylum Support Partnership (ASP).

== Partnership members ==
The six charities making up the partnership delivering advice and other services to asylum seekers in each region of Britain funded by the Home Office, Welsh Government, and Scottish Government are:

- Refugee Council: London, East of England, Yorkshire and Humberside, West Midlands
- Refugee Action: North West, East Midlands, South Central, South West
- North of England Refugee Service: North East
- Scottish Refugee Council: Scotland
- Welsh Refugee Council: Wales
- Northern Refugee Centre: Yorkshire and Humberside
