= Stephen Hales (disambiguation) =

Stephen Hales (1677–1761) was a clergyman and scientist.

Stephen Hales may also refer to:

- Stephen Hales (MP for Norfolk) (died 1394/5), MP for Norfolk
- Stephen Hales (died 1574), MP for Leicester

== See also ==
- Stephen Hale (disambiguation)
