= Wilberforce Way =

Walking route in England

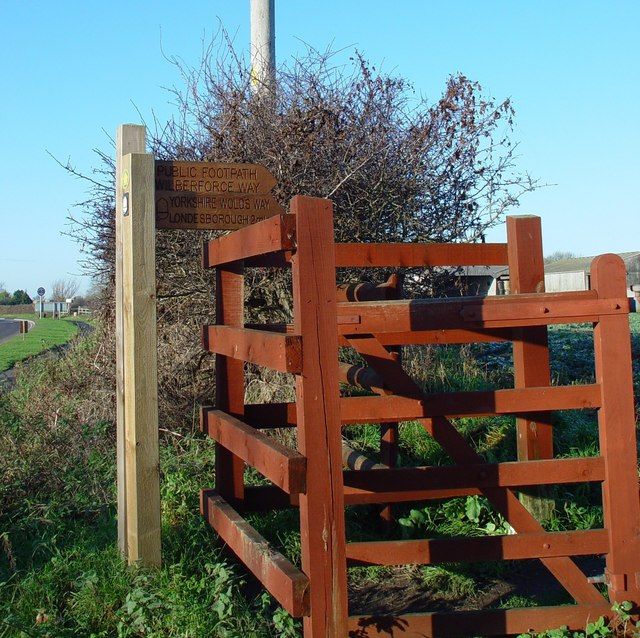
- The Kissing Gate near Market Weighton
- Length: 60 mi (97 km)
- Location: North Yorkshire & East Riding of Yorkshire, England
- Trailheads: The Deep, Hull 53°44′19.29″N 0°19′49.6″W; York Minster, 53°57′44.45″N 1°4′55.50″W
- Use: Hiking
- Highest point: 433 ft (132 m)
- Lowest point: 30 ft (9.1 m)
- Difficulty: Challenging
- Sights: Beverley Minster;York Minster
- Hazards: Road crossings; Steep ascents and descents

The Wilberforce Way is a 60-mile (97 km) walking route between Hull in the East Riding of Yorkshire and York. The walk has been devised so that it can be walked in its entirety or as thirteen smaller walks. It has been described as having sufficient places of worship on the route for it to be used as a walk of pilgrimage.

== History ==
The Wilberforce Way was devised as a tribute to mark the bicentenary of the abolition of the British Transatlantic Slave Trade in the 1807 Act of Parliament introduced by Hull born William Wilberforce. Inderjit Bhogal was among those who led this idea for commemoration. The route was first published in 2007 and had been designed and described by John Eckersley. The route uses waymarkers that have the name with a picture of a broken chain on a black and white disc.

== Route ==
This section is sourced from UK GPS routes and Ordnance Survey Landranger Maps.

=== Hull to Beverley ===
The route starts at The Deep in the Old Harbour district of Hull. It crosses the River Hull on the nearby footbridge and goes along the riverside path to the North Bridge where it re-crosses the river and joins the cycle path on Spive Street and heads north as far as Chamberlain Road. Here the path returns to the riverside and follows it all the way to Skidby Landing where it heads inland and joins the Beverley Road out of the city boundary. At Thearne the path turns to follow the Beverley and Barmston Drain, a small waterway, as far as Figham before returning to the main road. In Beverley, the path passes the Minster and St Mary's Church. It winds it way through the outskirts to join the Hudson Way, a disused rail trail along the former York to Beverley Line, close to the A1035. In Beverley the route crosses or follows the following Hiking Routes: Minster Way, Haunted Way, East Riding Heritage Way and Hutton Hike.

=== Beverley to Market Weighton ===
The Way diverts off the Hudson Way at Cherry Burton, passing the Church of St Michael and All Angels. It exits the village via Etton Road towards Etton crossing the old railway bridge over the Hudson Way before rejoining the disused railway line. The Way diverts along the Yorkshire Wolds Way into the village of Goodmanham and follows it into Market Weighton. In the town centre the route swings around All Saints Church before heading north towards the A614.

=== Market Weighton to Pocklington ===
The Way crosses the A164 and into the village of Londesborough, passing All Saints Church. It then passes through the hamlets of Nunburnholme and Kilnwick Percy before joining the Chalkland Way and heading east into Pocklington. The town is home to Pocklington School that William Wilberforce attended from 1771 to 1776. The route heads south out of the town after the Church of All Saints.

=== Pocklington to York ===
The route follows the Pocklington Canal as far as the point it crosses the B1228 at which point it joins the road through Sutton-Upon-Derwent. The route crosses the River Derwent just outside Elvington, but skirts the village rather going through it as it merges with the Jorvic Way as far as Wheldrake. The route heads north out of the village, crossing over the A64 and into the Heslington suburb of York at the University. The route then heads west across Walmgate Stray and the A19 (Fulford Road) to the east bank of the River Ouse. The final leg along the river ends at Lendal Bridge where it turns towards its terminus at York Minster.

== Images ==
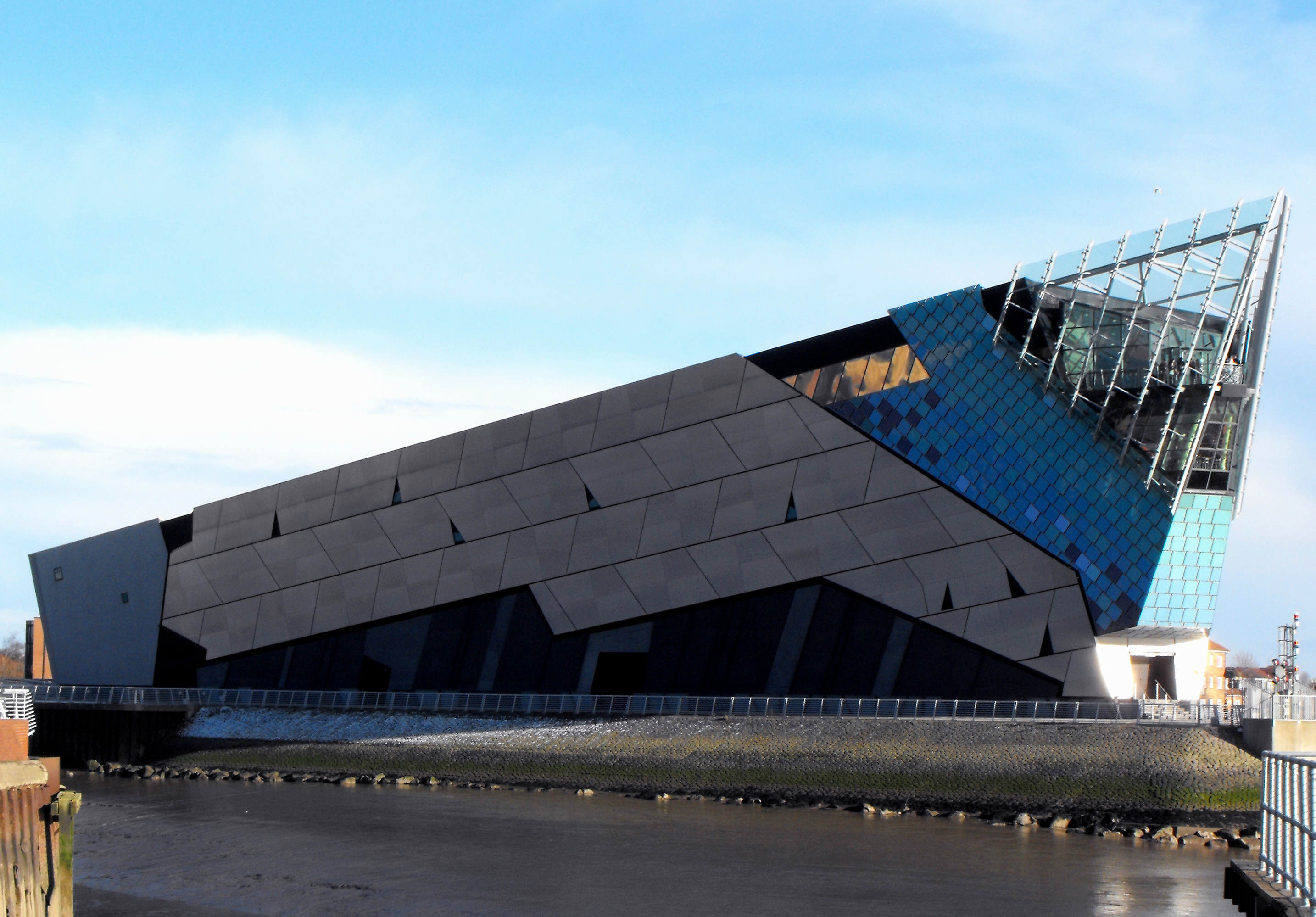
The Deep. Hull

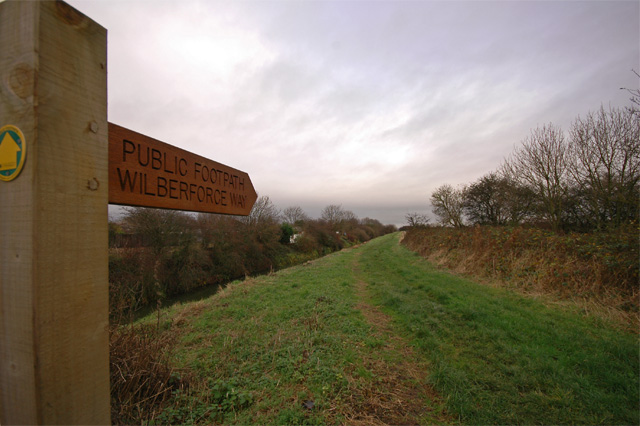
Wilberforce Way, Thearne

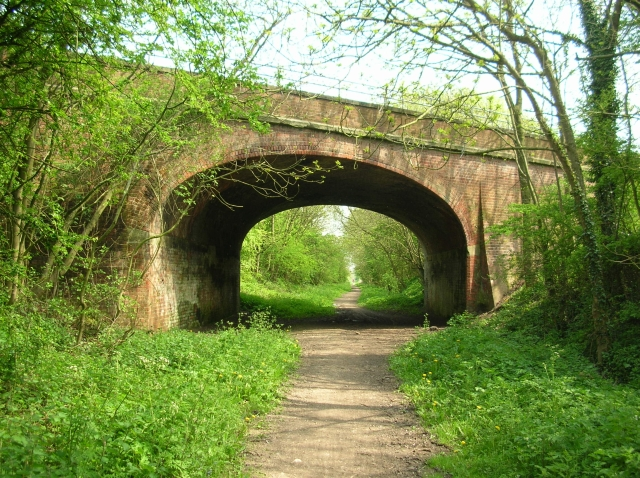
Under the A164 near Beverley

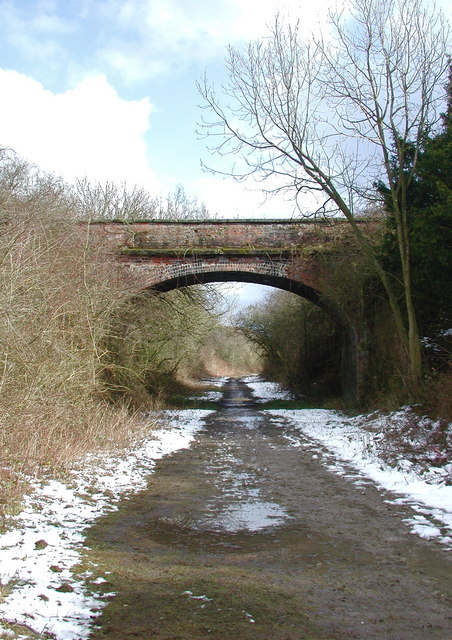
Chalk Bridge, Etton Wold

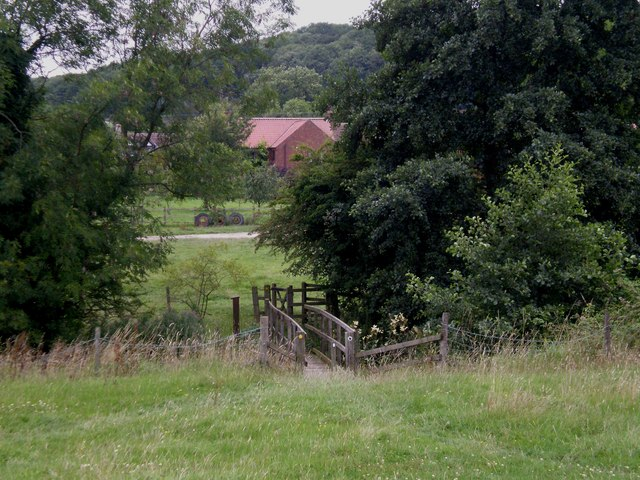
Footbridge over Nunburnholme Beck

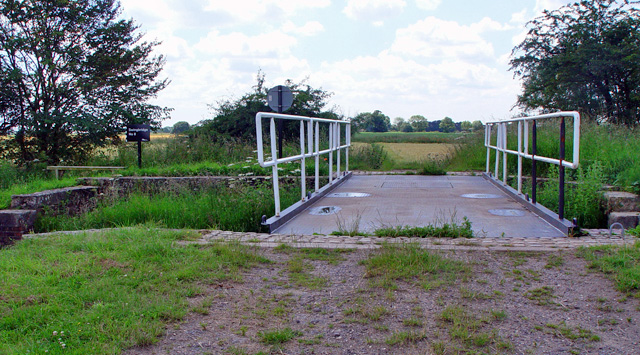
Swingbridge No 8, Pocklington Canal

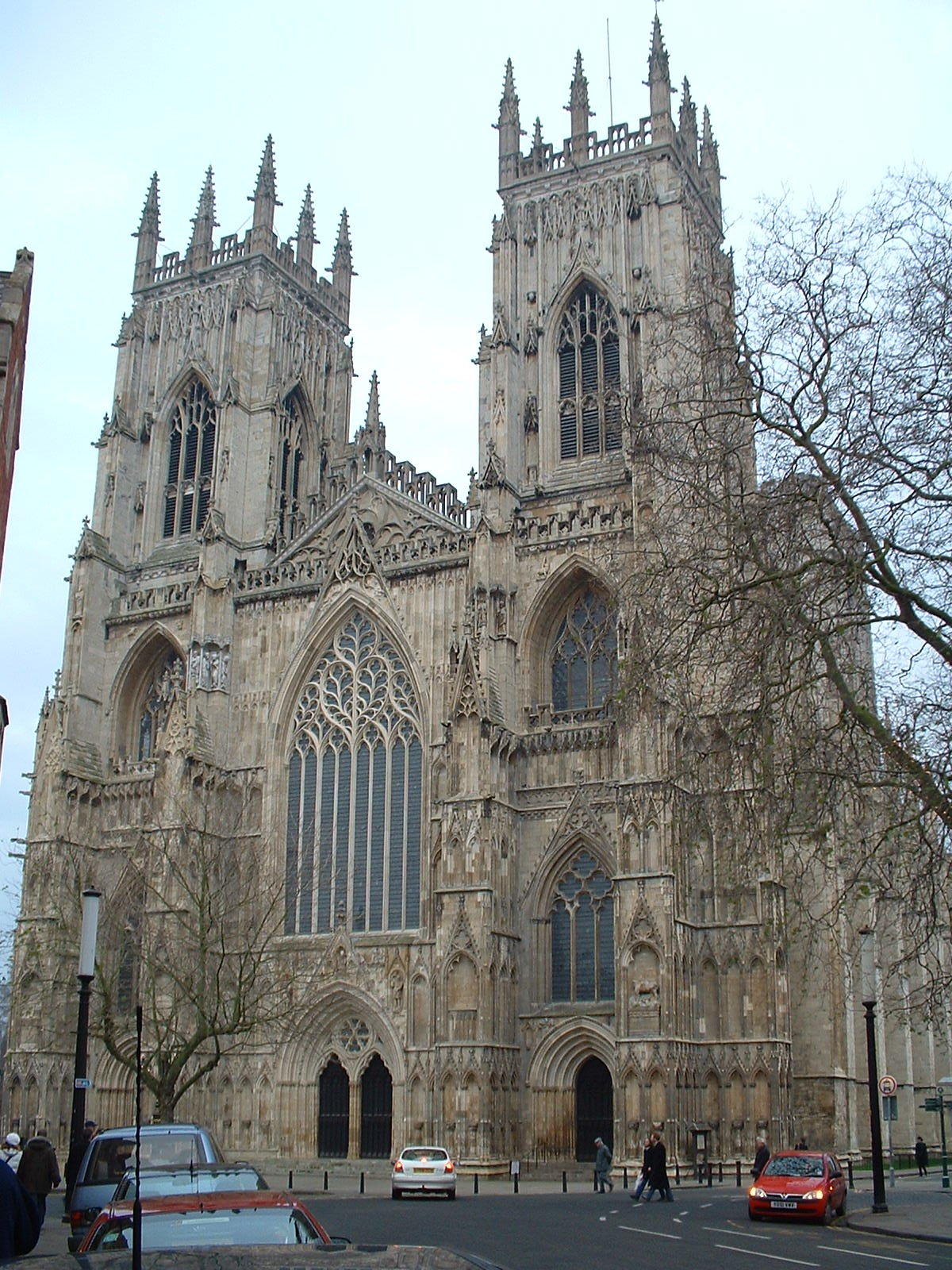
York Minster West Entrance

== Sources ==
- OS Landranger 105, 106, 107
- OS Landranger Active 105, 106, 107
- OS Explorer 290, 291, 293, 294
- OS Explorer Active 290, 291, 293, 294
