= World Methodist Peace Award =

Award from religious organisation

The World Methodist Peace Award is a peace award established by Dr. Stanley Leyland at the 13th World Methodist Conference in Dublin, Ireland held in 1976. It is awarded by the World Methodist Council for significant contributions to peace, reconciliation, and justice on the basis of courage, creativity, and consistency.

== Recipients ==
=== 1970s ===
- 1977: Saidie Patterson, Northern Ireland
- 1978: Anwar Sadat, Egypt

=== 1980s ===
- 1980: Abel Hendricks, South Africa
- 1981: Donald Soper, Baron Soper, Great Britain
- 1982: Kenneth Mew, Zimbabwe
- 1984: Tai-Young Lee, Korea
- 1985: Jimmy Carter, USA
- 1986: Sir Alan Walker and Lady Winifred Walker, Australia
- 1987: Bert Bissell, UK
- 1987: Woodrow Bradley Seals, USA
- 1988: Gordon Wilson, Northern Ireland

=== 1990s ===
- 1990: Mikhail Gorbachev, USSR
- 1991: Bärbel Bohley, Germany
- 1992: Zdravko Beslov, Bulgaria
- 1994: Bishop Elias Chacour, Palestine
- 1996: Stanley Mogoba, South Africa
- 1997: Community of Sant'Egidio, Italy
- 1998: Kofi Annan, Ghana
- 1999: Grandmothers of the Plaza de Mayo, Argentina

=== 2000s ===
- 2000: Nelson Mandela, South Africa
- 2001: Evangelist Joseph Rice Hale, USA
- 2002: Boris Trajkovski, Macedonia
- 2003: Casimira Rodríguez, Bolivia
- 2004: Millard Fuller and Habitat for Humanity, USA
- 2005: Bishop Lawi Imathiu, Kenya
- 2006: Sunday Mbang, Nigeria
- 2007: Harold Good, Northern Ireland
- 2008: Helen Prejean, USA
- 2009: Jeannine Brabon, Colombia

=== 2010s ===
- 2011: Rosalind Colwill, for work in Nigeria
- 2012: Joy Balazo, Philippines
- 2013: Marion and Anita Way, for work in Angola and Brazil
- 2014: Dr. Hugh and Shirliann Johnson, for work in Algeria
- 2015: Jo Anne Lyon, USA
- 2017: Nassar Family and Tent of Nations, Israel/Palestine
- 2017: Methodist Churches in Italy (OPCEMI)
- 2018: Inderjit Bhogal, UK
- 2019: James T. Laney, USA

=== 2020s ===
- 2020: John K. Yambasu, Sierra Leone
- 2021: Rev. Olav Pärnamets, Estonia
- 2022: Rev. Ebenezer Joseph, Sri Lanka
- 2023: Bishop Christian Alsted, Denmark
- 2024: Deaconess Norma Dollaga, Philippines
- 2025 : Fatou Bensouda, Gambia
