= Inderjit Bhogal =

Christian minister

Inderjit Bhogal OBE

President of the Methodist Conference
- In office 2000–2001
- Vice President: Sister Eluned Williams MBE
- Preceded by: Stuart John Burgess
- Succeeded by: Christina Le Moignan

Personal details
- Born: 1953 (age 72–73) Nairobi, Kenya
- Occupation: Methodist minister and theologian

Inderjit Bhogal OBE is a minister in the Methodist church and a leading theologian. He was the first person from a minority ethnic background to be appointed President of the Methodist Conference, in 2000 - 2001, and a founder of City of Sanctuary (UK).

== Personal life and education ==
Bhogal was born into a Sikh family in Kenya. In 1964, when he was eleven, the family had to leave the country as refugees and finally settled in Dudley in the UK. He started to attend a church because there was no local Sikh temple and then became a member of the Methodist church. He attended the Blue Coat School, Dudley, took a first degree in Manchester and then took master's degree at Oxford and Sheffield.

== Ministry ==
Once ordained, Inderjit was appointed to a circuit in Wolverhampton from 1979 until 1987, and then moved to Sheffield. He was appointed as President of the Methodist Conference for 2000 - 2001. He retired in 2018.

Inderjit had started an interfaith group by the time he was 20 and has continued to promote interfaith peacemaking and good relationships. He also advocates for justice for all people without prejudice, both within the Methodist church and more widely in secular society. His activism and outspoken challenges are considered by some within the church to have negatively affected his career within the clergy.

Since 1997 he has been active in campaigning about the treatment of asylum seekers and refugees. He is keen on walking in company and has used long-distance walks to gain publicity. In 2001 wrote a report Unlocking The Doors that he sent to the Home Secretary. He was one of the founders of City of Sanctuary (UK) that started in Sheffield in 2005. and in the same year he was appointed to the Order of the British Empire for his work on inter-faith relations. He was behind the designation of the Wilberforce Way in 2007. From 2011 - 2013 he was the chief executive officer of the Corrymeela Community in Northern Ireland, and at the time was the only person from a minority ethnic background in the island of Ireland to hold a CEO position. In 2018 Bhogal was awarded the World Methodist Peace Award as someone who has made significant contributions to peace, reconciliation and justice He said:

We must challenge our governments to divert money and investment from war to the ending of poverty and tackling climate change and pollution. In our personal lives we need to find ways to live with greater grace and generosity with those who are different from us.

In 2020 he became honorary president of the Fellowship of Reconciliation England and Scotland from 2020 until 2023.

Bhogal has been awarded honorary doctorates by the Universities of Oxford Brookes in 2001, Sheffield Hallam in 2002 and Sheffield in 2020.
