= Saidie Patterson =

Workers rights and peace activist

Saidie Patterson MBE
- Born: Sarah McKinley Moore; 25 November 1906; Belfast, Ireland
- Died: 16 January 1985 (aged 78); Belfast, Northern Ireland
- Education: Woodvale National School
- Known for: Peace activism

Saidie Patterson MBE (25 November 1906 – 16 January 1985) was a feminist, trade unionist and peace activist in Northern Ireland.

== Early life ==
Saidie Patterson was born Sarah McKinley Moore on 25 November 1906 in Belfast. Her parents were Sarah and William Patterson. Her father was a blacksmith for Harland and Wolff. Saidie's father died when she was six years of age. Her family were Methodists. She was the eldest of three children. Saidie's mother remarried and her new husband had five children. Saidie received a general education at Woodvale National School but was frequently absent as she was needed at home to assist with childcare. Saidie's mother died in childbirth in 1918, leaving Saidie to shoulder the burden of looking after her siblings, as her step-father was suffering from a debilitating mental illness.

== Biography ==
Patterson began working aged 14 for Ewart's Mills, Crumlin Road in north Belfast. The hardship endured by her family inspired her to challenge bosses for more favourable terms and conditions. At Ewart's she became involved in representing fellow workers in disputes with the management. Patterson became involved in workers rights and union activism. She pushed for women's membership of trade unions which were previously only open to men. Despite many local men opposing female union activism, Patterson garnered the support of two powerful union members: an Englishman, Ernest Bevin and Belfast's Bob Getgood Patterson pushed for a female membership of one-hundred per cent of the workforce, and for support from male members.

In February 1940 Patterson led 2,000 women on a strike that lasted seven weeks. As a result of the strike, they achieved better working conditions, and a thirty-three per cent pay rise, in addition to paid holidays. Patterson began working full time as head of the textile branch of the Transport and General Workers' Union, where she had a special responsibility for women, a position she was to hold for twenty years. She developed a close working relationship with Bob Getgood and made new connections such as with William Walker. Her increased influence led to meetings with Winston Churchill and Clement Attlee.

Patterson became a member of the Standing Conference of Women's Organisations where she worked tirelessly for the improved welfare of the female workforce. Clement Attlee and the Labour Party swept to power with a huge majority in the 1945 General Election, and when Northern Ireland's Prime Minister called an election Patterson campaigned hard for the Northern Ireland Labour Party where she saw four candidates returned to Stormont, including her comrade Bob Getgood in the Oldpark constituency.

During the 1950s Patterson was profoundly affected by Frank Buchman's Moral Re-Armament crusade. Buchman was a follower of John Wesley, and believed that societal reform came through personal reform. Patterson visited Buchman at his home in Caux, Switzerland.

Patterson's commitment to the labour movement was rewarded in 1950 by her appointment as treasurer to the NILP, and in 1956 she was appointed as Chairperson. Her campaigning contributed to the resurgence of the NILP in Ulster throughout the 1950s. Despite her best efforts to promote the non-sectarian party, NILP's influence decreased steadily throughout the 1960s. Patterson retired from the Transport and General Workers' Union in 1960 when she was to concentrate on Moral Re-armament.

Early in the 1970s Patterson joined Women Together, a peace group who supported working-class women who were facing financial hardship and sectarian strife. By the spring of 1972 Patterson had become the chairperson of Women Together. On 28 August 1976 Patterson joined with the Peace People, led by Mairead Corrigan and Betty Williams, to lead a march of 50,000 women on the Shankill Road and Woodvale Park to protest for peace. A short time thereafter Patterson was injured when a similar march was attacked on the Falls Road. Patterson spent several weeks in hospital with a spinal injury. She delivered an oration on peace at St Patrick's Cathedral, Dublin on the occasion of the papal visit to Ireland in 1979.

She was also an active member of the Girls Club Union for fifty years, where she organised classes and short breaks for underprivileged women and children.

In 1953, Patterson was awarded an MBE. The Arts Council of Northern Ireland commissioned a portrait of Patterson by TP Flanagan in 1975. The Women's International League for Peace named her one of the 50 most distinguished women of 1975. In 1977 Patterson became the first recipient of the World Methodist Peace Award. Patterson was at the reception for this award in Geneva when she received the news that her nephew had been murdered by the PIRA. In the same year she received the Joseph Parker Peace Prize. In total, Patterson received five international peace awards. Patterson also gained an honorary Master's degree from the Open University in 1977. Patterson counted Mother Teresa amongst her many friends.

== Death and legacy ==
Patterson died in the Royal Victoria Hospital in Belfast on 16 January 1985 aged 78. Patterson was unmarried and had no children. Patterson's commitment to women's rights and to peace, directly contributed to the reduction of child poverty and improved living conditions in Northern Ireland and better terms and conditions for working women.

David Bleakley wrote her biography in 1980 entitled Saidie Patterson, Irish peacemaker. Bleakley gave an oration at Patterson's funeral when he said, "An Ireland full of Saidies would be an island at peace". Patterson is commemorated with a blue plaque on the Shankill Road Methodist Church in Belfast, unveiled by the Ulster History Circle on International Women's Day 2018.
