= National Asylum Support Service =

British immigration division

The National Asylum Support Service (NASS) is a section of the UK Visas and Immigration (UKVI) division of the Home Office. It is responsible for supporting and accommodating people seeking asylum while their cases are being dealt with.

NASS was created in April 2000 under the Immigration and Nationality Act. Previously, local authorities and the Department for Work and Pensions (DWP) were responsible for the support and accommodation of asylum seekers. NASS presently has about 900 employees, about half at the NASS central office in Croydon and the others in 11 regional offices.

NASS describes its role as part of the "6th aim" of the Home Office:

"To regulate entry to, and settlement in, the United Kingdom effectively in the interests of sustainable growth and social inclusion. To provide an efficient and effective work permit system to meet economic and skills requirements, and fair, fast and effective programmes for dealing with visitors, citizenship and long term immigration applicants and those seeking refugee or asylum. To facilitate travel by UK citizens."

NASS provides certain types of support to people seeking asylum during the time that their applications are under way, while not itself judging the asylum applications, which is a responsibility of other parts of UKVI. The support can be support for accommodation, subsistence costs or both.

The Asylum Support Partnership is independent of NASS and its successors but assists and supports asylum seekers in its communications with them.

== Organisation ==
NASS has a Director (presently Jeremy Oppenheim) and divides its work into several different areas (present leader in parentheses):

- Accommodation 2005 Programme and Unaccompanied Asylum Seeking Children Reform Projects (Brian Kinney)
- Commercial (Eric Davies)
- Operations (Hugh Ind)
- Resources and Planning (Paul Darling)
- Central Information and advice Unit (Susan Hadland).
