= Christina Le Moignan =

British Methodist minister and academic

President of the Methodist Conference
- In office 2001–2002
- Vice President: Ann Leck MBE
- Preceded by: Inderjit Bhogal
- Succeeded by: Ian White

Personal details
- Born: 12 October 1942 (age 83)
- Education: Somerville College, Oxford
- Occupation: Methodist minister and academic

Christina Le Moignan (born 12 October 1942) is a British Methodist minister and academic, who served as President of the Methodist Conference from 2001 to 2002.

Le Moignan was born in Harrogate, the daughter of the Revd. Edward F. Le Moignan (1912-1999). Her education began at Edgehill College in Bideford. She then studied Classics at Somerville College, Oxford (MA Oxon graduating in 1965 and completed the Oxford Diploma in Public and Social Administration. From 1965 to 1970 she completed her PhD in Political Science at the University of Ibadan in Nigeria, as a Commonwealth Scholar. She also served on the academic staff.

On her return to England, she worked for a mental health charity, before studying theology at Wesley House, Cambridge Wesley House, Cambridge (1973-6).

Ordained in 1976, she ministered in Huntingdon, Southampton, and Portchester. She was then a tutor at Queen's College, Birmingham from 1989 to 1994, and was Principal of the West Midlands Ministerial Training Course from 1994 to 1996. She served as Chair of the Birmingham Methodist District from 1996 to 2004, and was President of the Methodist Conference for a year from June 2001, the second woman ever to hold this position.

In 2000 she published "Following the Lamb", A Reading of Revelation for the New Millennium.

Le Moignan was awarded an honorary Doctorate of Divinity by the University of Birmingham in 2002. She was a director of Birmingham Student Homes from 2002 to 2004. She became a supernumerary staff member at the University of Birmingham in 2004.
