= Equally Ours =

Formerly the Equality and Diversity Forum, Equally Ours is a network of UK organisations committed to equal opportunities, social justice, good community relations, respect for human rights and an end to discrimination based on age, disability, gender and gender identity, race, religion or belief, and sexual orientation.

Members and observers include some UK-wide organisations, some that operate across Great Britain and some that operate in England only. Although legislation on equality and human rights is reserved, many areas of policy and legislation that have a significant effect on inequality, such as education and health, are devolved. Wherever possible, Equally Ours works and shares information with similar networks of equality and human rights NGOs in Scotland, Wales and Northern Ireland.

== History ==
The Forum was established by Sarah Spencer and Patrick Grattan in 2002 to promote dialogue and understanding across the separate equality ‘strands’, and to ensure that policy debate on proposals for discrimination legislation and a single equality body recognises the cross-cutting nature of equality issues.

In 2019 the Equality and Diversity Forum rebranded as Equally Ours. This was to unify its policy forum, research network and strategic communications programme under a single brand-name, and to create a public-facing brand for its long-term strategy stated as dealing with hate crime, "winning hearts and minds on human rights" and promoting equality and human rights after Brexit.

== Structure ==
Equally Ours’ work benefits:

- Members of the Forum – mainly charities working in different areas of equality and human rights
- Observers of the Forum – organisations representing a wide range of interests who contribute to a better understanding of equality, diversity and human rights
- The wider public, including individuals experiencing discrimination directly and employees of organisations providing services and support to vulnerable and marginalised members of society

== Objectives ==
- To promote equality and in particular the elimination of discrimination on the grounds of age, disability, gender, gender identity, race, religion or belief, sexual orientation or any combination thereof;
- To promote Human Rights;
- To promote for the public benefit the efficiency and effectiveness of Voluntary Sector Providers working in the areas of age, disability, gender, gender identity, race, religion or belief, sexual orientation and Human Rights or any combination thereof;
- The advancement of conflict resolution or reconciliation between competing strands of equality and diversity.
