= John Waite (judge) =

The Right Honourable Sir John Waite

Lord Justice of Appeal

Personal details
- Born: John Douglas Waite; 3 July 1932 (age 94) Amersham, Buckinghamshire
- Spouse(s): Julia Tangye, Lady Waite
- Education: Corpus Christi College, Cambridge
- Occupation: Judge
- Profession: Barrister

Sir John Douglas Waite (born 3 July 1932) is an English barrister and former Lord Justice of Appeal. Sir John was also the former Chair of the Independent Asylum Commission.

== Education and career ==
Sir John Waite studied at the Sherborne School and Corpus Christi College, Cambridge, and was President of the Cambridge Union in 1955. After National Service in the Royal Artillery, he was called to the bar (Gray's Inn) in 1956. He took silk in 1975.

He was appointed to the High Court of Justice in 1982, receiving the customary knighthood. He sat in the Family Division of the High Court until 1993, when he was promoted to the Court of Appeal, and was sworn of the Privy Council. He retired in 1997.

Sir John Waite was also the chair of the children's charity UNICEF UK for seven years. In 2008, he spoke about the origins and work of the Independent Asylum Commission and the implications of its review and recommendations.
