= Alison Phipps (refugee researcher) =

UNESCO chair in Refugee Integration through Languages and the Arts

Alison Phipps OBE, FRSE, FRSA, FAcSS
- Education: PhD in German and Cultural Studies University of Sheffield
- Occupations: First UNESCO Chair in Refugee Integration through Languages and the Arts
- Employer: The University of Glasgow
- Known for: research into global refugees, asylum and migration, and using inter-cultural language and arts, influencing government policy and helping individual migrants

Alison Phipps OBE FRSE FRSA FAcSS a University of Glasgow professor of Languages and Intercultural Studies and holds the first UNESCO Chair in Refugee Integration through Languages and the Arts. She has been awarded the Minerva Medal of the Royal Philosophical Society and is a Fellow of the Royal Society of Arts, and Fellow of the Academy of Social Sciences.

She is co-director of the £25 million Global Challenge Research Fund programme with Heaven Crawley, Coventry University, and two professors in Ghana and Haiti, looking at arts and language in the global South, because, in her words, that is where 85% of migration occurs.

Alison Phipps is a member of the Iona Community.

== Career ==
Phipps' specialisms are wide-ranging and inter-disciplinary, covering refugees, asylum and migration, educating in the social sciences, multilingualism and tourism and communications for peace, while maintaining a broader interests in language learning and teaching, faith studies and ethnography. She works internationally and within the UK advising on policy and strategy.. She has also published two poetry collections. She admits to being critical of the UK government's policy on migration (2021).

Phipps chaired the New Scots Core Group for Refugee Integration with the Scottish Government, COSLA and the Scottish Refugee Council, for whom she acts as an Ambassador. Phipps serves on the Arts and Humanities Research Council (AHRC) Global Challenge Research Fund Advisory Board. She was appointed an Officer of the Order of the British Empire (OBE) in the 2012 Birthday Honours, "for services to education, inter-cultural and inter-religious relations" and elected as Fellow of the Royal Society of Edinburgh (2015). Phipps has worked (2008 - 2011) for the International Council of Churches International Ecumenical Peace Convocation, and chaired (1999 -2004) the International Association for Languages and Intercultural Communication (IALIC). She has participated and led a number of advisory bodies such as Red Cross, or Church of Scotland, to the Centre for Human Rights and Democracy in Ethiopia and the Higher Education Committee for developing Refugee Guidance for Universities Scotland. In 2015, she led a 5-day fact-finding group of UK Parliament Home Affairs and Justice Select Committee to refugee camps in Dunkirk and Calais, France.

=== Education and early career ===
Phipps spent her childhood and youth in Norton, Sheffield. She has remarked that her high school had a number of suicides, and she found solace in the Church and studying languages. Her grandparents had taken in refugees from Eastern Europe, and she has fostered a girl from Eritirea.

Her doctorate was in German and Cultural Studies, an ethnographic study of Naturtheater in a region of south-west Germany, completed in 1995.

Having been a lecturer at the University of Glasgow since 1995, originally in the Department of German Studies, she subsequently moved to take up a Chair in the university's School of Education.

=== Subsequent career and professional honours ===
She was a senior policy advisor to the British Council (2007 - 2014) and, in 2011, was voted 'Best College Teacher' by the students at Glasgow University and won the Universities 'Teaching Excellence Award'. She was the first Distinguished Visiting Professor at the University of Waikato (2013) and adjunct professor of Hospitality and Tourism at the University of Auckland, New Zealand (2017) and (2016) 'Thinker in Residence" at the EU Hawke Centre at the University of South Australia.

=== Recent research and leadership roles ===
As Principal Investigator in the £2 million AHRC international research project 'Researching Multilingually at Borders of the Body, Language, Law and the State,' Phipps involved speakers of 15 languages, global dramatists and key research teams during what was called 'the refugee crisis' during 2014 - 2017. Phipps was Executive Producer for a resultant televised drama for National Ghana TV with local indigenous and displaced people as actors in 2016, and repeating this work with the support professional mental health advisors in 2017, called Broken World, Broken Word. She produced and directed other media resulting from this research, and ran 'summer schools' in Ghana.

She has been convenor of the Glasgow Refugee Asylum and Migration Network (GRAMNET) which is a multi-agency international research and practice organisation working with policy makers and Third Sector and individuals covering the impacts causing migration (including climate change) and impacts and mitigations as a result.

Chairing the New Scots Core Group for Refugee Integration with the Scottish Government, COSLA and the Scottish Refugee Council involved Phipps in ensuring wide consultation on building strategy and practical advice. And her work with the International Council of Churches was through creative liturgy. She has used drama and inter-cultural methods including observation and engagement with diverse people in research programmes in the US, Europe, Australasia, the Caribbean and Africa.

In 2015, she was profiled in The Guardian explaining that she had lived with refugees as guests in her home, and volunteered at Dungavel detention centre and though these experiences did not solve the 'migration crisis', and is quoted as saying

'..hosting refugees in family homes is one answer to the lack of compassion and the desperate struggle for practical resources in the sector. The experience of sharing makes you far more acutely attuned to the needs of human beings and their suffering; it can develop empathy but most of all it changes us through relationships.'

In 2021, following the damage of the Scottish Crannog Centre, in a fire, Phipps and UNESCO Chair artist in residence Tawona Sithole wrote of the tears of the 'improvisors, working out how their forebears might have made shelters, might have lived' and the healing properties of working together to re-create their past, in weaving together Soay sheep wool - without language yet a 'thousand touches and a thousand voices'. Sitole travelled 8000.1 miles from Waterfalls, Harare, Zimbabwe to come there, but relates to a similarity of life in ancient Scotland with African ancestral lives which will 'create a deeper connection' globally and offer 'potent ways of healing'.

=== Public events and statements ===
Phipps took part in the RSE 'Curious' 2021 programme of public online events under the broad title of 'insights from some of the world's leading experts on health and well-being, innovation and invention, our planet and COVID-19', for which she co-hosted a discussion on changing the UK's asylum system; her image appeared in the National newspaper's 'Picture of the day' with the "Curious" logo . In the same paper in 2021, Phipps described the UK immigration reform as 'unjust' and likely to lead to deaths of would-be asylum seekers. She was quoted as saying that if passed the new laws would lead to 'future legal challenges', 'risked taking the UK out of the Refugee Convention' and 'undermine the work of the New Scots Integration Policy, which has a primary principle the integration of those seeking asylum from day one, and which is internationally acclaimed'.

She was one of the academics who resigned in March 2021 in protest from the UKRI Arts and Humanities Research Council international development panel at the cutting of Uk government research funding for 900 projects. Phipps was also highly critical of the UK's 'evil' immigration policy after 27 refugees died attempting to cross the English Channel in an unsuitable boat in November 2021.

== Publications ==
She has 128 academic publications and media outputs in 2021.

She is a frequent contributor to the Scottish newspaper "the National".

=== Poetry ===
Phipps published her first poetry collection Through Wood in 2009 and another, The Warriors Who Do Not Fight, a collaboration with Tawona Sithole, in 2018.

In November 2024, a collaborative collection of poetry, together with Khawla Badwan, "Keep telling of Gaza" was published.

=== Editorships ===
She co-edits Tourism and Cultural Change journal and books, Languages, Intercultural Communication and Education and is on the editorial board of Language and Intercultural Communication, Critical Multilingualism Studies, and Hospitality and Society.
