= Stephen Hale (charity executive) =

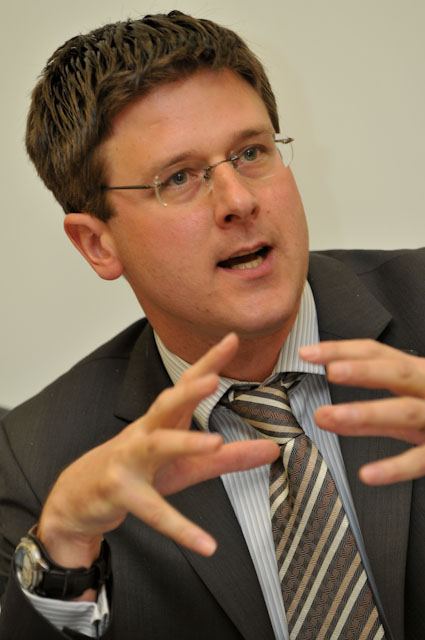
Stephen Hale

Stephen Hale OBE is the founding Chief Executive of Climate Catalyst, established in 2021 to spark collective action on climate change through mobilising private sector and civil society actors in Europe, India and Indonesia. Climate Catalyst programmes currently focus on accelerating action in industrial sectors including steel and aviation.

Stephen was Chief Executive of Refugee Action from 2015 - March 2021. He was named as charity chief executive of the year for 2019 in September 2019. Refugee Action was runner up in the 2020 Third Sector Charity of the Year category. During his time at Refugee Action he blogged regularly on how the UK could meet its responsibilities to support those fleeing war and persecution including for HuffPost.

Stephen was a trustee of Friends of the Earth from 2014 to 2018, and a trustee of the Samworth Foundation from 2015 to 2019.

From 2010 to February 2015 Stephen was Deputy and Advocacy Campaigns director of Oxfam International, and head of the Geneva office of Oxfam International.

From 2006 - April 2010 he was the director of Green Alliance, an independent charity and green think tank working on environment policy in the United Kingdom. He was a trustee of Christian Aid from 2007 - 2010.

He worked previously at the Department for Environment, Food and Rural Affairs, as special adviser to Secretary of State Margaret Beckett MP from 2003 to 2006, and before that, as adviser to environment minister Michael Meacher from 2002 to 2003. Formerly, he was a senior consultant at ERM, an international environmental consultancy. He was also active in SERA (the environmental socialist society affiliated to the Labour Party), serving as chair in 2001-02 and as vice-chair from 1999 to 2001.

He is the author of The new commandments of climate change strategy and The new politics of climate change (2008) and is currently the third sector chair of the ministerial task force on climate change, the environment and sustainable development.

He was appointed Officer of the Order of the British Empire (OBE) in the 2011 New Year Honours for services to the environment.
