= Refugee Action =

British charitable organization

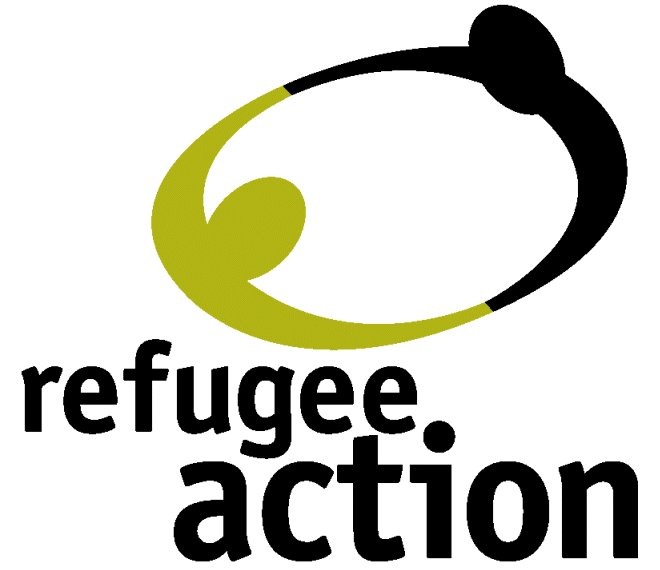
Refugee Action

Refugee Action is an independent national charity founded in 1981 that provides advice and support to refugees and asylum seekers in the UK and campaigns for a fairer asylum system. It is governed by a board of trustees chaired by Penny Lawrence. Its chief executive is Stephen Hale OBE, who joined the charity in February 2014.

Each year Refugee Action provides advice and practical support to over 10,000 vulnerable asylum seekers and refugees from dozens of countries, and offers a range of specialist services. Until the end of 2015 it ran the UK's assisted voluntary return (AVR) programme.

Refugee Action has a head office in London and offices in Manchester, Liverpool, Birmingham and Bristol.

== Refugee resettlement ==
The group's work has included the resettlement of refugees from Vietnam, Bosnia and Kosovo, as well as evacuees from Montserrat after the Soufrière Hills volcano eruption in 1995.

=== Gateway Resettlement Programme ===
Refugee Action operates the largest part of the UNHCR Gateway Resettlement Programme in the UK, which resettles 750 refugees every year. The main countries of origin of current service users include Somalia, Sudan, Iraq, Ethiopia and Congo.

=== Syrian Vulnerable Person Resettlement Scheme ===
The Syrian Vulnerable Person Resettlement Scheme is also delivered by Refugee Action in some areas of the UK. The scheme intends to resettle up to 20,000 Syrians in the UK.

== Support for asylum seekers ==
Refugee Action helps asylum seekers making claims for asylum and offers support throughout the asylum process. Prevention of asylum homelessness is part of that work.

== Campaigning ==
Current Refugee Action priorities include Let Refugees Learn, which calls for more ESOL provision for refugees, and highlighting problems in the asylum support system. Past campaigns include Right to Volunteer and Bring back Dignity.

== Co-operation ==
Refugee Action works in association with other refugee and human rights organisations, such as the Refugee Council and Amnesty International. It was among the groups that campaigned against section 55 of the Nationality, Immigration and Asylum Act 2002, later overturned in the courts, which denied financial and housing support to asylum seekers who failed to claim asylum within three days of arrival.

Refugee Action is a member of The Detention Forum, a network of organisations working together to challenge the UK's use of detention, and has published research on the adverse effects of detention on the mental and physical health of detained asylum seekers.

Refugee Action is also a member organisation of the European Council on Refugees and Exiles and the Asylum Support Partnership along with the Refugee Council, Scottish Refugee Council, Welsh Refugee Council, North of England Refugee Service and Northern Refugee Centre.
