= Refugee Council =

British humanitarian organization

- Founded: 1951; 75 years ago
- Founder: Anne Curwen
- Type: Non-profit NGO
- Headquarters: Stratford, London
- Members: 70 member organisations
- Key people: Rachael Orr (Chair); Katie Ghose (Chief Executive)
- Website: www.refugeecouncil.org.uk
- Formerly called: British Council for Aid to Refugees (BCAR)

The Refugee Council is a UK-based organisation which works with refugees and asylum seekers. The organisation provides support and advice to refugees and asylum seekers, as well as support for other refugee and asylum seeker organisations. The Refugee Council also produces many reports and educational material relating to refugee issues, and lobbies politicians and the media on these issues. The Council works in partnership with many other refugee organisations, including the British Red Cross, Scottish Refugee Council, Welsh Refugee Council, North of England Refugee Service, Northern Refugee Centre, and Refugee Action.

== History ==
The Refugee Council originated from two independent organisations, British Council for Aid to Refugees (BCAR) and the Standing Conference on Refugees (SCOR), which were both founded in 1951 following the United Nations Convention Relating to the Status of Refugees. In 1981 these two organisations merged to form the British Refugee Council which was later renamed the Refugee Council due to the establishment of various other regional refugee councils. The Refugee Council Archives are held at University of East London, Docklands Campus.

== Work ==
The Refugee Council's head office is in Stratford London. The organisation's main activities are providing support and advice to asylum seekers and refugees themselves as well as to other organisations, undertaking research and policy work, and campaigning on behalf of refugees and asylum seekers. The Refugee Council is a member organisation of the Asylum Support Partnership and European Council on Refugees and Exiles (ECRE).

=== Support and advice ===
Refugee Council has received an exemption from the OISC to provide immigration advice and holds the Quality Mark for advice work. Regional offices throughout England provide services to asylum seekers and refugees including:

- Advice about where to apply for support, and help with applying;
- Information about the UK's 'dispersal policy';
- Information about other services which can assist;
- Help with problems with accommodation, racial harassment, physical and mental health; and
- Help with appealing against rejection of a UKBA support application.

These services are available either in the Refugee Council offices or on the phone.

Drop in services provide hot meals, food parcels, clothes and English classes, as well as advice and support.

In addition, the Refugee Council offers special advice to unaccompanied children, including children who are under 18 when they arrive in the UK and young people aged 18–21 who are caring for younger siblings. This specialist support includes

- Help to obtain legal representation, and guiding the child through the process;
- Accompanying the child to asylum interviews, hearings, tribunals etc.;
- Supporting the child during doctor's or social service appointments; and

In 2011 the charity launched a new Own Language Telephone Advice Service (OLTAS) providing free multilingual advice for asylum seekers and refugees.

=== Campaigning ===
In 2005, Refugee Council launched a campaign called Don't Believe the Type aimed at combating what they see as hostility and prejudice towards asylum seekers and refugees.

In 2008 Refugee Council formed the Still Human Still Here coalition with Amnesty International UK, Medical Foundation and over 40 other organisations, which is dedicated to highlighting the plight of tens of thousands of refused asylum seekers in UK and campaigning to end destitution of asylum seekers.

In 2011 the charity launched the Proud to Protect pledge which with the help of celebrity supporters gathered over 10,000 signatures.

In 2012 the charity launched the London♥Refugees campaign for the London Mayoral elections.

== Key people ==
=== Patrons ===
==== Current ====
- Emma Thompson
- Alf Dubs

==== Former ====
- Hari Kunzru
- Sir Bill Morris

=== Chief executives ===
- Martin Barber, 1982–1988
- Alf Dubs, 1988–1995
- Nick Hardwick, June 1995 – January 2003
- Margaret Lally, (acting) June 2003 – August 2003
- Maeve Sherlock, August 2003 – October 2006
- Anna Reisenberger (acting) October 2006 – May 2007
- Donna Covey, May 2007 – October 2012
- Shān Nicholas, (interim) October 2012 – March 2013
- Maurice Wren, March 2013 – November 2020
- Enver Solomon, December 2020 – 2026
- Belinda Phipps, (interim) 2026
- Katie Ghose, 2026 – present

== See also ==
- United Nations High Commissioner for Refugees
- European Council on Refugees and Exiles
- Refugee Week
