= Welsh Refugee Council =

Refugee aid organisation

- Founded: 11 February 1990
- Type: Refugee aid organisation
- Registration no.: 1102449
- Location: Cardiff, Wales, United Kingdom
- Coordinates: 51.492441°N 3.147165°W
- Region served: Wales
- Product: Advice services, social policy, campaigning, research, lobbying
- Website: wrc.wales

The Welsh Refugee Council is an independent charity to the Refugee Council and Scottish Refugee Council, and works to help asylum seekers and refugees in Wales, United Kingdom. It was founded in 1990 and established Wales' first asylum support services in Cardiff in 1992.

The Welsh Refugee Council received national attention in 2025, when Elon Musk shared a post on X (formerly Twitter) falsely attributing a video of schoolgirls to the charity and claiming the organisation was using children to convince refugees to come to Wales.

== History ==
The Welsh Refugee Council was founded on 11 February 1990, the day anti-apartheid activist Nelson Mandela was released from prison in South Africa. In 1992, the Home Office gave the council a £30,000 grant to set up the first asylum support services in Wales, based in Cardiff.

In January 2011, the UK Border Agency announced funding cuts for the Welsh Refugee Council, along with other refugee agencies across the country. It was estimated that the "One Stop Service", which provides advice to asylum seekers and refugees in Wales, would face cuts of 62%. In response to the planned cutbacks, the Welsh Refugee Council issued a joint statement with its counterparts in England and Scotland, which read in part: "Savage cuts to the refugee charity sector will force people who have already fled torture, conflict, and persecution in their own countries to suffer even further while seeking safety in the UK."

In January 2025, charity workers were subjected to online harassment and death threats after Elon Musk shared a post that made false claims about the Welsh Refugee Council on X (formerly Twitter). The post featured a video of schoolgirls "explaining why Wales was a welcoming country for refugees". However, the caption falsely claimed that it was an effort by the Welsh Refugee Council to "[use] 12-year-old girls ... to entice migrant men to come to Wales". Conservative member of the Senedd Andrew RT Davies subsequently denounced the Welsh Refugee Council and accused his Labour colleagues in the Welsh government of using children in their "propaganda". The Welsh Refugee Council referred Davies' comments to the Senedd's Standards Commissioner and the South Wales Police began an investigation into an allegation of malicious communications.
